= Timeline of Pistoia =

The following is a timeline of the history of the city of Pistoia in the Tuscany region of Italy.

== Prior to 17th century ==
- 62 BCE - Battle of Pistoria fought near town.
- 5th C. CE - Roman Catholic Diocese of Pistoia established.
- 595 CE - Cattedrale di San Zeno dedicated.
- 8th C. CE - Sant'Andrea church, likely date of origin.
- 772 CE - Walls of Pistoia built (approximate date).
- 12th C. - Church of Sant' Andrea expanded.
- 1108 - Pistoia Cathedral damaged by fire.
- 1117 - Pistoia "defeated by Lucca."
- 1150 - City walls expanded (approximate date).
- 1240 - City walls rebuilt (approximate date).
- 1294 - San Domenico church construction begins.
- 1302-1306 - Pistoia besieged by Florentine and Luccan forces.
- 1325 - Luccan Castruccio Castracani in power.
- 1348 - Black Death plague.
- 1351 - Surrendered to Florence.
- 1353 - Palazzo degli Anziani (Pistoia) expanded (approximate date).
- 1359 - Battistero di San Giovanni in corte (baptistery) built.
- 1368 - Palazzo Pretorio (Pistoia) built.
- 1401 - Pistoia becomes part of the Florentine Republic.
- 1494 - Basilica of Our Lady of Humility construction begins.
- 1495 - Madonna dell'Umiltà construction begins.

== 17th-19th centuries ==
- 1615 - Palazzo Ganucci Cancellieri refurbished.
- 1630 - Plague outbreak.
- 1642 - Accademia dei Risvegliati founded.
- 1643 - Pistoia besieged by papal forces.
- 1650 - Palazzo Marchetti sold.
- 1694 - Teatro Manzoni (Pistoia) (theatre) built.
- 1696 - Biblioteca Forteguerriana (library) founded.
- 1726 - Biblioteca Fabroniana (library) founded.
- 1786
  - Religious Synod of Pistoia held.
  - Palazzo Bracciolini commissioned.
- 1795 - Palazzo Rossi construction completed.
- 1849 - Pistoia occupied by Austrians.
- 1851 - Pistoia railway station opens.
- 1860 - Circondario di Pistoia (administrative region) established.
- 1861 - Pistoia becomes part of the Kingdom of Italy.
- 1864 - Porrettana railway begins operating.
- 1881 - Population: 54,920.

== 20th century ==
- 1906 - Population: 68,131.
- 1921 - U.S. Pistoiese 1921 (football club) formed.
- 1927 - Administrative Province of Pistoia created.
- 1931 - Population: 70,397.
- 1943 - October: Bombing of Pistoia in World War II.
- 1966
  - "Superachitettura" exhibit held.
  - Stadio Comunale (stadium) opens.
- 1969 - Copit (transit entity) established.
- 1970 - Zoo di Pistoia established.
- 1971
  - Breda Costruzioni Ferroviarie in business.
  - Population: 93,185.
- 1974 - Istituto Storico della Resistenza (historical institute) established.
- 1980 - Pistoia Blues Festival begins.
- 1992 - Local election held; Lido Scarpetti becomes mayor.

== 21st century ==
- 2001 - AnsaldoBreda engineering firm in business.
- 2002 - Local election held; Renzo Berti becomes mayor.
- 2003 - Associazione Storia e Città (history society) formed.
- 2005 - Blubus (transit entity) established.
- 2007 - Biblioteca San Giorgio (library) opens.
- 2009 - Il Funaro (cultural entity) established.
- 2012 - Local election held; Samuele Bertinelli becomes mayor.
- 2013 - Population: 88,904.
- 2015 - 31 May: 2015 Tuscan regional election held.
- 2017 - Local election held; Alessandro Tomasi becomes mayor.

== See also ==
- History of Pistoia
- List of mayors of Pistoia
- List of bishops of Pistoia
- History of Tuscany

Other cities in the macroregion of Central Italy:^{(it)}

- Timeline of Ancona, Marche region
- Timeline of Arezzo, Tuscany region
- Timeline of Florence, Tuscany
- Timeline of Grosseto, Tuscany
- Timeline of Livorno, Tuscany
- Timeline of Lucca, Tuscany
- Timeline of Perugia, Umbria region
- Timeline of Pisa, Tuscany
- Timeline of Prato, Tuscany
- Timeline of Rome, Lazio region
- Timeline of Siena, Tuscany

== Bibliography ==
=== in English ===
- Edward Herbert Bunbury (1872) [1854]. "Pistoia". In William Smith (ed.). Dictionary of Greek and Roman Geography. London: John Murray. hdl:2027/hvd.ah5cur.
- "Pistoia". Chambers's Encyclopaedia. London. 1901. hdl:2027/njp.32101065312934.
- "Pistoia" . Encyclopædia Britannica. Vol. 21 (11th ed.). 1910. p. 653.
- "Pistoia", Northern Italy (14th ed.), Leipzig: Karl Baedeker, 1913
- David Herlihy (1967). Medieval and Renaissance Pistoia: the Social History of an Italian Town, 1200-1430. Yale University Press. OCLC 409178.
- Stephen J. Milner (2000). "Statutory division and supra-communal clientage in Pistoia". In William J. Connell; Andrea Zorzi (eds.). Florentine Tuscany: Structures and Practices of Power. Cambridge University Press. pp. 312+. ISBN 0521591112.
- Roy Domenico (2002). "Tuscany: Pistoia". Regions of Italy: a Reference Guide to History and Culture. Greenwood. pp. 337+. ISBN 0313307334.
- Christopher Kleinhenz, ed. (2004). "Pistoia". Medieval Italy: an Encyclopedia. Routledge. pp. 915+. ISBN 0415939291.
- Sarah Tiboni (2013). "Pistoia: a case study". In Frances Andrews (ed.). Churchmen and Urban Government in Late Medieval Italy, c.1200–c.1450. Cambridge University Press. ISBN 9781107044265.

=== in Italian ===
- M. Salvi. Historia di Pistoia. 1656-1662
- I. Fioravanti. Memorie storiche d. città di Pistoia, Lucca 1758
- G. Tigri. Pistoia ed il suo territorio, 1853
- Vittorio Capponi (1874). Bibliografia pistoiese. Pistoia: Rossetti. (Bibliography)
- "Pistoja". Nuova Enciclopedia Italiana (in Italian). Vol. 17 (6th ed.). Turin: Unione Tipografico-Editrice Torinese. 1884. hdl:2027/nnc1.cu08476845.
- Carlo Lozzi (1887). "Storie de'Municipii: Pistoia". Biblioteca istorica della antica e nuova Italia (in Italian). Vol. 2. Imola. OCLC 12117233. (Bibliography)
- Mascarucci, Pietro Osvaldo; Chiti, Alfredo; Santoli, Quinto; Chiappelli, Luigi; Volpi, Gugulielmo (1899), Bullettino storico pistoiese (in Italian), ISSN 0007-5809 1899-
- O. Giglioli. Pistoia nelle sue opere d'arte, Firenze 1904
- A. Chiappelli. Storia del teatro in Pistoia dalle origini alla fine del sec. XVIII, 1913
- "Pistoia", Enciclopedia Italiana (Treccani) (in Italian), 1935
