= Timeline of Lucca =

City of Lucca, Italy

The following is a timeline of the history of the city of Lucca in the Tuscany region of Italy.

== Prior to 18th century ==
- 3rd C. BCE - Ligurian settlement.
- 180 BCE - Latin colony established.
- 89 BCE - Lucca becomes a municipium.
- 56 BCE - Conference of political leaders Caesar, Pompey, and Crassus held in Lucca.
- 343 CE - Roman Catholic diocese of Lucca active (approximate date).
- 553 CE - Lucca besieged by forces of Narses during the Gothic War.
- 571 - Lucca becomes an episcopal seat of the Lombards.
- 713 - Walperto becomes Lombard duke of Lucca.
- 1004 - Pisa-Lucca conflict.
- 1052 - Matilda of Tuscany in power.
- 1057 - Anselmo da Baggio becomes bishop.
- 1063 - Lucca Cathedral construction begins.
- 1119 - Office of consul active.
- 1147 - Basilica of San Frediano built.
- 1197 - Lucca joins the Tuscan League.
- 1314 - Uguccione della Faggiuola in power.
- 1316 - Castruccio Castracani in power.
- 1328 - death of Castruccio Castracani and triumph of the Guelph party; rule by Louis IV, Holy Roman Emperor begins.
- 1329 - rule by John of Bohemia begins.
- 1333 - rule by Marsilio, Pietro, and Orlandi de' Rossi di Parma, royal vicars of John of Bohemia begins.
- 1335 - rule by Mastino and Alberto della Scala, Signori of Lucca begins.
- 1341 - rule by the commune of Florence begins.
- 1342 - rule by the commune of Pisa begins.
- 1364 - rule by Giovanni dell'Angnello de' Conti, Doge of Pisa begins.
- 1369 - Lucca resumes self rule under the Anziani of Lucca.
- 1429 - Siege of Lucca begins.
- 1477 - Printing press in operation.
- 1504 - Walls of Lucca construction begins.
- 1578 - Ducal Palace remodelled.
- 1584 - Accademia lucchese di scienze, lettere e arti founded?

== 18th-19th centuries ==
- 1726 - Roman Catholic Archdiocese of Lucca established by Pope Benedict XIII.
- 1790 - University of Lucca opens.
- 1794 - Biblioteca statale di Lucca (library) opens.
- 1805 - French client principality of Lucca and Piombino established.
- 1806 - Consiglio municipale (city council) convenes.
- 1815 - Duchy of Lucca established per Congress of Vienna.
- 1819
  - Teatro del Giglio (theatre) built.
  - Real Liceo (school) established.
- 1820 - Orto Botanico Comunale di Lucca (garden) established.
- 1832 - Aqueduct of Nottolini built in vicinity of Lucca.
- 1837 - Town Hall moves into the Palazzo Santini.
- 1846 - Lucca railway station opens; Pisa–Lucca railway begins operating.
- 1847 - Became one of the divisions of Tuscany.
- 1863 - Monument to Francesco Burlamacchi erected in the Piazza San Michele.
- 1883 - Lucca–Ponte a Moriano tramway begins operating.

== 20th century ==
- 1901 - Population: 73,465.
- 1905 - Lucca Football Club formed.
- 1911 - Population: 76,160.
- 1931 - Population: 81,807.
- 1935 - Stadio Porta Elisa (stadium) opens.
- 1972 - Mauro Favilla becomes mayor.
- 1979 - Archivio Storico Comunale (city archives) established.
- 1984 - Franco Antonio Fanucchi becomes mayor.
- 1998 - Pietro Fazzi becomes mayor.

== 21st century ==
- 2005 - Lucca Film Festival begins.
- 2012 - Alessandro Tambellini becomes mayor.
- 2013 - Population: 87,598.

== See also ==
- History of Lucca
- List of mayors of Lucca
- List of bishops of Lucca (in Italian)
- State Archives of Lucca (state archives)
- History of Tuscany

Other cities in the macroregion of Central Italy:^{(it)}

- Timeline of Ancona, Marche region
- Timeline of Arezzo, Tuscany region
- Timeline of Florence, Tuscany
- Timeline of Grosseto, Tuscany
- Timeline of Livorno, Tuscany
- Timeline of Perugia, Umbria region
- Timeline of Pisa, Tuscany
- Timeline of Prato, Tuscany
- Timeline of Rome, Lazio region
- Timeline of Siena, Tuscany

== Bibliography ==
=== in English ===
- William Smith, ed. (1872) [1854]. "Luca". Dictionary of Greek and Roman Geography. London: John Murray. hdl:2027/hvd.ah5cur.
- Bella Duffy (1892). The Tuscan Republics (Florence, Siena, Pisa, and Lucca) with Genoa. Story of the Nations. London: T. Fisher Unwin.
- Ismar Elbogen; Vittore Castiglione (1904), "Lucca", Jewish Encyclopedia, vol. 8, New York, hdl:2027/mdp.49015002282243
- Janet Ross; Nelly Erichsen (1912), Story of Lucca, Mediaeval Towns, London: J.M. Dent & Co.
- Ashby, Thomas (1910). "Lucca" . Encyclopædia Britannica. Vol. 17 (11th ed.). pp. 94–95.
- Benjamin Vincent (1910), "Lucca", Haydn's Dictionary of Dates (25th ed.), London: Ward, Lock & Co., hdl:2027/uc2.ark:/13960/t41r6xh8t
- "Lucca", Northern Italy (14th ed.), Leipzig: Karl Baedeker, 1913 (+ 1870 ed.)
- Christopher Kleinhenz, ed. (2004). "Lucca". Medieval Italy: an Encyclopedia. Routledge. pp. 658+. ISBN 0415939291.
- M. E. Bratchel (2008). Medieval Lucca and the Evolution of the Renaissance State. Oxford University Press. ISBN 978-0-19-954290-1.

=== in Italian ===
- Guida del forestiere per la città e il contado di Lucca. Dalla tip. di Francesco Baroni. 1820.
- "Lucca", Enciclopedia Italiana (in Italian), 1934
