= Andrea Tagliasacchi =

Italian politician (born 1959)

Mayor of Castelnuovo di Garfagnana
- Incumbent
- Assumed office 26 May 2014
- Preceded by: Gaddo Lucio Gaddi

President of the Province of Lucca
- In office 12 May 1997 – 30 May 2006
- Preceded by: Enrico Grabau
- Succeeded by: Stefano Baccelli

Personal details
- Born: 5 January 1959 (age 67) Castelnuovo di Garfagnana, Province of Lucca, Italy
- Party: Democratic Party (since 2007); Previously: PCI (until 1991); PDS (1991–1998); DS (1998–2007)
- Occupation: Public manager

Andrea Tagliasacchi (born 5 January 1959) is an Italian politician and public manager. He has served as mayor of Castelnuovo di Garfagnana since 2014 and previously served as president of the Province of Lucca from 1997 to 2006.

== Career ==
Tagliasacchi joined the Italian Communist Party at a young age and was elected to the municipal council of Castelnuovo di Garfagnana. In 1990 he was elected to the Provincial Council of Lucca, and was re-elected in 1994 as a member of the Democratic Party of the Left. He was elected president of the Province of Lucca in 1997 with the support of the Olive Tree coalition and re-elected in 2001, serving until 2006. He was also a member of the regional leadership of the Democrats of the Left.

In 2007, Tagliasacchi ran for mayor of Lucca for the Union coalition, but was defeated by Mauro Favilla, who was supported by the House of Freedoms. Tagliasacchi subsequently served as an opposition municipal councillor in Lucca.

In May 2014, he was elected mayor of Castelnuovo di Garfagnana. He was re-elected in 2019 and 2024. In August 2016, he announced his candidacy for mayor of Lucca, but withdrew after incumbent mayor Alessandro Tambellini announced that he would seek a second term.

In November 2023, Tagliasacchi was appointed president of the Apuan Alps Regional Park.
