= Piero Baccelli =

Italian politician

President of the Province of Lucca
- In office 18 February 1992 – 1 December 1992
- Preceded by: Franco Antonio Fanucchi
- Succeeded by: Pier Giorgio Licheri

Mayor of Lucca
- In office 31 July 1985 – 30 March 1988
- Preceded by: Franco Antonio Fanucchi
- Succeeded by: Mauro Favilla

Personal details
- Born: Piero Luigi Baccelli; 24 February 1928 Lucca, Kingdom of Italy
- Died: 17 November 2017 (aged 89) Lucca, Italy
- Party: Christian Democracy
- Occupation: Surveyor

Piero Luigi Baccelli (24 February 1928 – 17 November 2017) was an Italian politician of the Christian Democracy party who served as mayor of Lucca from 1985 to 1988 and as president of the Province of Lucca in 1992.

== Life and career ==
Born in Lucca, Baccelli worked as a surveyor. He was the son of Italico Baccelli, who had served as mayor of Lucca from 1960 to 1965.

Baccelli served as mayor of Lucca from 31 July 1985 until 30 March 1988. He resigned after a first-instance court ruling concerning contamination of a municipal water supply well, although he was later fully acquitted.

From February to December 1992, he served as president of the Province of Lucca. He was married to Piera Angelini, sister of politician Piero Angelini. Their son, Stefano Baccelli, later served as president of the Province of Lucca from 2006 to 2015.

He died in Lucca on 17 November 2017, aged 89.
