= Bracciolini =

Bracciolini is a surname of Italian origin. Notable people with the surname include:

- Francesco Bracciolini (1566–1645), Italian poet
- Poggio Bracciolini (1380–1459), Italian scholar and Renaissance humanist

== See also ==
- Palazzo Bracciolini, Pistoia, a palace in Tuscany, Italy
- Terranuova Bracciolini, a comune in Tuscany, Italy
