= Marcello Pierucci =

Italian politician (born 1964)

President of the Province of Lucca
- Incumbent
- Assumed office 30 September 2024
- Preceded by: Luca Menesini

Mayor of Camaiore
- Incumbent
- Assumed office 14 June 2022
- Preceded by: Alessandro Del Dotto

Personal details
- Born: 17 January 1964 (age 62) Camaiore, Province of Lucca, Italy
- Party: Democratic Party
- Occupation: Accountant

Marcello Pierucci (born 17 January 1964) is an Italian politician of the Democratic Party. He has served as mayor of Camaiore since 2022 and as president of the Province of Lucca since 2024.

== Life and career ==
Pierucci was born in Camaiore, Tuscany, in 1964. He graduated from the Carlo Piaggia Institute in Viareggio and qualified as a chartered accountant in 1987. He later resumed his university studies and graduated in economics in 2011.

Pierucci entered local politics in Camaiore in the 1990s. He was elected to the municipal council in 1998 and again in 2002. In 2012, he supported the election of Alessandro Del Dotto as mayor of Camaiore and subsequently joined his administration as an assessor, initially with responsibility for the budget, taxation and municipal companies. In September 2012, he became deputy mayor. Starting from 2017, Pierucci held responsibility for public works, municipal property and the municipal police.

Alongside his political career, Pierucci worked in the municipal pharmaceutical sector. He became general director of the Azienda Speciale Farmaceutica di Pietrasanta, where he was involved in the reorganisation of the company after a period of financial difficulties.

In the 2022 local elections, Pierucci was elected mayor of Camaiore in the first round as the candidate of a centre-left coalition supported by the Democratic Party. He received 59.09% of the vote, defeating centre-right candidate Claudia Bonuccelli, who received 36.12%, and Enrico Marchetti, who received 4.79%.

In September 2024, Pierucci was elected president of the Province of Lucca, defeating Mario Pardini, the mayor of Lucca, receiving approximately 55% of the weighted vote.
