= List of presidents of the Province of Lucca =

President of the Province of Lucca
- Presidente della Provincia di Lucca
- Incumbent; Marcello Pierucci since 30 September 2024
- Residence: Ducal Palace
- Term length: 4 years
- Inaugural holder: Cesare Del Prete
- Formation: 1889
- Deputy: Andrea Carrari

The president of the Province of Lucca is the head of the provincial government in Lucca, Tuscany, Italy. The president oversees the administration of the province, coordinates the activities of the municipalities, and represents the province in regional and national matters. The provincial government is headquartered in the Ducal Palace in Lucca, where the council chamber is located.

Since September 2024, the office has been held by Marcello Pierucci of the Democratic Party.

== List ==
=== Presidents of the Provincial Deputation (1889–1926) ===
No.	Portrait	Name	Term of office		Party
No.	Portrait	Name	Start	End	Party
1		Cesare Del Prete (1840–1904)	1889	1895	
2		Giocondo Giuntoli (18??–1916)	1895	1902	
3		Giovanni Enrico Anzilotti (18??–1924)	1902	1903	
4		Luigi Dinelli	1903	1907	
5		Francesco Bandoni	1907	1912	
6		Torquato Barsanti (18??–1919)	1912	27 July 1919	
7		Alberto Colzi	1919	1920	
(5)		Francesco Bandoni	1920	1921	
8		Giulio Paiotti (1883–1971)	1921	1923	
–		Prefectural commissioner	1923	1924	
9		Giovanni Sergiusti	1924	1926	

=== Presidents of the Provincial Rectorate (1927–1944) ===
No.	Portrait	Name	Term of office		Party
No.	Portrait	Name	Start	End	Party
		Gaddo della Gherardesca (1895–1981)	1929	1941	National Fascist Party

=== Presidents of the Provincial Deputation (1944–1951) ===
No.	Portrait	Name	Term of office		Party
No.	Portrait	Name	Start	End	Party
1		Italico Baccelli (1897–19??)	1944	1951	Christian Democracy

=== Presidents of the Province (1951–present) ===
No.	Portrait	Name	Term of office		Party
No.	Portrait	Name	Start	End	Party
1		Italico Baccelli (1897–19??)	1951	1956	Christian Democracy
		?	?	?	?
		Ildo Barsanti (1912–2005)	1960	1964	Christian Democracy
		Ildo Barsanti (1912–2005)	1964	1970	Christian Democracy
		?	?	?	?
		Giuseppe Bicocchi (1943–2008)	1975	1980	Christian Democracy
		Giuseppe Bicocchi (1943–2008)	1980	1985	Christian Democracy
		Piero Leonardo Andreucci (1937–2025)	16 October 1985	27 August 1990	Christian Democracy
		Franco Antonio Fanucchi (1942–1996)	27 August 1990	18 February 1992	Christian Democracy
		Piero Baccelli (1928–2017)	18 February 1992	1 December 1992	Christian Democracy
		Pier Giorgio Licheri (b. 1936)	29 January 1993	11 January 1994	Christian Democracy
		Enrico Grabau (1926–2020)	27 June 1994	4 March 1997	National Alliance
		Andrea Tagliasacchi (b. 1959)	12 May 1997	28 May 2001	Democrats of the Left
		Andrea Tagliasacchi (b. 1959)	28 May 2001	30 May 2006	Democrats of the Left
		Stefano Baccelli (b. 1965)	30 May 2006	19 May 2011	Democratic Party
		Stefano Baccelli (b. 1965)	19 May 2011	22 July 2015	Democratic Party
		Luca Menesini (b. 1973)	21 September 2015	16 December 2019	Democratic Party
		Luca Menesini (b. 1973)	16 December 2019	30 September 2024	Democratic Party
		Marcello Pierucci (b. 1964)	30 September 2024	incumbent	Democratic Party

== Sources ==
- Cifelli, Alberto (2008). L'istituto prefettizio dalla caduta del fascismo all'Assemblea costituente. I Prefetti della Liberazione (PDF). Rome: Scuola Superiore dell'Amministrazione dell'Interno. Archived from the original (PDF) on 2019-09-03.
- Menichini, Piera (2005). "I presidenti delle Province dall'Unità alla Grande guerra: repertorio analitico". Storia Amministrazione Costituzione (13): 259–260.
- Pesi, Emmanuel (2012). Dalla guerra alla democrazia: la ricostruzione in provincia di Lucca, 1944-1948. Lucca: Pacini-Fazzi.
