= Giulio Lazzarini =

Italian politician (1927–2020)

Mayor of Lucca
- In office 12 July 1994 – 8 June 1998
- Preceded by: Arturo Pacini
- Succeeded by: Pietro Fazzi

Personal details
- Born: 31 July 1927 Lucca, Tuscany, Italy
- Died: 31 July 2020 (aged 93) Lucca, Tuscany, Italy
- Party: Independent (centre-left)
- Occupation: accountant

Giulio Lazzarini (31 July 1927 – 31 July 2020) was an Italian politician.

He served as Mayor of Lucca, Tuscany from July 1994 to June 1998, leading a centre-left government formed by the Democratic Party of the Left, the Italian Republican Party and the Social Christians. He was the first leftist mayor in the history of Lucca and the first directly elected by the citizens.

Lazzarini died in Lucca on his 93rd birthday in 2020.

Political offices
| Preceded by Arturo Pacini | Mayor of Lucca; 1994–1998 | Succeeded by Pietro Fazzi |
