= Luca Menesini =

Italian politician (born 1973)

- Menesini in 2020

President of the Province of Lucca
- In office 21 September 2015 – 30 September 2024
- Preceded by: Stefano Baccelli
- Succeeded by: Marcello Pierucci

Mayor of Capannori
- In office 27 May 2014 – 25 June 2024
- Preceded by: Giorgio Del Ghingaro
- Succeeded by: Giordano Del Chiaro

Personal details
- Born: 1 April 1973 (age 53) Lucca, Tuscany, Italy
- Party: Democratic Party
- Occupation: Business manager

Luca Menesini (born 1 April 1973) is an Italian politician of the Democratic Party. He served as mayor of Capannori from 2014 to 2024 and as president of the Province of Lucca from 2015 to 2024.

== Career ==
Menesini was elected mayor of Capannori in the 2014 local elections, winning in the first round with 57.22% of the vote as the candidate of a centre-left coalition comprising the Democratic Party, Us Moderates and Left Ecology Freedom.

In September 2015, Menesini was elected president of the Province of Lucca, defeating Michele Giannini, the centre-right candidate and mayor of Fabbriche di Vergemoli, with 64% of the weighted vote.

He was re-elected mayor of Capannori in 2019 with 56.65% of the vote. In December 2019, he was re-elected president of the province, defeating Alberto Stefano Giovannetti, the mayor of Pietrasanta, with 55,685 weighted votes (72%).

Since January 2020, Menesini has been a member of the European Committee of the Regions (CoR), representing Italy as a member of the Party of European Socialists (PES) group. He has served on the Commission for Territorial Cohesion Policy and EU Budget (COTER) and the Commission for the Environment, Climate Change and Energy (ENVE). In February 2025, he was elected president of the PES Group in the European Committee of the Regions. In 2026, he served as CoR rapporteur on the proposed performance framework regulation for the Multiannual Financial Framework 2028–2034.
