= Arturo Pacini =

Italian politician (1925–2011)

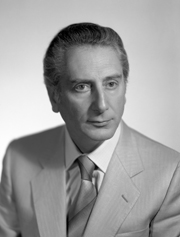

Mayor of Lucca
- In office 9 August 1990 – 19 October 1993
- Preceded by: Franco Antonio Fanucchi
- Succeeded by: Giulio Lazzarini

Member of the Senate
- In office 25 May 1972 – 1 July 1987

Personal details
- Born: 22 November 1925 Lucca, Tuscany, Italy
- Died: 8 December 2011 (aged 86) Lucca, Tuscany, Italy
- Party: Christian Democracy

Arturo Pacini (22 November 1925 – 8 December 2011) was an Italian politician who served as Senator for four legislatures (1972–1987) and Mayor of Lucca (1990–1993).

Political offices
Preceded by Franco Antonio Fanucchi	Mayor of Lucca; 1990-1993	Succeeded by Giulio Lazzarini
