= Cesare Del Prete =

Italian politician (1840–1904)

Member of the Chamber of Deputies
- In office 1880–1882

President of the Province of Lucca
- In office 1889–1895
- Succeeded by: Giocondo Giuntoli

Personal details
- Born: 11 September 1840 Viareggio, Duchy of Lucca
- Died: February 1904 (aged 63) Viareggio, Province of Lucca, Kingdom of Italy
- Occupation: Lawyer

Cesare Del Prete (11 September 1840 – February 1904) was an Italian lawyer and politician who served as deputy of the Kingdom of Italy (1880–1882) and as the first president of the Province of Lucca (1889–1895).
