= Timeline of Arezzo =

The following is a timeline of the history of the city of Arezzo in the Tuscany region of Italy.

== Prior to 18th century ==
- 4th century BCE – Etruscans build wall around Arretium.
- 294 BCE – Arretium attacked by Gallic forces.
- 1st century BCE – Roman amphitheatre of Arezzo built.
- 49 BCE – Arretium occupied by forces of Caesar.
- 337 CE – Roman Catholic Diocese of Arezzo established (approximate date).
- 1026 CE – Guido of Arezzo writes musical treatise Micrologus (approximate date).
- 1032 – Cathedral consecrated.
- 1111 – Arezzo sacked by forces of Henry V, Holy Roman Emperor.
- 13th century – Santa Maria della Pieve church remodelled.
- 1215 – University of Arezzo founded.
- 1248 – Guglielmino Ubertini becomes bishop.
- 1262 – Fraternita dei Laici founded.
- 1278 – Arezzo Cathedral construction begins.
- 1288 – Battle of Pieve al Toppo fought in Siena; Aretine forces win.
- 1289 – Battle of Campaldino fought near town; Florentines win.
- 1290 – Basilica of San Francesco, Arezzo, start of construction of church of St. Francis inside the city walls
- 1304 – Future poet Petrarch born in Arezzo.
- 1312 – Guido Tarlati becomes bishop.
- 1320 – Town wall built.
- 1375
  - Chiesa di San Bernardo (Arezzo) (church) built.
  - Palazzo della Fraternita dei Laici construction begins.
- 1384 – Enguerrand VII, Lord of Coucy sells Arezzo to Florentines; town becomes part of the Republic of Florence (until 1859).
- 1409 – Rebellion against Florentine rule.
- 1444 – Santa Maria delle Grazie church built.
- 1466 – Piero della Francesca paints Storie della Vera Croce in the Basilica of San Francesco, Arezzo.
- 1511 – Future artist Giorgio Vasari born in Arezzo.
- 1529 – Rebellion against Florentine rule.
- 1560 – Fortezza Medicea (Arezzo) (fortification) built (approximate date).

== 18th–19th centuries ==
- 1796 – Earthquake.
- 1799 – Anti-French Viva Maria (movement) active.
- 1808 – Arezzo becomes part of the French Arno (department).
- 1810 – Accademia Petrarca di Lettere, Arti e Scienze di Arezzo founded.^{(en)}
- 1833 – Teatro Petrarca (theatre) opens.
- 1860 – Circondario di Arezzo (administrative region) established.
- 1866 – Arezzo railway station opens.
- 1880 – Monumento ai Caduti del Risorgimento (monument) erected in the Piazza del Popolo.
- 1881 – Banca Mutua Popolare Aretina in business.
- 1886 – Ferrovia Appennino Centrale (railway) begins operating.
- 1888 – Ferrovia Casentinese (railway) begins operating.
- 1897 – Population: 45,289.

== 20th century ==
- 1911
  - Casa Vasari (museum) opens.
  - Population: 47,504.
- 1923 – Juventus Football Club Arezzo formed.
- 1925 – Palazzo della Provincia (Arezzo) built.
- 1930 – Ferrovia Arezzo-Sinalunga (railway) begins operating.
- 1934 – Politeama universale theatre built.
- 1937 – Museo archeologico statale Gaio Cilnio Mecenate (museum) opens.
- 1939 – Palazzo del Governo (Arezzo) built.
- 1944 – Arezzo War Cemetery established near city.
- 1961 – Stadio Comunale (stadium) opens.
- 1968 – Fiera Antiquaria di Arezzo (antique fair) begins.
- 1985 – May: Tuscan communal election, 1985 held.

== 21st century ==
- 2008 – Arezzo Courthouse built.
- 2013 – Population: 98,352.
- 2015
  - Alessandro Ghinelli becomes mayor.
  - 31 May: Tuscan regional election, 2015 held.

== See also ==
- History of Arezzo
- List of mayors of Arezzo
- List of bishops of Arezzo
- History of Tuscany

Other cities in the macroregion of Central Italy:^{(it)}

- Timeline of Ancona, Marche region
- Timeline of Florence, Tuscany region
- Timeline of Grosseto, Tuscany
- Timeline of Livorno, Tuscany
- Timeline of Lucca, Tuscany
- Timeline of Perugia, Umbria region
- Timeline of Pisa, Tuscany
- Timeline of Pistoia, Tuscany
- Timeline of Prato, Tuscany
- Timeline of Rome, Lazio region
- Timeline of Siena, Tuscany

== Bibliography ==
=== In English ===
- Edward Herbert Bunbury (1872) [1854]. "Arretium". In William Smith (ed.). Dictionary of Greek and Roman Geography. London: John Murray. hdl:2027/hvd.ah5cuq.
- "Arezzo", Central Italy and Rome: Handbook for Travellers (15th ed.), Leipzig: Karl Baedeker, 1909, OCLC 423237
- Ashby, Thomas (1910). "Arezzo" . Encyclopædia Britannica. Vol. 2 (11th ed.). pp. 456–457.
- Benjamin Vincent (1910), "Arezzo", Haydn's Dictionary of Dates (25th ed.), London: Ward, Lock & Co., hdl:2027/uc2.ark:/13960/t41r6xh8t
- Roy Domenico (2002). "Tuscany: Arezzo". Regions of Italy: a Reference Guide to History and Culture. Greenwood. pp. 324+. ISBN 0313307334.
- Alberto Fatucchi (2004). "Arezzo". In Christopher Kleinhenz (ed.). Medieval Italy: an Encyclopedia. Routledge. pp. 49–51. ISBN 0415939291.

=== In Italian ===
- Nicola Bernardini, ed. (1890). "Provincia di Arezzo". Guida della stampa periodica italiana (in Italian). Lecce: R. Tipografia editrice salentina dei fratelli Spacciante. hdl:2027/njp.32101074983378. (List of newspapers)
- Carlo Signorini (1904). Arezzo, citta y provincia: Guida illustrata (2nd ed.). Ettore Sinatti.
- "Arezzo", Enciclopedia Italiana (Treccani) (in Italian), 1929
- Vittorio Franchetti Pardo (1986). Arezzo. Città nella storia d’Italia. Bari. ISBN 8842027650.
- L. Berti; F. Rossi (1990). Arezzo: Guida turistica della città (in Italian). Comune di Arezzo. (Section available online: Arezzo un profilo storico)
- Annali aretini (in Italian), Fraternita dei Laici, ISSN 1126-232X 1993–
