= Timeline of Florence =

Coordinates: 43.783333°N 11.25°E

The following is a timeline of the history of the city of Florence, Tuscany, Italy.

The earliest timeline of Florence, the Annales florentini, was created in the 12th century.

== Prior to 14th century ==
- 59 BCE – Roman colony founded (approximate date).
- 1st century CE – Catholic Diocese of Florence established.
- 285 – Florence becomes seat of Tuscia region.
- 405 – Siege of Florence (405).
- 541 – Florence sacked by forces of Ostrogoth Totila.
- 1078 – City walls built.
- 1080 – Stone Ponte Vecchio (bridge) built.
- 1107 – Monte Orlandi and Prato become part of Florence.
- 1115–16 – Commune form of government adopted; Republic of Florence established.
- 1128 – Florence Baptistery built.
- 1138 – "City divided into six wards."
- 1182 – Arte di Calimala (cloth guild) first mentioned (approximate date).
- 1201 – Bankers' guild active (approximate date).
- 1222 – Monte comune (pawnshop) opens.
- 1230 – Eucharistic miracle of Florence allegedly occurs.
- 1237 – Ponte alle Grazie (bridge) built.
- 1244 – Venerabile Arciconfraternita della Misericordia di Firenze founded.
- 1251 – First Capitano del popolo elected.
- 1252
  - Mint established; Florin (Italian coin) introduced.
  - Santa Trinita bridge built.
- 1258 – Bargello built.
- 1261 – Public prison established.
- 1267 – Charles of Anjou in power.
- 1269 – Flood.
- 1282 – "Florence adopts a new system of government by members of a guild."
- 1284 – Tertio Cerchio (wall) built.
- 1285 – Hospital of Santa Maria Nuova founded.
- 1289
  - Slavery abolished.
  - Fire.
- 1299 – Palazzo Vecchio construction begins.

== 14th–16th centuries ==
- 1312 – Siege of Florence (1312)
- 1321 – University of Florence founded.
- 1333 – November: Flood.^{(it)}
- 1345 – Ponte Vecchio rebuilt.
- 1348 – Black Death plague.
- 1350 – October: Petrarch visits Florence and stays at Boccaccio's home.
- 1353 – Public clock installed in Palazzo Vecchio tower.
- 1355 – Chiesa di Santa Maria del Fiore a Lapo (church) built.
- 1360 – Cathedral Campanile built.
- 1361 – After the failed coup, Boccaccio left Florence to reside in Certaldo.
- 1361-1362 – Boccaccio composed De Mulieribus Claris (On Famous Women).
- 1370 - Boccaccio completed his last autograph manuscript of The Decameron (Ms Berliner Hamilton 90).
- 1375-1378 – War of the Eight Saints
- 1377 – Medici in power.
- 1378-1382 – Ciompi Revolt.
- 1382 – Loggia dei Lanzi built.
- 1385 – Basilica of Santa Croce built.
- 1390-1402 – Florentine–Milanese Wars.
- 1397 – Ancient Greek teaching begins at the University of Florence.
- 1397 – Medici Bank established.
- 1401 – Ghiberti wins the competition to create the Florence Baptistry doors..
- 1403-1424 Lorenzo Ghiberti sculpted 28 reliefs for the North Doors of the Florence Baptistery
- 1415 – Bruni's History of Florence issued.
- 1415 – Cosimo de' Medici weds Contessina de' Bardi.
- 1419 – Giovanni di Bicci de’ Medici commissions Filippo Brunelleschi to rebuild the Basilica of San Lorenzo.
- 1426-1428 Masaccio painted the Holy Trinity
- 1427 – Catasto tax begins.
- 1432 – Ufficiali di Notte tribunal begins.
- 1434 – 23 June: Pope Eugene IV arrives in Florence, having fled Rome.
- 1434 – 6 October: Cosimo de' Medici in power.
- 1435 – The publication of Leon Battista Alberti’s treatise De Pictura.
- 1435-1440 Donatello sculpted David (bronze) for the Medici family
- 1436 – Filippo Brunelleschi Completion of Brunelleschi’s Dome on Santa Maria del Fiore.
- 1436 – Duomo consecrated.
- 1440 – June 29: Florence wins the Battle of Anghiari.
- 1444 – Construction of the Palazzo Medici Riccardi starts.
- 1445 – Ospedale degli Innocenti formally opens.
- 1455 – The incomplete written manuscript of Lorenzo Ghiberti’s I Commentarii (Commentaries), which includes the first written biography of an artist from the Italian Renaissance
- 1464 – 1 August: Cosimo de' Medici dies.
- 1465 – March 16: Cosimo de' Medici is named Pater Patriae.
- 1469 – Lorenzo de' Medici assumes power
- 1471 – Printing press in operation.
- 1472 – Leonardo da Vinci becomes a Master Painter in Florence.
- 1476 – First performance of Terence's Andria (comedy) in Florence.
- 1478 – April 26: Pazzi conspiracy against the Medici.
  - 1478 – 1 June: Pope Sixtus IV issues papal bull excommunicating Lorenzo de' Medici and Florence.
- 1478-1483 – Lucrezia Tornabuoni commissions the epic poem Morgante from Luigi Pulci.
- 1484 – January: Marsilio Ficino publishes Plato's works translated into Latin.
- 1484-1486 – Sandro Botticelli painted The Birth of Venus
- 1485 – The publication of the first printed book on architectural theory: Leon Battista Alberti’s treatise De re aedificatoria (On the Art of Building)
- 1487 – Medici giraffe arrives.
- 1488 – Ancient Greek poet Homer first published in print.
- 1490 – Palazzo Cocchi-Serristori built.
- 1492
  - Lorenzo the Magnificent dies and is succeeded by Piero the Unfortunate.
  - Michelangelo creates the Battle of the Centaurs relief.
- 1494
  - Charles VIII of France invades the Italian peninsula.
  - Piero II acquiesces to Charles VIII and is forced to flee Florence.
  - Republic of Florence restored, ruled nominally by Girolamo Savonarola
  - 1494 – Salone dei Cinquecento built in the Palazzo Vecchio.
- 1497 – 7 February: Bonfire of the Vanities in Florence.
- 1498
  - Niccolò Machiavelli becomes secretary to the Second Chancery.
  - 23 May: Savonarola executed.
- 1503 – Leonardo da Vinci begins painting a portrait of Mona Lisa Gherardini del Giocondo.
- 1504 – Michelangelo's David sculpture installed in the Piazza della Signoria.
- 1509 – Militia established.
- 1512
  - Florentine Republic dissolved after defeat by Papal forces under Medici control.
  - Piero Soderini and Niccolò Machiavelli exiled.
- 1513
  - Giulio de Medici becomes Archbishop of Florence.
  - Machiavelli publishes The Prince
- 1517 – Machiavelli publishes Discourses on Livy
- 1519 – June: the Sagrestia Nuova of the Basilica of San Lorenzo, planned.
- 1527 – 21 June: Machiavelli dies
- 1529 – 24 October: Siege of Florence (1529–30) begins.
- 1532 – Alessandro de Medici becomes duke of the Florentine Republic.
- 1536 – Holy Roman Emperor Charles V visits city.
- 1537
  - Villani's Nuova Cronica published.
  - Cosimo I moves into the Palazzo della Signoria.
  - Giorgio Vasari was commissioned by Cosimo I to expand and redesign the Palazzo della Signoria (Palazzo Vecchio)
- March 29, 1539 – Cosimo I de' Medici marries Eleanor of Toledo.
- 1545 – Orto Botanico di Firenze established.
- 1549 – Eleanor of Toledo purchases the Palazzo Pitti.
- 1550 – the Medici ducal family moves into the Palazzo Pitti.
- 1550 – The publication of Vasari’s Lives of the Most Excellent Painters, Sculptors, and Architects
- 1557 – September: Flood.^{(it)}
- 1559 – Palazzo Uguccioni built.
- 1560-1581 – The building of Galleria degli Uffizi was initiated by Giorgio Vasari.
- 1562 – Accademia del Disegno established.
- 1564 – Vasari Corridor built.
- 1565 – Fountain of Neptune inaugurated.
- 1569 – Ponte Santa Trinita (bridge) rebuilt.
- 1569 – late August: Cosimo I de' Medici becomes the first Grand Duke of Tuscany.
- 1570-1574 – Giorgio Vasari begins The Last Judgement frescoes in the dome of Florence Cathedral; completed by Federico Zuccari.
- 1573 – 14 January: First meeting of the Florentine Camerata.
- 1580 – Rules of Calcio Fiorentino sport published.
- 1581 – Uffizi art museum built.
- 1582 – State Archives of Tuscany established.
- 1592 – Theorbo musical instrument invented.
- 1598 – Premiere of Peri's opera Dafne.
- 1600
  - 5 October: Wedding of Maria de 'Medici and Henry IV of France.
  - Biblioteca Riccardiana founded (approximate date).
  - Premiere of Peri's opera Euridice.

== 17th–19th centuries ==
- 1625 – Premiere of Francesca Caccini's opera La liberazione di Ruggiero.
- 1656 – Teatro della Pergola built.
- 1700 – Fortepiano musical instrument prototyped.
- 1739 – Academia Botanica established.
- 1740 – Teatro di Santa Maria built.
- 1753 – Accademia dei Georgofili established.
- 1775 – Museo di Storia Naturale di Firenze established.
- 1784 – Galleria dell'Accademia established.
- 1799 – French occupation begins.
- 1814
  - French occupation ends.
  - Jewish ghetto abolished.
- 1817 – Teatro Goldoni opens.
- 1828 – Teatro Alfieri opens.
- 1844 – 3 November: Florence flood of 1844.
- 1847 – Premiere of Verdi's opera Macbeth.
- 1848
  - Prato-Florence railway begins operating.
  - Firenze Santa Maria Novella railway station opens.
- 1852 – State Archives of Florence established.
- 1859 – La Nazione newspaper begins publication.
- 1861
  - National Library active.
  - Population: 150,864.
- 1862 – Politeama Fiorentino Vittorio Emanuele amphitheatre opens.
- 1864 – Florence becomes part of Italy.
- 1865 – Italian capital relocated to Florence from Turin.
- 1867 – Società Geografica Italiana headquartered in Florence.
- 1871
  - Palazzo delle Assicurazioni Generali built.
  - Population: 167,093.
- 1879 – Horse-drawn tram begins operating.
- 1882 – Great Synagogue of Florence built.
- 1891 – Cathedral Museum opens.
- 1896 – Firenze Campo di Marte railway station opens.
- 1897
  - Leo S. Olschki Editore in business.
  - Population: 209,540.

== 20th century ==
- 1901 – Population: 236,635.
- 1904 – Giardino Tropicale established.
- 1908 – La Voce magazine begins publication.
- 1922 – Cinema Teatro Savoia opens.
- 1925 – Non Mollare newspaper begins publication.
- 1926 – Chiesa di Santa Maria a Ricorboli (church) built.
- 1931 – Population: 304,160.
- 1933 – Maggio Musicale Fiorentino begins.
- 1934 – Bologna–Florence railway begins operating.
- 1936 – Cinema Vittoria built.
- 1943
  - German occupation begins.
  - 25 September: Aerial bombing by Allied forces.
- 1944
  - 3 August: Bridges bombed by German forces.
  - 11 August: German occupation ends.
- 1948 – Ponte alla Carraia (bridge) rebuilt.
- 1954 – 27 October: 1954 UFO sighting in Florence
- 1957 – Ponte Amerigo Vespucci (bridge) built.
- 1959 – Giardino dell'Iris (garden) established.
- 1961 – Population: 436,516.
- 1966 – 4 November: 1966 Flood of the Arno River.
- 1968 – Ospedale Piero Palagi (hospital) built.
- 1977 – Florence–Rome high-speed railway begins operating.
- 1978 – Indiano Bridge built.
- 1982 – Historic Centre of Florence designated an UNESCO World Heritage Site.
- 1986 – Gran Caffè Doney closes.
- 1991 – Population: 403,294.
- 1993 – 27 May: Via dei Georgofili bombing.
- 1995 – European Rapid Operational Force headquartered in Florence.
- 1997 – City website online (approximate date).

== 21st century ==
- 2001 – Population: 356,118.
- 2002 – November: European Social Forum held in city.
- 2009
  - Bologna–Florence high-speed railway begins operating.
  - Matteo Renzi becomes mayor.
- 2011 – 13 December: 2011 Florence shootings.
- 2013 – Population: 366,039 city; 987,354 province.
- 2014 – Dario Nardella becomes mayor.
- 2015 – City becomes capital of the newly created Metropolitan City of Florence.

== See also ==
- History of Florence
- List of mayors of Florence
- State Archives of Florence (state archives)

Other cities in the macroregion of Central Italy:^{(it)}

- Timeline of Ancona, Marche region
- Timeline of Arezzo, Tuscany region
- Timeline of Grosseto, Tuscany
- Timeline of Livorno, Tuscany
- Timeline of Lucca, Tuscany
- Timeline of Perugia, Umbria region
- Timeline of Pisa, Tuscany
- Timeline of Pistoia, Tuscany
- Timeline of Prato, Tuscany
- Timeline of Rome, Lazio region
- Timeline of Siena, Tuscany

== Bibliography ==
- Giuseppe Maria Mecatti (1755). Storia chronologica della città di Firenze [Chronological history of the city of Florence] (in Italian). Napoli: Stamperia Simoniana. (1977 reprint)
- J. Willoughby Rosse (1858). "Florence". Index of Dates ... Facts in the Chronology and History of the World. London: H.G. Bohn. hdl:2027/uva.x030807786 – via HathiTrust.
- George Henry Townsend (1867), "Florence", A Manual of Dates (2nd ed.), London: Frederick Warne & Co.
- William Henry Overall, ed. (1870). "Florence". Dictionary of Chronology. London: William Tegg. hdl:2027/uc2.ark:/13960/t9m32q949.
- William Smith, ed. (1872) [1854]. "Florentia". Dictionary of Greek and Roman Geography. London: John Murray. hdl:2027/hvd.ah5cuq.
- Ismar Elbogen (1906), "Florence", Jewish Encyclopedia
- Edgcumbe Staley (1906). "Chronology". Guilds of Florence. London: Methuen & Co. hdl:2027/uc1.$b94514.
- Benjamin Vincent (1910), "Florence", Haydn's Dictionary of Dates (25th ed.), London: Ward, Lock & Co.
- "Florence", Northern Italy (14th ed.), Leipzig: Karl Baedeker, 1913, hdl:2027/uc2.ark:/13960/t7rn3cv1g
- Edmund G. Gardner (1920). Story of Florence. Mediaeval towns. London: J. M. Dent & Co.
- Millard Meiss (1951). "Chronological Table". Painting in Florence and Siena After the Black Death: the Arts, Religion, and Society in the Mid-fourteenth Century. Princeton University Press. ISBN 0-691-00312-2.
- Athanasios Moulakis (1998). "Chronology of Florentine Institutional Development". Republican Realism in Renaissance Florence. Rowman & Littlefield. ISBN 978-0-8476-8994-1.
- Michael Levey (1996). "Selective Chronology". Florence: A Portrait. Harvard University Press. ISBN 978-0-674-30658-5.
- Ted Jones (2013). "Chronology of Events". Florence And Tuscany: a Literary Guide for Travellers. I.B.Tauris. ISBN 978-1-84885-836-7.
