= Pier Giorgio Licheri =

Italian politician

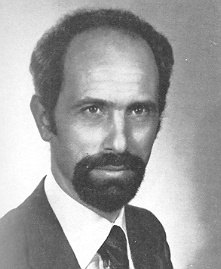

Member of the Chamber of Deputies
- In office 1976–1979

President of the Province of Lucca
- In office 29 January 1993 – 11 January 1994
- Preceded by: Piero Baccelli
- Succeeded by: Enrico Grabau

Personal details
- Born: 26 May 1936 (age 90) Florence, Kingdom of Italy
- Party: Christian Democracy
- Occupation: Civil servant

Pier Giorgio Licheri (born 26 May 1936) is an Italian politician who served as a member of the Chamber of Deputies from 1976 to 1979 and as president of the Province of Lucca in 1993–1994.

In 2018, he was elected president of the National Centre for Volunteering.
