= Stefano Baccelli =

Italian politician

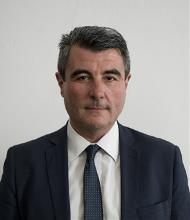

Regional assessor for Transports and Urban planning of Tuscany
- In office 22 October 2020 – 11 October 2025
- President: Eugenio Giani

Member of the Regional Council of Tuscany
- In office 17 June 2015 – 22 September 2020

President of the Province of Lucca
- In office 30 May 2006 – 22 July 2015
- Preceded by: Andrea Tagliasacchi
- Succeeded by: Luca Menesini

Personal details
- Born: 16 July 1965 (age 61) Lucca, Italy
- Party: Democratic Party
- Occupation: Lawyer

Stefano Baccelli (born 16 July 1965) is an Italian lawyer and politician, member of the Democratic Party. He has served as president of the Province of Lucca and as a member of the Regional Council of Tuscany.

== Life and career ==
Baccelli worked as a lawyer in Lucca. He is the son of Piero Baccelli and grandson of Italico Baccelli, both former mayors of Lucca and presidents of the province.

He began his political activity in the youth wing of the Christian Democracy, later joining the Italian People's Party and then The Daisy, where he held local and regional leadership roles. He was elected president of the Province of Lucca in 2006 and re-elected in 2011, serving until 2014. In 2015 he was elected to the Regional Council of Tuscany for the Democratic Party, obtaining over 12,000 preference votes in the province of Lucca.

In 2018 he ran for the Italian Chamber of Deputies in the Lucca constituency but was not elected.

From 2020 to 2025, he served as regional assessor for Infrastructure, Transport, Urban Planning in the regional government led by president Eugenio Giani.
