= Italico Baccelli =

Italian politician and architect

Mayor of Lucca
- In office 27 November 1960 – 16 January 1965
- Preceded by: Tito Giovanni Marchetti
- Succeeded by: Giovanni Martinelli

President of the Province of Lucca
- In office 1944–1956

Personal details
- Born: 6 November 1897 Lucca, Kingdom of Italy
- Died: ?
- Party: Christian Democracy
- Occupation: Architect

Italico Baccelli (6 November 1897 – ?) was an Italian politician of the Christian Democracy party. He served as the first President of the Province of Lucca after World War II and as mayor of Lucca from 1960 to 1965.

== Life and career ==
In 1944, following the liberation of Italy, Baccelli was appointed president of the Provincial Deputation of Lucca by the local Committee of National Liberation. He remained in office until the 1951 provincial elections, after which he became the first president of the Province of Lucca, serving until 1956.

Baccelli later served as mayor of Lucca from 1960 to 1965. He belonged to a prominent political family: his son, Piero Baccelli, served as mayor of Lucca between 1985 and 1988, while his grandson, Stefano Baccelli, was president of the province from 2006 to 2015.
