= Giuseppe Bicocchi =

Italian politician

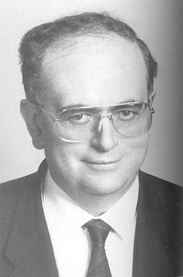

Member of the Chamber of Deputies
- In office 1992–1994
- In office 1996–2001

Member of the Regional Council of Tuscany
- In office 21 May 1985 – 11 January 1992

President of the Province of Lucca
- In office 1975–1985

Personal details
- Born: 18 July 1943 Manciano, Province of Grosseto, Kingdom of Italy
- Died: 18 February 2008 (aged 64) Lucca, Tuscany, Italy
- Party: Christian Democracy; Segni Pact

Giuseppe Bicocchi (18 July 1943 – 18 February 2008) was an Italian politician who served as president of the Province of Lucca, member of the Regional Council of Tuscany, and Deputy in the Italian Parliament. In 2006, he was appointed president of the Stella Maris Foundation, a scientific institute for child and adolescent neuropsychiatry.
