= Ildo Barsanti =

Italian politician and engineer

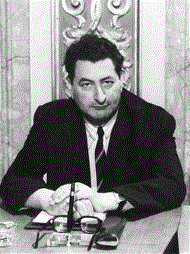

Member of the Regional Council of Tuscany
- In office 1970–1975

President of the Province of Lucca
- In office 1960–1970

Personal details
- Born: 6 September 1912 Borgo a Mozzano, Province of Lucca, Kingdom of Italy
- Died: 8 October 2005 (aged 93) Barga, Tuscany, Italy
- Party: Christian Democracy
- Occupation: Engineer

Ildo Barsanti (6 September 1912 – 8 October 2005) was an Italian engineer and politician of the Christian Democracy party. He served as president of the Province of Lucca and as a member of the first Regional Council of Tuscany.

== Life and career ==
Born in Borgo a Mozzano, in the province of Lucca, Barsanti graduated in engineering and worked professionally in Barga.

He was active in the Christian Democracy (DC) party, serving on the provincial board of Lucca from 1949 to 1955. He then served as provincial assessor for public works from 1951 to 1960, before becoming president of the Province of Lucca (1960–1970).

During his tenure, he also held positions in several public bodies, including the National Association of Italian Provinces (UPI), the Regional Union of Tuscan Provinces (URPT), the National Work for Motherhood and Childhood (ONMI), and the Provincial Red Cross.

In 1970 he was elected to the Regional Council of Tuscany with 14,050 votes in the Lucca constituency, serving as vice-chair of the Education, Culture and Social Security Commission until 1975.
