= Timeline of the city of Rome =

The city of Rome, Italy, has had an extensive history since antiquity.

== Early history ==
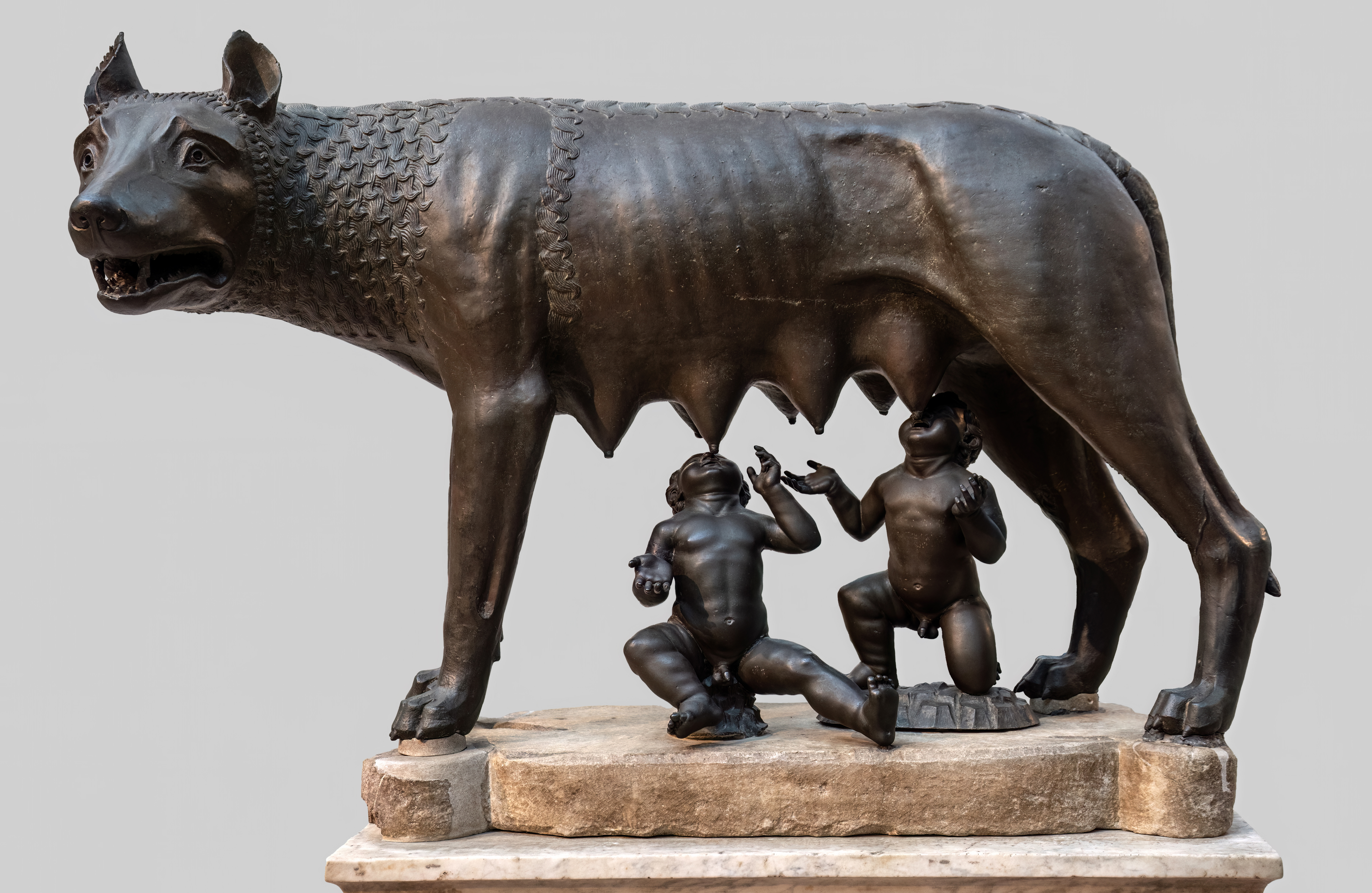
Tradition states that Romulus and Remus were raised by a wolf before founding Rome in 753 BC.

- 1000 BC – Latins begin to settle in Italy
- 753 BC - City of Rome established by Romulus and Remus according to Livius.

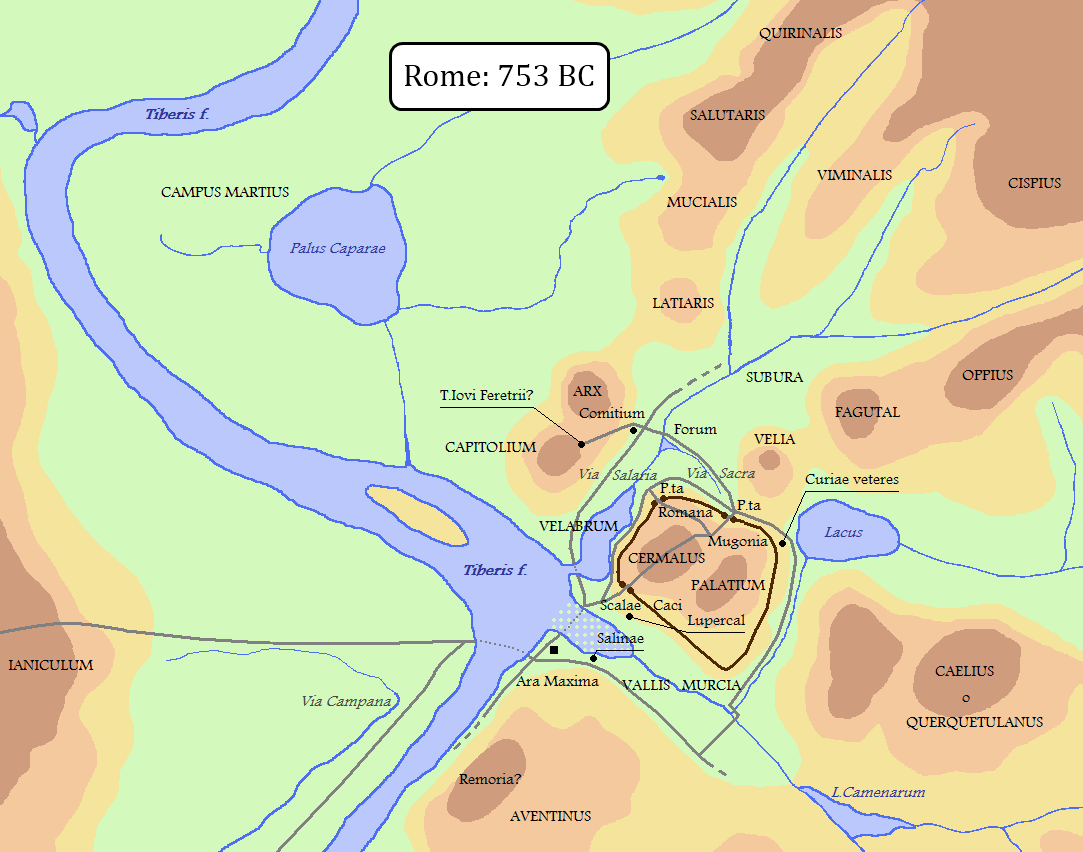
A map of Rome in 753 BC. Colours show topography, with green lowlands and brown highlands. The Latin names of hills are included in all caps.

- After 578 BC Servius Tullius built a circum wall around Rome.

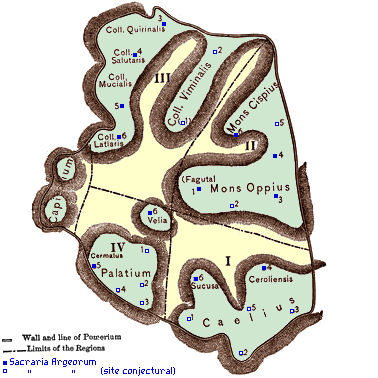
A map of the City of the Four Regions, roughly corresponding to the city limits during the later kingdom. The division is traditionally, though probably incorrectly, attributed to Servius Tullius

== Republic ==
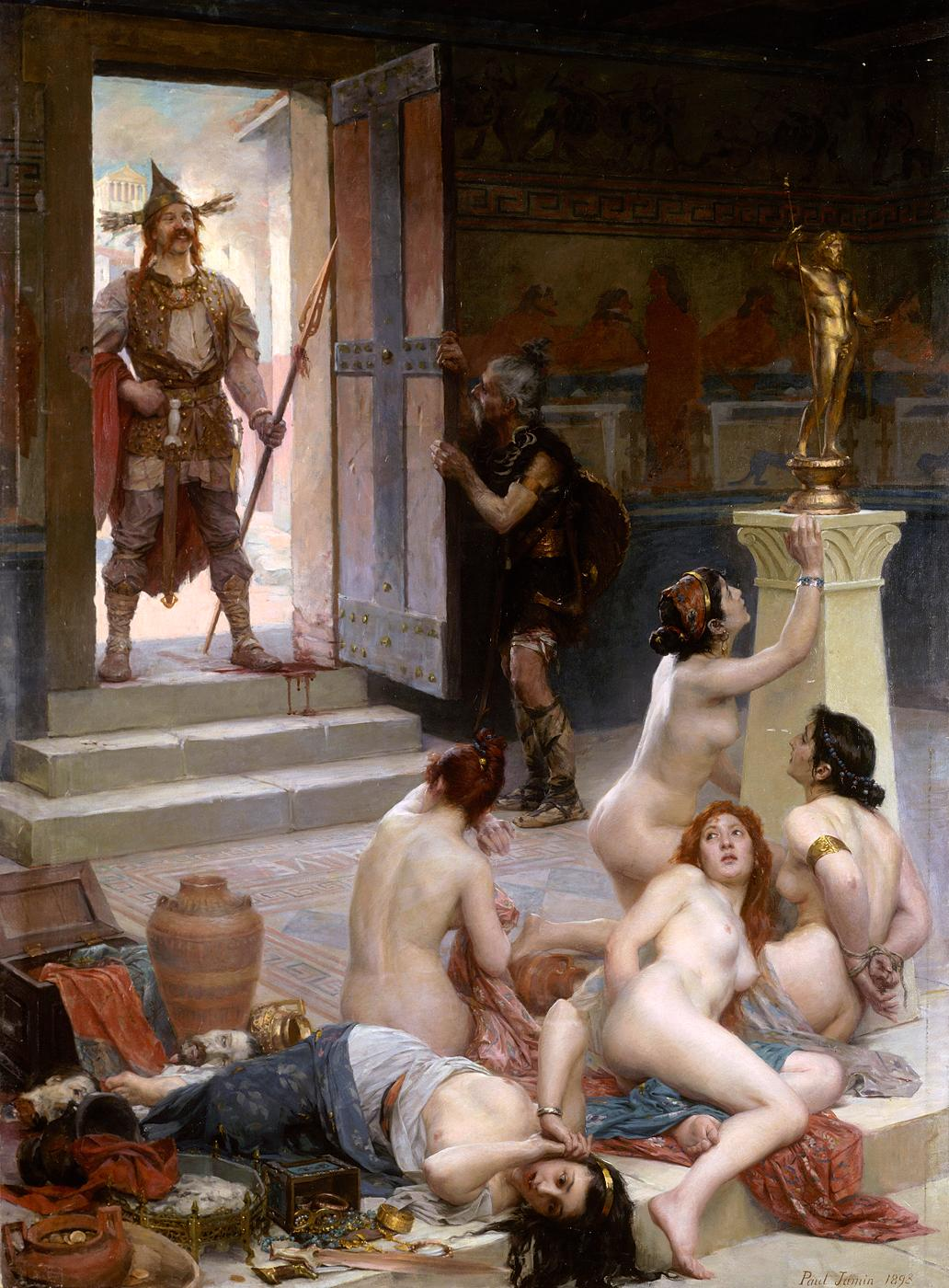
19th-century painting of the Gallic leader Brennus looting Rome after the Battle of the Allia in 390 BC

- 499 BC - A battle against foreign tribes commences, including the construction of the Temple of Castor and Pollux.
- 396 BC - The Etruscan city of Veio is defeated by the Romans
- 390 BC - Rome is sacked by the Gauls after the Battle of the Allia
- 380 BC - The once destroyed Servian Wall is reconstructed.
- 312 BC - The Via Appia and Aqua Appia are constructed.
- 264 - 241 BC - First Punic War
- 220 BC - Via Flaminia is constructed.
- 218 - 202 BC - Second Punic War
- 168 BC - The Romans have a great victory in the Macedonian War, conquering Greece.
- 149 - 146 BC - The Third Punic War
- 133 BC - 120 BC - The Gracchi brothers are controversially killed.
- 71 BC - Spartacus is killed and his rebel army destroyed.
- 60 BC - Pompey, Crassus and Caesar form the first triumvirate.
- 59 BC - Handwritten "news posters" introduced.
- 55 BC - Theatre of Pompey completed.
- 49 BC - Caesar crosses the Rubicon in order to take Rome.
- 44 BC - Caesar elects himself dictator, and in March is killed by Brutus and Cassius

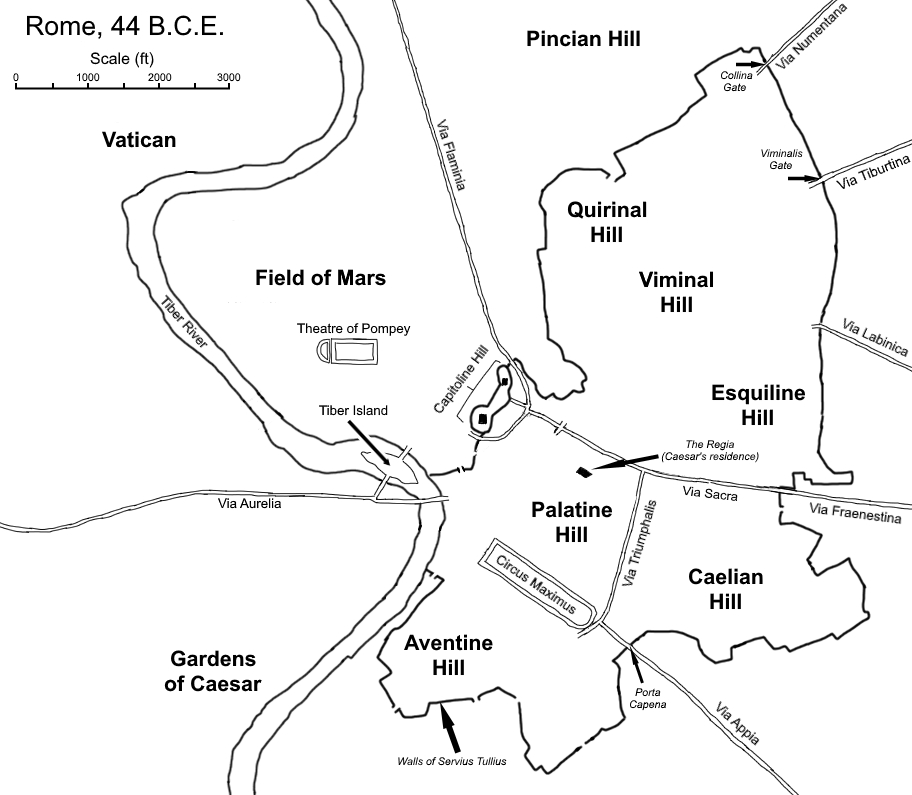
Map of the city of Rome in 44 BC

== Imperial city ==
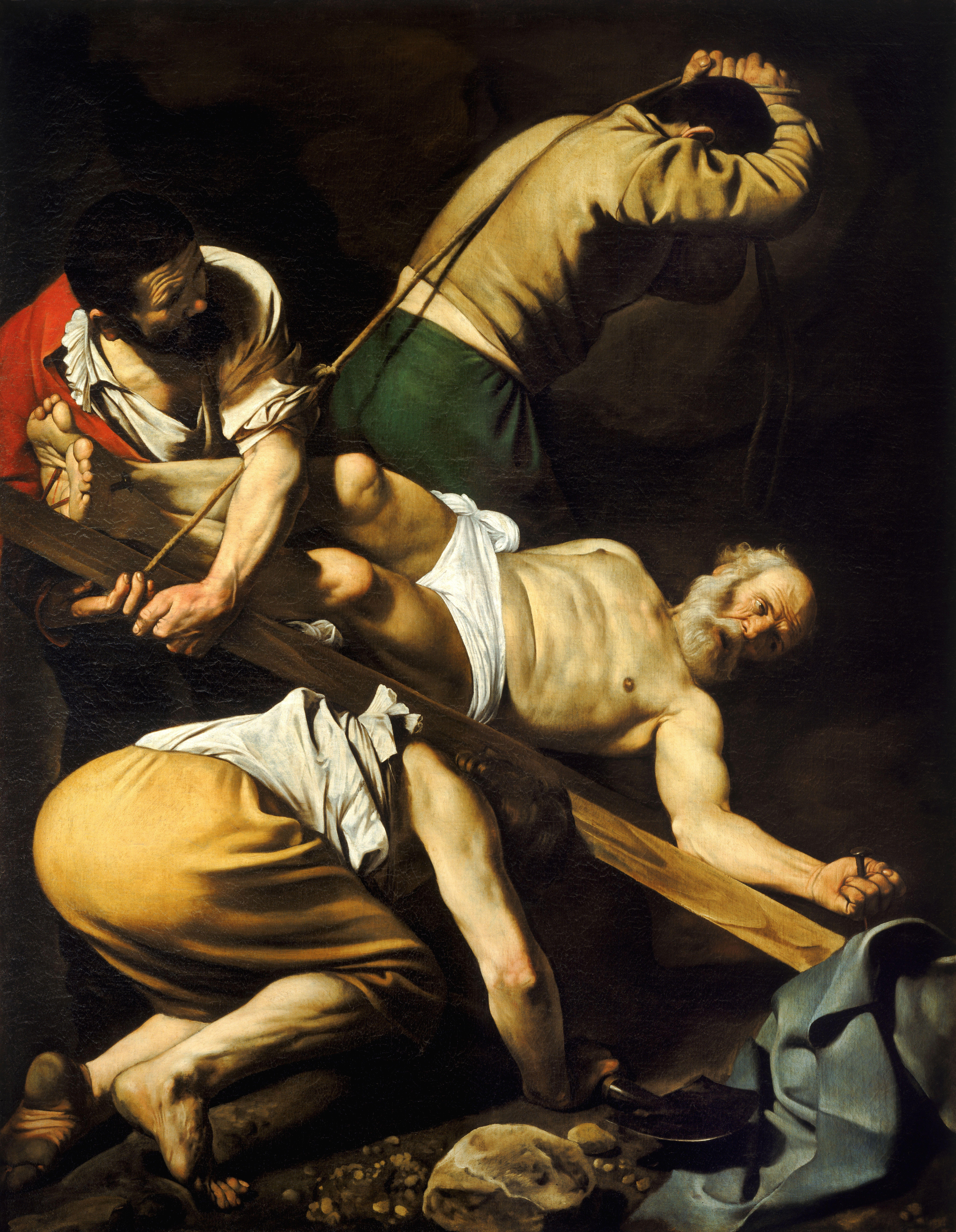
St Peter, regarded in Catholic tradition as the first Pope, is believed to have been crucified in Rome during the reign of Nero (c. 64–67 AD).

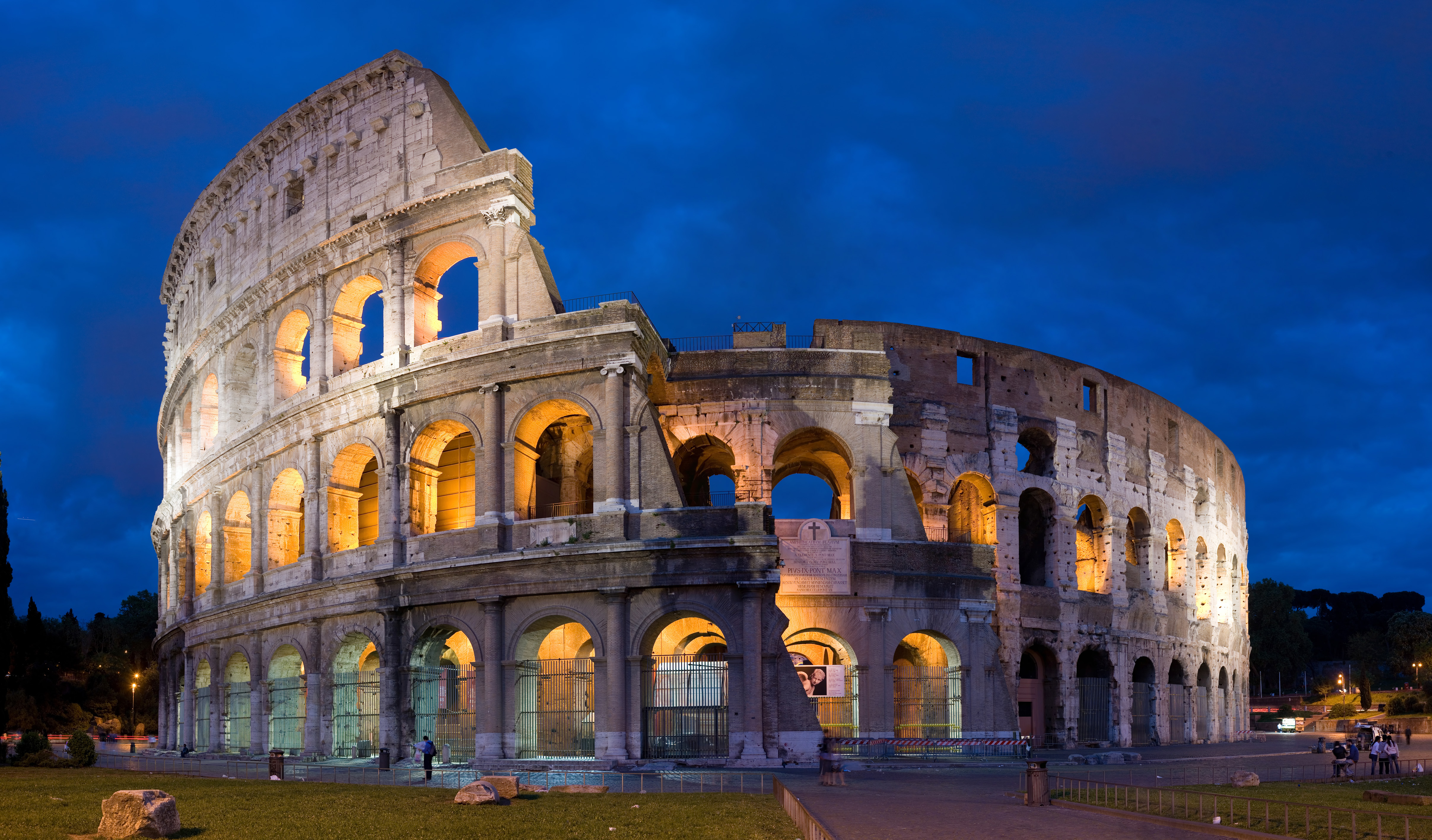
The Colosseum opened in 80 AD

- 27 BC - Augustus is made Rome's first emperor.
- 13 BC - The Senate commissions the Ara Pacis to honor Augustus' return to Rome.
- c. 60 AD - Paul the Apostle arrives in Rome.
- 64 AD - The Great Fire of Rome, rumored to be blamed by Nero on the Christians.
- c. 65 AD - Blamed for causing the Great Fire, Christians in the city are persecuted.
- 72 AD - Work on the Flavian Amphitheatre (Colosseum) begins.
- 80 AD - While Titus is inspecting the damage of the eruption of Vesuvius, a fire breaks out in the city for three days, destroying Capitoline temples and the Pantheon.
- 125 AD - Emperor Hadrian has the Pantheon reconstructed, assuming its current appearance.
- 212 AD - All the inhabitants of the empire are granted citizenship of Rome.
- 216 AD - Work on the Baths of Caracalla is completed.
- 217 AD - Fire, possibly caused by a lightning strike, damages the Flavian Amphitheatre.
- 225 AD - Mathematicians allowed to teach publicly at Rome.
- 247 AD - The first millennium of Rome is celebrated.
- 270 AD - Construction of the Aurelian Wall begins.

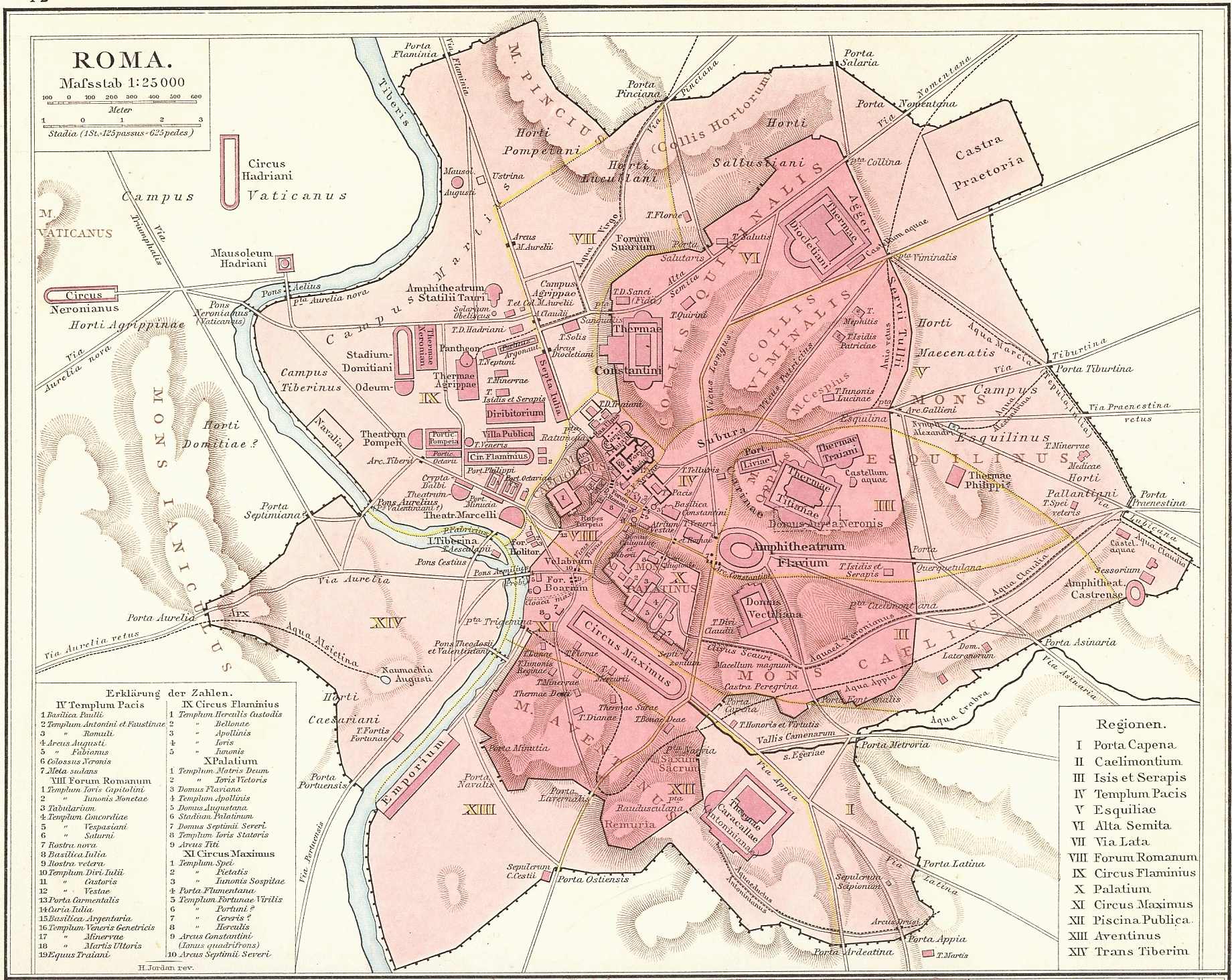
Aurelian wall around 280 AD

- 274 AD - The Temple of the Sun built at Rome.
- 284 AD - Diocletian partitions administration of the Roman Empire in half, thereby establishing the Eastern Roman Empire in Byzantium.

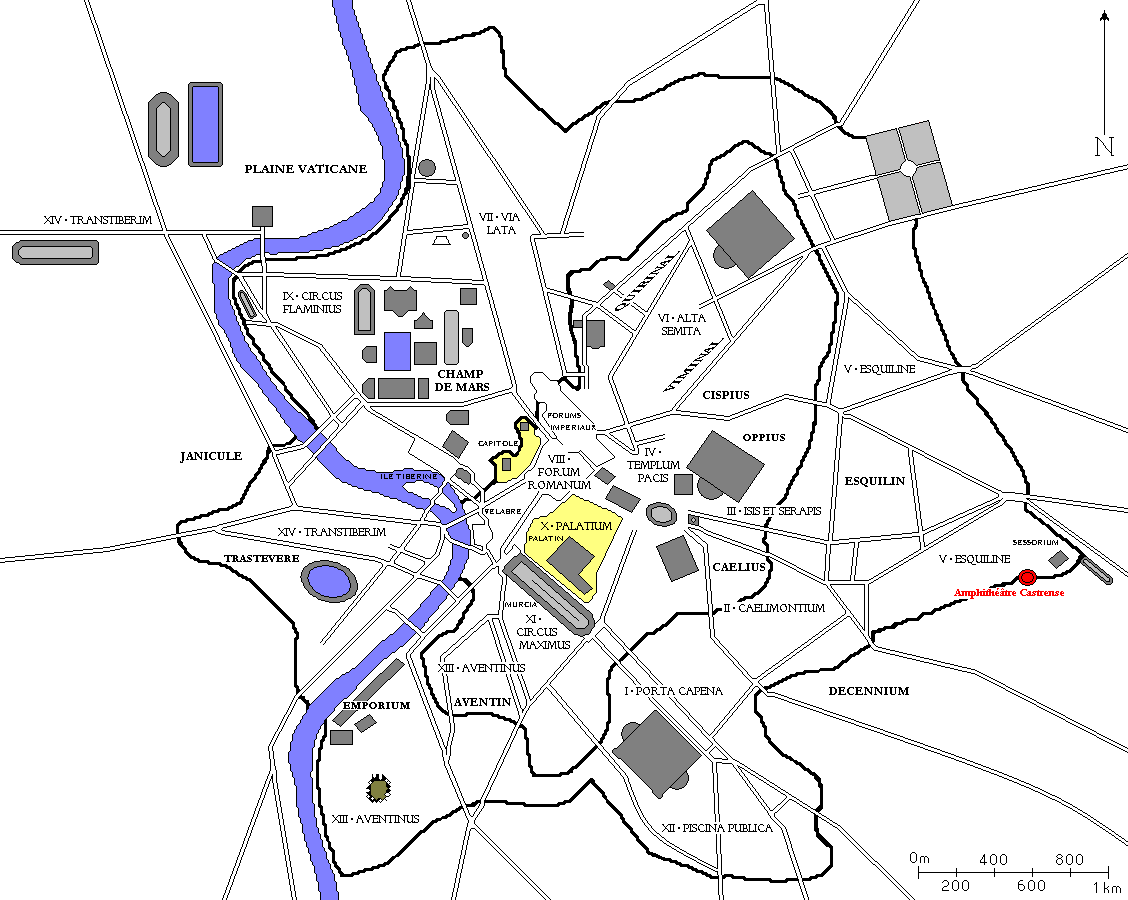
The most important buildings inside city of late ancient Rome

== Late antiquity and early medieval period ==
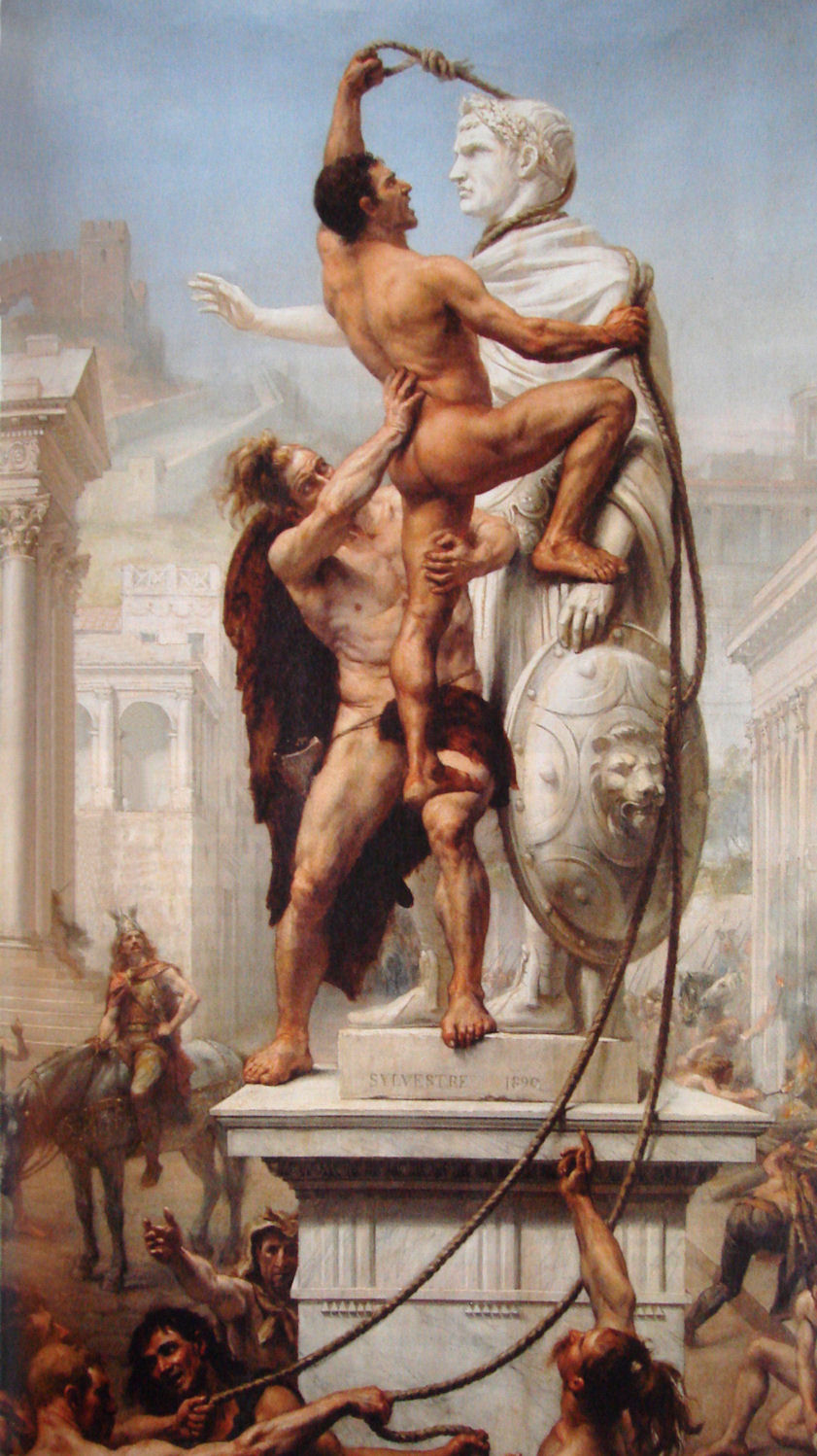
19th-century painting of the Visigothic Sack of Rome in 410 AD

- 312 - Constantine the Great defeats Maxentius at Battle of the Milvian Bridge to become the ruler of the western Roman Empire
- c.320 - Old St. Peter's Basilica is constructed.
- 325- Constantine convenes the First Council of Nicaea.
- 380 - The Christian emperor Theodosius makes Christianity the official religion of Rome, persecuting pagans and destroying temples.
- 402 - Ravenna becomes the capital of the Western Roman Empire, whilst Constantinople that of the east.
- 410 - Rome is sacked by Alaric, King of the Visigoths
- 422 - The Church of Santa Sabina is founded.
- 455 - Rome is sacked by Genseric, King of the Vandals
- 476 - Romulus Augustulus is deposed, traditionally considered the end of the Western Roman Empire and the beginning of the Middle Ages in Europe. Constantinople continues to be the capital of the Eastern Roman Empire.
- 496 - The first pope to achieve the Pontifex Maximus is Anastasius II.
- 536 - Rome is recovered for the Roman Empire by Belisarius.
- 546 - Rome is sacked by Totila, King of the Ostrogoths.
- c. 590 - 604 - Pope Gregory the Great makes the Christian church exceedingly strong.
- 609 - The Pantheon becomes a Christian church.
- 630 - The Church of Sant' Agnese is the first Roman church to be constructed in Byzantine style.
- 725 - The King Ine of Wessex is the first man to create a hostel for pilgrims to Rome.
- 774 - Charlemagne, King of the Franks, conquers Italy.
- 800 - Charlemagne is crowned Roman emperor in St. Peter's Basilica.
- 801 - An earthquake damages St. Paul's Outside the Walls on 29 April.
- 846 - During the Arab raid against Rome the moors plundered the environs of the city, including Old St. Peter's Basilica, but they were prevented from entering the city itself by the Aurelian Wall
- 880 - 932 - A rare occasion, the city is governed by women, Theodora and later her daughter Marozia.
- 961 - King Otto the Great of Germany becomes in Rome the first Holy Roman Emperor.

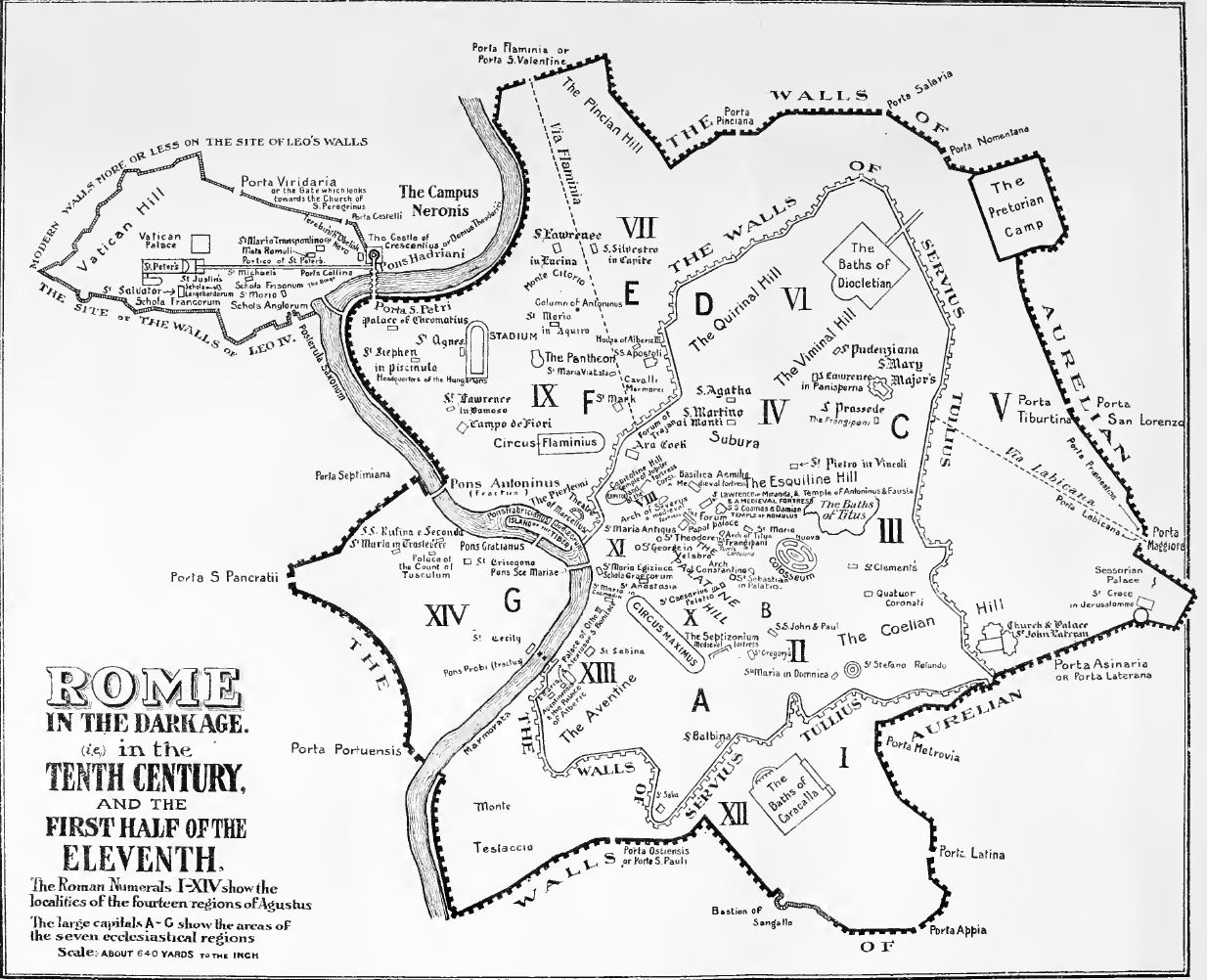
A map of the city of Rome in the 10th and 11th centuries

== High Middle Ages ==
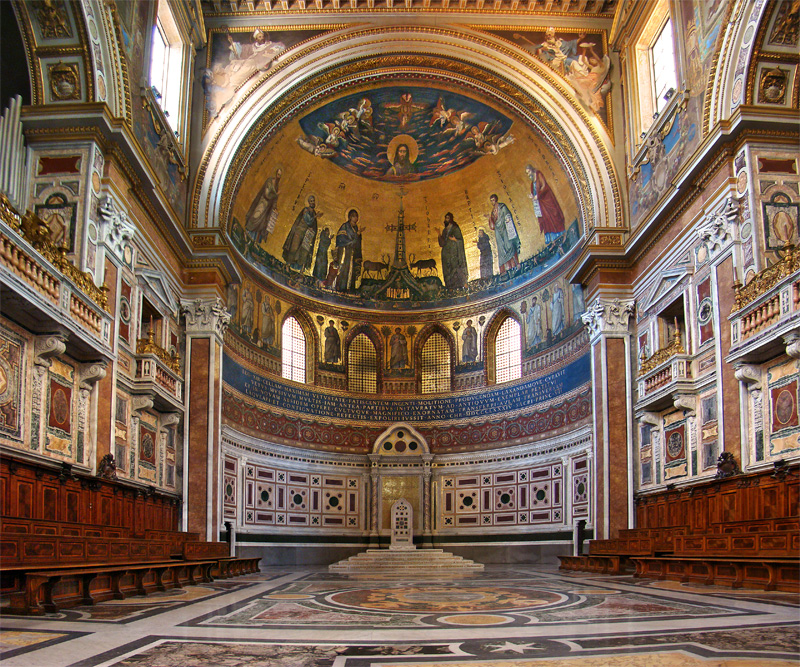
The Papal throne in the Archbasilica of St. John Lateran dates from the 13th century

- 1084 - The city of Rome is attacked by the Normans
- 1108 - The church of San Clemente is in this year rebuilt.
- 1140 - The church of Santa Maria in Trastevere is restored.
- 1200 - The city becomes an independent commune
- 1232 - The cloisters in the Basilica of St. John Lateran are finished.
- 1300 - Pope Boniface VIII proclaims the First Holy Year.
- 1309 - The Papacy is moved to Avignon under Pope Clement V
- 1347 - The patriot and rebel Cola di Rienzo tries to restore the Roman Republic.
- 1348 - As in most of Europe, the Black Death strikes Rome.

== Roman Renaissance ==
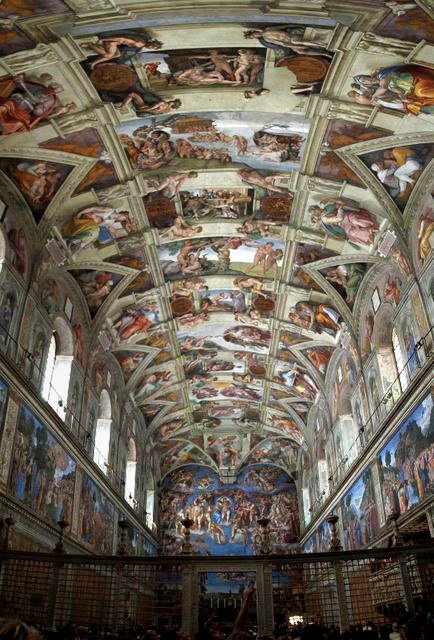
From 1508 to 1512, Michelangelo painted the Ceiling of the Sistine Chapel

- 1377 - The Papacy returns to Rome with Pope Gregory XI.
- 1409 - 1415 - For a short while, the Papacy moves over to Pisa.
- 1417 - The Great Schism of the 14th century is ended by Pope Martin V
- 1444 - Bramante is born.
- 1452 - Old St. Peter's Basilica is demolished and a new one is begun.
- 1475 - Michelangelo Buonarroti is born.
- 1483 - Raphael is born.
- 1486 - The Palazzo della Cancelleria is built.
- 1506 - The first significant works on the New St. Peter's Basilica re begun with Pope Julius II
- 1508 - Michelangelo paints the ceiling of the Sistine Chapel
- 1519 - The frescos of the Villa Farnesina are finally completed.
- 1527 - Troops of Charles V, Holy Roman Emperor attack Rome, looting and ruining the city.
- 1547 - Michelangelo is appointed by Pope Paul III as the main architect of the new St. Peter's Basilica.

== Baroque period ==
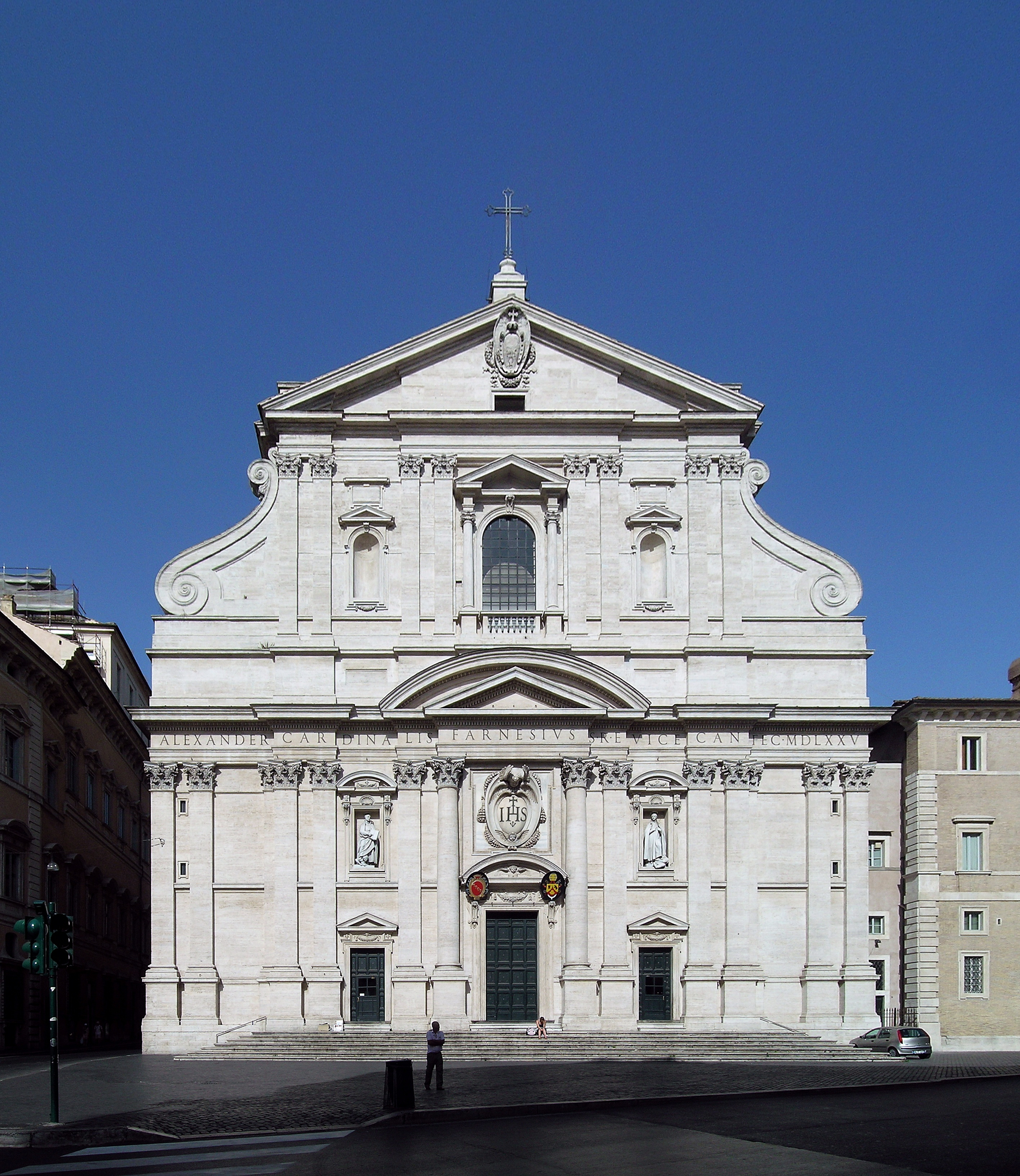
The Church of the Gesù was the first Baroque structure, built in 1568

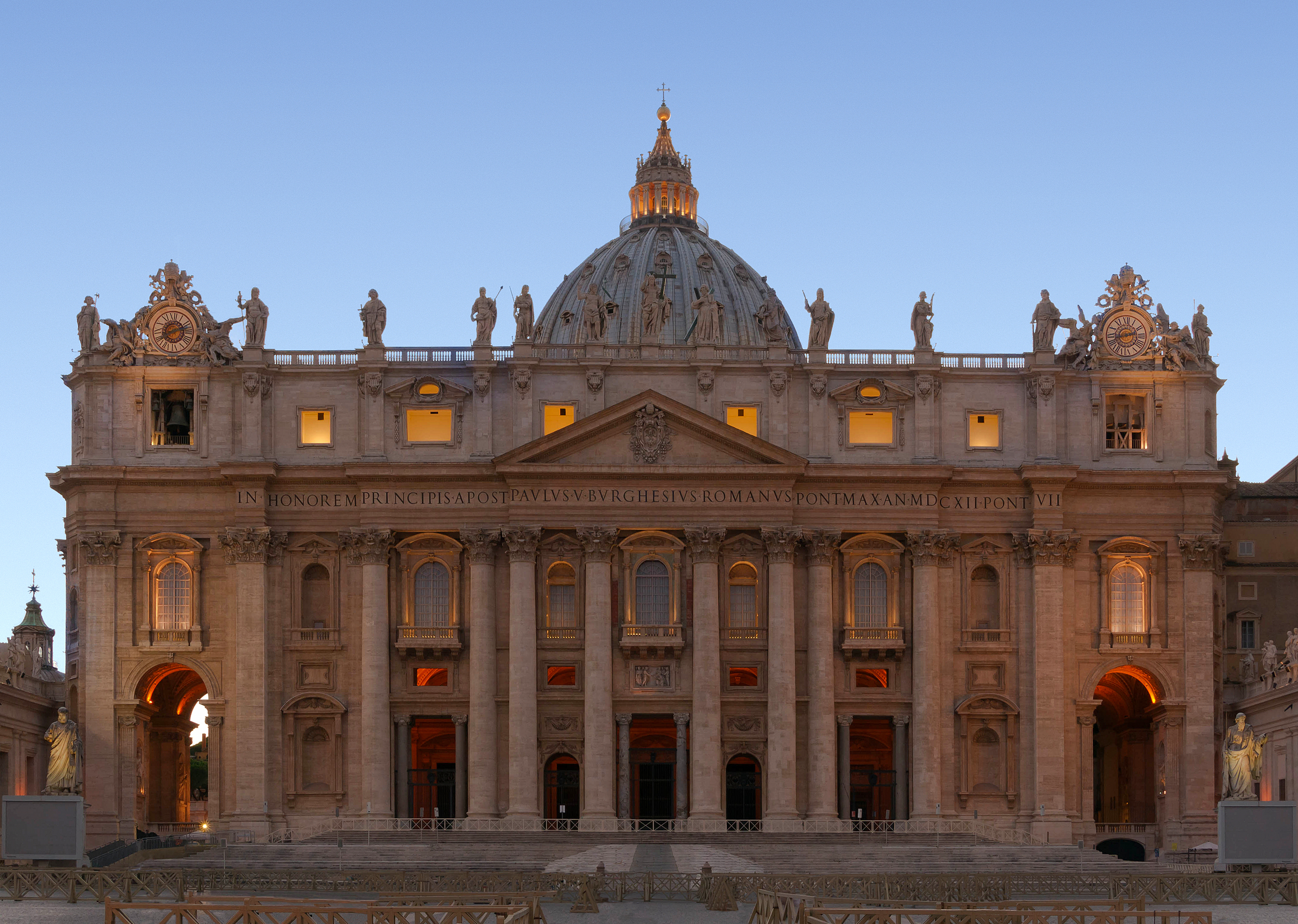
The current St. Peter's Basilica was finished in 1626

- 1568 - The Jesuits build the early Baroque Church of the Gesù.
- 1571 - Caravaggio is born.
- 1585 - Rome's streets are re-planned by Pope Sixtus V.
- 1595 - The frescos in the Palazzo Farnese are begun by Annibale Carracci.
- 1600 - Giordano Bruno (philosopher) is burned at the stake for his heresies.
- 1624 - Apollo and Daphne, the sculpture by Bernini, is made in this year.
- 1626 - Construction of the new St. Peter's Basilica is completed.
- 1633 - Galileo is condemned for heresy.

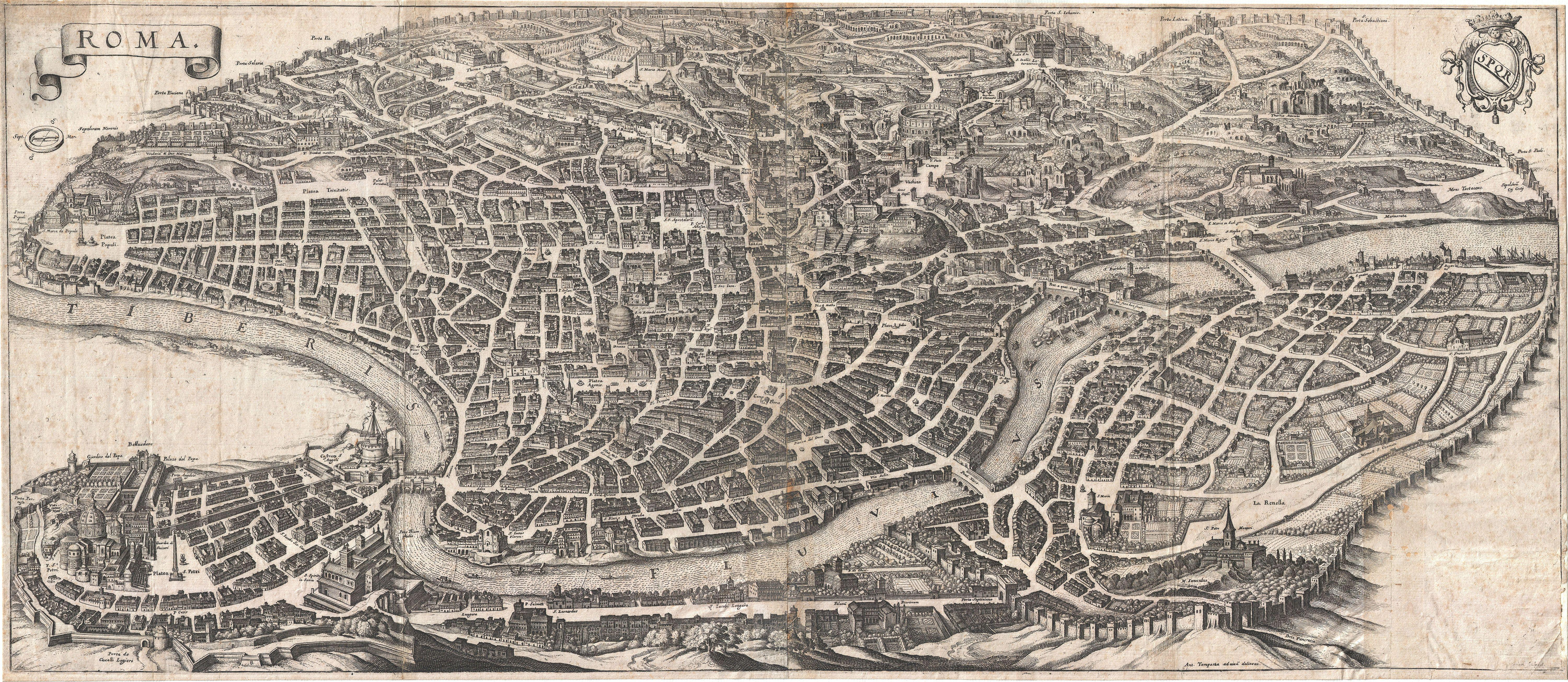
Rome around 1642

- 1651 - Piazza Navona is fully re-designed by Bernini.
- 1653 - Pope Innocent X issues the bull "Cum occasione impressionis libri" condemning heresy of Jansenism.
- 1656 - Bernini's colonnades in St. Peter's Square are begun.
- 1657 - Borromini finishes his work in Sant' Agnese in Agone.
- 1676 - Pope Innocent XI (1676-1689) initiates major reforms; stabilises papal finances; condemn nepotism; upgrades clerical morals; finances Austria's wars against Ottoman Empire to protect Vienna and Hungary. However he fails in efforts to reduce royal control of the Church in France.
- 1694 - The Palazzo di Montecitorio is finished.
- 1732 - Work on the Trevi Fountain begins.
- 1734 - The Palazzo Nuovo is made by Pope Clement XII the world's first public museum.
- 1735 - The Spanish Steps are designed.
- 1751 - The Views of Rome by Piranesi revives interest in Rome's classical ruins.
- 1762 - The Trevi Fountain is completed.
- 1792 - Pope Clement XIII tomb by Canova is completed.
- 1797 - Napoleon Bonaparte captures Rome.
- 1798 - New Roman Republic declared by Napoleon, Pope Pius VI exiled.
- 1799 - Napoleon is driven out of Rome and Italy by the Russians and the Austrians

== 19th century and Risorgimento ==
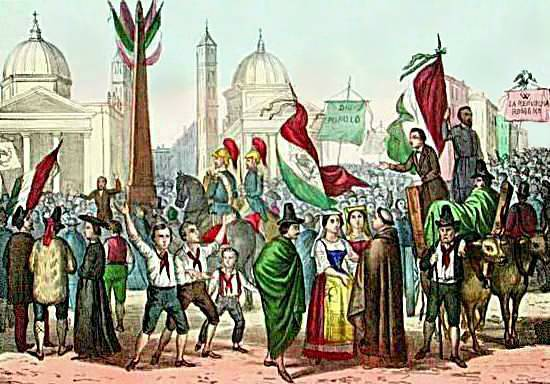
Illustration of the proclamation of the 1849 Roman Republic in the Piazza del Popolo.

- 1800 - 1801 - Napoleon retakes Italy and Rome.

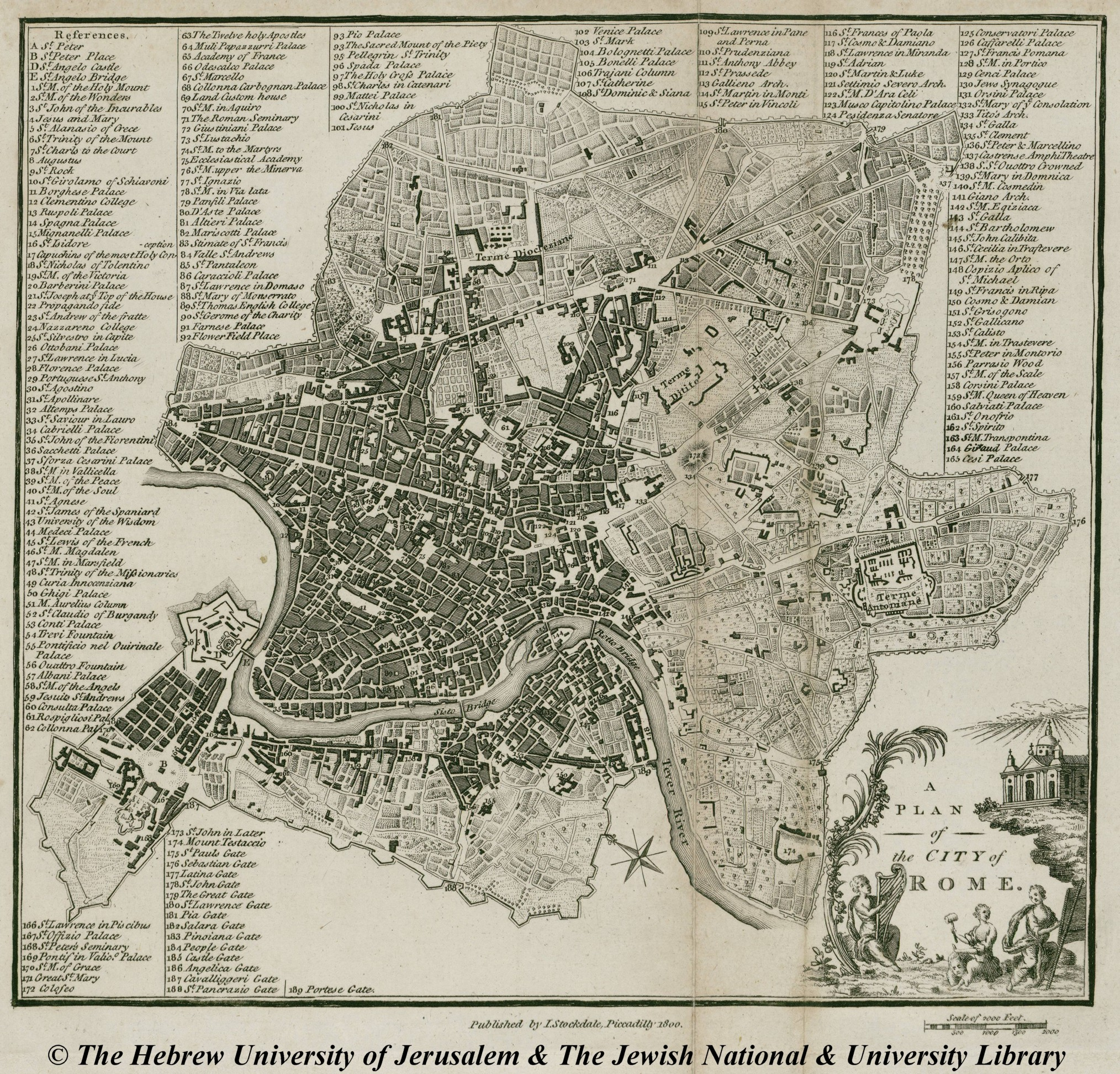
Rome around 1800

- 1816 - Work on the Piazza del Popolo begins.
- 1820 - There are a series of revolts in Rome and the rest of Italy.
- 1821 - The British poet John Keats dies in Rome.
- 1848 - Uprisings in Rome.
- 1849 - Nationalists proclaim an unrecognised Roman Republic. Pope Pius IX is later restored to power in the city, after a French invasion.
- 1860 - Garibaldi and his 1,000 soldiers take Sicily and Naples.
- 1861 - The Kingdom of Italy is founded, with Turin as its capital.
- 1870 - Rome captured by Italy.

== 20th century and modern Rome ==
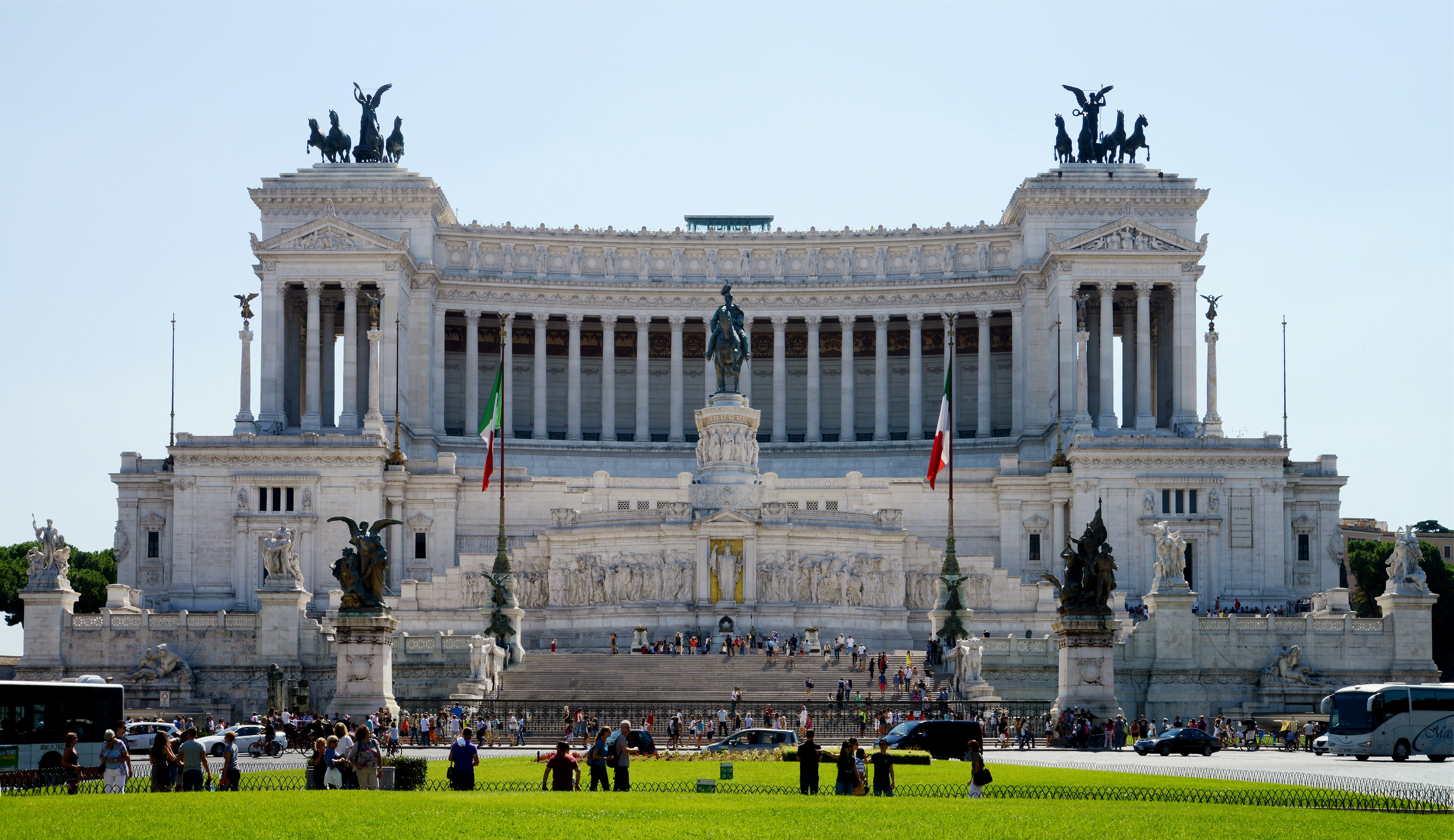
The Altare della Patria was built in honour of King Victor Emmanuel II in 1911

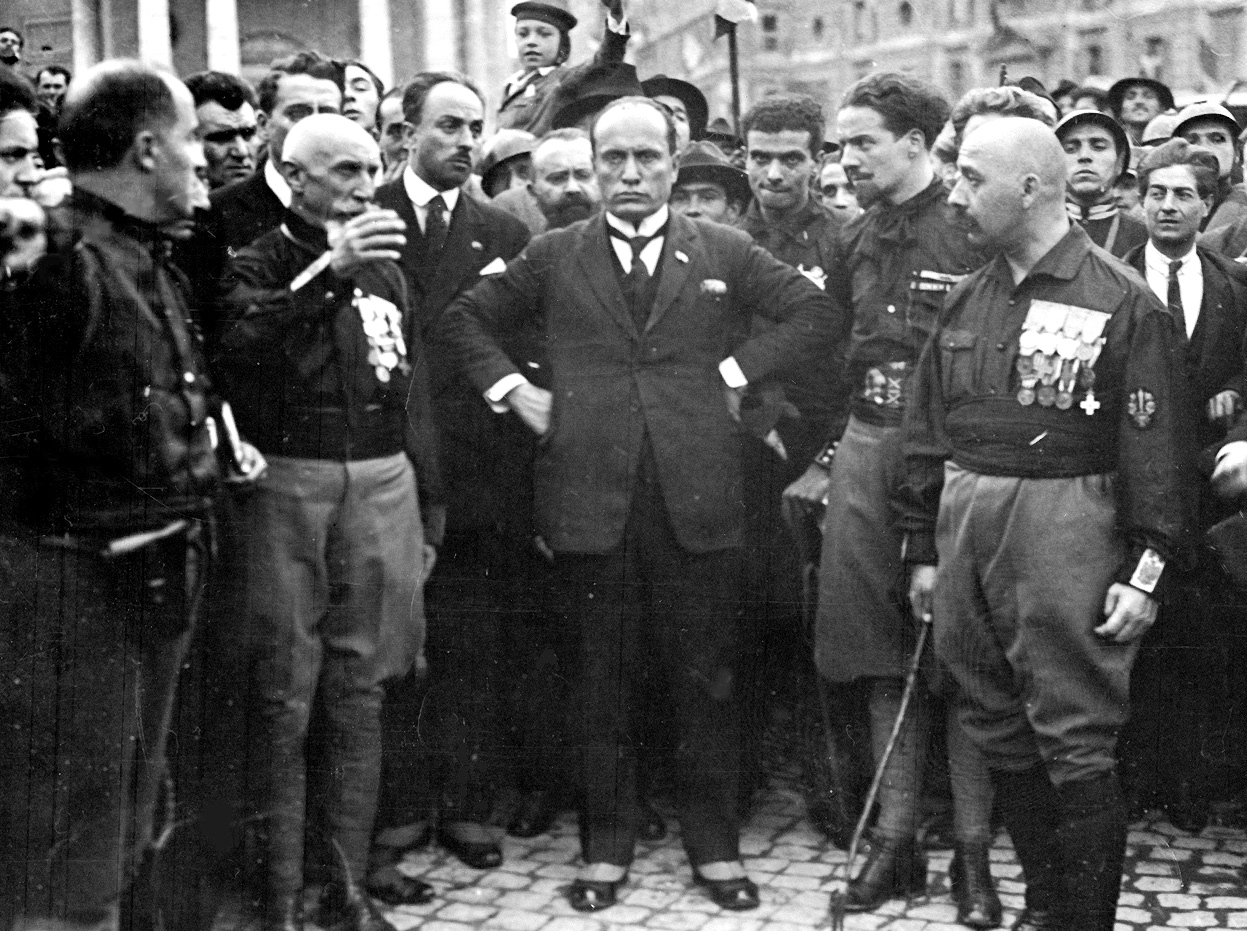
Fascists, led by Benito Mussolini, at the March on Rome in 1922

- 1911 - The Altare della Patria is completed.
- 1916 - Rome Ciampino Airport is inaugurated.
- 1922 - March on Rome by Fascists.
- 1925-40 - Large parts of the historic centre are pulled down and rebuilt by Benito Mussolini.
- 1929 - A separate country within Rome, Vatican City, is created by the Lateran Treaty.
- 1940 - EUR begins, and the nation enters World War II.
- 1943 - Bombing of Rome in World War II begins.
- 1944 - Rome is liberated by the Allied troops from the Germans.
- 1955 - Rome Metro begins operating.
- 1957 - Treaty of Rome
- 1960 - Rome hosts the 1960 Summer Olympics, with great success.
- 1961 - Rome Fiumicino Airport is inaugurated.
- 1962 - Roman Catholic church reforms are brought about with the Second Vatican Council.
- 1978 - Italian prime minister Aldo Moro is kidnapped and later killed by the Brigate Rosse; Pope John Paul I and Pope John Paul II are made popes in this year.
- c.1978 - 1990 - Years of Lead: period of paramilitary violence across Italy.
- 1981 - An assassination attempt on Pope John Paul II is made in St. Peter's Basilica Square.
- 1990 - Rome hosts the 1990 FIFA World Cup Final.
- 1991 - Rome hosts the Eurovision Song Contest 1991.
- 1993 - Francesco Rutelli becomes the first mayor of Rome elected by the citizens.
- 2000 - The city enters the New Millennium, featuring a new Holy Year, or the Jubilee.

== 21st century ==
- 2004 - A new constitution of the European Union is signed in Rome.
- 2005 - Pope John Paul II dies in Rome, and Pope Benedict XVI takes his place.
- 2013 - Benedict XVI resigns and Pope Francis is elected as his successor.
- 2016 - June: Rome municipal election, 2016 held.
- 2022 - Benedict XVI dies in Rome.
- 2025 - Pope Francis dies in Rome, and Pope Leo XIV takes his place.

== See also ==
Other cities in the macroregion of Central Italy:^{(it)}

- Timeline of Ancona, Marche region
- Timeline of Arezzo, Tuscany region
- Timeline of Florence, Tuscany
- Timeline of Grosseto, Tuscany
- Timeline of Livorno, Tuscany
- Timeline of Lucca, Tuscany
- Timeline of Perugia, Umbria region
- Timeline of Pisa, Tuscany
- Timeline of Pistoia, Tuscany
- Timeline of Prato, Tuscany
- Timeline of Siena, Tuscany
