= Franco Antonio Fanucchi =

Italian politician

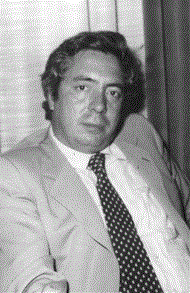

President of the Province of Lucca
- In office 27 August 1990 – 18 February 1992
- Preceded by: Piero Leonardo Andreucci
- Succeeded by: Piero Baccelli

Mayor of Lucca
- In office 1 December 1988 – 18 July 1990
- Preceded by: Mauro Favilla
- Succeeded by: Arturo Pacini
- In office 28 November 1984 – 31 July 1985
- Preceded by: Mauro Favilla
- Succeeded by: Piero Baccelli

Member of the Regional Council of Tuscany
- In office June 1980 – 5 December 1984
- Succeeded by: Ferdinando Soldati

Personal details
- Born: 29 January 1942 Lucca, Kingdom of Italy
- Died: 5 July 1996 (aged 54) Lucca, Italy
- Party: Christian Democracy
- Occupation: Engineer, executive

Franco Antonio Fanucchi (29 January 1942 – 5 July 1996) was an Italian politician of the Christian Democracy party.

Fanucchi graduated in engineering and worked as an industrial executive. He served on the Lucca City Council from 1970 to 1975 and was a municipal assessor from 1975 to 1980. In the 1980 Tuscan election, he was elected to the Regional Council of Tuscany with 9,766 votes, serving until his resignation in November 1984. He served twice as mayor of Lucca, first from 1984 to 1985 and again from 1988 to 1990. From 1990 to 1992, Fanucchi was president of the Province of Lucca.

He also served for many years as president of the Lucca Chamber of Commerce and of Unioncamere Toscana. He died in 1996 at the age of 54.
