= Alessandro Tambellini =

Italian politician

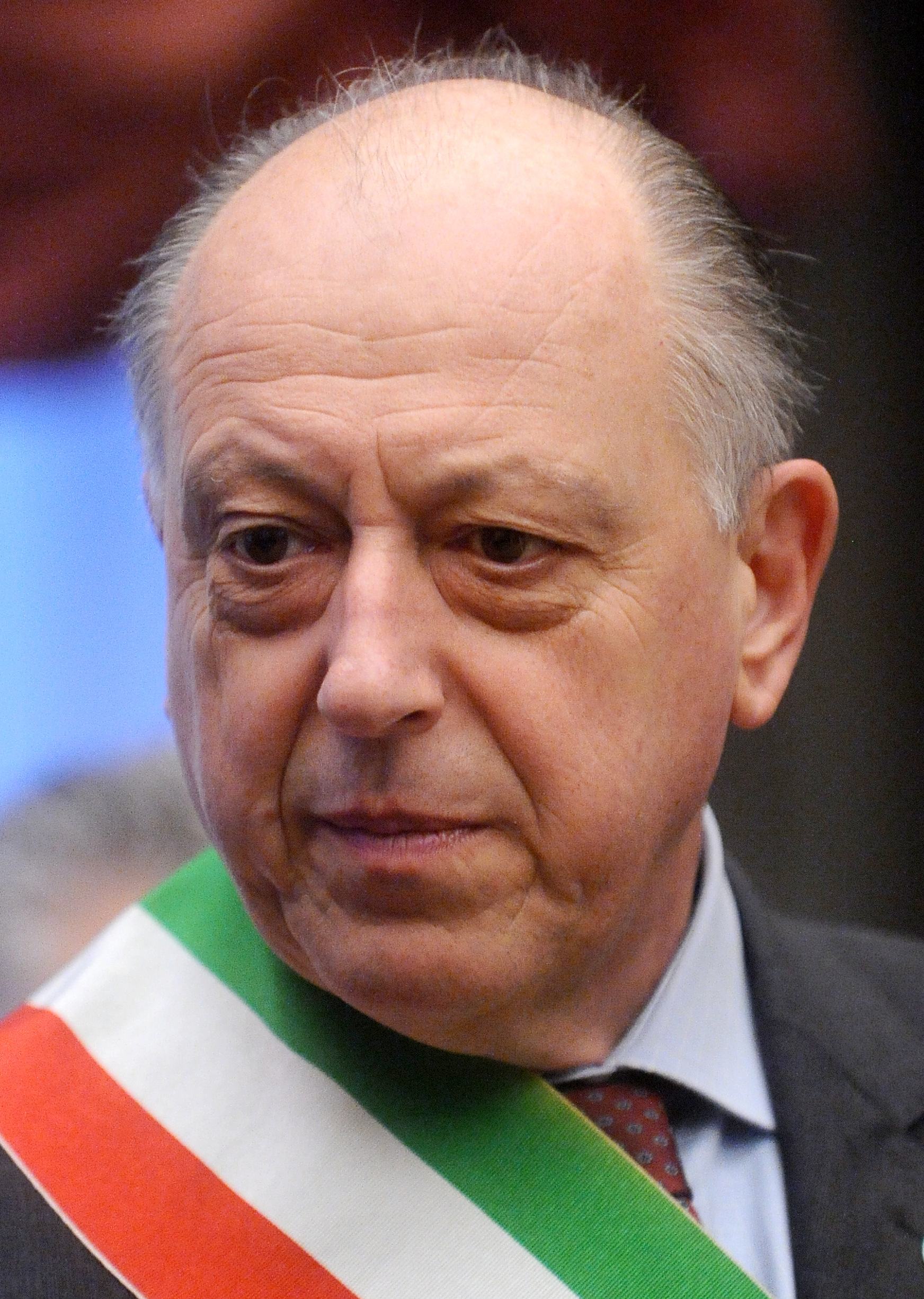

Mayor of Lucca
- In office 22 May 2012 – 29 June 2022
- Preceded by: Mauro Favilla
- Succeeded by: Mario Pardini

Personal details
- Born: 30 April 1955 (age 70) Lucca, Italy
- Party: Democratic Party
- Occupation: Politician; Teacher
- Website: alessandrotambellini.it

Alessandro Tambellini (born 30 April 1955) is an Italian politician.

Tambellini was born in Lucca, Italy. He is married and has three children.

He is member of the Democratic Party. Tambellini was elected Mayor of Lucca on 20 May 2012 and re-confirmed for the second term on 25 June 2017.

On 10 March 2020 he announced he had tested positive for SARS-CoV-2.
