= Zoo di Pistoia =

Zoo and amusement park in Tuscany, Italy

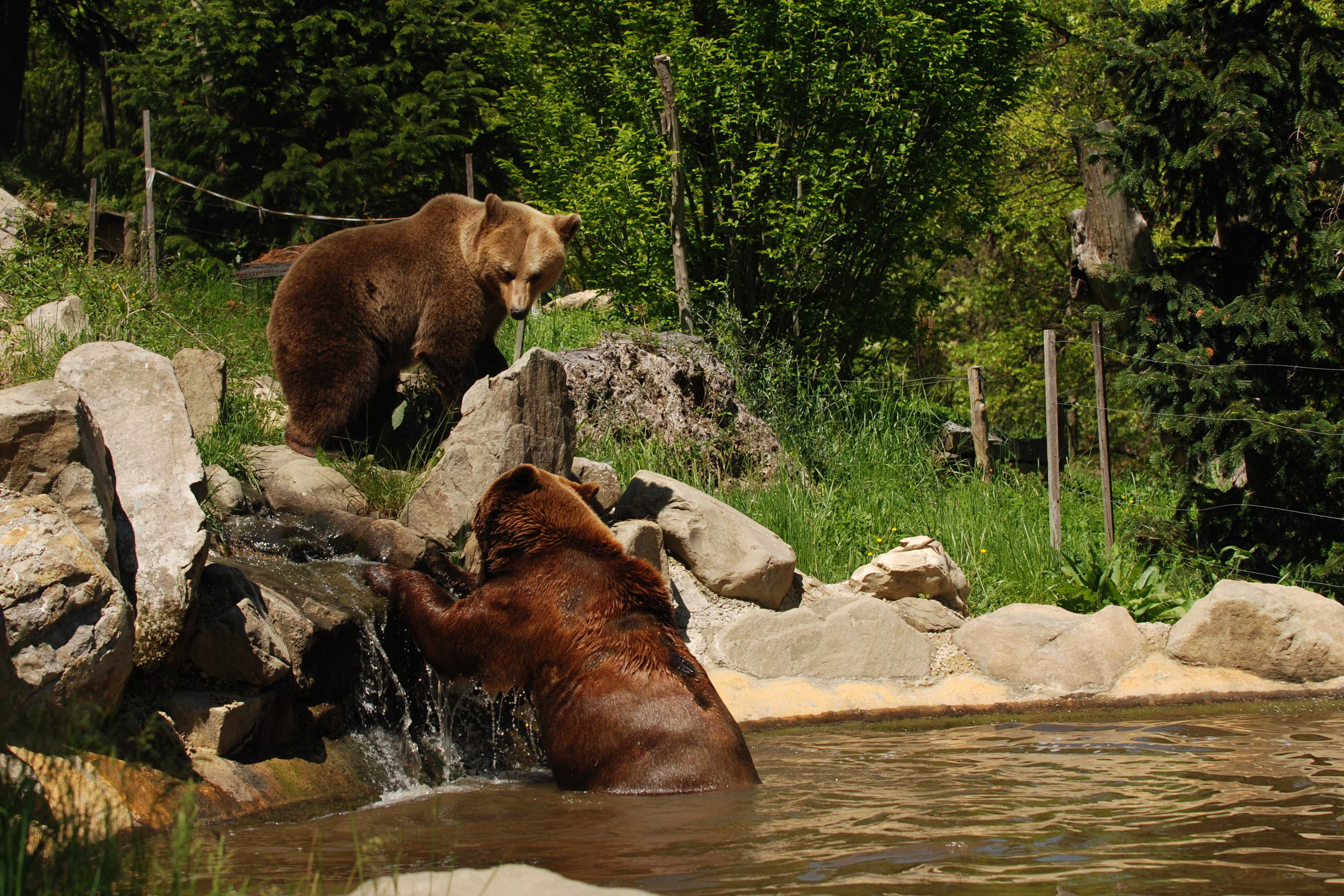
- Brown bears
- Interactive map of Zoo di Pistoia
- Type: Zoo, Amusement park
- Location: Pistoia, Italy
- Coordinates: 43.92962147°N 10.86565342°E
- Area: 75.000 m^{2} (807.29 sq ft)
- Created: 1970
- Status: Open all year

Zoo di Pistoia is a Zoo and Amusement park in Pistoia, Tuscany, Italy, created in 1970 with an area of 75,000 square metres.
