= Palazzo Bracciolini, Pistoia =

Building in Italy

Coordinates: 43°56′01″N 10°55′01″E

The Palazzo Bracciolini is a Neoclassic-style palace located facing the Piazza del Duomo in central Pistoia, region of Tuscany, Italy. The palace, which once served as private home for the aristocratic family, has offices, retail cafe, and government offices.

== Description ==
The palace was commissioned by Baron Bracciolini in 1786 from the architect Calliani. Nearby is the Palazzo Bracciolini delle Api.
