= Ducal Palace, Lucca =

Coordinates: 43°50′29.14″N 10°30′7.32″E

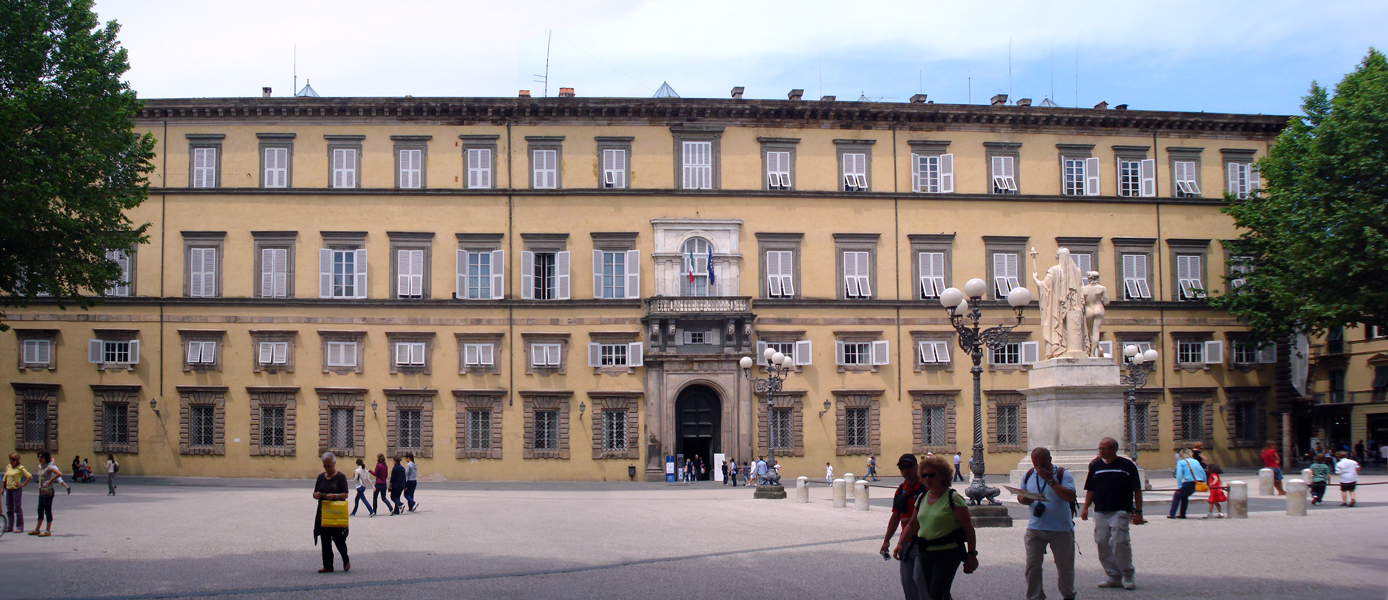
Palazzo Ducale.

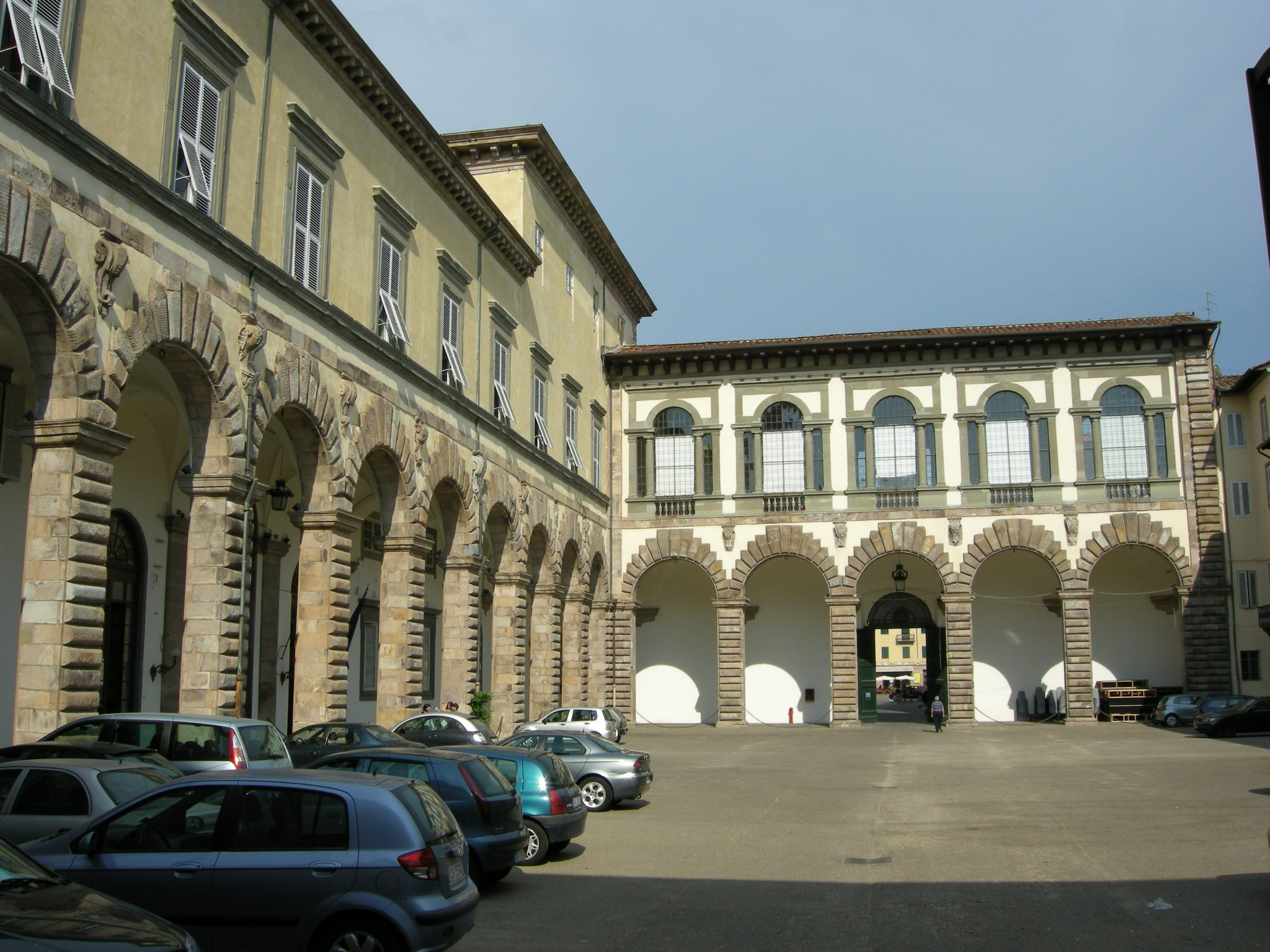
Ammannati's loggia.

The Ducal Palace (Italian: Palazzo Ducale) is a palace in Lucca, Tuscany, central Italy.

== History ==
The palace is located on the site of the Fortezza Augustan, the residence of condottiero Castruccio Castracani, where also was his palace, perhaps designed by Giotto. The large complex, which occupied a fifth of the city, was destroyed by the populace in 1370. The fortress was restored and used as residence by Paolo Guinigi in 1401; after his fall in 1429 this was again partially dismantled and later became the Palazzo Pubblico ("Public Palace").

After a period as the residence of Duchess Elisa Baciocchi, it was the seat of the Lucchese state government until the Unification of Italy in 1861, when it was acquired by the province of Lucca.

== Description ==
The palace is of large size and owes its current appearance to Bartolomeo Ammannati's restoration in 1578 (from the left side to the central portal). The right wing was added only in 1728 by Francesco Pini, a pupil of Filippo Juvarra. In the early 19th century it was further enriched by the ducal architect Lorenzo Nottolini.

The palace includes a central court, which is unfinished. It has a double portico with pillars and, in the center, a statue of the Lucchese lawyer Francesco Carrara, work by Augusto Passaglia. On the left is another unfinished court, known as Cortile degli Svizzeri, referring to the corps of Swiss Guard in service of the Republic of Lucca, also designed by Ammannati and characterized by the use of rustication.

In the past the interior hall, accessed through a monumental stair by Nottolini, housed the National Gallery of Lucca, moved to Villa Guinigi in 1977. The staircase ends with a gallery of statues. The Hall of the General Council of the Republic has a Flemish painting and a fresco of the Lucchese Freedom. Above the Loggia delle Guardie is the Ammannati Loggia, decorated with grotesques and stucco. The Staffieri Hall has frescoes by Luigi Ademollo.

== Sources ==
- "Toscana". Guida d'Italia. Milan: Touring Club Italiano. 2003.
