= List of mayors of Lucca =

Mayor of Lucca
- Sindaco di Lucca
- Incumbent; Mario Pardini since 29 June 2022
- Appointer: Popular election
- Term length: 5 years, renewable once
- Inaugural holder: Demetrio Del Prete
- Formation: 1865
- Website: Official website

The Mayor of Lucca is an elected politician who, along with the City Council, is accountable for the strategic government of Lucca in Tuscany, Italy.

The current mayor is Mario Pardini, a right-wing independent, who took office on 29 June 2022.

== Overview ==
According to the Italian Constitution, the mayor of Lucca is member of the City Council.

The mayor is elected by the population of Lucca, who also elect the members of the City Council, controlling the mayor's policy guidelines and is able to enforce his resignation by a motion of no confidence. The mayor is entitled to appoint and dismiss the members of his government.

Since 1994, the mayor has been elected directly by Lucca's electorate. In all mayoral elections in Italy in cities with a population higher than 15,000 the voters express a direct choice for the mayor or an indirect choice voting for the party of the candidate's coalition. If no candidate receives at least 50% of votes, the top two candidates go to a second round two weeks later. The election of the city council is based on a direct choice for the candidate with a preference vote: the candidate with the majority of the preferences is elected. The number of the seats for each party is determined proportionally.

== Kingdom of Italy (1861–1946) ==
In 1865, the Kingdom of Italy created the office of Mayor of Lucca (Sindaco di Lucca), appointed by the King himself. From 1892 to 1926, the mayor was elected by the city council. In 1926, the Fascist dictatorship abolished mayors and city councils, replacing them with an authoritarian Podestà chosen by the National Fascist Party. The office of mayor was restored in 1944 during the Allied occupation.

	Mayor	Term start	Term end	Party
–	Paolo Sinibaldi	1859	1863	
–	Basilio Gianni	1864	1865	
1	Demetrio Del Prete	1865	1870	
2	Cesare Giorgetti	1871	1878	
3	Achille Pucci	1883	1888	
4	Enrico Del Carlo	1889	1896	
5	Carlo Pierantoni	1896	1899	
6	Giovanni Battista Carrara	1899	1900	
7	Giulio Lippi	1900	1903	
8	Massimo Del Carlo	1903	1906	
9	Lelio Chicca	1906	1910	
10	Giulio Cesare Ballerini	1910	1911	
(8)	Massimo Del Carlo	1912	1919	
11	Umberto Teghini	1919	1920	
12	Pietro Pfanner	1920	1922	
13	Lorenzo Del Prete	1922	1923	
14	Mario Guidi	1923	1926	PNF
Fascist Podestà (1926–1944)
1	Mario Guidi	1926	1927	PNF
2	Lorenzo Grossi	1927	1929	PNF
3	Guido Politi	1930	1933	PNF
4	Pietro Minutoli Tegrimi	1935	1939	PNF
5	Domenico Giannini	1944	1944	PNF
Allied occupation (1944–1946)
15	Gino Baldassarri	1944	1946	PCI

== Italian Republic (since 1946) ==
=== City Council election (1946–1994) ===
From 1946 to 1994, the mayor of Lucca was elected by the city's council.

	Mayor	Term start	Term end	Party
1	Ferdinando Martini	24 April 1946	23 March 1948	DC
2	Umberto Giannini	23 March 1948	30 June 1951	DC
3	Tito Giovanni Marchetti	30 June 1951	26 November 1960	DC
4	Italico Baccelli	27 November 1960	16 January 1965	DC
5	Giovanni Martinelli	17 January 1965	18 December 1972	DC
6	Mauro Favilla	19 December 1972	27 November 1984	DC
7	Franco Antonio Fanucchi	28 November 1984	31 July 1985	DC
8	Piero Baccelli	31 July 1985	30 March 1988	DC
(6)	Mauro Favilla	30 March 1988	1 December 1988	DC
(7)	Franco Antonio Fanucchi	1 December 1988	18 July 1990	DC
9	Arturo Pacini	9 August 1990	19 October 1993	DC
Special Prefectural Commissioner tenure (19 October 1993 – 12 July 1994)

=== Direct election (since 1994) ===
Since 1994, under provisions of new local administration law, the mayor of Lucca is chosen by direct election, originally every four, then every five years.

	Mayor	Term start	Term end	Party	Coalition	Election
10	Giulio Lazzarini	12 July 1994	8 June 1998	CS	PDS • PPI	1994
11	Pietro Fazzi	8 June 1998	28 May 2002	FI	FI • AN • CCD	1998
11	Pietro Fazzi	28 May 2002	6 June 2006 (Note: Resigned.)	FI	FI • AN • UDC	2002
Special Prefectural Commissioner tenure (6 June 2006 – 12 June 2007)
12	Mauro Favilla	12 June 2007	22 May 2012	PdL	PdL • UDC	2007
13	Alessandro Tambellini	22 May 2012	26 June 2017	PD	PD • IdV • SEL • FdS	2012
13	Alessandro Tambellini	26 June 2017	29 June 2022	PD	PD • SI	2017
14	Mario Pardini	29 June 2022	Incumbent	Ind	FdI • FI • Lega • UDC	2022

== Bibliography ==
- Luca Baldissara; Gian Luca Fruci, eds. (2016). «I savj del palazzo Santini». Storia del Consiglio comunale di Lucca (1865-2015). Lucca: Pacini Fazzi.
- "Lucca festeggia i 150 anni del consiglio". Il Tirreno. 6 July 2015.
- "Da Demetrio Del Prete a Tambellini. Ecco i nomi dei 32 primi cittadini". Il Tirreno. 6 July 2015.
