= Mauro Favilla =

Italian politician (1934–2021)

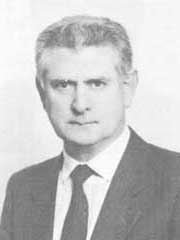
Mauro Favilla

Mauro Favilla (5 January 1934 – 16 March 2021) was an Italian politician.

He served as Senator (1987–1996) and Mayor of Lucca for five terms (1972–1984, 1988, 2007–2012).

He died of COVID-19.

== Biography ==
He died on March 16, 2021, in Lucca at the age of 87, after contracting COVID-19, which had exacerbated some pre-existing medical conditions.
