= Timeline of Perugia =

The following is a timeline of the history of the city of Perugia in the Umbria region of Italy.

== Prior to 17th century ==
- 310 BCE - Romans in power; settlement named "Perusia."
- 3rd century BCE - Etruscan walls built.
- 216 and 205 BCE - Assisted Rome in the Hannibalic war.
- 90 BCE - Town "received Roman citizenship."
- 40 BCE - Perusia sacked during the Perusine War.
- 5th century CE - Roman Catholic diocese of Perugia established.
- 548 CE - Perugia besieged by forces of Ostrogoth Totila during the Gothic War (535–554).
- 554 CE - Duchy of Perugia founded (under the Byzantine Praetorian Prefect of Italy)
- 584 CE - Duchy placed under the Exarchate of Ravenna
- 749 CE - Duchy invaded by the Lombard king Ratchis; Perugia besieged
- 751 CE - Exarchate of Ravenna collapses following invasion by the Lombards under king Aistulf and the death of the last exarch Eutychius
- c. 752 CE - de facto under papal control
- 10th century - Benedictine San Pietro abbey founded.
- 1139 - Perugia "recorded as a free comune."
- 1205 - Chiesa di San Costanzo (Perugia) (church) rebuilt.
- 1216 - Papal election, 1216 held at Perugia.
- 1250 - Chiesa di San Francesco al Prato (church) built (approximate date).
- 1264 - Papal election, 1264–65 held at Perugia.
- 1278 - Fontana Maggiore (fountain) erected in the Piazza Maggiore.
- 1285 - Papal election, 1285 held at Perugia.
- 1293 - Palazzo del Popolo construction begins.
- 1294 - Papal election, 1292–94 held at Perugia.
- 1304
  - Papal conclave, 1304–05 held at Perugia.
  - San Domenico church construction begins.
- 1308 - University of Perugia established.
- 1345 - Perugia Cathedral construction begins.
- 1348 - Plague.
- 1390 - Collegio della Mercanzia (merchants' guild office) built in the Palazzo dei Priori.
- 1416 - Braccio da Montone in power.
- 1424 - Baglioni (family) in power.
- 1453 - Università Vecchia built on the Piazza del Sopramuro.
- 1457 - Collegio del Cambio (exchange guild office) built in the Palazzo dei Priori.
- 1461 - Oratorio di San Bernardino (Perugia) facade constructed.
- 1475 - Printing press in operation.
- 1480 - Porta di San Pietro (Perugia) (gate) built.
- 1490 - Perugia Cathedral completed.
- 1534 - Perugia "deprived of its privileges."
- 1540
  - Salt War (1540).
  - Porta Marzia (gate) dismantled.
- 1543 - Rocca Paolina (fort) built.
- 1548 - Loggia dell'Angelo della Pace built.
- 1561 - Accademia degli Insensati founded.
- 1573
  - Accademia del Disegno founded.
  - Vincenzo Danti appointed city architect.
- 1587 - Perugia Cathedral consecrated.

== 17th-19th centuries ==
- 1623 - Biblioteca Augusta (library) opens.
- 1665 - Chiesa di San Filippo Neri (Perugia) (church) built.
- 1720 - Orto Botanico dell'Università di Perugia (garden) established.
- 1723 - Teatro del Pavone (theatre) opens.
- 1758 - Palazzo Antinori built.
- 1762 - Montemorcino monastery built.
- 1781 - Teatro Morlacchi (theatre) opens.
- 1797 - Perugia was occupied by the French.
- 1798 - Perugia becomes part of the Trasimène (1798) department of France.
- 1832 - Earthquake.^{(it)}
- 1838 - Earthquake.^{(it)}
- 1840 - Ancient Hypogeum of the Volumnus family rediscovered near Perugia.
- 1849
  - Austrians in power.
  - Cimitero monumentale di Perugia (cemetery) established.
- 1854 - Earthquake.
- 1859 - 20 June: 1859 Perugia uprising.
- 1860
  - Perugia becomes part of the Kingdom of Italy.
  - Pasticceria Sandri in business.
- 1863 - Pinacoteca Vannucci (museum) established.
- 1866 - Perugia railway station opens.
- 1891 - Teatro Turreno (theatre) opens.
- 1899 - Tram begins operating.

== 20th century ==
- 1905 - A.C. Perugia (football club) formed.
- 1911 - Population: 65,805.
- 1943 - Perugia trollebus begins operating.
- 1944 - 20 June: Allied forces enter city.
- 1961 - Perugia-Assisi Peace March begins.
- 1974 - Istituto per la storia dell'Umbria contemporanea (history society) formed.
- 1975 - Stadio Renato Curi (stadium) opens.
- 1983 - Corriere dell'Umbria newspaper begins publication.
- 1984 - 29 April: Umbria earthquake of 1984.

== 21st century ==
- 2007 - 1 November: Murder of Meredith Kercher.
- 2008 - MiniMetro automated people mover system begins operating.
- 2011 - Perugia San Francesco d'Assisi – Umbria International Airport terminal built.
- 2013 - Population: 162,986.
- 2014 - Perugia local election held; Andrea Romizi becomes mayor.

== See also ==
- History of Perugia
- Perusia, city of ancient Etruria
- List of mayors of Perugia
- List of bishops of Perugia
- State Archives of Perugia (state archives)
- Umbria history (it)

Other cities in the macroregion of Central Italy:^{(it)}

- Timeline of Ancona, Marche region
- Timeline of Arezzo, Tuscany region
- Timeline of Florence, Tuscany
- Timeline of Grosseto, Tuscany
- Timeline of Livorno, Tuscany
- Timeline of Lucca, Tuscany
- Timeline of Pisa, Tuscany
- Timeline of Pistoia, Tuscany
- Timeline of Prato, Tuscany
- Timeline of Rome, Lazio region
- Timeline of Siena, Tuscany

== Bibliography ==
=== in English ===
- William Smith, ed. (1872) [1854]. "Perusia". Dictionary of Greek and Roman Geography. London: John Murray. hdl:2027/hvd.ah5cur.
- Margaret Symonds; Lina Duff Gordon (1898). Story of Perugia. Mediaeval towns. London: J. M. Dent. hdl:2027/uc2.ark:/13960/t6833zg6v.
- "Perugia", Central Italy and Rome (15th ed.), Leipzig: Karl Baedeker, 1909
- Ashby, Thomas (1910). "Perugia" . Encyclopædia Britannica. Vol. 21 (11th ed.). pp. 278–279.
- William Heywood (1910). History of Perugia. The states of Italy. R. Langton Douglas, ed. New York: G. P. Putnam's Sons.
- Benjamin Vincent (1910), "Perugia", Haydn's Dictionary of Dates (25th ed.), London: Ward, Lock & Co., hdl:2027/uc2.ark:/13960/t41r6xh8t
- Roy Domenico (2002). "Umbria: Perugia". Regions of Italy: a Reference Guide to History and Culture. Greenwood. pp. 350+. ISBN 0313307334.
- Christopher Kleinhenz, ed. (2004). "Perugia". Medieval Italy: an Encyclopedia. Routledge. ISBN 0415939291.

=== in Italian ===
- Cesare Crispolti (1658). Perugia augusta descritta (in Italian). ISBN 9788827122273.
- Pellini (1664). Dell'historia di Perugia (in Italian). Venice.
- Baldassarre Orsini [in Italian] (1784). Guida al forestiere per l'augusta città di Perugia (in Italian). Presso il Costantini.
- Serafino Siepi (1822). Descrizione topologico-istorica della città di Perugia (in Italian). Gdalla tipografia Garbinesi e Santucci.
- Giovan Battista Rossi Scotti (1867). Guida di Perugia (in Italian) (2nd ed.). V. Santucci.
- Luigi Bonazzi. Storia di Perugia (in Italian). Tip. di V. Santucci. 1875-1879. 2 volumes: (1) to 1495, (2) 1495-1860.
- "Perugia", Nuova Enciclopedia Italiana (in Italian), vol. 17 (6th ed.), Unione tipografico-editrice torinese, 1884, hdl:2027/nnc1.cu08476845
- Ariodante Fabretti (ed.). Cronache della cittá di Perugia (in Italian). Turin. 1887-1892 (4 vols.)
- Guida di Perugia e pianta della città (in Italian) (2nd ed.). Perugia: Tilli. 1895.
- Raniero Gigliarelli [in Italian] (1907). Perugia antica e Perugia moderna: indicazioni storico-topographiche (in Italian). Perugia: Unione Tipografica Cooperativa-Editrice.
