= Domenico Bruschi =

Italian painter

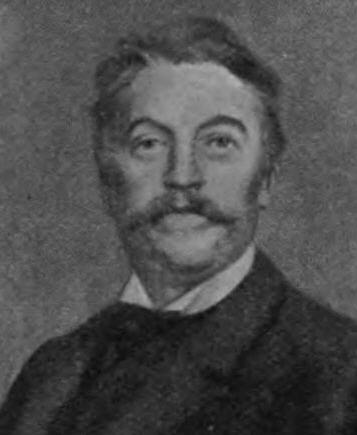
Domenico Bruschi, Larousse mensuel illustré

Domenico Bruschi (13 June 1840 – 19 October 1910) was an Italian painter and educator. Bruschi also designed tapestries, Renaissance revival wooden furniture, sculptures in stucco and stained glass windows. Bruschi served as the chair of Ornamentor at the Institute of Fine Arts in Rome, was made an official Academician of the Accademia di San Luca, and named Commandatore for his excellence in painting.

== Life and work ==
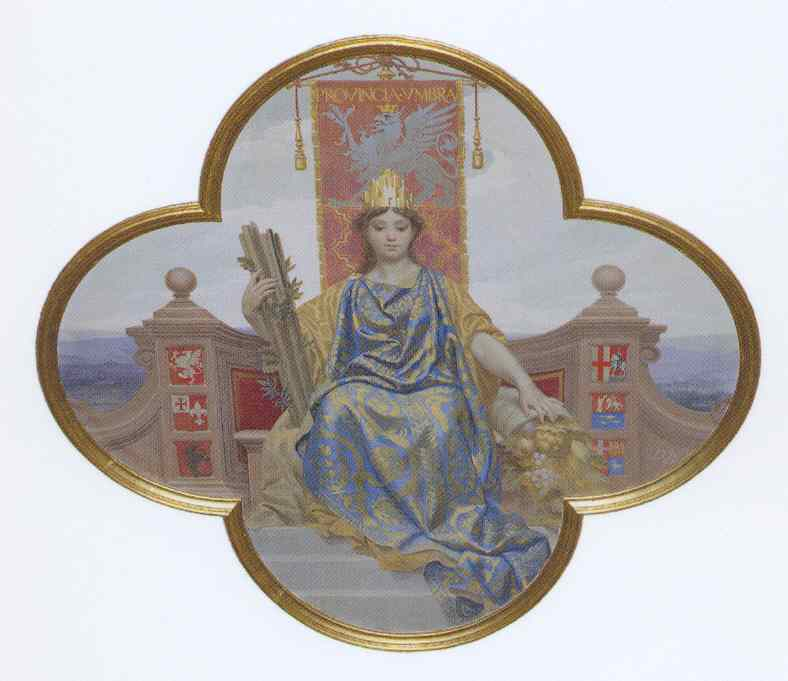
Personification of Umbria in Palazzo of the Prefecture in Perugia

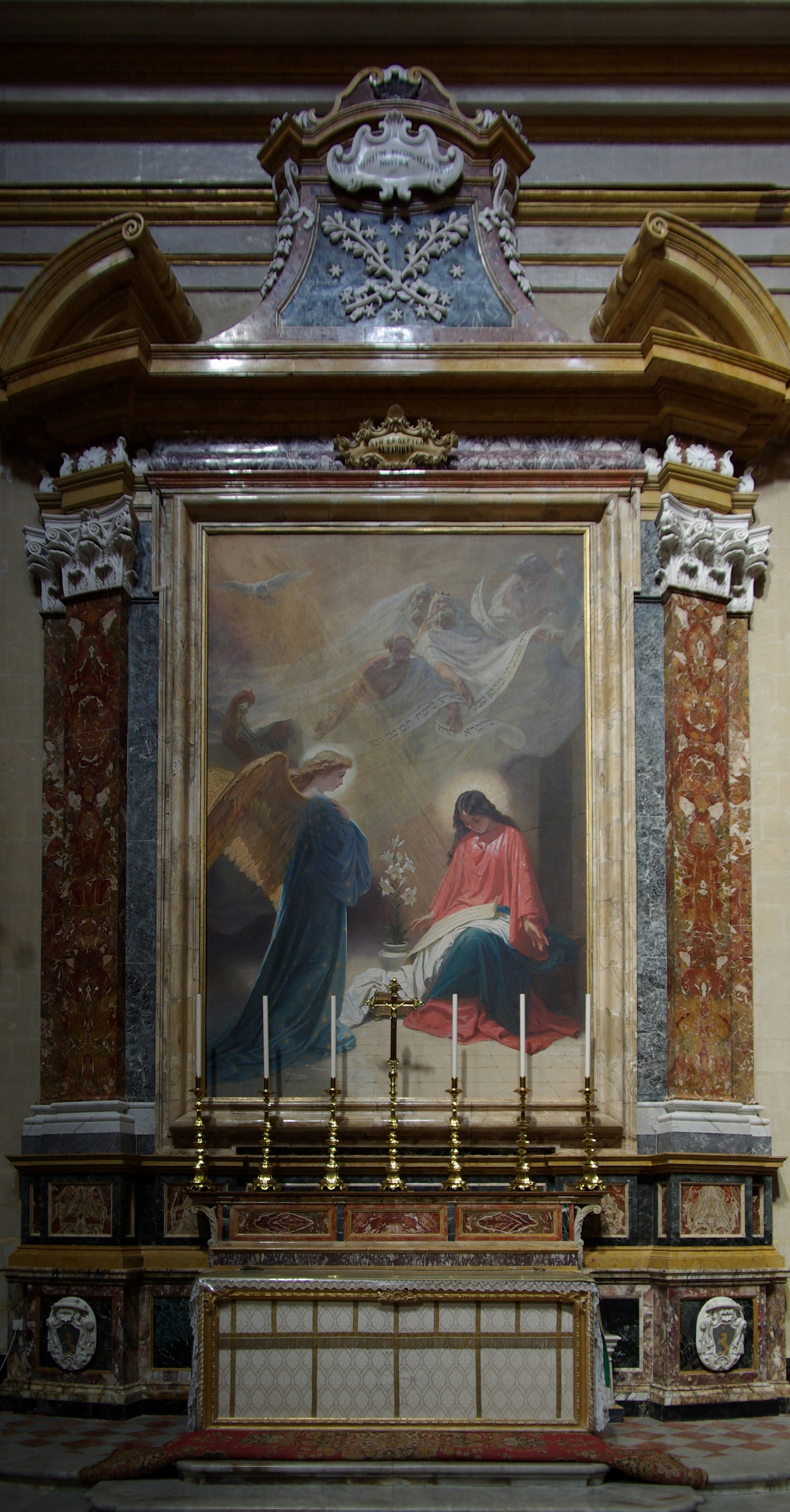
Annunciation (1886), St. Paul's Cathedral, Mdina, Malta

Domenico Bruschi was born in Perugia, Italy, on 13 June 1840, the son of Anna Monti and Carlo Bruschi. He was a pupil of Silvestro Valeri at Accademia di Belle Arti di Perugia, and where in 1857, he painted the chapel of St. Joseph in the church of St. Peter. From the city of Perugia Bruschi was awarded the Pensionato Perugino which encouraged him to travel to Venice and to study in Florence. With these funds he also studied for some time under Tommaso Minardi and Nicola Consoni.

He became famous after his frescoes on the halls of the provincial council's palace. The frescoes were allegorical scenes alluding to the glory of Perugia. In 1859, he travelled to Florence to work in the studio of Bandinelli. Among his works was the decoration of the Chapel of San Giuseppe at San Pietro dei Cassinensi (1858) in Perugia. Also in 1859 he participated by his father's side in the liberation of Perugia from under Papal rule. In 1866 he volunteered in Trentino with the Garibaldini forces. In 1869, he frescoed the Chapel of the Rosary in San Domenico, Perugia, with depictions of San Stefano, Beati Nicolò e Tomassello, and Pope Benedict XI.

He traveled in 1862 to Scotland to paint for various members of the aristocracy. Bruschi and Giovanni Costa, called Nino, met and became close friends in 1870 and, from this time, the younger Bruschi remained devoted to Costa's theories. Through trips to London and Paris, and after his early Macchiaioli theories, Costa concluded that a national art could be properly achieved only by looking to the Renaissance. Costa even met Frederic Leighton in the Cafe Greco in 1853 and continued a lasting friendship. Costa later organized reforming groups such as the Circolo degli Artisti Italiani in 1879 (for which Bruschi served as Secretary), the aim of which was to, "embrace and organize our national artists, and to give life and dignity to Italian art".

Three years later, in 1882, Costa founded the Scuola Etrusca in response to the success of a show held at the Grosvenor Gallery in London. This group also included Bruschi who, with Costa and Leighton, had spent their summers in Umbria throughout the 1870s. Costa's final group, In Arte Libertas was formed in 1885 and its exhibitions included such celebrated artists as Arnold Böcklin, Edward Burne-Jones, Anselm Feuerbach, Puvis de Chavannes and Dante Gabriel Rossetti. In this way Bruschi would have known many of these artists from his previous trips abroad. Returning to Perugia, he completed the main altarpiece (1890) of the Church of the Annunziata. He was called to Rome to become professor of ornamentation at the Royal Institute of Fine Arts at Via Ripetta. He painted in Rome at the Consulta, at the church of Santissimi Apostoli in Perugia, at the Palace of Montecitorio and other government palaces. Commissioned by the Provincial Deputation of Perugia to paint the Hall of Palace of the Prefecture with extensive frescoes depicting famous persons from Perugia and historical events. In 1876–1877, he frescoed the Baptism Chapel and the Chapel of San Onofrio of the Cathedral of Perugia.

Among his colleagues at the studio of Valeri were Alessandro Vertami, Domenico Belimi, Guglielmo Mangiarelli, Tito Moretti, Annibale Mariani, Lemma Rossi-Scotti, and Pasquale Frenguelli.

He died in Rome on 19 October 1910.

== Style ==
Bruschi was greatly influenced by the art of England, having lived there from 1862 to 1868. In particular Bruschi spoke often of the art of Frederic Leighton. Italian historian Alessandra Migliorati claims that Domenico Bruschi and Giovanni Costa were particularly responsible for the "aesthetic decadence" in Rome during the end of the century.

== Writings ==
Much of what is known about Bruschi's thinking comes in the form of work as an academician. During the risorgimento a Guida per I Giovani was compiled by Romeo Palazzi and Domenico Bruschi to teach the youth of Italy the methods of fine art in the new nation. The Guida was approved in 1883 by King Umberto I and the Ministero della Pubblica Istruzione. Bruschi was very much a part of this effort to revive the gloried past of Rome. To many, decorations like those in the Lincei, were seen as sumptuous and because of this new decorative movement Rome during the 1880s was often called Bizantina to draw attention to the decadence of the city. Domenico Bruschi claimed in a speech delivered in 1885 that "studious artists" do not produce large papers, grand canvases or labor over copies. He wrote in a letter that "I adore and study the classics for their sentiment, without however, imitating them crudely. Rather they inspire me to make me as original as I can without leaving the circle of classical inquiry." In 1885 Bruschi made an address titled Thoughts on the Art of Painting during the Renaissance.
