= Ulisse Ribustini =

Italian painter (1852–1944)

Ulisse Ribustini (August 26, 1852 – 1944) was an Italian painter, mainly of conventional sacred subjects and genre subjects. He also painted large decorative murals at Ponte della Pietra, at the chapter house of the Cathedral of Perugia, at the parish church of Ferretto, near Castiglione del Lago, and at Gualdo Tadino Cathedral. As a young man he painted the frescoes depicting the Story of the Aeneid for the Sala Consiliare di Civitanova Marche. he also made over 100 illustrations based on Dante's Divine Comedy.

== Biography ==
He was born on August 26, 1852, in Civitanova Marche, Province of Macerata. At ten years old he moved with his family to Perugia; Ulisse's father engaged in the construction of the railway line. He enrolled at the Accademia di Belle Arti di Perugia under Silvestro Valeri. He then moved to Naples, where he studied alongside Annibale Brugnoli under Domenico Morelli.

Returning to Perugia, he taught at the Accademia di Belle Arti di Perugia from 1898 to 1906 as professor of painting, then from 1908 to 1913 as professor of ornamentation. One of his pupils was Gerardo Dottori.

At the Exhibition of Naples del 1877 he exhibited: a head with impressionistic light effects. He painted a St Francis in Death in the Chapel of Santa Maria degli Angeli (la Porziuncola), which was commissioned and exhibited in 1883 at Rome. In 1884 to Turin, he sent the canvas: Semper pauper, and in 1887 to Venice, La Virgin del Rosario. He also painted an altarpiece of Santa Margherita Maria Alacoque (1914) for the church of Sant Antonio Abate at Monte Rubiaglio.
