= Brugnoli =

Brugnoli is a surname. Notable people with the surname include:

- Amalia Brugnoli (1802–1892), Italian ballerina
- Annibale Brugnoli (1843–1915), Italian painter
- Attilio Brugnoli (1880–1937), Italian composer, pianist and musicologist
- Emanuele Brugnoli (1859–1944), Italian painter and engraver
- Patrick Brugnoli (born 1970), Italian ice hockey player
- Renato Brugnoli (born 1969), Swiss footballer
