= Art collection of Fondazione Cassa di Risparmio di Perugia =

Art collection in Perugia, Italy

Coordinates: 43.110°N 12.388°E

The Art Collection of the Fondazione Cassa di Risparmio di Perugia is a private collection of artworks, mainly from the region of Perugia, acquired by former financial institution Cassa di Risparmio di Perugia. In 1992, after the passage of the Legge Amato, the collection was transferred from the bank to the Fondazione Cassa di Risparmio di Perugia, also known as the Fondazione Perugia. The collection is divided among two locations in the city of Perugia: the Palazzo Graziani and the Palazzo Baldeschi. The Palazzo Graziani (1554–1569) was designed by Giacomo Barozzi da Vignola. The building is also notable for its sumptuous main salon, the Sala della Presidenza, which was decorated at the end of the 19th century with large canvases and frescoes painted by Annibale Brugnoli, recalling both events of the Risorgimento and the history of Perugia. The Palazzo Baldeschi al Corso (16th century, named after the noble family descended from Baldus de Ubaldis) was obtained by the foundation on November 28, 2002.

== Collection ==
Label	Painter	Span	Work	Date
1	Francesco Allegrini	1587–1663	Competition between Apollo & Marsyas	
2	Matteo Balducci	1509–1554	Madonna and the Bambino behind Saints John the Baptist and a saint.	
3	Giacinto Boccanera	1666–1746	Samson burns Philistine crops	
4	Giacinto Boccanera	1666–1746	Samson and Delilah	
5	Annibale Brugnoli	1843–1915	Rodolfo Baglioni & Ascanio della Corgna defend Torgiano against Luigi Farnese, Alessandro Vitelli, and Girolamo Orsini (fresco)	1888–1990
6	Annibale Brugnoli	1843–1915	St. Francis prays with his followers during the sack of the city (fresco)	1888–1990
7	Annibale Brugnoli	1843–1915	Battle of Trasimeno of Hannibal versus the Consul Flaminius (fresco)	1888–1990
8	Annibale Brugnoli	1843–1915	The sacrifice to Dea Cupra (fresco)	1888–1990
9	Annibale Brugnoli	1843–1915	The Reception in honor of king Umberto I	1895
10	Annibale Brugnoli	1843–1915	The capitulation of the Apostolic delegate	1891–1895
11	Annibale Brugnoli	1843–1915	The Magistrate with the Gonfalone (standard-bearer) Benedetto Baglioni takes down the first stones of the Pauline Fort	1891–1895
12	Annibale Brugnoli	1843–1915	A Bersagliere guards the Palazzo dei Priori	1891–1895
13	Annibale Brugnoli	1843–1915	The massacre of June 20, 1859	1891–1895
14	Andrea Camassei	1602–1649	Cain kills Abel	
15	Giovanni Domenico Cerrini (il Cavalier Perugino)	1609–1681	Hagar and the Angel	
16	Giovanni Domenico Cerrini (il Cavalier Perugino)	1609–1681	Abraham drives away Hagar	
17	Giovanni Domenico Cerrini (il Cavalier Perugino)	1609–1681	Roman Charity	
18	Nicola Giuli	1720–1784	Still life with flowers, curtained window,& parrot	
19	Matteo da Gualdo	1435–1507	Enthroned Madonna and child with Saints Mary Magdalen & Lucy	
20	Niccolò di Liberatore (l’Alunno)	1430?–1502	Deposition into Tomb	
21	Alessio de Marchis	1684–1782	Rustic veduta with groups of figures	
22	Alessio de Marchis	1684–1782	Countryside with water-mill, peasants & shepherds	
23	Alessio de Marchis	1684–1782	Rustic veduta con farmhouses, waterfall, and two figures	
24	Alessio de Marchis	1684–1782	Landscape with sunset, herder, and two oxen	
25	Alessio de Marchis	1684–1782	Landscape with rustic villa, classical ruins, and shepherd's family	
26	Avanzino Nucci from Gualdo Tadino	1552–1629	St. Peter and the centurion	
27	Avanzino Nucci from Gualdo Tadino	1552–1629	St. Peter & Simon Magus	
28	Vincenzo Pellegrini	1575–1612	Prayer in the Garden	
29	Bartolomeo Ramenghi (il Bagnacavallo	1484–1582	Madonna and Bambino behind Saints Catherine & Anthony	
30	Bartolomeo Ramenghi (il Bagnacavallo	1484–1582	Madonna and child, young St. John, and young female donor	
31	Pietro Vannucci ('Il Perugino)	1450–1523	Madonna with the Bambino and two cherubs	
