= Palazzo Donini =

Italian palace

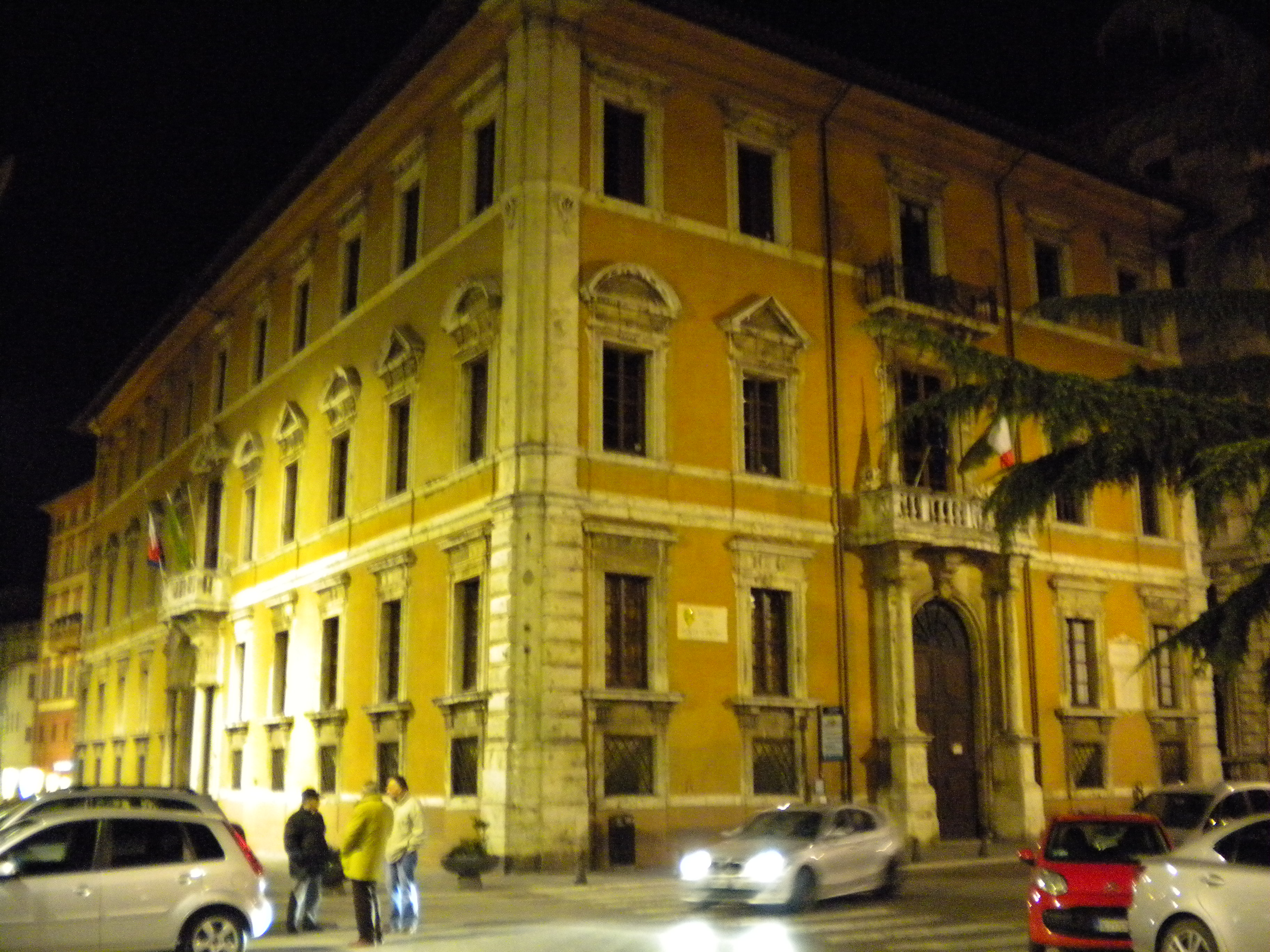
- Interactive map of the Palazzo Donini area

General information
- Location: Perugia, Italy
- Construction started: 1716
- Construction stopped: 1724

Palazzo Donini is an Italian noble palace of the 18th century located in Perugia in Piazza Italia 96. It is the centre of the Regional Council of Region of Umbria.

== Characteristics ==
Built from 1716 to 1724 by an unknown architect, the traditional attribution is to Pietro Carattoli (although unlikely, as the artist from Perugia was barely 13 years old in 1716).

The references to sixteenth Tuscan style and coeval Roman palaces are evident. The architecture with a sober compositional order is scanned by two orders of ledges and three of windows.

On the noble floor, curved gables alternate with triangular ones in travertine. The palace is adorned with 2 large portals, one opens on Corso Vannucci, the other on Piazza Italia. Both present 2 columns in travertine surmounted by a balcony. The inside was richly decorated between 1745 and 1750 by the best exponents of the artistic culture of Perugia at the time, coordinated by Pietro Carattoli; among which: Francesco Appiani, Anton Maria Garbi, Giuseppe Brizi, Giacinto Boccanera and Nicola Giuli.

Pietro Carattoli directed the works of wall decorations and decided the subject to represent.

The main floor contains artworks which utilize perspective and feature mythological subjects. In the Hall of Honor, above the wooden gallery, Francesco Appiani painted “Giove fulminante il cocchio dell’Orgoglio” (Jupiter hitting with lightnings Pride's Chaise). The chapel of the palace is entirely decorated with stuccoes and paintings framed in illusionistic architectural perspective. Over the altar cell there is the “Incoronazione della Vergine” (Coronation of the Virgin) by Francesco Appiani.

The “Sala del Caminetto”, decorated by Carattoli and Giacinto Boccanera, can be considered the most evocative as extreme example of the bold architectonical perspective present in the palace.

In the 19th century it was sold by Pierluigi Donini to the City of Perugia that used it as representative seat. The Austrian Prince of Klemens von Metternich with his chancellery was received there in 1819. Before hosting the Regional Council offices, the palace was the seat of the Faculty of Letters and Philosophy of the University of Perugia.

The permanent collection of Salvatore Fiume can here be seen; Salvatore Fiume was a Sicilian artist who described episodes and characters of Umbria history. Bruno Buitoni, the owner of IBP Industries who commissioned the work, gave it as a gift to the Umbria Region.

It is rather certain, from archival documents, that the palace stands on a pre-existent Roman cistern and a paleo Christian hypogeum, even if the recovered material got lost.
