= Donini =

Donini is an Italian surname. Notable people with the surname include:

- Ambrogio Donini (1903–1991), Italian politician
- Jim Donini (born 1943), American rock climber and alpinist
- Tommaso Donini (1601–1637), Italian painter

== See also ==
- Donnini, surname
- Palazzo Donini, Italian palace
