= Tito Moretti =

Italian painter (1840–1913)

Tito Moretti (Perugia, 1840–1913) was an Italian painter and manuscript illuminator.

== Biography ==
He was the younger brother of Francesco Moretti, who had trained with Silvestro Valeri at the Academy of Fine Arts of Perugia. Tito also trained at the academy, and collaborated for over a decade with Francesco in painting enamel on glass. Tito later became academic of merit and professor of design at the Royal Technical School. Among his works are two large windows: one depicting a Pietà with Angels (1874, Cathedral) and the other a half-figure Madonna.

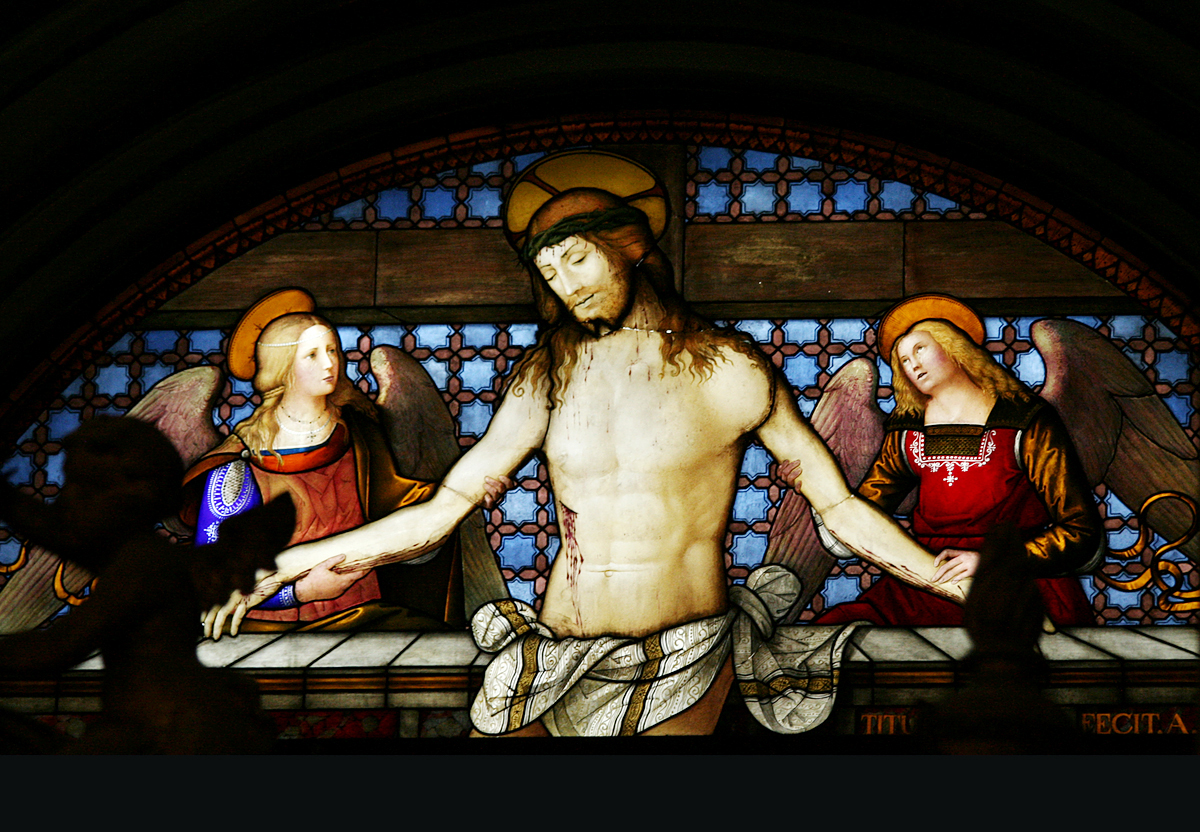
Pieta with Angels

He also worked as a manuscript illuminator of diplomas and awards. In the latter years, he painted many Umbrian landscapes.
