= Scotti (surname) =

Scotti is an Italian surname. Notable people with the surname include:

- Andrea Scotti (1931-2003), Italian film and television actor
- Andrés Scotti (born 1975), Uruguayan football (soccer) player
- Antonio Scotti (1866–1936), Italian operatic baritone
- Ben Scotti (1937–2025), American football player
- Carlo Scotti (1904–1961), Italian boxer
- Diego Scotti (born 1977), Uruguayan footballer
- Francesco Scotti (born 1983), Italian footballer
- Friedrich von Scotti (1889-1969), German World War II general
- Gerry Scotti (born 1956), Italian TV presenter
- Gian Giacomo Gallarati Scotti (1886-1983), Italian politician, 5th podestà of Milan
- Gianbernardino Scotti (died 1568), Italian Roman Catholic bishop and cardinal
- Gio Scotti (born 2006), Italian influencer and model
- Giovanni Scotti (1911-1992), Italian ice hockey player
- Gottardo Scotti (1447-1481), Italian painter
- James V. Scotti (born 1960), American astronomer
- Luigi Scotti (born 1932), Italian judge and minister of justice
- Mike Scotti (fl. early 21st century), United States Marine and author
- Mikhail Scotti (1812–1861), Russian painter
- Nick Scotti (born 1966), American actor and singer
- Ottavio Scotti (1904-1975), Italian art director
- Pasquale Scotti (born 1958), Italian criminal and boss of the Camorra
- Piero Scotti (1909–1976), Italian racing driver
- Roger Scotti (1925–2001), French football player
- Tino Scotti (1905–1984), Italian actor
- Tommaso Scotti (died 1556), Italian bishop of Terni
- Tony Scotti (born 1939), American actor and producer
- Umberto Scotti (fl. 1885–1904), one of the first players of Italian side A.C. Milan
- Vincenzo Scotti (born 1933), Italian politician and government minister
- Vito Scotti (1918–1996), American actor

== See also ==
- Scotti family
- Lemmo Rossi-Scotti, count (1848-1926), Italian late-Romantic painter, mainly of battle scenes
