= Scottis =

Scottis (Older Scots form of the Modern Scots "Scots" meaning "Scottish") and may refer to:

- Early Scots
- Scotch (disambiguation)
- Goidelic language
- Scots language

== See also ==
- Scotti (disambiguation)
