= Carlo Spiridione Mariotti =

Italian painter

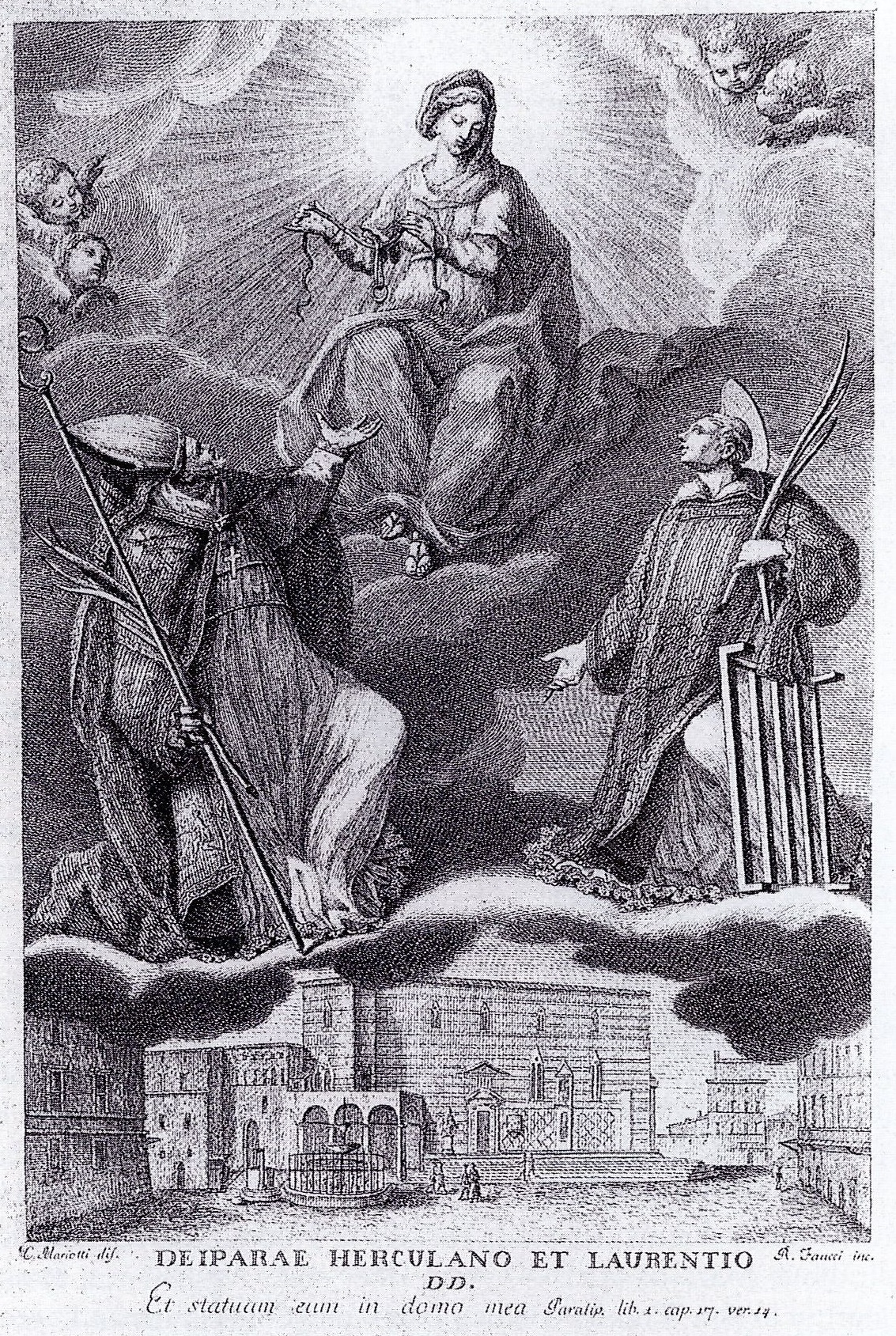
"Madonna col Santo Anello e Santi Ercolano e Lorenzo Patroni di Perugia"

Carlo Spiridione Mariotti (1726 – 10 May 1790) was an Italian painter born in Perugia; he often painted genre scenes.

== History ==
He was a pupil of Giacinto Boccanera and Antonio Maria Garbi in Perugia.
