= Alessio de Marchis =

Italian painter

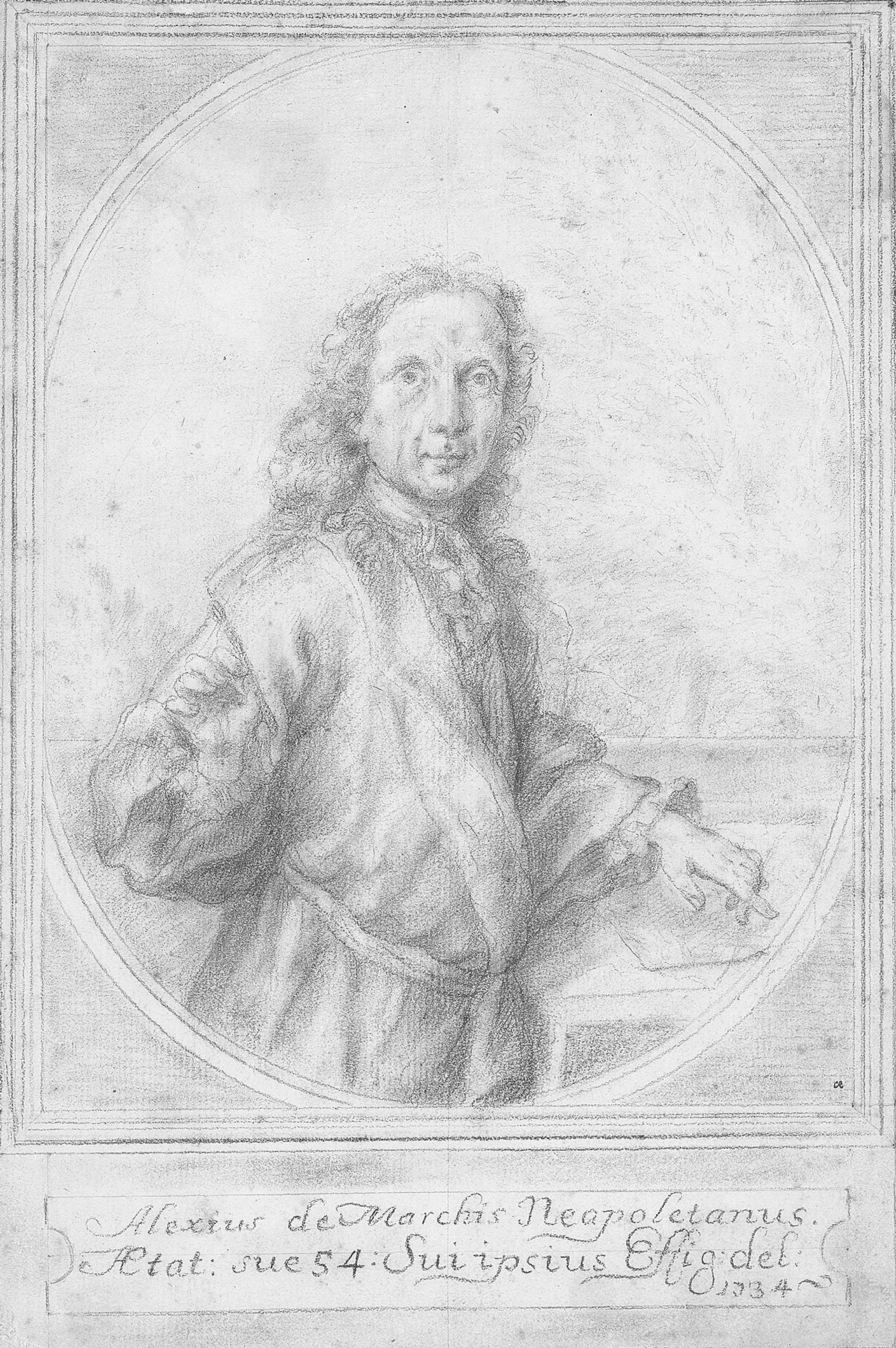
Self portrait (1734)

Alessio de Marchis or il Marchis (1684–1752) was an Italian painter of the early 18th century, active mainly in Rome and Urbino, both in the Papal States, mainly as a landscape painter.

Alessio was born in Naples, Kingdom of Naples, and was known to be active in 1710. He painted in the Palazzo Ruspoli and the Palazzo Albani in Rome. He was said to have been excellent at depictions of fires, and in attempting to paint one from nature, set up a damaging conflagration. For this, he apparently was sentenced to years as a galley slave, until he was pardoned under Pope Clement XI, for whom Alessio painted many canvases of perspective, landscape, and marinescapes. He was said to have been influenced by Salvatore Rosa and Claude Lorrain. His son was also a landscape artist. Alessio died in 1752 in Urbino.

== Sources ==
- Boni, Filippo de' (1852). Biografia degli artisti ovvero dizionario della vita e delle opere dei pittori, degli scultori, degli intagliatori, dei tipografi e dei musici di ogni nazione che fiorirono da'tempi più remoti sino á nostri giorni. Seconda Edizione.. Venice; Googlebooks: Presso Andrea Santini e Figlio. p. 15.
- Two attributed works at Pinacoteca Fortunato Duranti
- Paintings at Fondazione Cassa di Risparmio di Perugia
