= Meo di Siena =

Italian painter

Polyptych signed by Meo di Guido, from the high altar of the Abbazia di Santa Maria di Valdiponte, Montelabate, outside Perugia

Mèo da Siena (active 1310–1333) was an Italian painter active in Umbria in a late-Gothic style.

He is also known as Bartolomeo Guarnieri or Meo da Guido da Siena. He may be the son of a painter, Guido Guarnieri or Gratiani or Graziani of Siena, who settled in Perugia in 1319.

He was influenced by Duccio, and is known for a few works in Umbria, including a polyptych of the Virgin and Saints in the Galleria Nazionale of Perugia. Attributed to Meo or his studio are also a triptych in the Museum of the Duomo of Perugia and a polyptych originally in the church of San Pietro
