= Donnini =

Donnini is an Italian surname. Notable people with the surname include:

- Dennis Donnini (1925–1945), British soldier
- Dionigi Donnini (1681–1743), Italian painter
- Girolamo Donnini (1681 – 1743), Italian painter
- Girolamo Donnini (composer) (fl. 1719 – died 1752), Italian composer and conductor
- Giulio Donnini (1923–2001), Italian actor

== See also ==
- Donini, surname
