= Sant'Onofrio Altarpiece =

1484 painting by Luca Signorelli

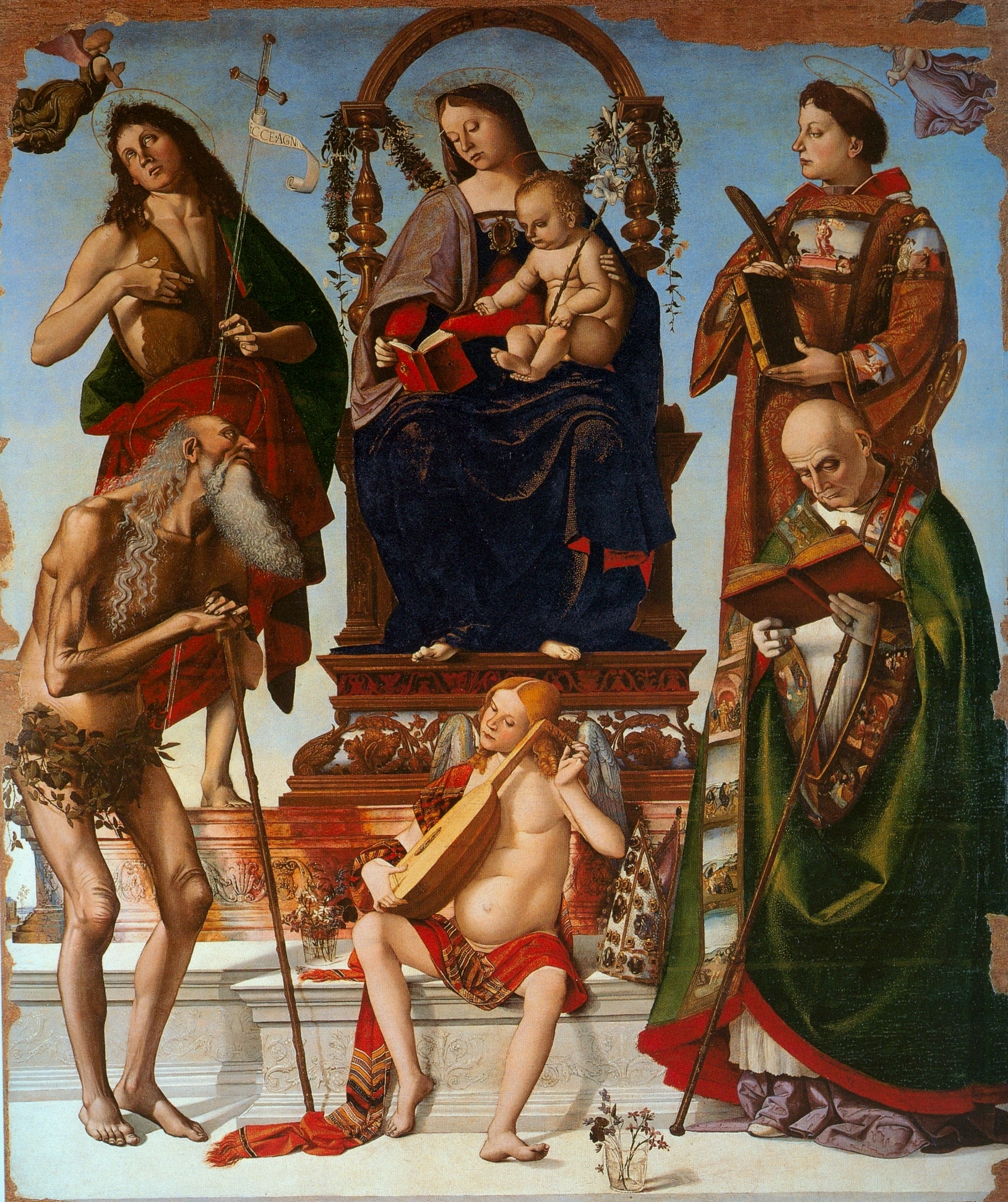
- Artist: Luca Signorelli
- Year: 1484
- Type: Tempera and oil on panel
- Dimensions: 221 cm × 189 cm (87 in × 74 in)
- Location: Museo dell'Opera del Duomo; Perugia, Italy

The Sant'Onofrio Altarpiece is a painting by the Italian Renaissance painter Luca Signorelli, housed in the Museo dell'Opera del Duomo in the Cathedral of Perugia, Italy. It was painted for the church in 1484, commissioned by bishop Jacopo Vagnucci, a native of Cortona, Signorelli's birthplace.

== Description ==
The scene portrayed is a Holy Conversation, with a high throne where the Virgin and Child sit, placed over a Classical-style pedestal and crowned by a small engraved arch featuring a festoon with vegetables. Mary is reading a Bible, while Jesus holds a white lily, symbolizing her virginity and purity.

Over a gilded step are St. John the Baptist and St. Lawrence, surmounted by two flying angels. On the marble step below, Signorelli portrayed a sitting angel playing a lute, perhaps a homage to elements typical of the contemporary Venetian school (such as the San Cassiano Altarpiece by Antonello da Messina). The angel resembles one painted by Signorelli in the Basilica della Santa Casa, at Loreto, a few years earlier. Standing on the foreground pavement are St. Onuphrius and St. Herculanus, the patrons of Perugia.

Influences in the style of the painting include Ercole de' Roberti's Santa Maria di Porto Altarpiece, Donatello and Filippo Lippi (in the fierce figure of Lawrence) and, in the figure of Herculanus, that of Piero della Francesca's St. Augustine.

== Sources ==
- Paolucci, Antonio (2004). "Luca Signorelli". Pittori del Rinascimento. Florence: Scala. ISBN 88-8117-099-X.
