= Silvestro Valeri =

Italian painter (1814–1902)

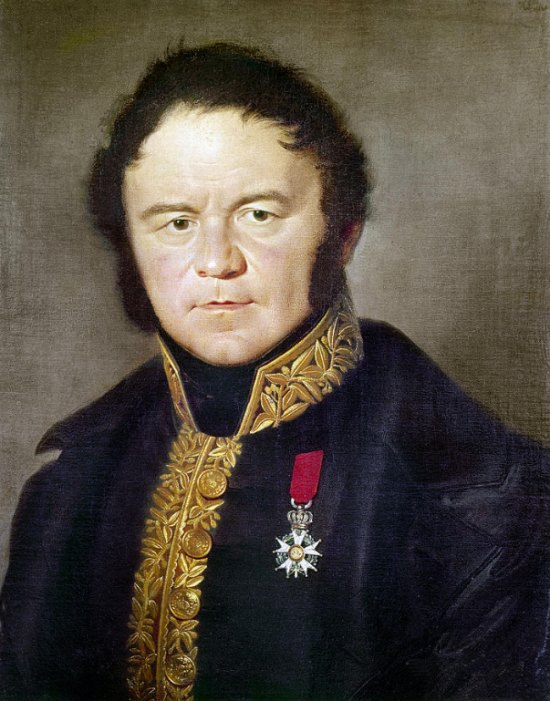

Silvestro Valeri (Rome, December 31, 1814 – 1902) was an Italian painter and educator. He taught at Accademia di Belle Arti di Perugia.

== Biography ==
As a young man, he was enrolled in the Academy of Fine Arts of St Luke in Rome. By his second year in 1827, he won first prize in design with The Dying Gladiator. Among his instructors was Tommaso Minardi, professor of design at the Academy. Valeri remained for many years as a major assistant of Minardi. One of his first works was a San Primo, commissioned by Prince Don Filippo Doria for the church of Santa Maria in Via Lata in Rome. In 1837, when there was an epidemic of cholera in Rome, Prince Borghese commissioned an oil canvas depicting St Francis of Sales visits prisoners, and Four Evangelists, in tempera for the private chapel of Prince Doria. The Prince also commissioned a Nativity for the church of the Fornari Tedeschi, next to Sant' Andrea della Valle.

Valeri also painted portraits. In 1845, he won a competition for a position as professor of painting at the Accademia di Belle Arti di Perugia. He remained at this post for 28 years. Among his pupils were Annibale Brugnoli, Ulisse Ribustini, Domenico Bruschi, Francesco Moretti, Count Lemmo Rossi Scotti, Eliseo Fattorini, and Luigi Sabatini. Among his paintings as professor were portraits of two prominent families; frescoes (1854) in the apse of Todi Cathedral; two oil canvases for the church of the Monastery of San Francesco of Todi; an Immaculate Conception, and the other St Francis receiving stigmata. In 1804, while in Perugia, he was named honorary associate of the Institute of Fine Arts of the Marche in Urbino; in 1805, he was knighted into the Order of Saints Maurice and Lazarus; and in 1871, he was named academic professor of merit at the Roman Academy of St Luke. In 1873, he retired, married as his second wife the contessa Sistilia Francisci, widow of Piccini, and moved to a small villa (villetta Torricella) near Todi. He continued to paint there. One of his pupils was Napoleone Verga.
