= Scotti =

Scotti may refer to:

== People ==
- Scotti (surname), a list of people with the Italian surname
- Scotti family, an aristocratic family centered around Piacenza in Northern Italy
- Scotti Hill, American musician Scott Lawrence Mulvehill (born 1964)
- Elizabeth Scotti Lechuga (born 1983), American former racing cyclist
- Charles Scotti Madison (born 1959), American baseball player

== Other uses ==
- 202P/Scotti, a comet
- Scotti Brothers Records, California-based record label

== See also ==
- Scoti, an ancient tribe from Ireland and Britain
