= Nicola Consoni =

Italian painter (1814–1884)

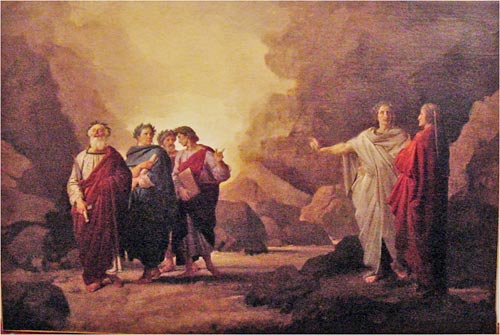
Dante in Limbo (c. 1850). The figures to the left are Homer, Horace, Ovid and Lucan.

Nicola Consoni (1814–1884) was an Italian painter, mainly of sacred and historic subjects.

== Biography ==
Nicola Consoni was born in 1814 in Ceprano, Province of Frosinone, in the region of Lazio, Italy.

He was a pupil of Giovanni Sanguinetti at the Accademia di Belle Arti di Perugia. He later moved to Rome, and joined the studio of Tommaso Minardi, and later Pio Joris. In Rome, he was commissioned by Pope Pius IX to fresco some of the second story loggias of the Vatican Palace and the Vatican Library. The frescoes depict scenes from the New Testament. He also designed the mosaics, made in deliberately primitive early Christian style for the facade of the rebuilt Basilica of Saint Paul Outside the Walls. He painted some of the frescoes in the central nave. He completed some restorations including frescoes by Raphael in the church of San Severo of Perugia. He also helped restore mosaics in the apse of Basilica of San Giovanni Laterano.

He also received commissions from Queen Victoria to paint the altarpiece, depicting The Resurrection, and pendentives with the Evangelists in her Royal Mausoleum at Frogmore at the Home Park, Windsor. It was all completed in a Neoclassical style recalling Raphael.

He had a commission from Monsignor Josip Juraj Strossmayer, bishop of Diakovar (1849-1905), to paint a Christ and an Immaculate Conception for his Cathedral, now in Croatia. For many years, he lived in the Palazzo Campanari in the Rione of Ripetta, Rome.

Consoni was awarded the Order of the Crown of Italy and the Order of Saint Stephen. He became honorary member of many artistic societies and was once president of the Accademia di San Luca in Rome.

He died in 1884 in Rome.
