= Fabio Mauroner =

Italian painter

Fabio Mauroner (1884 – 1944) was an Italian painter and engraver, known mainly for vedute of Venice.

== Biography ==
He was born in Udine and moved to Venice in 1905. In Venice, Fabio shared a studio with Amedeo Modigliani, while studying printmaking with Edward M. Synge. Over the next thirty years, Mauroner executed approximately one hundred and thirty prints. He was a friend of Emanuele Brugnoli, another modern Venetian vedutista.

In 2011, Mauroner and Brugnoli were featured in an exhibition (The Heirs of Canaletto: Fabio Mauroner and Emanuele Brugnoli in Venice, 1905-1940) at the Italian Embassy in Washington D.C., which took place at the same time that an exhibit titled Canaletto and his rivals was being held at the National Gallery of Art in the same city.
