= Napoleone Verga =

Italian painter

Napoleone Verga (Perugia, February 1833 − Nice, 1916) was an Italian painter, mainly of illuminated manuscripts, but also of paintings.

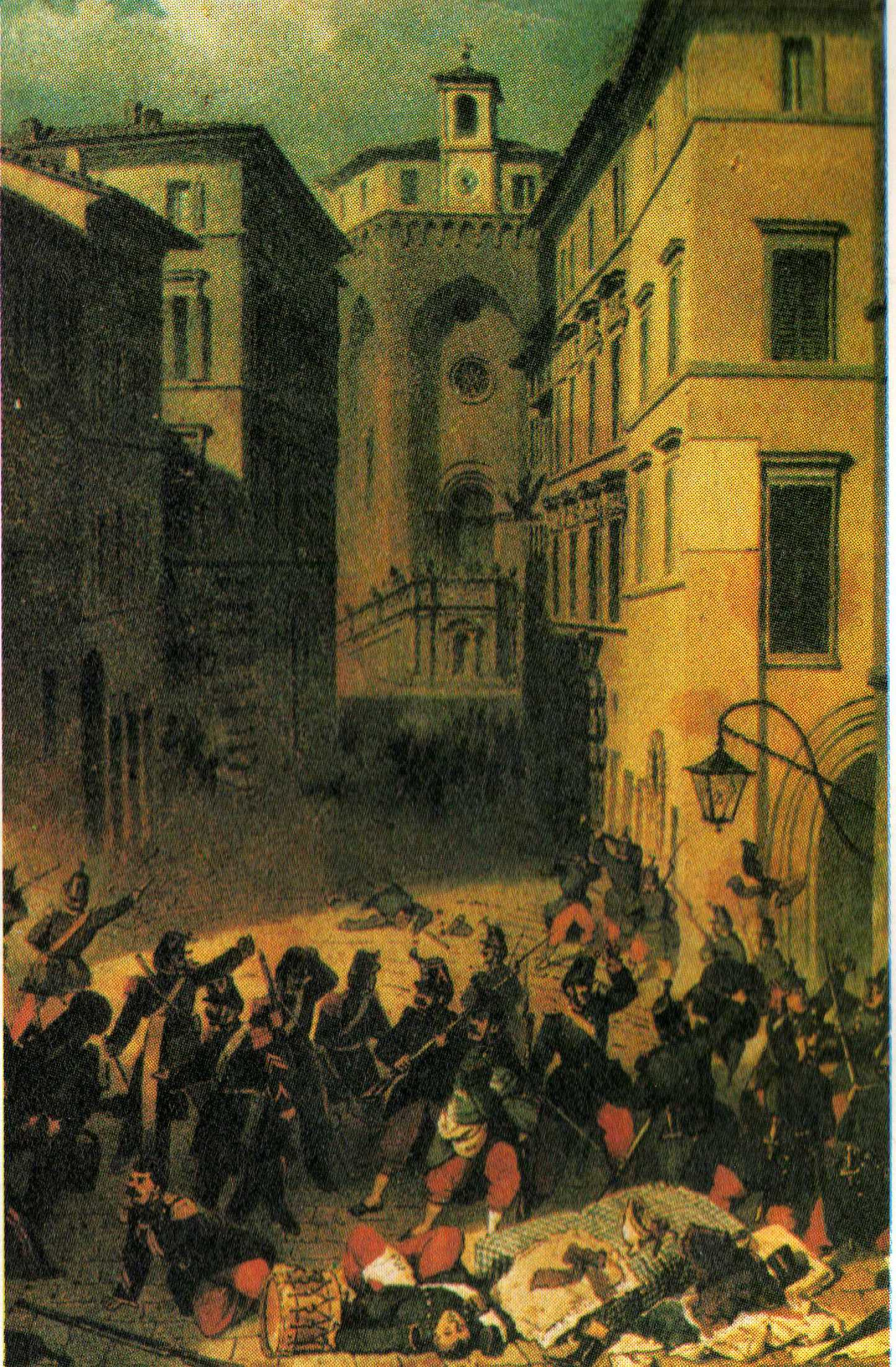
Section of Massacre at Perugia (Gli svizzeri al crocevia ).

== Biography ==
He initially studied design at the Academy of Perugia: then he moved to Rome, where he studied painted decoration with Silvestro Valeri at the Accademia di San Luca. In 1858 he returned to Perugia, where he excelled in illuminated manuscripts, which became avidly sought after by Italian and foreign collectors. At the same time an album of monuments by Verga and other artists was presented to the Pope by the apostolic delegate. In 1858, he submitted an essay work to his native city, he paints a cabinet with oil panels.

In 1861, Verga was nominated professor of design at the Scuole Normali for men and the parallel School for women of Perugia. He was awarded a medal at the Exposition of Florence for works of illuminated writing: two beautiful diplomas of honor given to the marchese Gioacchino Pepoli: one commissioned by the city government of Perugia, the other by the city government of Terni. On November 22, 1862, he was awarded a medal at the International Exposition of London for his works of manuscript illumination.

Among other works is a diploma of citizenship in four pages, conferred by the city of Perugia to the engineer cav. Luigi Tatti of Milan. Venne exhibited at the National Exposition di Milan in 1881. The same engineer commissioned from Verga two works, one of them a triptych with images, awarded a medal at the 1879 Exposition regionale at Perugia.

Verga painted decorations in Casa Vicarelli at Perugia, depicting episodes in the war of Independence of 1859−1860. He also painted these subjects in a series of small paintings in tempera and watercolor, now at the Academy of Fine Arts of Perugia. He had been a participant in some of the events. The 22×37 cm canvases depict:

- I Perugini alle Terme di San Galgano
- Gli Svizzeri a Porta San Pietro
- I Piemontesi nella Piazza del Comune
- Combattimento nella Piazza Grande
- Assalto di Porta San Costanzo da parte dei papalini contro i rivoltosi di Perugia il 20 giugno 1859
- Assalto dei Piemontesi a Porta Santa Margherita il 14 settembre 1860
- Gli Svizzeri al Crocevia
- Veduta della Piazza Grimana intorno al 1870

Verga was nominated honorary member of diverse Italian Academies of Fine Arts, including Perugia, Milan, Urbino, and of the Accademia Properziana of Assisi. To the Academy of Perugia he was nominated consigliere, a commission he maintained even after moving to Milan in 1881 and Nice in 1896.
