= Gualdo Tadino Cathedral =

Cathedral in Gualdo Tadino, Umbria, Italy

Coordinates: 43.2312488°N 12.7852429°E

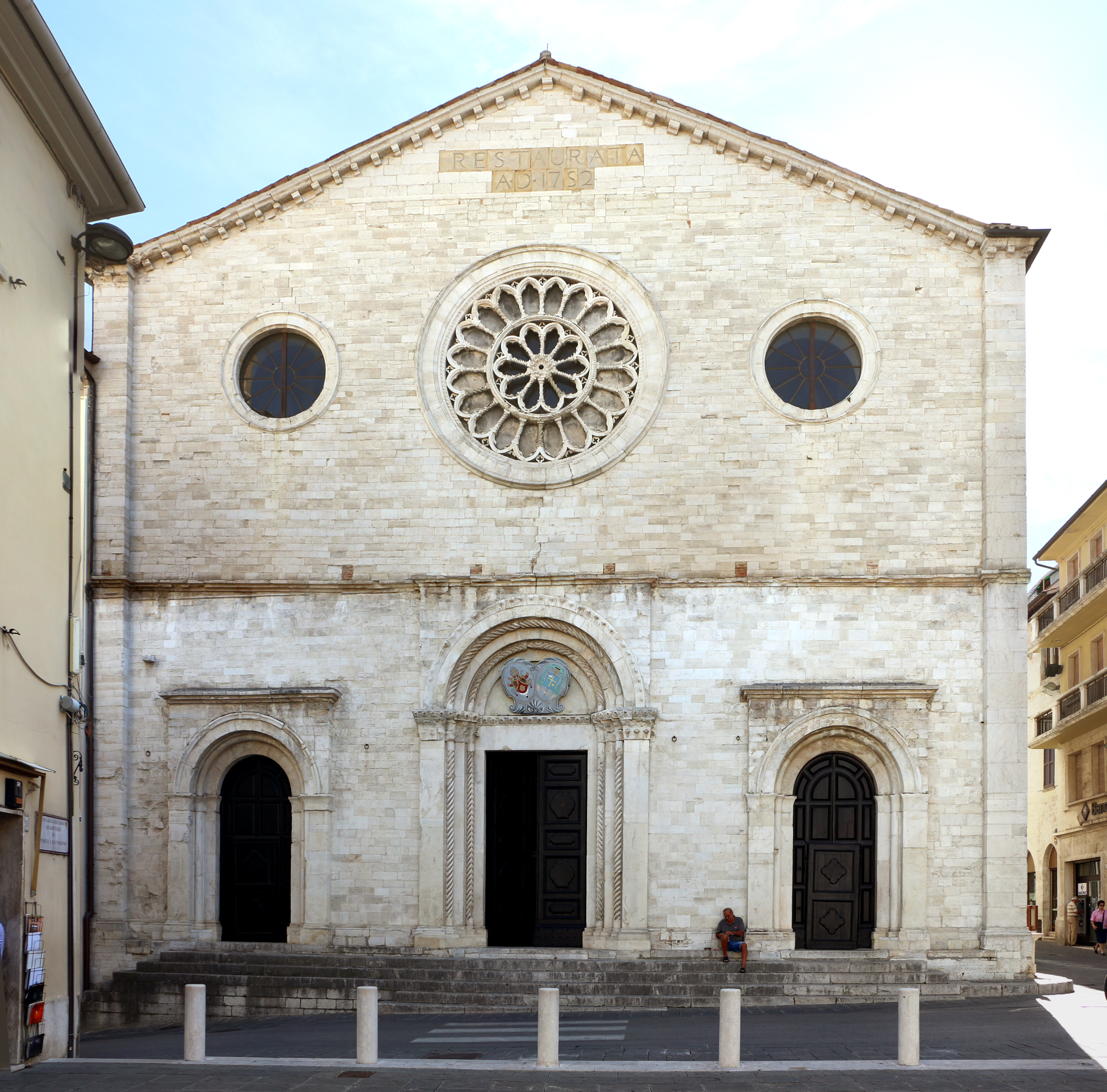
Detail of west front with rose window

Gualdo Tadino Cathedral (Italian: Duomo di Gualdo Tadino; Basilica Cattedrale di San Benedetto) is a Roman Catholic cathedral in Gualdo Tadino in Umbria, Italy, dedicated to Saint Benedict of Nursia. Formerly a Benedictine abbey church, it became a cathedral in 1915, and is now a co-cathedral in the diocese of Assisi-Nocera Umbra-Gualdo Tadino.

In January 1980 Pope John Paul II granted it the honour of the status of a minor basilica.

== History ==
The present cathedral is also known as "San Benedetto nuovo" ("new St. Benedict's") to distinguish it from another building, "San Benedetto vecchio" ("old St. Benedict's"), a monastery constructed by the Benedictines after 1006 outside the city walls. Because of the insecurity of the location the monks moved the monastery inside the walls in 1256, as is recorded in a stone inscription on the outside wall of the building: A.D. MCCLVI TPE G ABBATIS H CENOBIU E TRASLATU IN GUALDO ("In A.D. 1256 in the time of Abbot G. this monastery was moved into Gualdo").

The new abbey and the adjoining church were built in a mixture of the Romanesque and Gothic styles, but were refurbished further during the following centuries, particularly in the 18th and 19th centuries: the interior was completely refitted in the 19th century by the architect Virgilio Vespignani. The greater part of the painted decoration originates from 1924 and is the work of Ulisse Ribustini. On the death of Virginio Vespignani, the work was continued by his son Francesco and by the architect Costantino Sneider, his assistant, as is recorded in a stone by the entrance to the campanile.

In 1915 it was declared a cathedral honoris causa by Pope Benedict XV in memory of the ancient diocese of Tadinum. Since 1986 it has been a co-cathedral in the diocese of Assisi-Nocera Umbra-Gualdo Tadino.

== Description ==
The west front of the cathedral is divided into two by a cornice: below are three portals (of which that in the centre has spiral columns and capitals) and above, between two oculi, a Romanesque rose window, an artistic glory of the city. These elements are all that remain of the original Romanesque building. The campanile of 1914 is a recent construction, occasioned by the demolition of the preceding one, which was dangerous because of damage caused by an earthquake at the end of the 18th century. On the south side of the cathedral is a Renaissance fountain attributed to Antonio da Sangallo the Elder.

The interior is divided into three aisles (with galleries over the side aisles), groin vaulting and semicircular apse, beneath which is the 19th-century crypt. Of artistic note is the high altar, rebuilt on site in 1965 using 14th-century elements of the original: of especial value are the bas reliefs by Guglielmo Ciani of Perugia depicting episodes from the life of Saint Benedict of Nursia. One of the side chapels is dedicated to one of the patron saints of the city, the hermit Blessed Angelo, whose remains rest in an urn of bronze and silver.

== Bibliography ==
- Valdes, Giuliano, 1993: Art and History of Umbria. Bonecchi ISBN 9788870099843 (online version)
