= Annibale Brugnoli =

Italian painter

Annibale Brugnoli (22 February 1843 – 11 December 1915) was an Italian painter, mainly of genre and historical pieces, in oil and fresco.

== Biography ==
He was born in Perugia, where he initially studied at the Accademia di Belle Arti di Perugia under Silvestro Valeri. Brugnoli and his fellow student at the academy, Ulisse Ribustini, then moved to Naples to work in the studio with Domenico Morelli. Returning to Perugia, he was mentored by Federico Faruffini. At the age of twenty, he joined Garibaldi in his wars for independence.

Brugnoli helped fresco the Italian Pavilion at the Parisian exposition of 1878. In 1880 in Rome, he helped fresco the cupola of the Teatro Costanzi (now, Teatro dell'Opera di Roma). He became much in demand as a fresco painter. In Milan, he decorated the grand hall of Villa Marsaglia and the cupola of the Teatro Lirico Internazionale. In Perugia, he frescoed the main salon of the Palace Hotel and painted the large canvases on the history of Umbria in the hall of the Banca Commerciale. In 1895 he painted the fresco in the hall of the Commercial Bank of Perugia. Although dismissed by his contemporaries, the paintings were masterful works of art, depicting the historical scenes and subjects such as the Battle of Lake Trasimene and a reception for Umberto I.

Brugnoli died in 1915 in Perugia.

== Authorship ==
Brugnoli also authored two small books. The first was entitled The Tomb of Vittorio Emanuele. The second, entitled New Road was published in Perugia in 1915.
