= Emanuele Brugnoli =

Italian painter

Emanuele Brugnoli (Bologna, 1859 – 1944, Venice) was an Italian painter and engraver, mainly of vedute (i.e. 'views' of cityscapes and other vistas) of Venice and northern Italy.

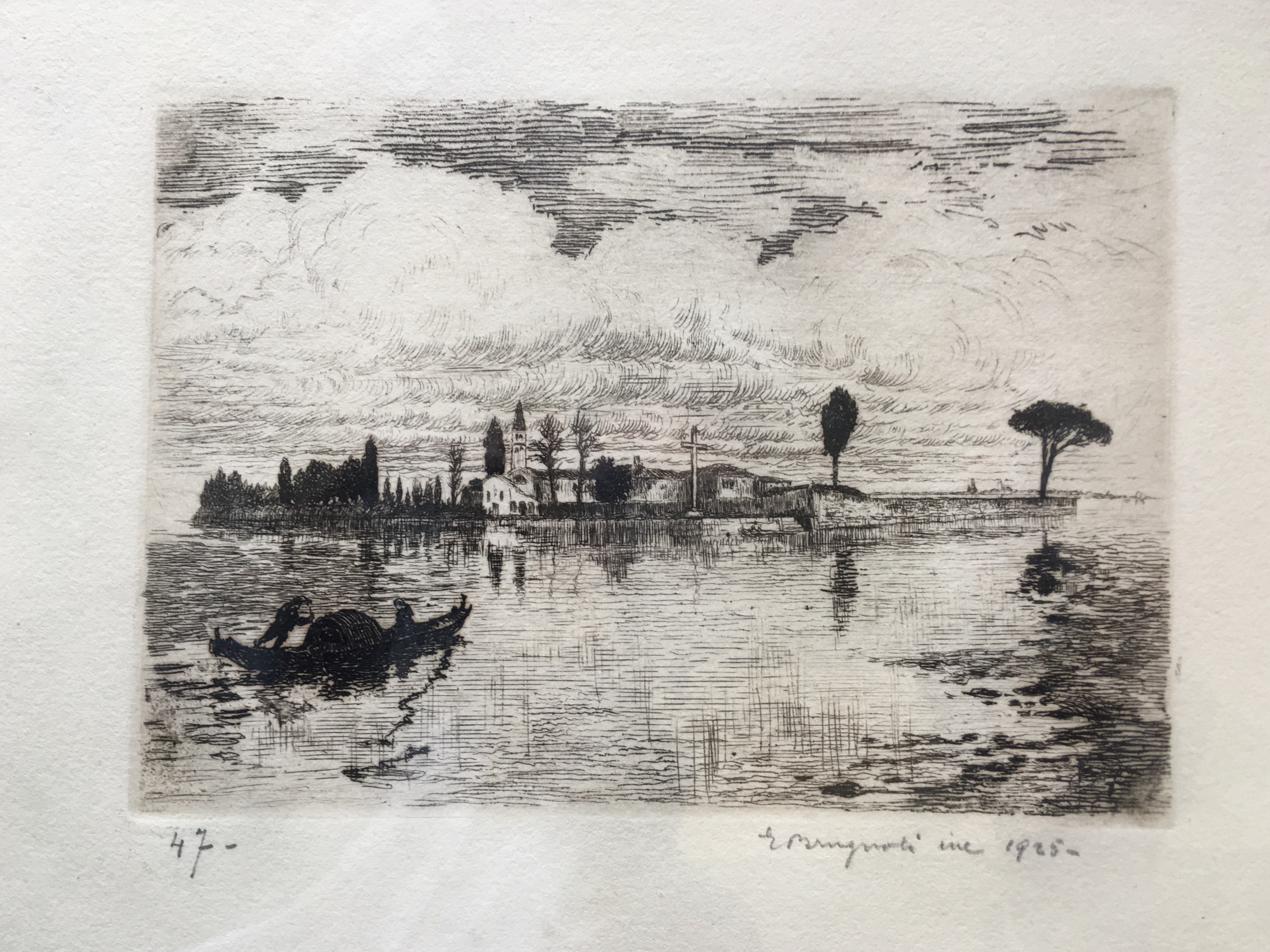
Etching by Brugnoli, depicting the Isola di San Francesco del Deserto, a small monastery island near Venice, Italy. Dated 1925.

== Biography ==
Emanuele Brugnoli was a close friend of Fabio Mauroner, another modern Venetian vedutista. His paintings have an impressionist style, but his etchings and engravings are far more detailed and accurate. In 1886, at the Promotrice of Florence, he displayed a painting of the Bacino di San Marco. At the sixth International Exposition of Venice (1906), he displayed a Silenzi Veneziani.

Brugnoli moved to Venice in 1880 and began teaching at the Accademia of Venice in 1912, teaching etching. Art historians see Brugnoli's graphical works in the context of the European etching revival in the last quarter of the 19th century. Alessia del Bianco, in a summary of her thesis on Brugnoli (Emanuele Brugnoli e la Scuola di Incisione veneziana), points at the "process of reaffirmation of etching as an autonomous and original language in Venice between the end of the nineteenth century and the early twentieth century." In 2011, Mauroner and Brugnoli were featured in an exhibition (The Heirs of Canaletto: Fabio Mauroner and Emanuele Brugnoli in Venice, 1905-1940) at the Italian Embassy in Washington D.C., which took place at the same time that an exhibit titled Canaletto and his rivals was being held at the National Gallery in the same city.
