= Patrick Brugnoli =

Italian ice hockey player

Personal information
- Nationality: Italian
- Born: 12 April 1970 (age 55) Bormio, Italy

Sport
- Sport: Ice hockey

Patrick Brugnoli (born 12 April 1970) is an Italian ice hockey player. He competed in the men's tournaments at the 1994 Winter Olympics and the 1998 Winter Olympics.
