= Gottardo Scotti =

Italian painter of the 15th century

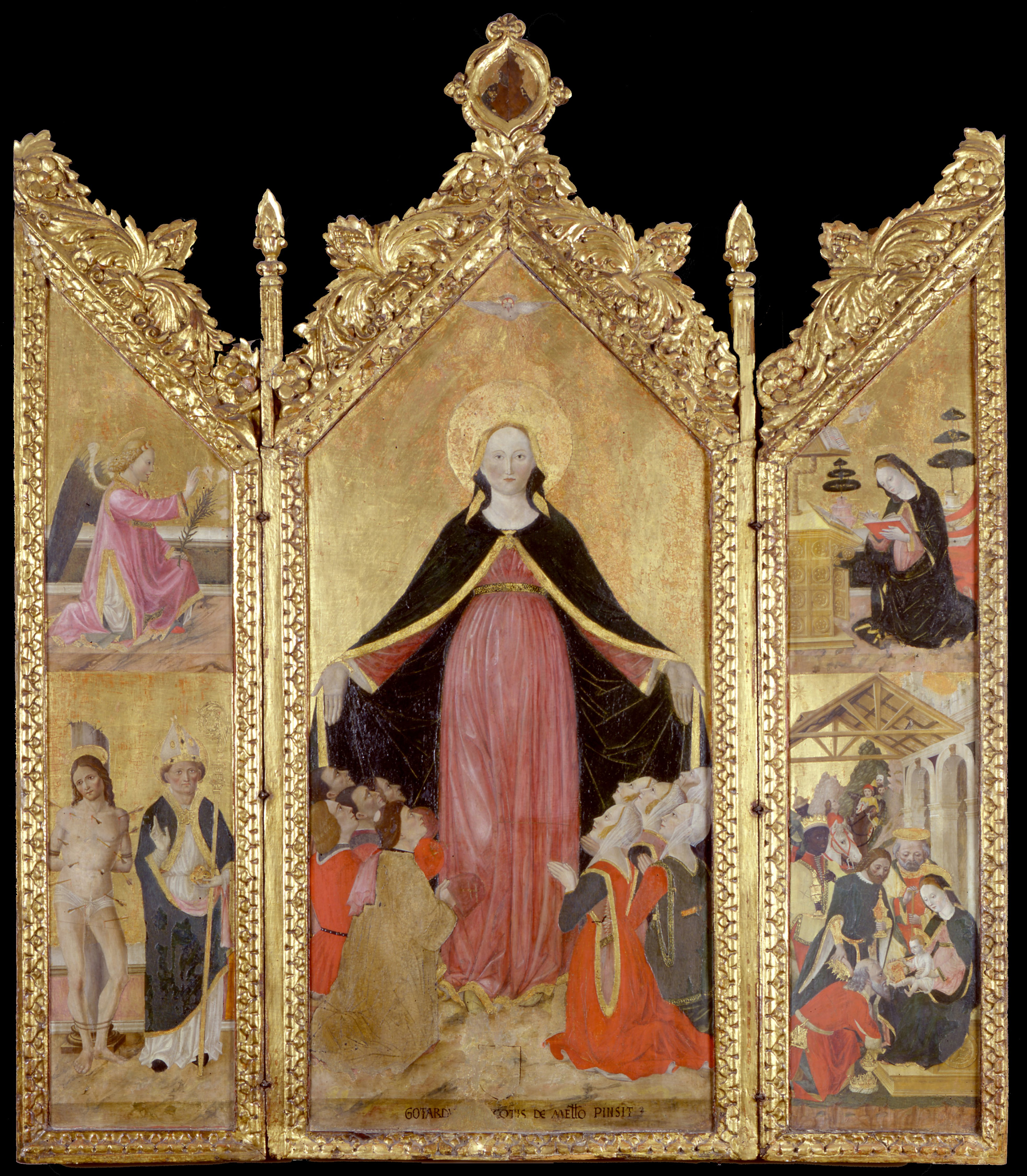
Triptych of the Madonna of Mercy

Gottardo Scotti (active 1457 – 1481) was an Italian painter of the Renaissance period.

== Biography ==
He was born in Piacenza, but was active in Milan. In 1457, along with Cristoforo da Monza, he made estimates for a Maestà painted by Ambrogio Zavattari for the Milan Cathedral. In 1481, he was a member of the guild of painters and active in the Cathedral and Castle. In the Museo Poldi Pezzoli, a triptych is attributed to Gottardo depicting a Virgin of the Misericordia, an Annunciation, an Adoration of the Magi, St Sebastian and a holy bishop.

His son, Bernardo Scotti, painted in Cassino for the Maresciallo Trivulzio. Bernardo painted frescoes for the apse of the church of Cassino Scanasio.

Four other painters of the name Scotti were active in Lombardy during the 15th century: Melchiorre Scotti of Piacenza was active between 1430 and 1454 in the Duomo of Milan; Giorgio Scotti active in Como circa 1464; a Stefano Scotti was a master of Gaudenzio Ferrari; and a Felice Scotti painted glass in Como and in the church of Santa Croce in Boscaglia near Como.
