= Pietro Carattoli =

Italian painter

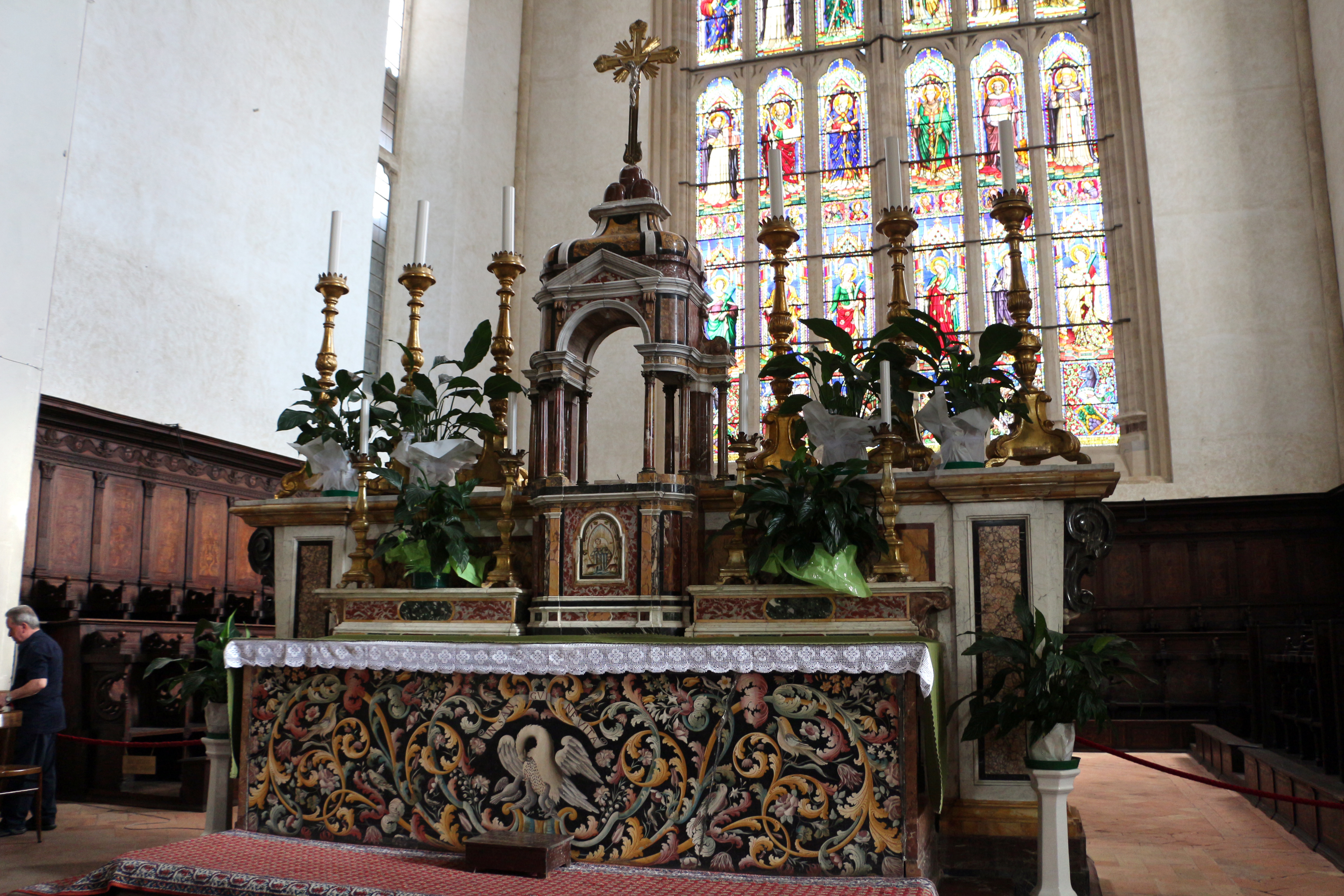
Altare di San Domenico a Perugia

Pietro Carattoli (1703 in Perugia – after 1762) was an Italian painter of quadratura. He also made some smale scale architectural designs, such as the portal of the Cathedral of Perugia.

He was active in Perugia, where he painted for the chapel of sacrament in church of San Pietro, for the Palazzo Donini, and Palazzo Antinori
