= Accademia di Belle Arti di Perugia =

Fine arts school in Perugia, Italy

- Accademia di belle arti di Perugia "Pietro Vannucci"
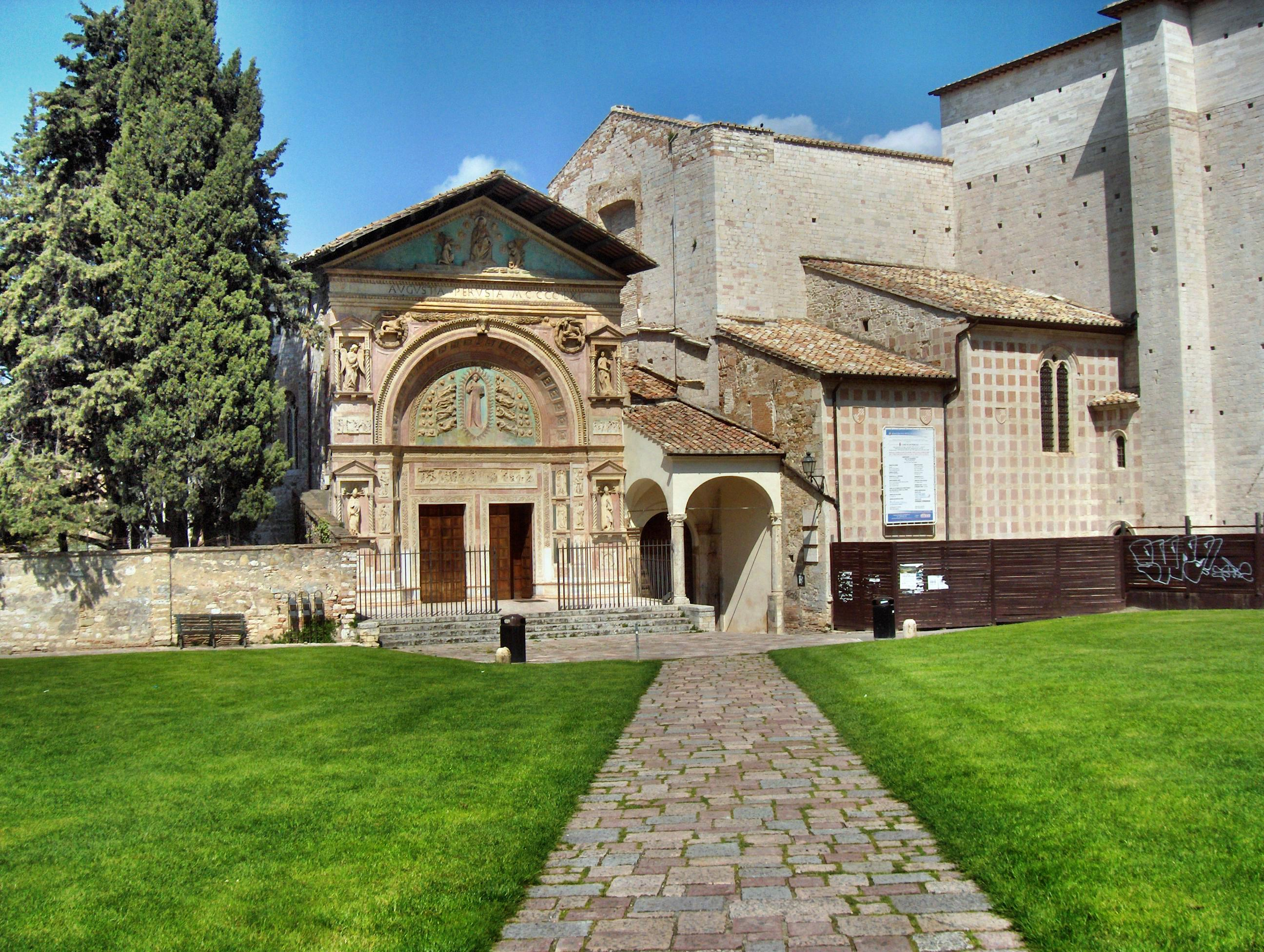
- Former names: l’Accademia del Disegno
- Type: academy of fine arts, private
- Established: 1573
- President: Sergio Rampini
- Director: Paolo Belardi
- Students: more than 600
- Undergraduates: painting, sculpture, artistic design for the enterprises, scenography
- Postgraduates: painting, sculpture, graphic arts, scenography
- Location: Perugia, Umbria, Italy; 43.1137°N 12.3827°E
- Website: www.abaperugia.org

The Accademia di Belle Arti di Perugia ("Academy of Fine Arts of Perugia") is a private tertiary academy of art in Perugia, in Umbria in central Italy. It is not one of the 20 official Italian state academies of fine art, but is legally recognised by the Ministero dell'Istruzione, dell'Università e della Ricerca, the Italian ministry of education and research, which gives its full name as Accademia di Belle Arti Legalmente Riconosciuta di Perugia "Pietro Vannucci". The academy became an autonomous degree-awarding institution under law no. 508 dated 21 December 1999.

== History ==
The school was founded in 1573, and was initially named l’Accademia del Disegno (English: The Academy of Drawing). The school was established on the initiative of the painter Orazio Alfani and the architect and mathematician Raffaello Sozi, and is among the oldest institutions of its kind in Italy; the Accademia di Belle Arti di Firenze had been established eleven years earlier. The school occupies the former convent of the San Francesco al Prato.

There were many notable faculty, including Tommaso Minardi (from 1819 until 1822), and Silvestro Valeri (from 1845 until 1873). Students from the school included Annibale Brugnoli.

== Library, archive, and collections ==
The Royal Academy has an important collection of books, archives which include a gallery of over 600 plaster casts, and works of art accessible for research and display.

In 1573 the same year as the school's founding, plaster casts that had been taken from Michelangelo's original sculptures at the Medici Chapel and donated to the school by Vincenzo Danti. Other plaster casts in the gallery include works by Antonio Canova and Bertel Thorvaldsen. Paintings in the archives include works by Mariano Guardabassi, Annibale Brugnoli, Domenico Bruschi, Armando Spadini, Gerardo Dottori, Mario Mafai, Alberto Burri, among others.
