= Lemmo Rossi-Scotti =

Italian painter (1848–1926)

Count Lemmo Cesare Rossi-Scotti (24 February 1848 – 23 December 1926) was an Italian painter, mainly of battle scenes, in a late-Romantic style.

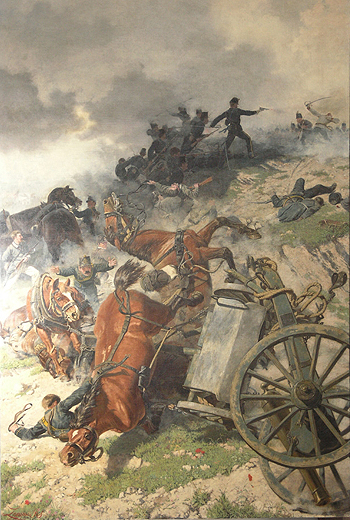
Captain Roberto Perrone defends the Belvedere at the Battle of Custoza (Milan)

== Biography ==
He was born in Perugia. He studied under Tommaso Minardi. Among Rossi-Scotti's masterworks are: Perrone a San Martino; Ultimi ora; and Una Ninfa nei boschi. The latter painting was awarded a silver medal all' International Exposition of Nice, and a gold medal at the Umbrian Exposition. He made copies of the Pinturicchio frescoes in the Borgia Apartments; these were commissioned by the Kensington Museum. In 1894, he made a reproduction of the frescoes in the Sala del Cambio in Perugia for that museum. In 1880 he displayed several paintings in the Exposition of Turin: Carica delle guide a Mazambano (Battle of Solferino); Saroia!; Last Hour, Ulans of Bavaria repelled at Villafranca (Battle of Custoza) Captain Roberto Perrone defends the Belvedere at the Battle of Custoza (1866). His grandiose military paintings garnered him commissions from the royal family.

In 1881 at Milan, Rossi-Scotti exhibited: Ricordi militari; and at the same exhibition in 1883: Silvia e Satiro, Tasso, Aminta; and La Ninfa dei boschi. In the 1883 Mostra of Rome, he displayed: Il colonnello Bolegno ferito nel caricare alla testa del 14° reggimento fanteria nella giornata di San Martino, e che trasportato dal suo cavallo cadde morto su un'altura di Roccoletto. Rossi-Scotti was named to many National Academies. He had been a member since the late 1880s of the Artists' society, based in Rome, of In Artes Libertas.

As a young painter in Rome, Rossi-Scotti had his studio on Via Margutta, but once he had gained prominence and success, he was granted the title of Count of Montepetriolo, and bought a medieval castle outside Perugia, and it was transformed into a villa. He died in Rome on 23 December 1926.
