= Giacinto Boccanera =

Italian painter (1666–1746)

Giacinto Boccanera (1666–1746) was a painter from the Papal States.

== Life and work ==
He was born in Leonessa March 11, 1666. Probably still very young, he moved to Rome where he had as a master of painting Giacinto Brandi. At the current state of knowledge we do not know in which year he settled in Perugia, probably before 1717, the date of his first remaining work. Certainly in Perugia he did all his activity; here, among other things, he married and his sons were born. He was elected director of the Academy of Fine Arts and was still in office in 1737, when the institute was closed by order of the authorities. He died in Perugia on March 17, 1746.

One of his earliest signed works, a study (1689) for an altarpiece for the cathedral of Città della Pieve. He moved to Perugia circa 1714, to become director of the local Academy of Fine Arts. Cristoforo Gasperi and Carlo Speridone Mariotti served as his apprentice in the 1730s.

An Adoration of the Magi in the church of Santa Maria di Colle, signed and dated 1717, is the earliest of Boccanera's works presently known. It is marked by a casual eclecticism absent from works features of his master Giacinto Brandi as well as in Venetian style of Francesco Trevisani. One of two altarpieces Boccanera painted for San Bernardo (current Intendenza di Finanza of Perugia) is dated 1714. Among the six paintings representing the patron saints of Perugia, destined for the chapel of the town hall and today held in storage by the Pinacoteca, the Saints Filino and Gratiniano show features that were not characteristic of Perugino Pietro Montanini. In the same warehouse was the Martyrdom of St. Giuliana, while in the church of Santo Spirito was the Baptism of the Emperor Constantius, dated 1731.

Two ovals with saints adorn an altar of the church of Santa Teresa degli Scalzi. His last documented works were the frescoes in the church of San Filippo, made in 1735 (the ornaments were made by P. Brizi), in which the influence of Brandi is evident. So almost at the end of his career's trajectory, he returned to recall the intrepid "attitudes" in vogue fifty years earlier in the circle of Brandi, interpreting them with that license and overabundance that would displease "classicist" Orsini.

Among the other Perugian Boccanera's paintings partly dispersed today, the sources recall: Last Supper in the old seminary, four paintings depicting the Martyrdom of Saint Lorence, the Samaritan Woman, the Martyrdom of Saint Stephen, and the Lot's drunkenness; furthermore, some decorations in the oratory of the Confraternity of the Saints Florence and Simon, and others in the noble apartment of the Donini building.
