= Vincenzo Danti =

Italian sculptor (1530-1576)

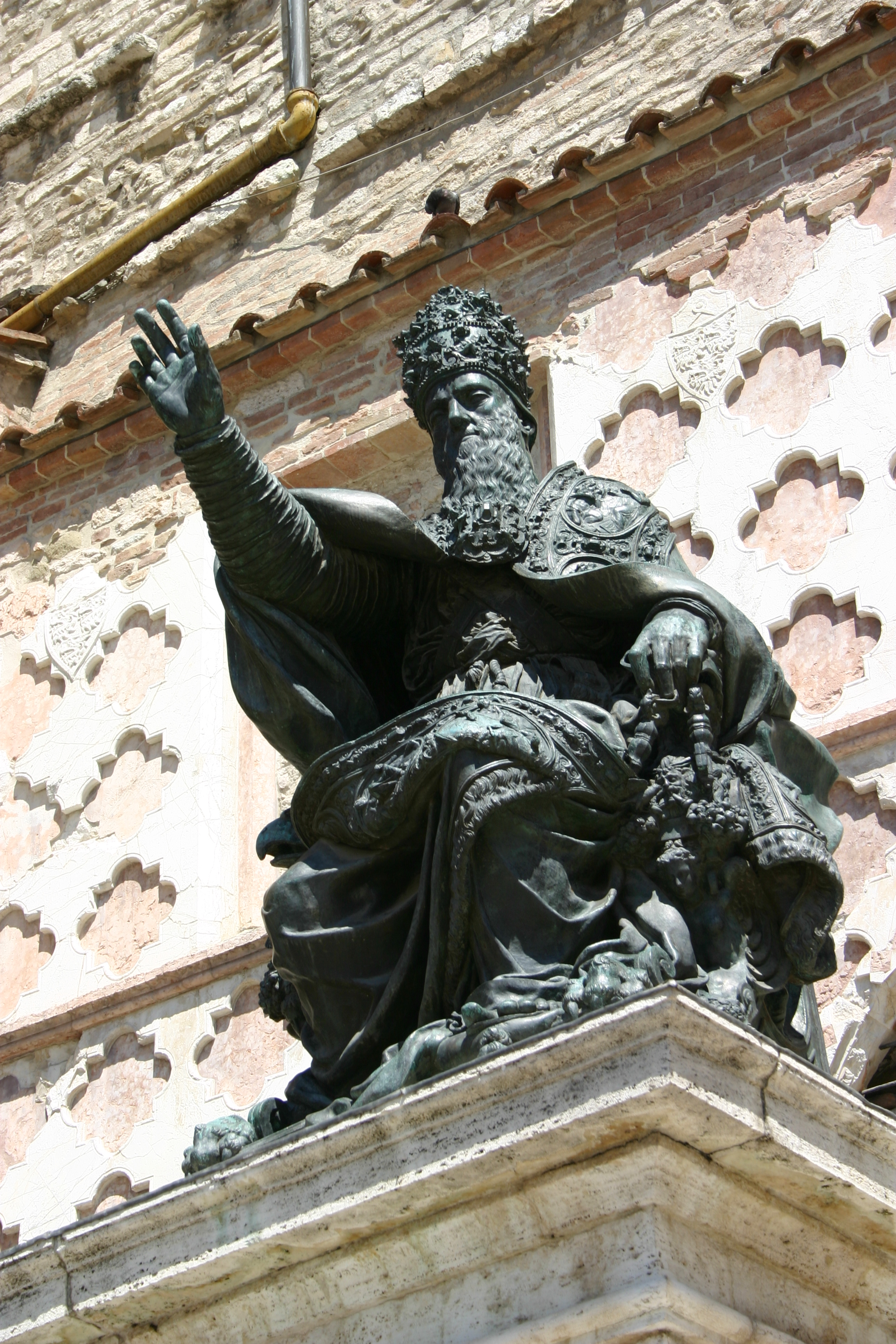
Pope Julius III by Danti

Vincenzo Danti (1530 – 26 May 1576) was an Italian Renaissance sculptor from Perugia.

His father was an architect and goldsmith, and Vincenzo developed an interest in drawing and goldsmithing. In 1545 he went to Rome to study sculpture and in 1553 he managed to secure a commission for a bronze statue of Pope Julius III which was placed outside Perugia Cathedral. In 1557 he went to Florence. In 1559 he made a bronze relief depicting Moses and the Brazen Serpent. This was influenced by bronze reliefs by Donatello. It is cast in low relief and is not finished to a very high degree, but is not non finito either.

Although the competition in 1560 for the Neptune fountain was mainly between the two more established sculptors, Bartolomeo Ammanati and Cellini, Danti also tried to prove his worth by competing. In 1561 he carved Honour Triumphs over Falsehood, a statue 'in the round' - interesting to view from all angles. The marble for this statue was bought for him by his patron Danti Sforza Almeni for him to prove his skill. The statue was notable for the fact that it was carved from a single block of marble, something that took great skill to do.

In 1567 he started writing a book about rules of order and proportion in architecture. He did intend to write fifteen of these but only did one. In 1569–71 he produced what is probably his most famous work, The Beheading of St John the Baptist. This is positioned above the bronze doors of the south entrance of the Battistero di San Giovanni in Florence. This bronze group shows the Baptist kneeling in the middle waiting for the sword of the executioner on the right, with Salome on the left. This is in a mannerist style with the bodies and limbs elongated, and bizarre folds in the material. The poses of all are very elegant.

In 1568-72 he carried on Michelangelo's new tradition of depicting modern men in ancient armour (from the Medici Chapel), when he carved Cosimo I as Augustus. This was commissioned for the Uffizi in Florence where it remained until replaced by another statue of Cosimo (a member of the powerful Medici family) by Giambologna. In 1575 he returned to Perugia where he died in 1576.

Girolamo Danti, a brother of Vincenzo, was a painter; he frescoed a chapel including a Resurrection in the ceiling in the church of San Francesco al Prato of Perugia. In Gubbio, he painted a Nativity of the Virgin for the church of San Domenico. He also painted in Rome for the Gallery of Maps, under the supervision of his brother Ignazio Danti.
