= Perugia Cathedral =

Catholic cathedral in Perugia, Umbria, Italy

Perugia Cathedral Cattedrale Metropolitana di San Lorenzo
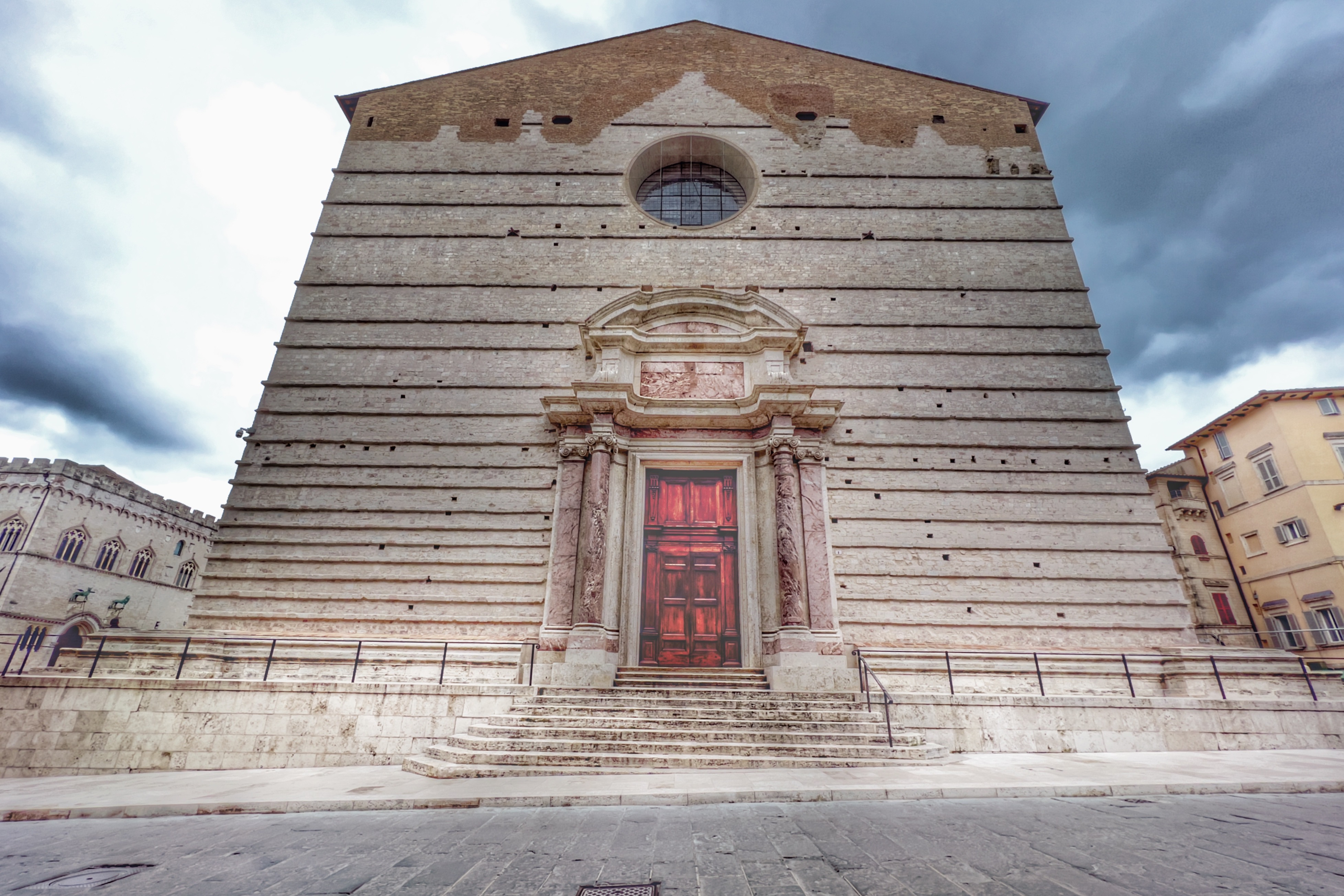
- Façade in 2022

Religion
- Affiliation: Roman Catholic
- Province: Archdiocese of Perugia
- Year consecrated: 1587

Location
- Location: Perugia, Italy
- Interactive map of Perugia Cathedral; Cattedrale Metropolitana di San Lorenzo
- Coordinates: 43.112685°N 12.389209°E

Architecture
- Architect: Fra Bevignate
- Type: Hallenkirche
- Style: Gothic
- Groundbreaking: 1345
- Completed: 1490
- Materials: marble, travertine

Website
- www.cattedrale.perugia.it

Perugia Cathedral (Italian: Duomo di Perugia), officially the Metropolitan Cathedral of St. Lawrence (Cattedrale Metropolitana di San Lorenzo), is a Roman Catholic cathedral in Perugia, Umbria, central Italy, dedicated to Saint Lawrence. Formerly the seat of the bishops and archbishops of Perugia, it has been since 1986 the archiepiscopal seat of the Archdiocese of Perugia-Città della Pieve

== History ==
From the establishment of the bishopric, a cathedral existed in Perugia in different locations, until, in 936–1060, a new edifice, corresponding to the transept of the present cathedral, was built here. The current cathedral, dedicated from the beginning as the Cathedral of San Lorenzo and Sant'Ercolano dates from a project of 1300 by Fra Bevignate that was initiated in 1345 and completed in 1490. The external decoration in white and pink marble lozenges (adapted from Arezzo Cathedral) was never completed; a trial section can still be seen on the main façade.

== Overview ==
=== Exterior ===
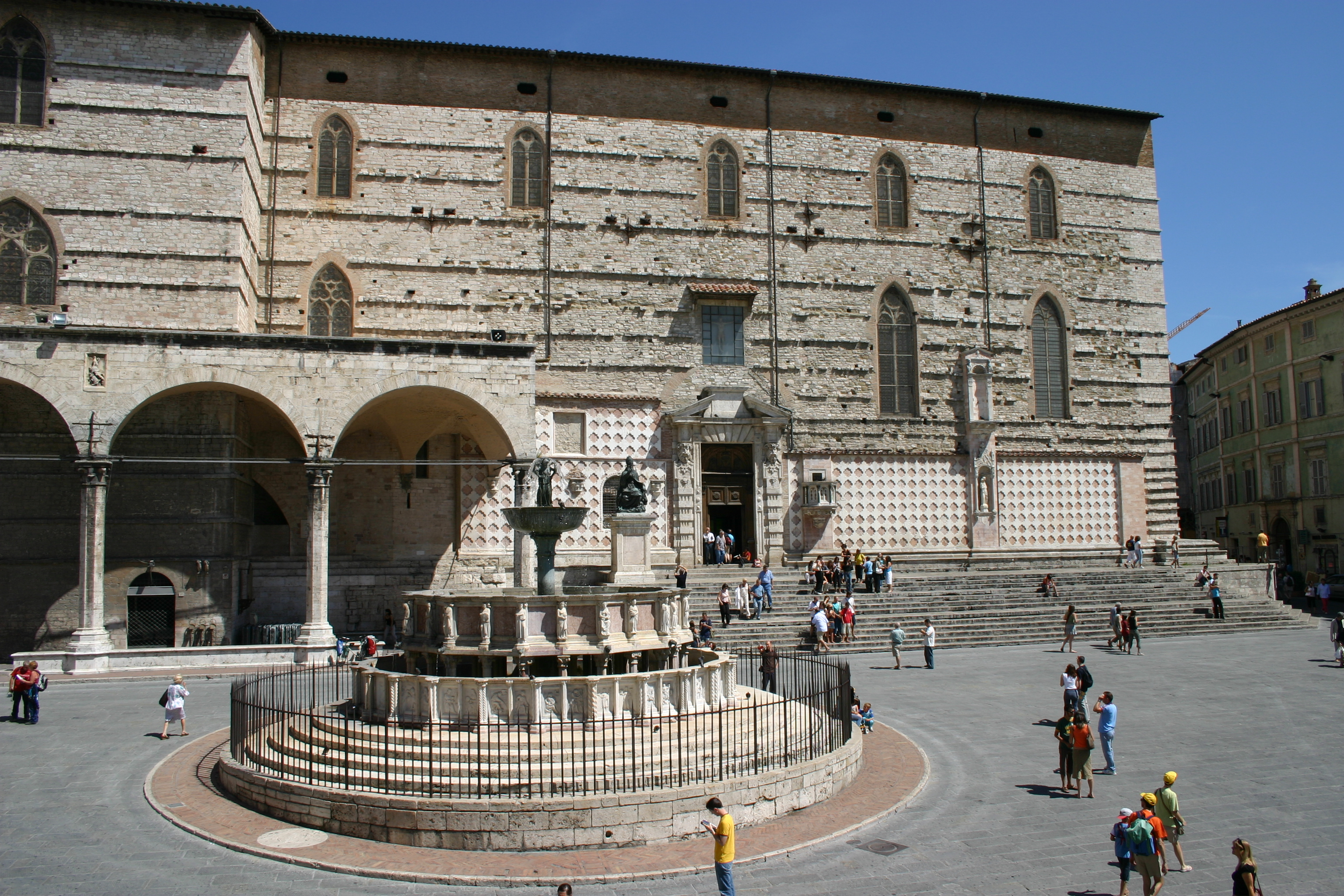
The cathedral's south wall with the Loggia di Braccio on the left and the Fontana Maggiore in the foreground.

Unlike most cathedrals, the cathedral of Perugia has its flank on the city's main square, facing the Fontana Maggiore and the Palazzo dei Priori. This side is characterized by the Loggia di Braccio commissioned by Braccio da Montone (1423), an early Renaissance structure attributed to Fioravante Fioravanti from Bologna. It formerly formed part of the Palazzo del Podestà, which burned in 1534. Under it a section of Roman wall and the basement of the old campanile can be seen. It houses also the Pietra della Giustizia ("Justice Stone") bearing a 1234 inscription by which the commune announced that all the public debt had been repaid. Also on this side is a statue of Pope Julius III by Vincenzo Danti (1555); Julius was a hero to Perugia for having restored the local magistrature, which had been suppressed by Paul III. Until the end of the nineteenth century the statue was more prominently placed in the Piazza Danti (square), but it was repositioned to the side in order to make way for the electric tram which was inaugurated in 1899. In the unfinished wall is a portal designed by Galeazzo Alessi (1568), a pulpit composed of ancient fragments and Cosmatesque mosaics, from which Saint Bernardino of Siena preached in 1425 and 1427 and a wooden Crucifix by Polidoro Ciburri (1540).

The main façade faces the smaller Piazza Danti; in it is a baroque portal designed by Pietro Carattoli in 1729. The sturdy campanile was constructed in 1606–1612.

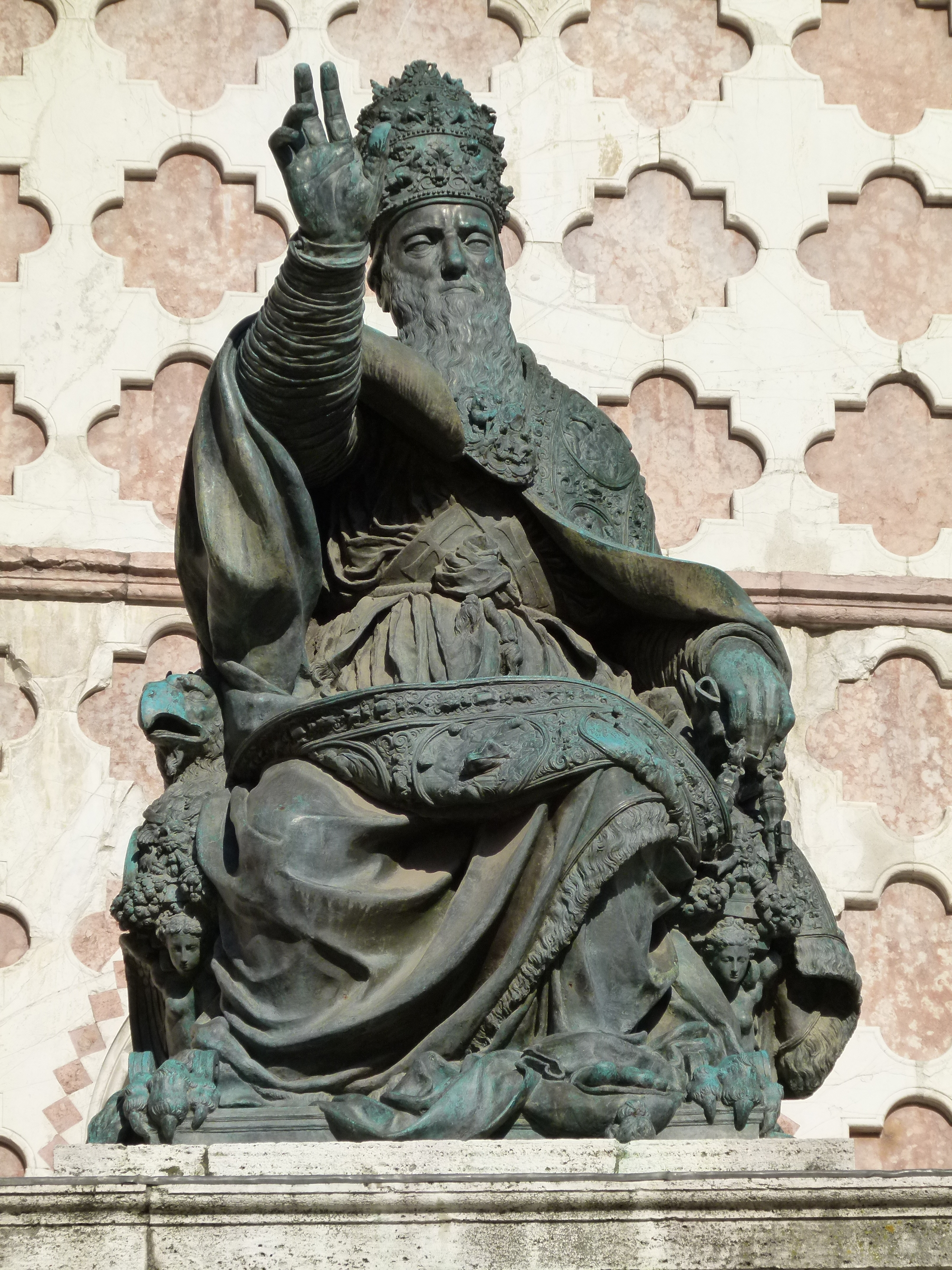
Statua di Giulio III.

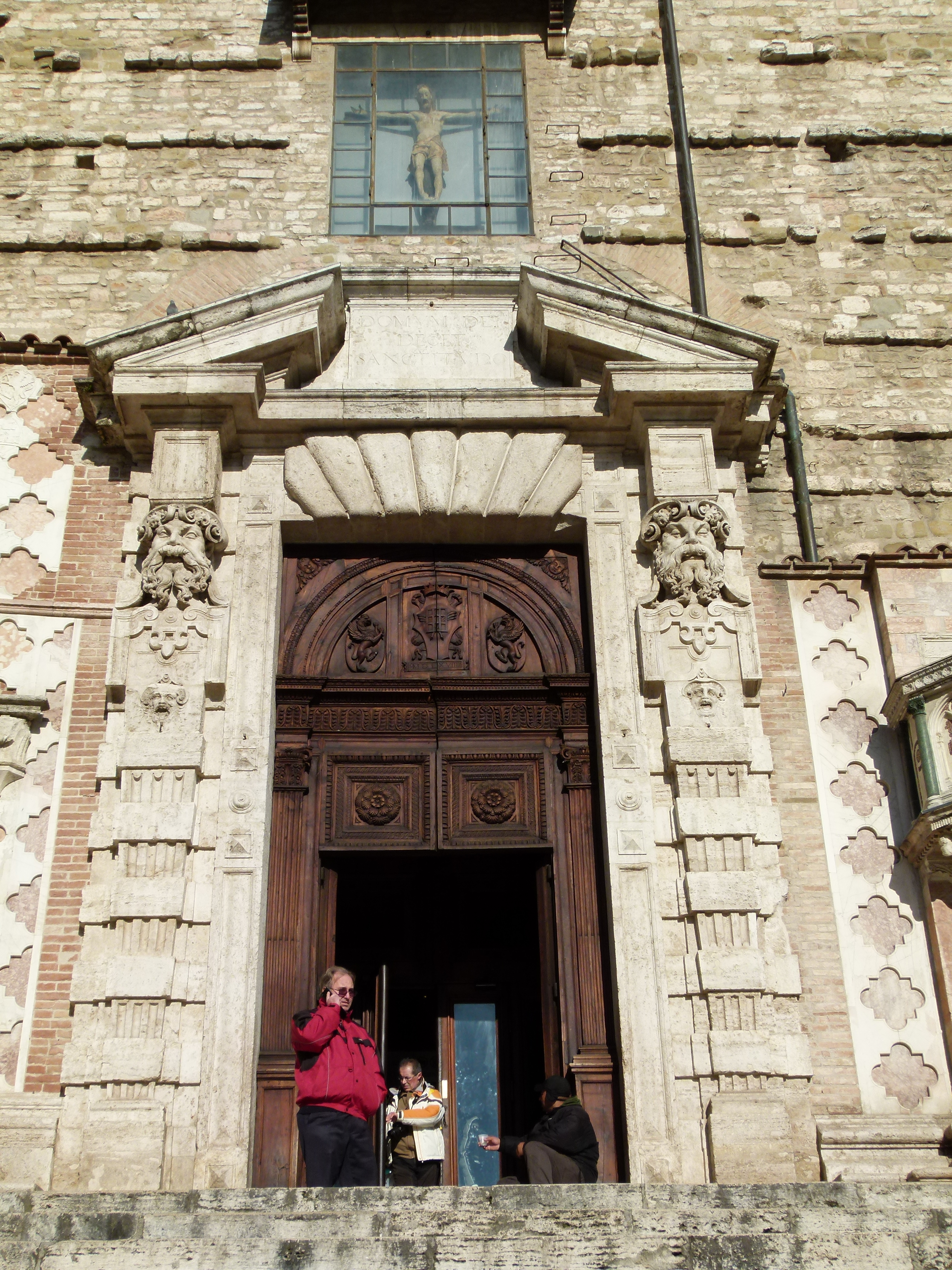
Portale laterale.

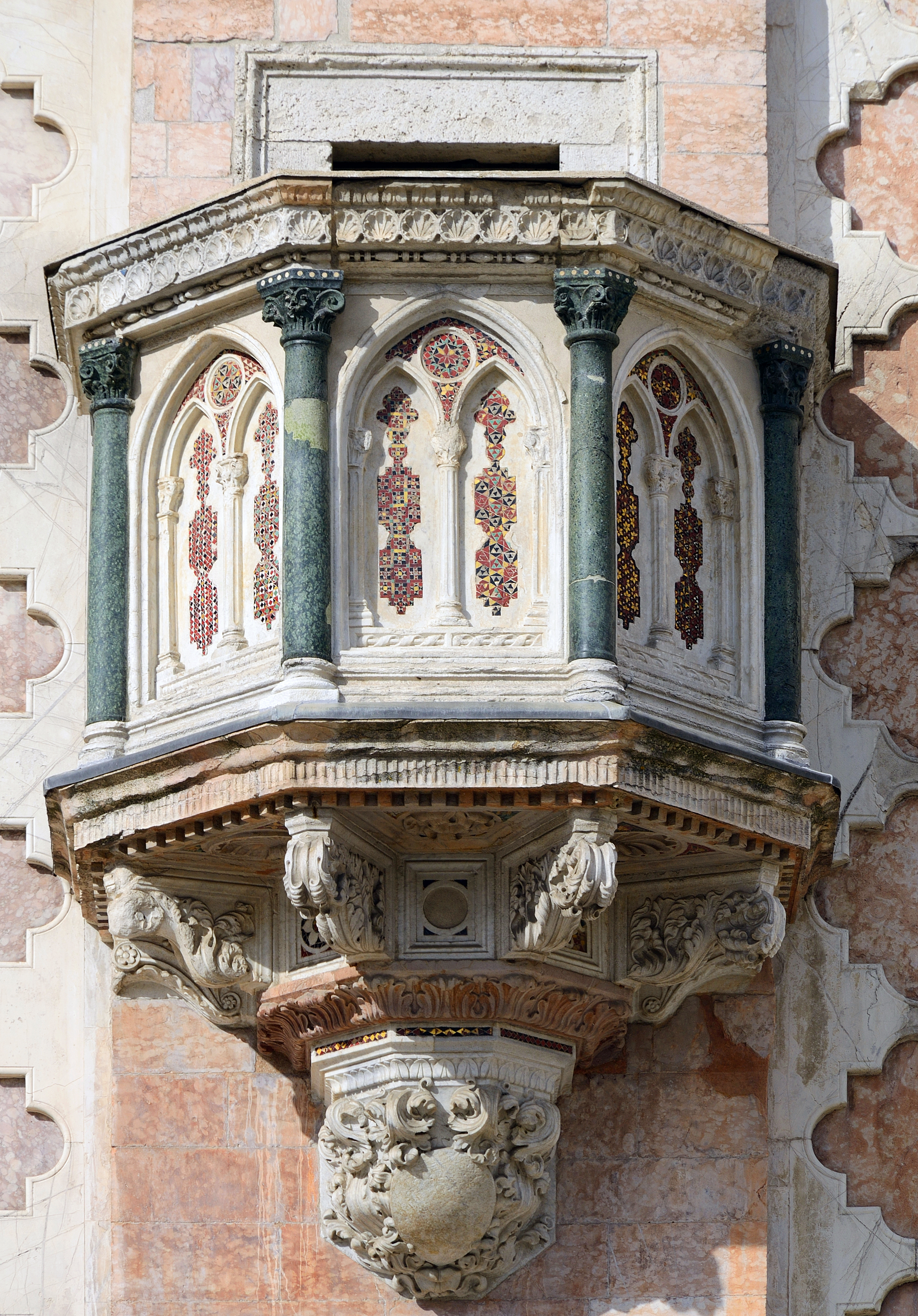
Pulpito di San Bernardino.

=== Interior ===
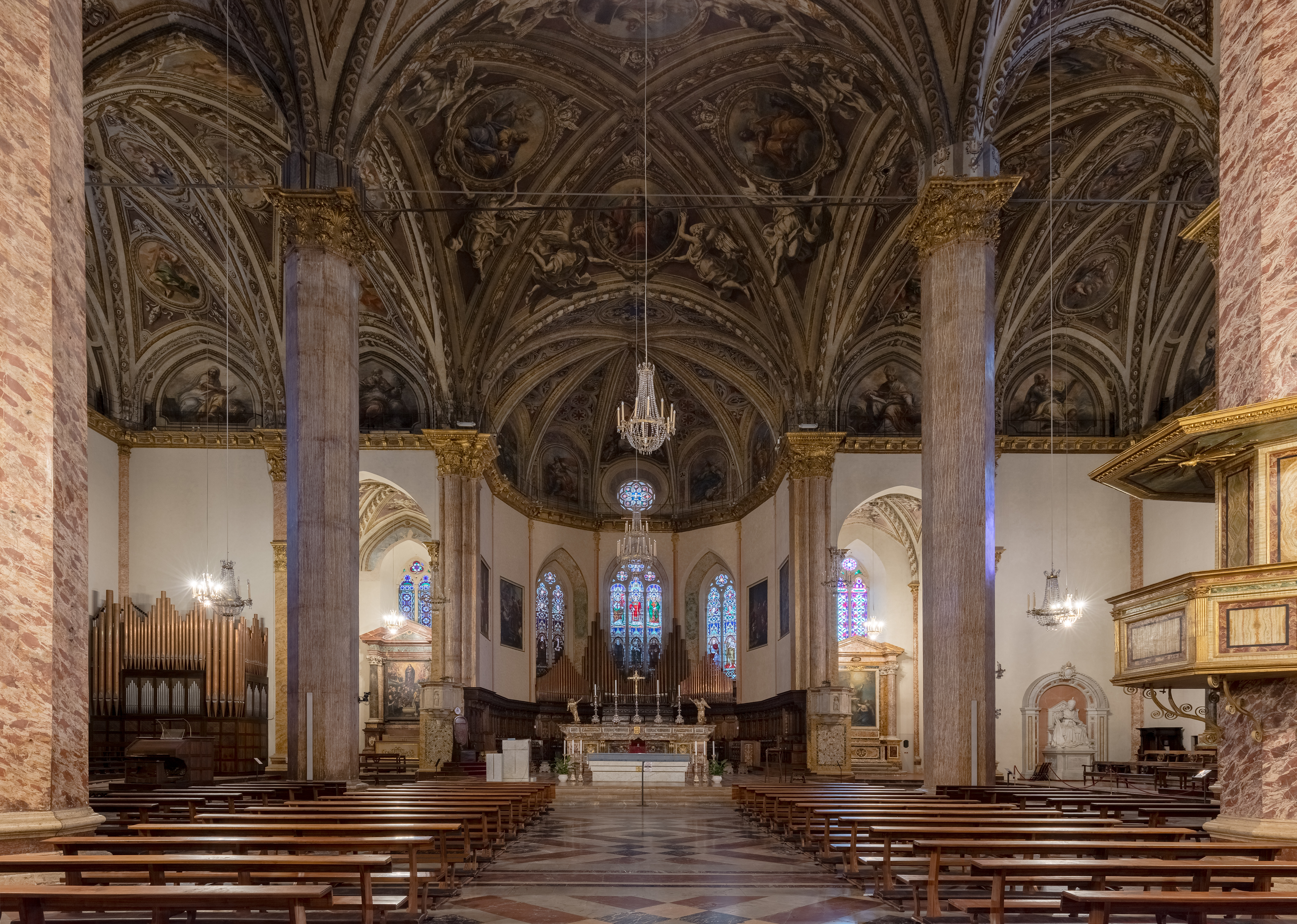
Interior

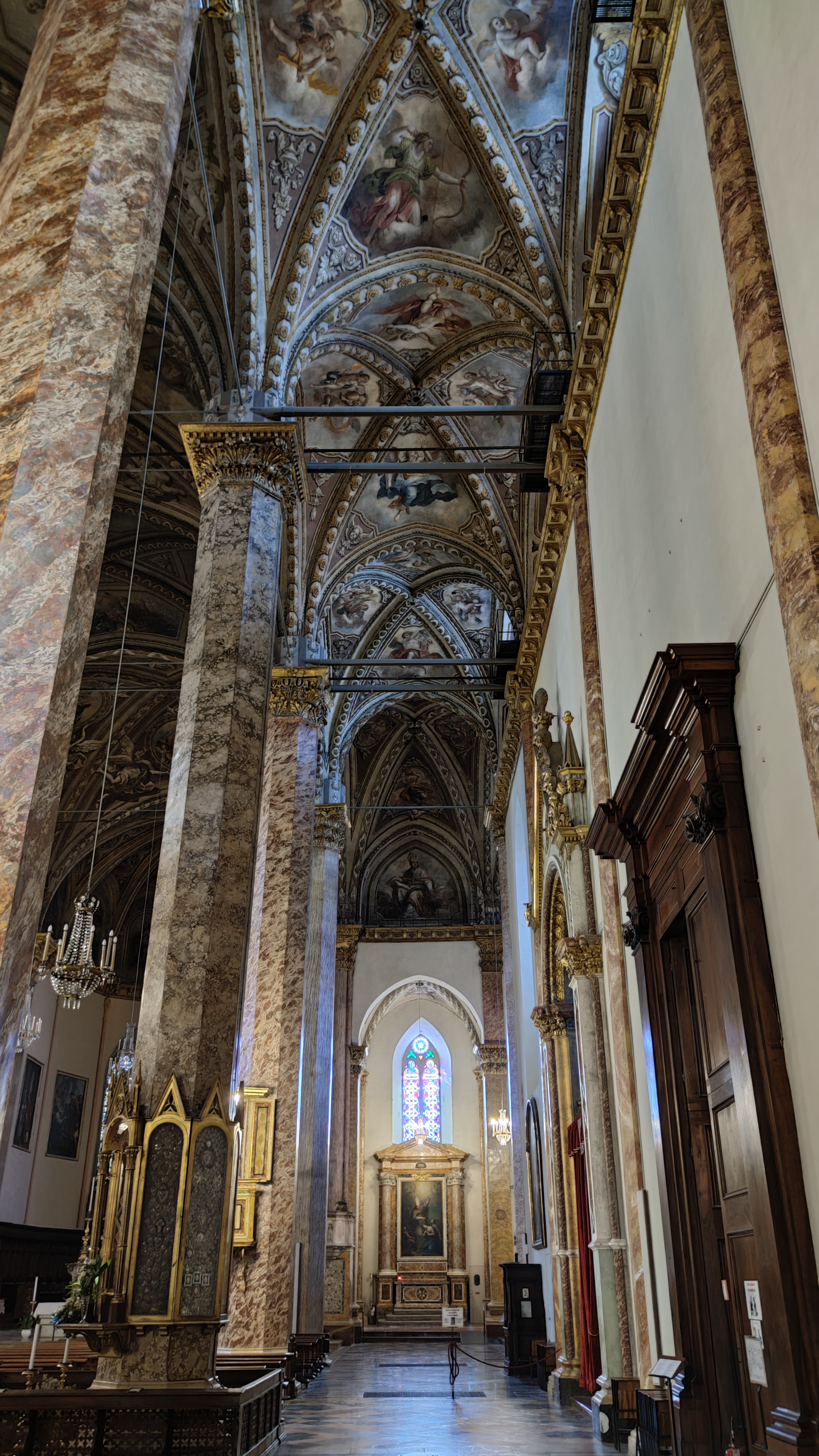
Interior

The interior is of the Chiesa a sala type, 68 m in length, with a nave and two aisles of the same height; the nave is twice as wide as the aisles. On the counterfaçade is the sarcophagus of bishop Giovanni Andrea Baglioni (died 1451), attributed to Urbano da Cortona.

The first chapel is dedicated to the Holy Ring, the relic of the wedding ring of the Holy Virgin, which was stolen from Chiusi in 1473. The chapel had once frescoes by Pinturicchio and a painting by Perugino, now in the museum of Caen. It also houses a reliquary by Bino di Pietro and Federico and Cesarino del Roscetto, considered amongst the masterworks of Italian Renaissance goldsmiths' work. Continuing on the side wall are the remains of an altar by Agostino di Duccio (1473), demolished in 1623.

Notable is the apse, with a wooden choir with intarsia by Giuliano da Maiano and Domenico del Tasso (1486–91), which was damaged by a fire in 1985. The right transept has an altarpiece by Giovanni Baglione (1609). Two small side doors lead to Oratory of St. Onofrio, built to house altarpiece with the same name by Luca Signorelli, now in the Cathedral Museum.

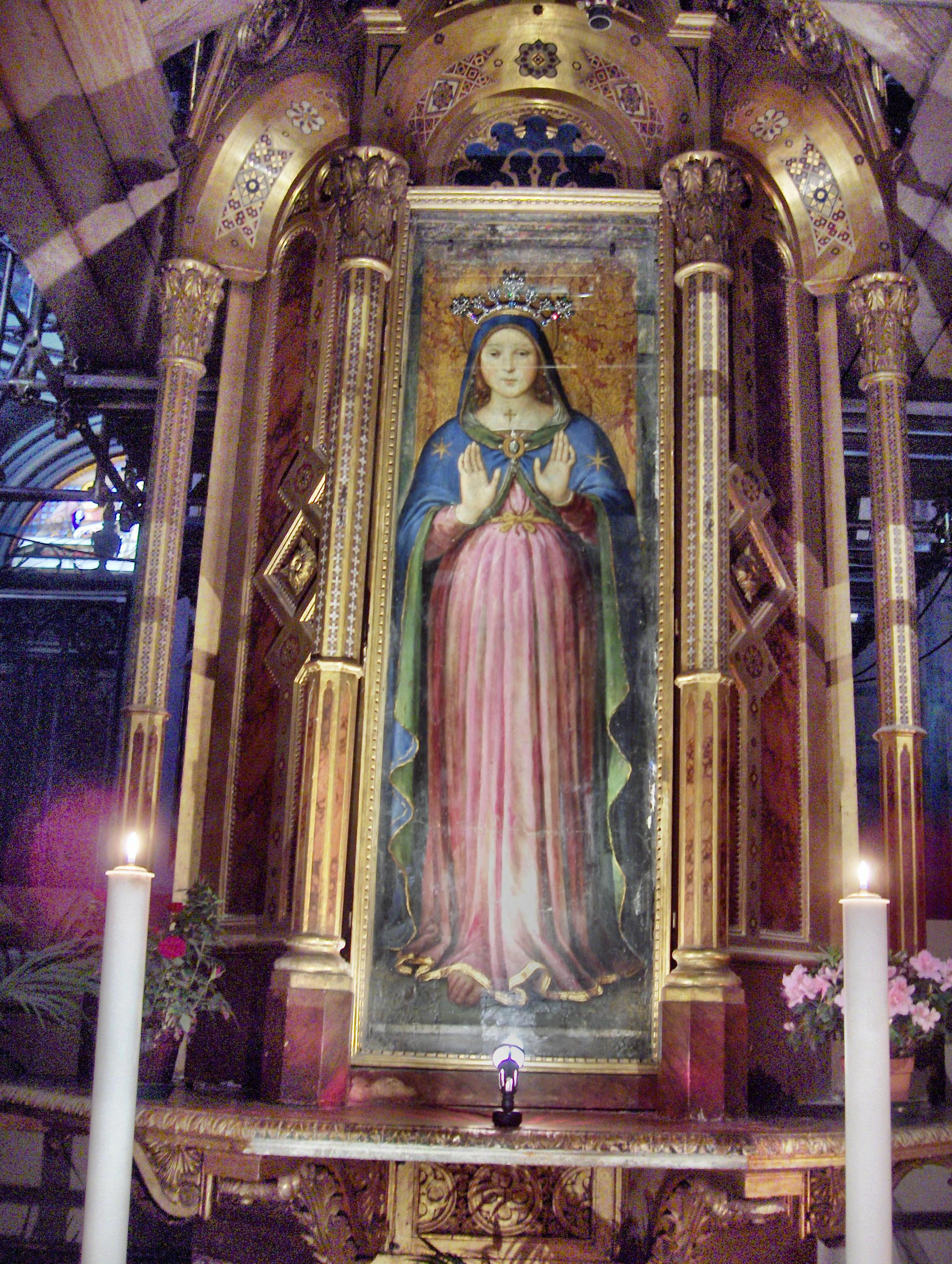
The Madonna delle Grazie, attributed to Giannicola di Paolo

On the right nave is the Sacrament Chapel, designed by Alessi (1576), with an altarpiece of the Pentecost by Cesare Nebbia (1563); a marble sarcophagus contains the remains of Pope Martin IV, who died at Perugia in 1285, and relics of Innocent III and Urban IV. The next bay leads to the Baptistery Chapel, with a Renaissance perspective view in marble by Pietro di Paolo di Andrea da Como (1477). In front of it, is the venerated image of the Madonna delle Grazie, by Giannicola di Paolo, a follower of Perugino. The right nave ends with the Chapel of St. Bernardino, enclosed by a 15th-century railing. Its altar houses the most important artwork of the church, a Deposition from the Cross by Federico Barocci (1567–1569).

=== Sacristy ===
The sacristy was entirely frescoed by Gian Antonio Pandolfi starting from 1573. The cloister houses several architectonic and sculpture fragments, including a head attributed to Giovanni Pisano and a Renaissance bust of the Redeemer.

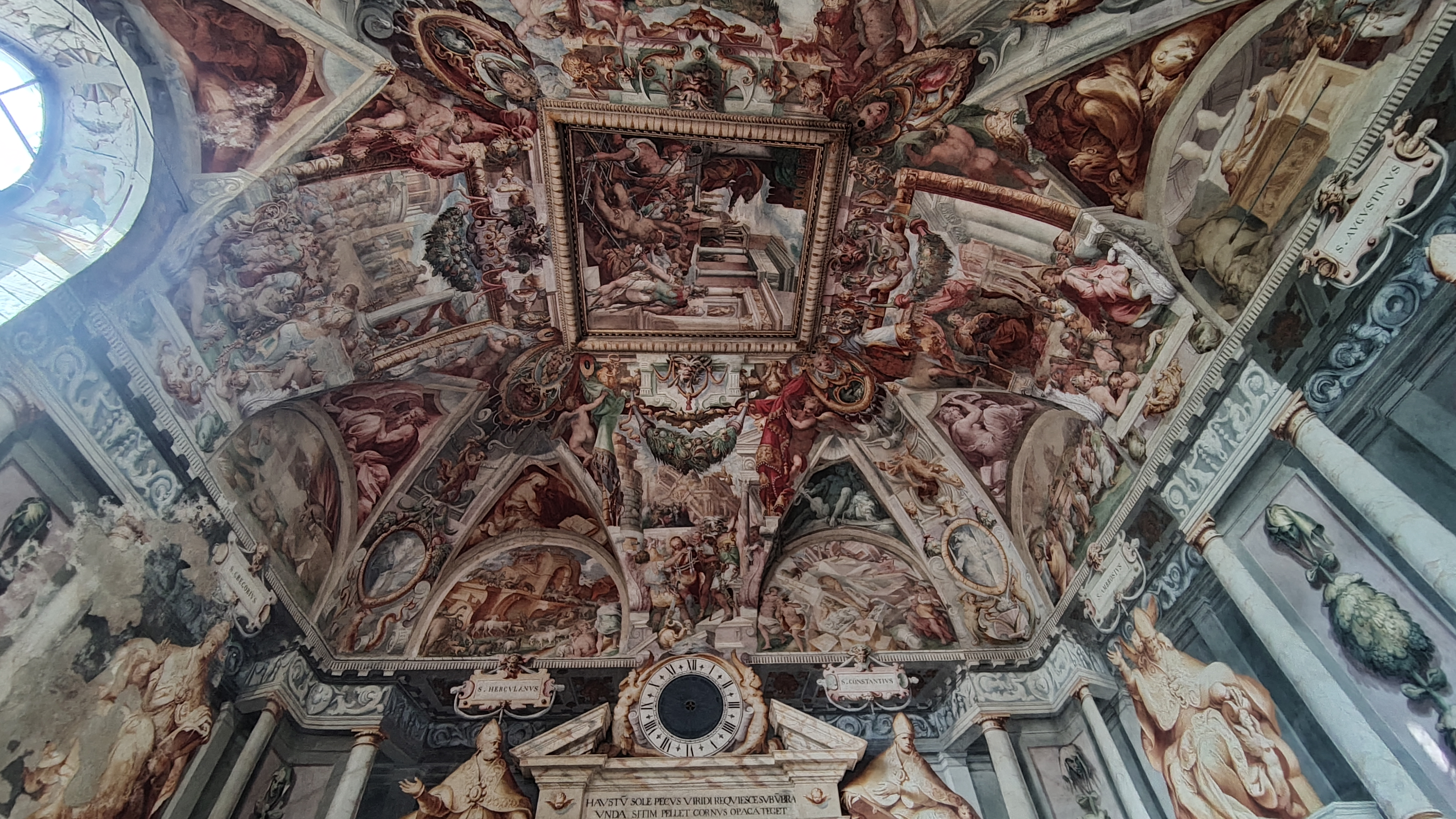
The sacristy

== Cathedral Museum ==
The museum is home to a triptych by Meo da Siena, a Madonna by Andrea Vanni and a triptych by Agnolo Gaddi, as well as the notable altarpiece by Signorelli. It has a Marriage of the Virgin (1815) by Carlo Labruzzi. It has also numerous precious manuscripts, some from the 10th century.

Next to it, the Sala del Dottorato has frescoes portraying Pope John XXII between the emperors Charles IV and Sigismund.
