= Timeline of Siena =

The following is a timeline of the history of the city of Siena, Tuscany, Italy.

== Prior to 15th century ==
- 1st C. CE – Saena Julia founded by Romans.
- 1205 – Palazzo Tolomei built (approximate date).
- 1233 - "The people again rose against the nobles in the hope of ousting them entirely from office."
- 1240 – University of Siena established.
- 1248 - Plague.
- 1255
  - Gran Tavola bank founded.
  - Basilica of San Francesco built.
- 1260 – Battle of Montaperti.
- 1263 – Siena Cathedral built.
- 1265 – Basilica of San Domenico built.
- 1287 – Noveschi in power.
- 1308 – Palazzo Pubblico built.
- 1328 – Famine.
- 1348
  - Black Death plague.
  - Torre del Mangia built.
- 1349 - Piazza del Campo paved in fishbone-patterned red brick.
- 1355 - Arrival of Charles IV, Holy Roman Emperor in Siena
- 1360 – Public clock installed.

== 15th century ==
- 1419 - Fonte Gaia built.
- 1423 - Council of Siena begins.
- 1438 - Loggia della Mercanzia built (approximate date).
- 1459 – Palazzo Marsili rebuilt.
- 1462 – Loggia del Papa erected.
- 1463 – Palazzo Piccolomini-delle Papesse built.
- 1472
  - Monte dei Paschi di Siena founded.
  - Palazzo Spannocchi built (approximate date).
- 1478 - The Pazzi conspiracy led to war a war lasting to 1480.
- 1482 & 1483 - Riots.
- 1484 – Printing press in operation.
- 1490 – Basilica dell'Osservanza built (approximate date).
- 1495
  - Palazzo delle Papesse completed (approximate date).
  - Piccolomini Library built (approximate date).

== 16th–18th centuries ==
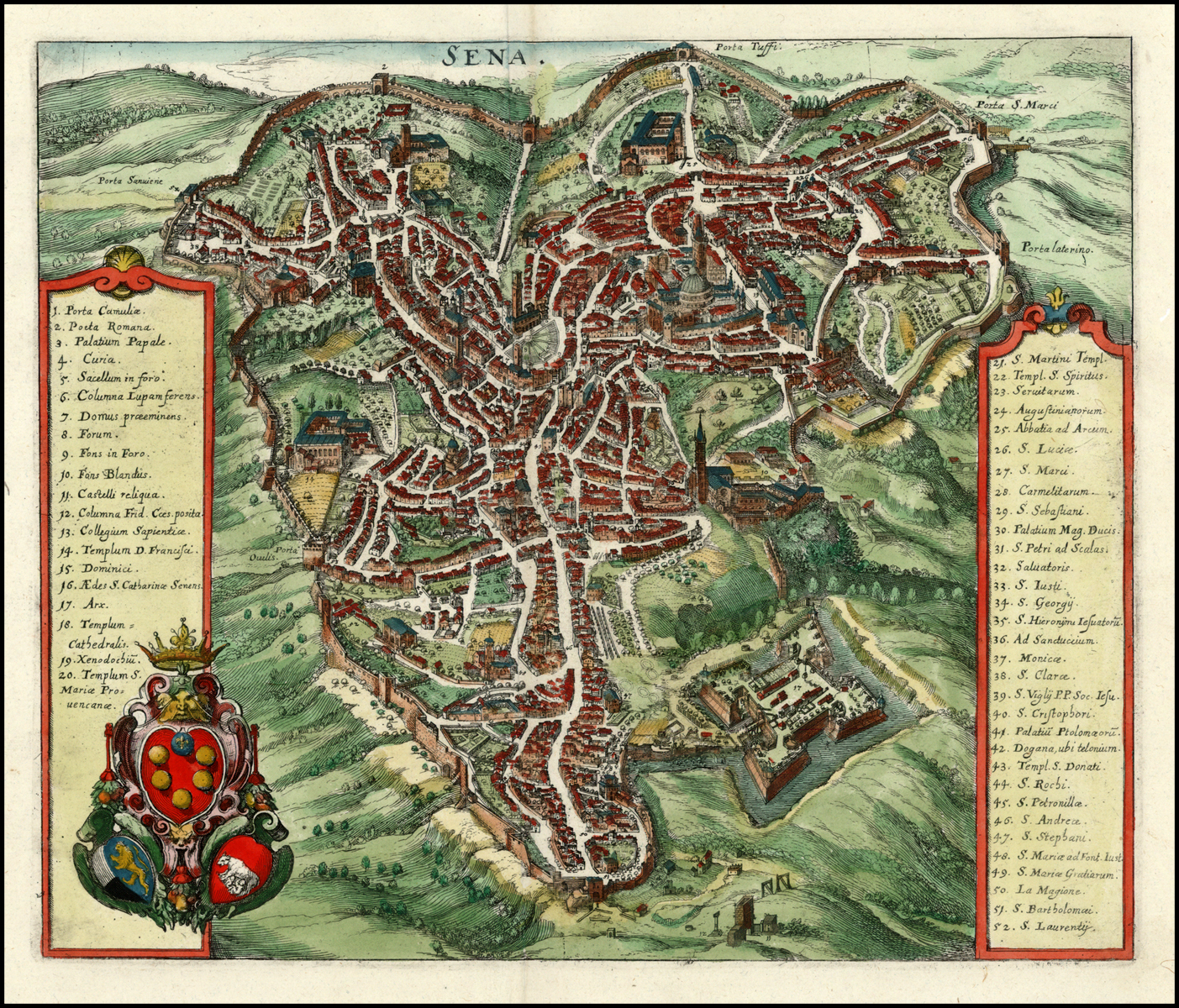
Map of Siena, 1640

- 1504 – Santo Spirito renovated.
- 1506 – Palazzo Chigi-Saracini renovated.
- 1508 – Palazzo del Magnifico built.
- 1520 – Palazzo Bichi built (approximate date).
- 1527 – Accademia degli Intronati founded (approximate date).
- 1533 – Santa Maria dei Servi consecrated.
- 1554 – Battle of Marciano.
- 1555 – Republic of Siena surrenders to Spain; Siena ceded to Duchy of Florence.
- 1604 – Porta Camollia rebuilt.
- 1613 – San Martino renovated.
- 1656 – Palio di Siena horse race begins.
- 1691 – Accademia dei Fisiocritici founded.
- 1729 – Consolidation of districts; elimination of contrade Gallo, Leone, Orso, Quercia, Spadaforte, and Vipera.

== 19th century ==
- 1816
  - Fine Arts Institution founded.
  - The natural history museum of the Royal Academy of the Physiocritics founded.
- 1843 – Cemetery of Misericordia established.
- 1848 – Palazzo Buonsignori restored.
- 1854 – Palazzo del Capitano restored.
- 1856 – Orto Botanico dell'Università di Siena laid out.
- 1858 – Municipal Archives established.
- 1865 – Empoli-Siena railway begins operating.
- 1871 – Mens Sana in Corpore Sano 1871 formed.
- 1897 – Population: 30,468.

== 20th century ==
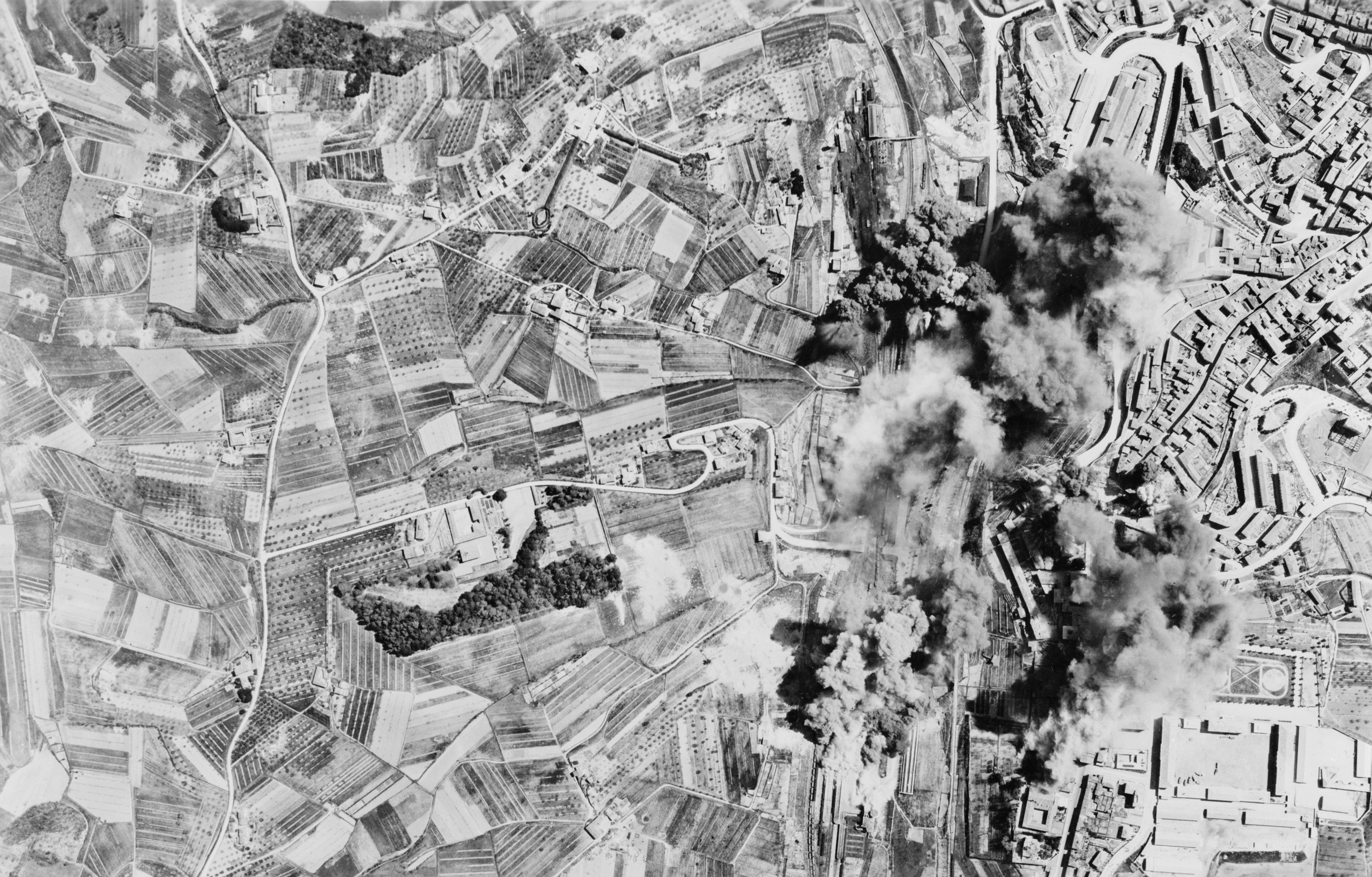
Allied bombing of Nazi railyard, Siena, c. 1944

- 1901 – Population: 25,539.
- 1904 – Società Studio e Divertimento formed.
- 1911 – Population: 41,673.
- 1923 – Stadio Artemio Franchi – Montepaschi Arena opens.
- 1932
  - Accademia Musicale Chigiana founded.
  - Pinacoteca Nazionale inaugurated.
- 1935 – Siena railway station opens.
- 1944 – Bombing by Allies.
- 1959 – Biblioteca Comunale degli Intronati (library) active.
- 1976 – Palasport Mens Sana arena opens.
- 1995 – Santa Maria della Scala museum opens.

== 21st century ==
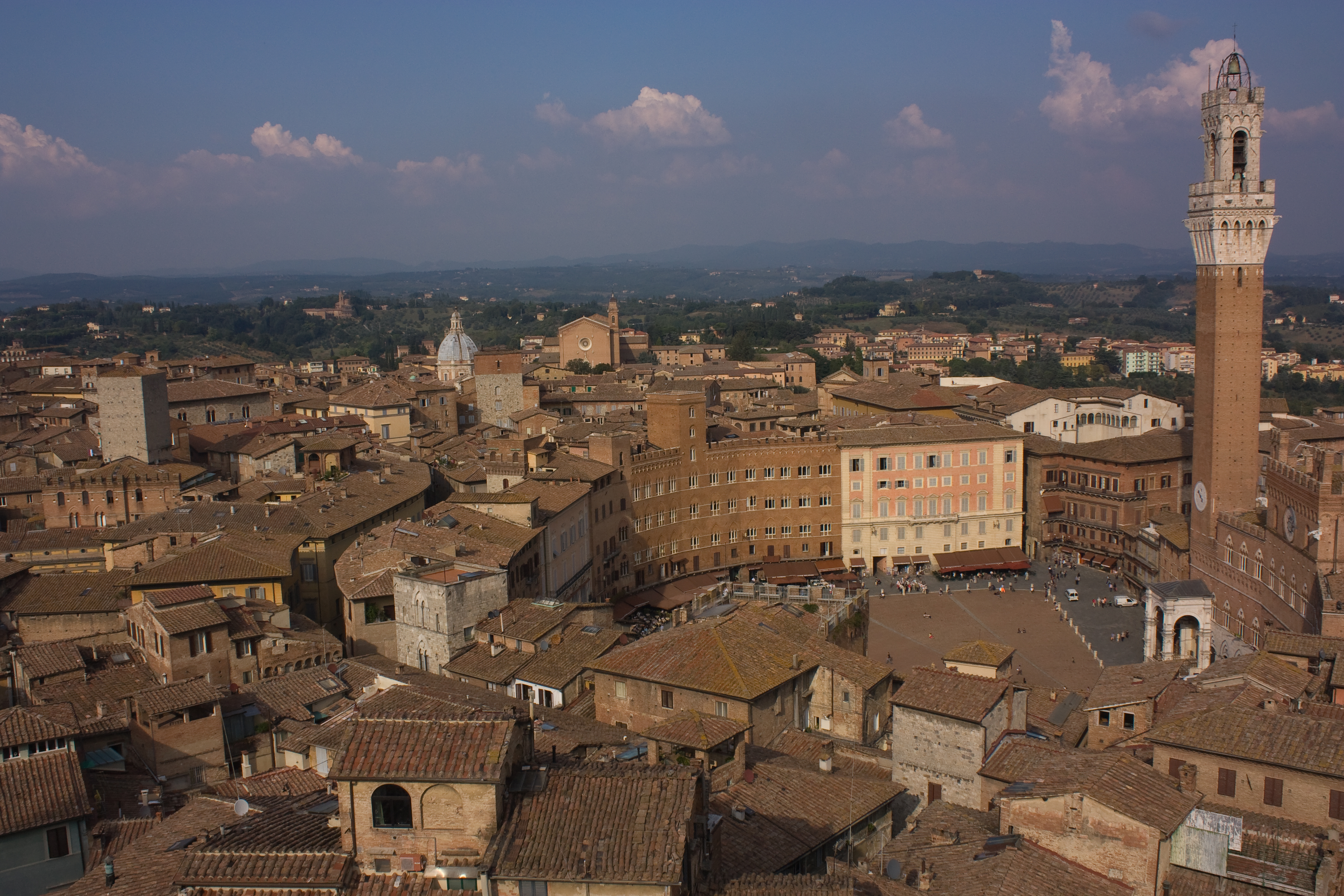
Siena, 2009

- 2003
  - Fondazione Musei Senesi established.
  - Siena–Ampugnano Airport renovated.

== See also ==
- Siena history
- History of Siena
- List of governors of Siena
- List of mayors of Siena
- Republic of Siena, 11th–16th centuries
- State Archives of Siena (state archives)

Other cities in the macroregion of Central Italy:^{(it)}

- Timeline of Ancona, Marche region
- Timeline of Arezzo, Tuscany region
- Timeline of Florence, Tuscany
- Timeline of Grosseto, Tuscany
- Timeline of Livorno, Tuscany
- Timeline of Lucca, Tuscany
- Timeline of Perugia, Umbria region
- Timeline of Pisa, Tuscany
- Timeline of Pistoia, Tuscany
- Timeline of Prato, Tuscany
- Timeline of Rome, Lazio region
