= Palazzo Piccolomini =

Palazzo Piccolomini may refer to:

- Palazzo Piccolomini, Pienza
- Palazzo Piccolomini, Siena
- Palazzo Piccolomini-Clementini
- Palazzo Chigi all Postierla, sometimes called the Chigi-Piccolomini or Piccolomini-Adami
