= Palazzo Marsili-Libelli =

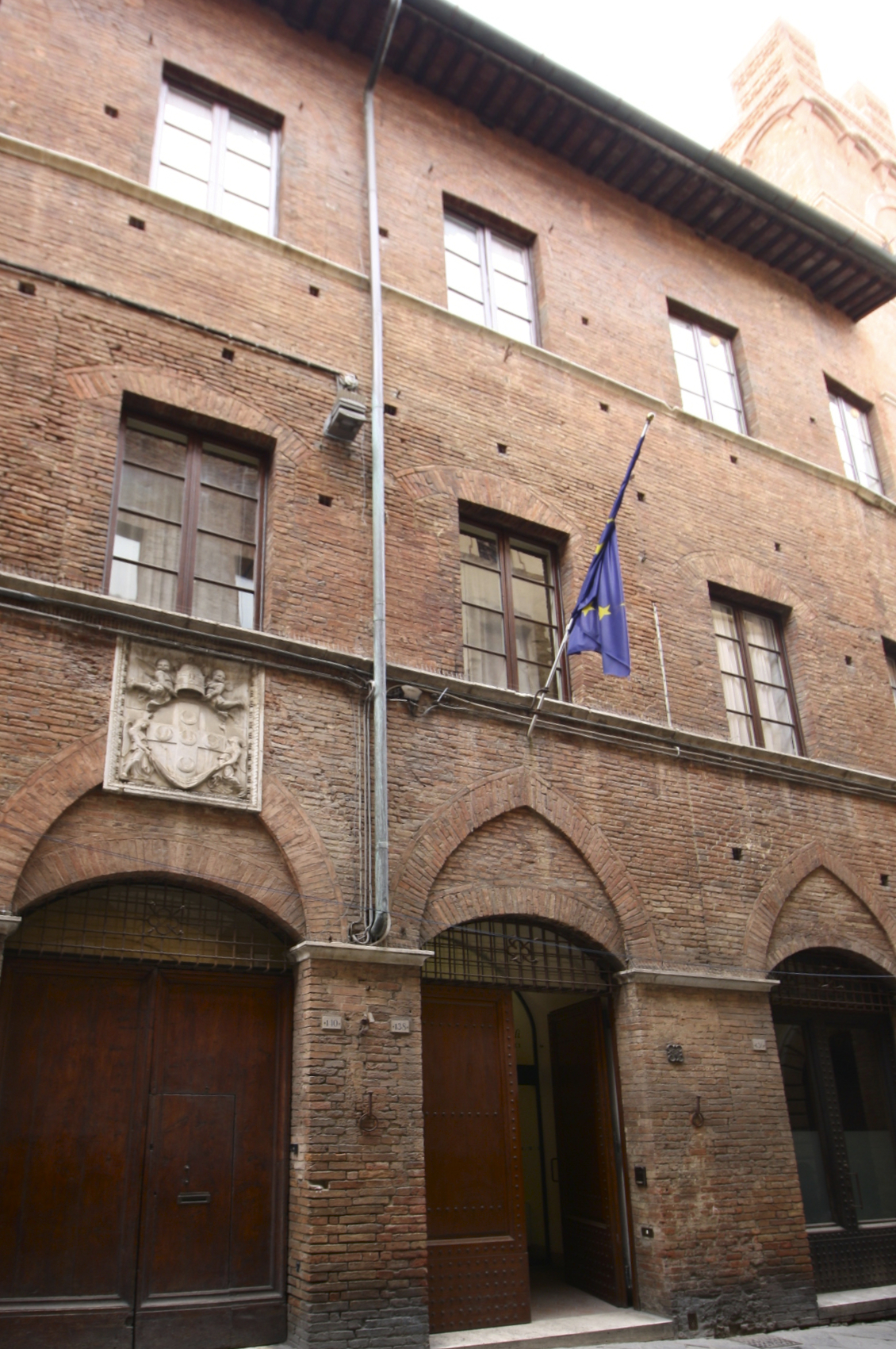
Palazzo Marsili-Libelli, Siena

The Palazzo Marsili Libelli is a Gothic style urban palace localized on Via di Città #136-142, in the Terzo di Città, in the city of Siena, region of Tuscany, Italy. The palace is adjacent to the taller Palazzo Marsili with a crenellated roofline and mullioned second and third story windows, and which stands at the corner of Via di Città and Via del Castoro.

== History ==
The palace was made of brick in Gothic style in the mid-15th century, when other palaces were already beginning to show the influence of Florentine Renaissance as evidenced, for example, in Siena by the Palazzo Piccolomini. The origins of the Piccolomini family were linked this house as is evidenced by the coat of arms of Pope Pius II placed over the central entry portal, sculpted by Urbano da Cortona. The coat of arms has two cherubs lofting a papal tiara above a shield held by struggling angels. The shield has five crescents on a cross (argent on a cross azure 5 crescents or).

The palace was owned after the Piccolomini by the Libelli (also known as Loli) family, then in 1730 by the Marsili Family. The pointed arches at street level with internal rounding are characteristic of Sienese Gothic. It is likely the windows in the higher floors were at one time not rectangular. The interior has a loggia-courtyard with columns. The second floor has a small chapel with a 17th-century altar with a painting attributed to Dionisio Montorselli.

In 2014, among the offices housed in the Palace were a post office and the offices of the Soprintendenza per i Beni Architettonici e per il Paesaggio per le province di Siena e Grosseto.
