= Oratory of Sant'Antonio da Padova, Siena =

Church building in Siena, Italy

Coordinates: 43.31456°N 11.328886°E

Oratory of Sant'Antonio da Padova
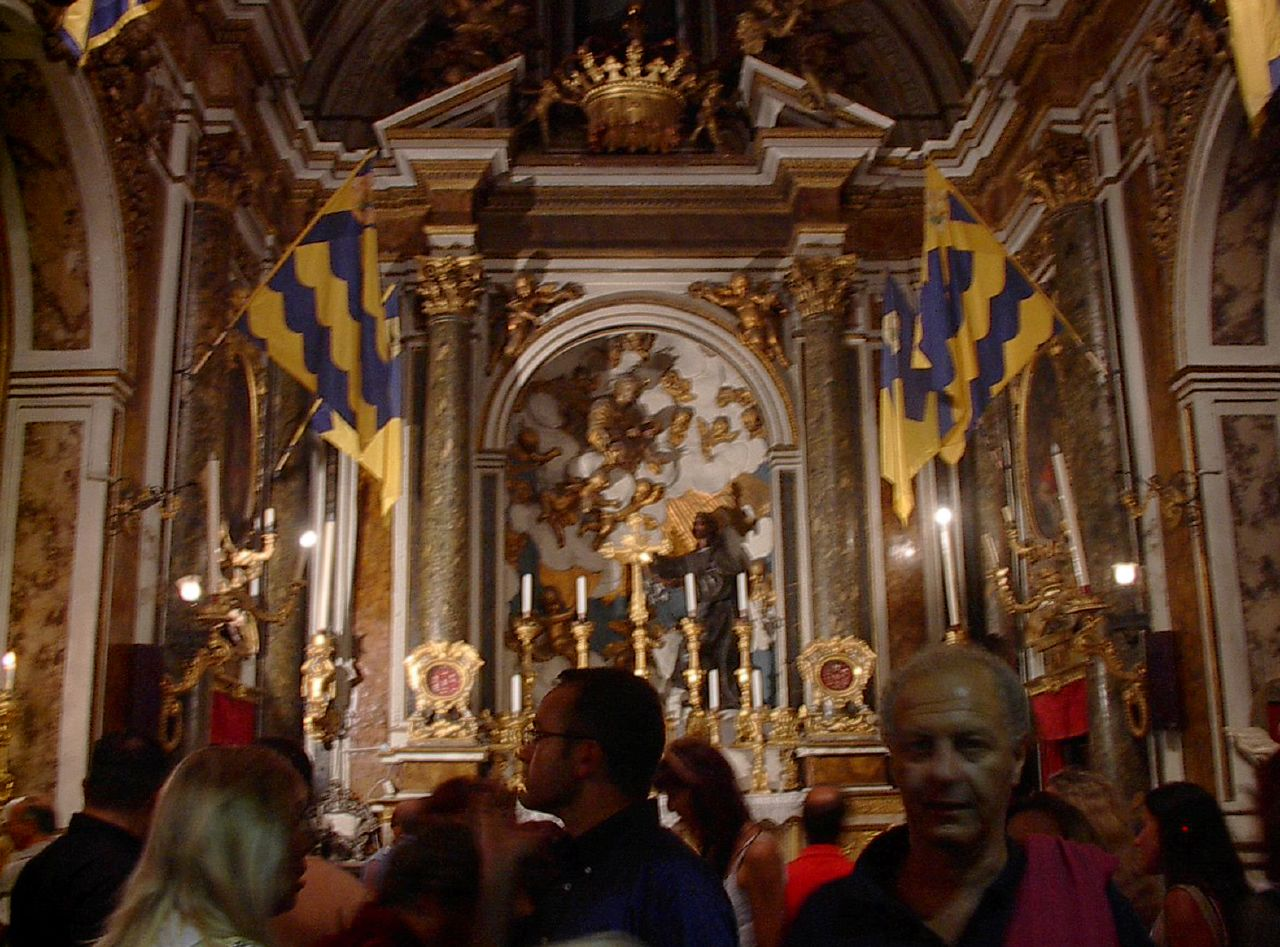
- Church interior

Religion
- Affiliation: Roman Catholic
- Year consecrated: 16 December 1685

Location
- Interactive map of Oratory of Sant'Antonio da Padova

Architecture
- Architect: Jacomo Franchini
- Style: Baroque
- Groundbreaking: 1681
- Completed: 1685

The Oratory of Sant'Antonio da Padova (St Anthony of Padua) is a small church on Via Tommaso Pendola (formerly Via delle Murella) in Siena, Italy. The oratory is property of the "Ward of the Turtle" or Contrada della Tartuca, and now commonly called Sant'Antonio alle Murella. Siena also has a separate church of Sant'Antonio da Padova located elsewhere in the city in the Contrada della Civetta.

In the second half of the 17th century, inhabitants of this neighborhood, many of them sculptors and masons acquired property from the brothers of the Augustinian Order. Using a Baroque design by Jacomo Franchini. Construction began in 1682 and the church was completed in 1685; while Giovanni Antonio Mazzuoli completed the interior sculptural decoration and the main altar with a bas-relief of Apparition of the Virgin to St Anthony of Padua. The bell tower was reconstructed in 1800. The cupola is decorated with murals depicting St Anthony in Glory by Vincenzo Dei. The lateral altars were built in the late 1700s by the local sculptor Gaspero Fineschi and decorated by the stucco artist Bernardino Cremoni.

The interior includes four oval paintings by members of the Mazzuoli and Nasini family:

- St Jerome and the Angel (1685) attributed to Giuseppe Nicola Nasini (1685).
- St Ansano baptizes first Christians of Siena (1686-1689) by Annibale Mazzuoli.
- Martyrdom of St Bartholemew (1686) by Antonio Nasini.
- St Sebastian healed by St Irene (1686) by Annibale Mazzuoli.

The main altarpiece depicts the legendary miracle when St Anthony of Padua restores an amputated leg (Guarigione della gamba staccata). The miracle is also depicted on the floor in the work in inlaid marble mosaics (1891) by Leopoldo Maccari.

Also present in the church are a St Anthony preaches to Fishes (1697), by Annibale Mazzuoli; a stucco bas-relief or the Virgin offers her baby Jesus to St Antonio, by Giovanni Antonio Mazzuoli (1685); a wooden altarpiece with Scenes in the Life of St Anthony, by Antonio Manetti and Angelo Barbetti (1831-1832); a Madonna and Child, by Francesco Mazzuoli (1836).

== Sources ==
- Official website of Cantrade della Tartuca
