= The Death of Adonis (Mazzuoli) =

c. 1710 sculpture by Giuseppe Mazzuoli

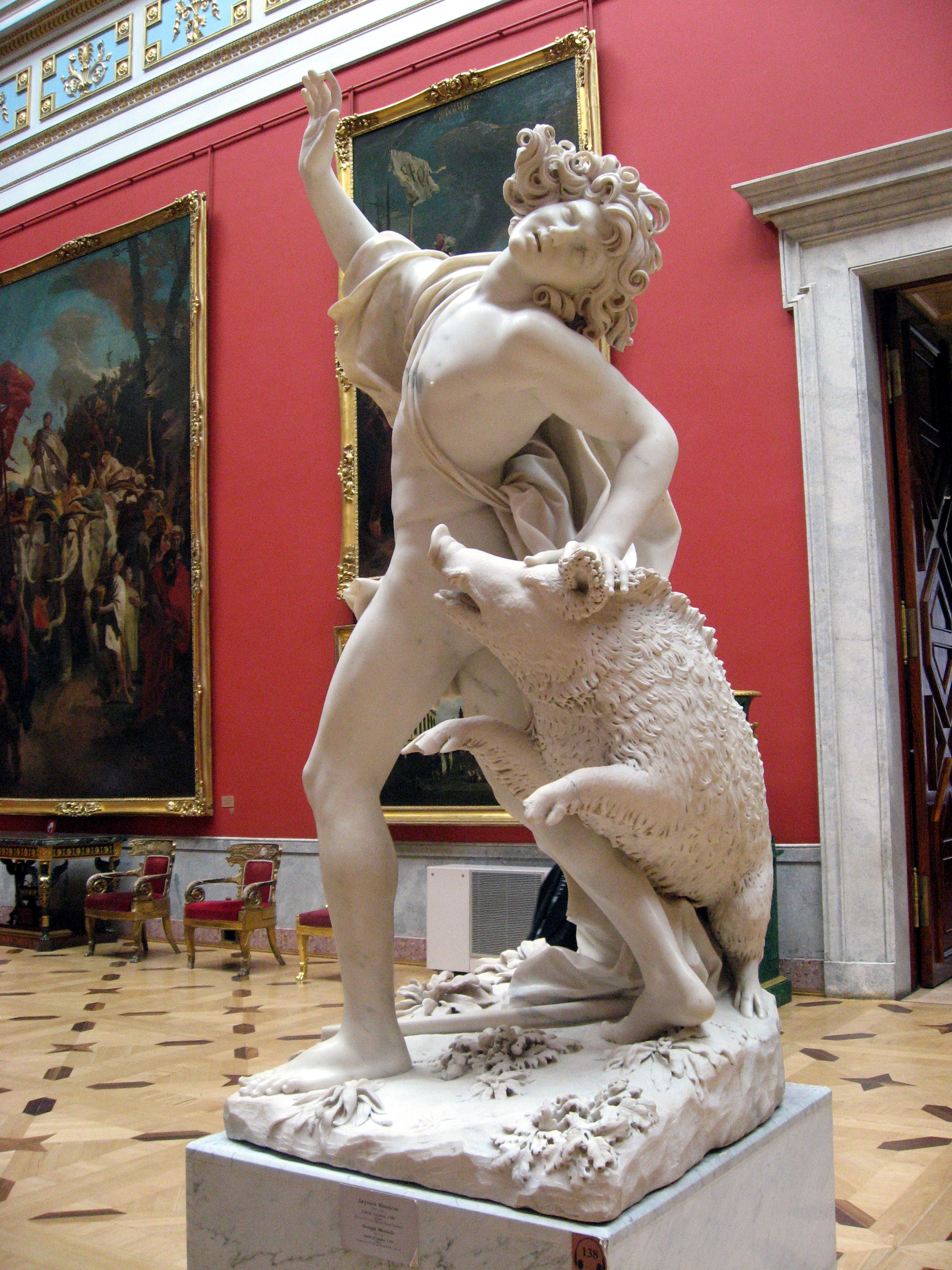
- Artist: Giuseppe Mazzuoli
- Year: 1710s
- Medium: Marble sculpture
- Dimensions: 193 cm
- Location: Hermitage Museum; Saint Petersburg, Russia

The Death of Adonis is a 1700-1710 marble sculpture by Giuseppe Mazzuoli, now in the Hermitage Museum. The tale of the death of Adonis comes from Ovid's Metamorphoses and tells of the handsome youth, beloved of the goddess Venus, who died whilst out hunting wild boars. It entered in the Hermitage in 1923; formerly in the Musin-Pushkin collection.
