= Annibale Mazzuoli =

Italian painter (1658–1743)

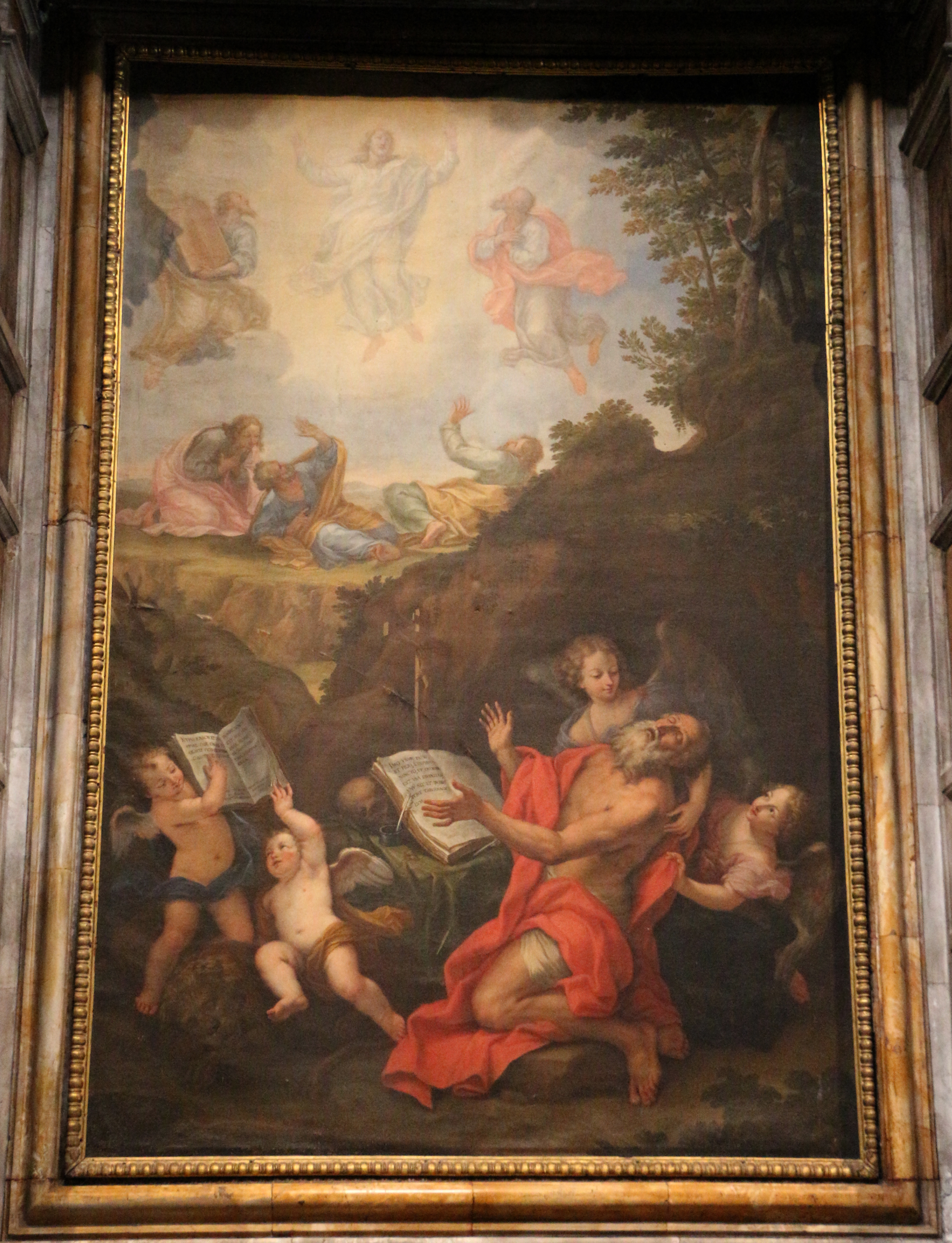
Extacy di Saint Jerome, Siena Cathedral

Annibale Mazzuoli (1658 – 17 December 1743) was an Italian painter.

He was born in Siena to a pedigree of artists. His father was the architect Dionisio. His brothers include sculptors Giuseppe Mazzuoli and Antonio Giovanni; architect Francesco; and the wood-carver Agostino. The sculptor, Bartolomeo, was his nephew, and the son of Antonio Giovanni. Annibale began his career in Siena, and was described by Luigi Lanzi as a "fresco painter of rapid execution, but little merit".

== Works in or near Siena ==
In 1697, Annibale frescoed the choir and the ceiling of the dome of the church of San Martino. An altar of Cathedral hosts a canvas depicting the Ecstasy of Saint Jerome, dated 1671. In the church and convent of Santa Margherita in Castelvecchio, owned by the Contrada of the Pantera, ha painted the ceiling fresco in collaboration with Giuseppe Nicola Nasini, while in 'Oratory of St. Anthony he painted altarpieces of St Bartholomew and St Sebastian. For the Certosa of Siena he painted a San Bruno. A fresco of the Meeting of Pope Gregory VII and Henry IV, painted in 1695, is exhibited in the Palazzo Publico of Siena. Other frescoes are in the Church of San Vigilio. As with the frescoes of Life of San Gerardo can be found in Oratorio of St. Louis and Gerard. In the church of Basilica of San Domenico is one of his canvases The Ecstasy of Saint Catherine of Siena. Other frescoes and altarpieces in the city were painted by him for the Church of Maria Santissima del Rosario, the Oratory of San Bernardino al Prato, the church of San Francesco.

Outside the city, he painted at Colle di Val d'Elsa for the Duomo and the church of San Pietro. He also painted in the church of Sant’Agostino in San Gimignano, and the Duomo of Montepulciano.

== Later work in Rome ==
Mazzuoli was called to Rome by Pope Clement XI where he worked, among other projects, on the restoration of several paintings in the Vatican. He is somewhat infamous for a major 1710–1712 restoration of the frescoes by Michelangelo in Sistine Chapel. Annibale and his son, Giovanni Antonio Bartolomeo, used Greek Wine and sponges to clean the frescoes.

One of Mazzuoli's pupils in Rome was Giovanni Pietro Cremoni. Mazzuoli died on 17 December 1743 in Rome.
