= Antonio Federighi =

Italian architect and sculptor (c. 1420–1490)

Antonio Federighi (circa 1420 – 1490) was an Italian architect and sculptor of the Renaissance period. He was born and active mainly in Siena, Italy.

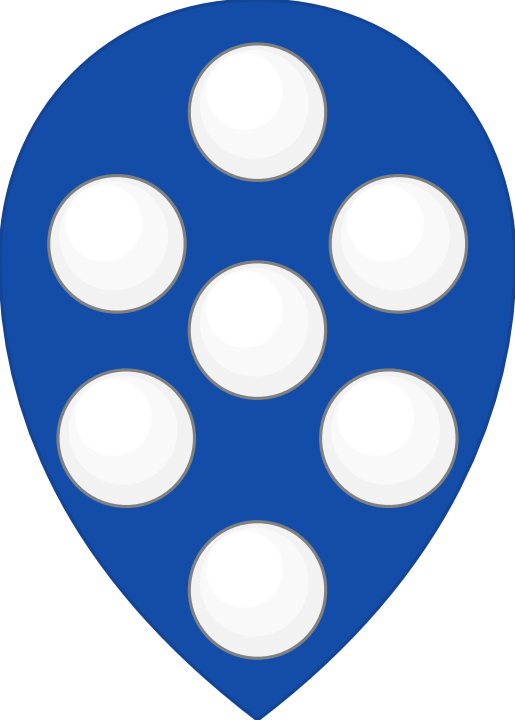
Arms of Federighi family.

He began as a sculptor for the Duomo of Siena, and worked there alongside Jacopo della Quercia. In 1448, he rose to Capomaestro dell'Opera del Duomo, working with Pietro di Tommaso del Minella. Among his work at the Cathedral of Siena is the marble intarsio design of the Erythraean Sibyl (1482). He was also Capomaestro for the Cathedral of Orvieto. He designed the Palazzo delle Papesse and the nearby Loggia del Papa (1462–63). He may have contributed to the design of Santa Maria delle Nevi.

Federighi is considered as the architect who reintroduced the heavily foliated carving and the antique pagan imagery into the vocabulary of Sienese Quattrocento sculpture. During his work as the Capomaestro of the Opera, he has designed multiple holy water basins (Acquasantieras) that, for a long time, were mistaken for pagan alters. The Acquasantiera he designed is considered to have been commissioned to celebrate a marriage between the powerful clans or the birth of a mutual heir.

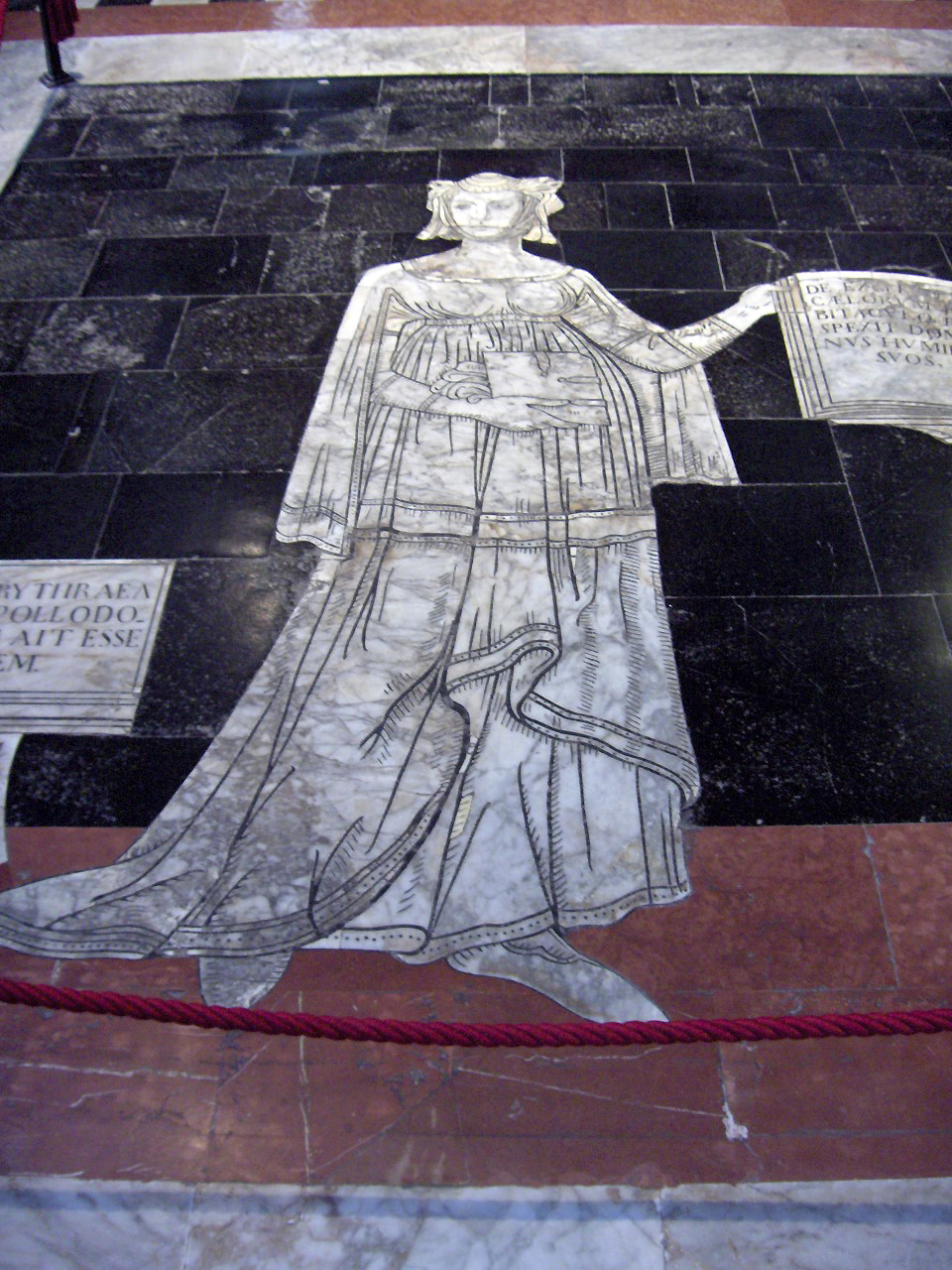
Erythraean Sibyl floor mosaic in the Cathedral of Siena
