= Mazzuoli (family) =

The Mazzuoli family of Umbria and Tuscany, included many artists:

- Dinoisio di Francesco Mazzuoli, was born in c.1600-1620 in Cortona, and died 1669 in Siena. He was an architect and sculptor.

Dionisio had five sons:

- Giovanni Antonio Mazzuoli was born in Siena in 1640, and worked as a stonemason, sculptor, and stucco-artist.
- Giuseppe Mazzuoli (1644 Volterra – 1725 Rome) was a sculptor.
- Annibale Mazzuoli (Siena, 1658 – Rome, 17 December 1743) was a painter.
- Francesco Mazzuoli was an architect and sculptor, born in Siena or Volterra in 1643.
- Agostino Mazzuoli was a stonemason.

Giovanni Antonio had sons, both sculptors and stucco artists:

- Bartolomeo Mazzuoli, son of Giovanni Antonio, was a sculptor and stucco artist born in 1674 in Siena.
- Giuseppe Maria the younger, son of Giovanni Maria, brother of Bartolomeo, was a sculptor and stucco artist born in 1727 in Siena, and died there in 1781.
- Francesco Mazzuoli the younger, son of Giuseppe Maria the younger, was a painter born in 1763 in Siena, and died there in 1839.

It is not clear if the family above is related to the family of the famous Parmesan painter Parmigianino, whose full name was Girolamo Francesco Maria Mazzola, and whose surname is sometimes spelled Mazzuoli.
