= Santa Maria delle Nevi, Siena =

Church building in Siena, Italy

Coordinates: 43.3215°N 11.3300°E

Santa Maria delle Nevi is a small Renaissance style Roman Catholic church or oratory located on Via Banchi di Sopra in the Terzo di Camollia of the city of Siena, region of Tuscany, Italy.

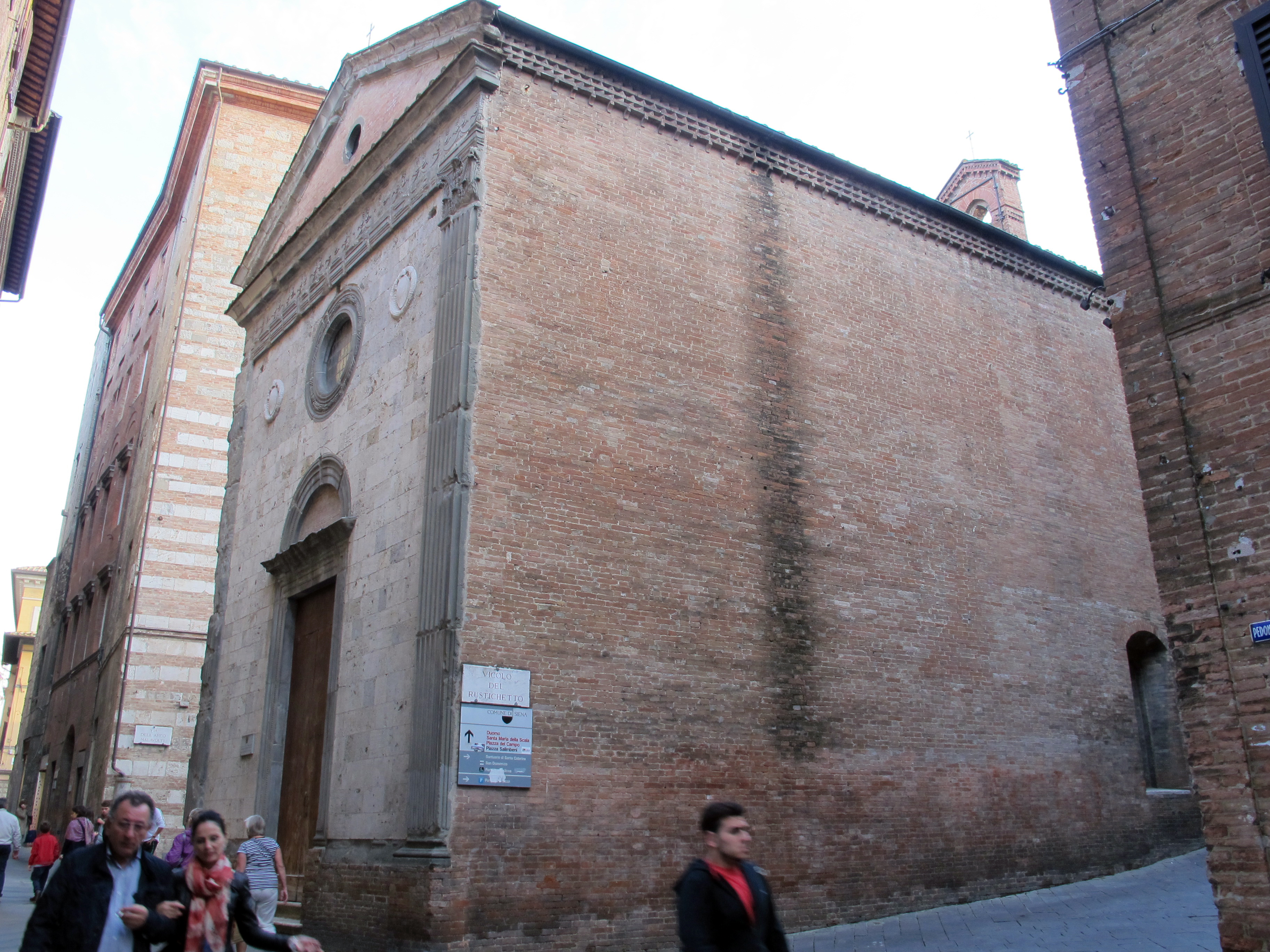
Oratory with façade.

== History ==
Construction of the church was commissioned in 1471 by the Bishop of Pienza, Giovanni Cinughi de' Pazzi. The Cinughi were a prominent Sienese family. The design is attributed to either Francesco di Giorgio Martini or Antonio Federighi.

It has a classic simplicity to the facade. Two pilasters with Corinthian capitals flank the facade with a tympanum with a circular window featuring two flanking marble heraldic shields of the Cinughi family.

The interior is notable for the main altarpiece depicting an Enthroned Madonna and Child with Saints Peter, Lawrence, Catherine of Sienna and John the Evangelist (1477) by Matteo di Giovanni. The Virgin is surrounded by angels with chalices of snow, recalling the miracle that led to the veneration at the church of Santa Maria Maggiore in Rome.
