= Palazzo Piccolomini-Clementini =

Palace in Siena

Coordinates: 43.318865°N 11.333430°E

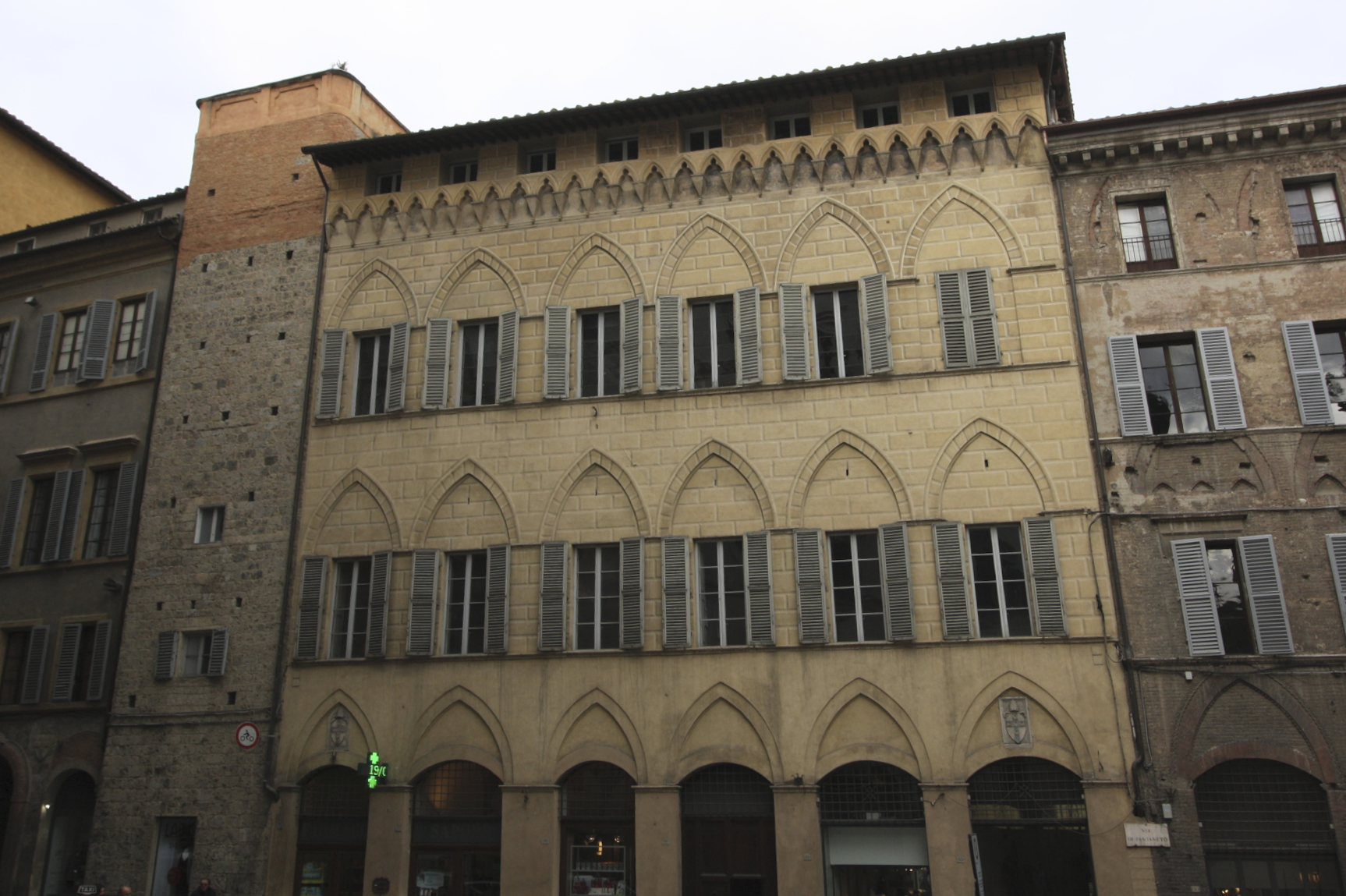
Palazzo Piccolomini-Clementini, Siena

The Palazzo Piccolomini-Clementini is a Gothic-style palace located on Via Banchi di Sotto #75 in the city of Siena, region of Tuscany, Italy. It is located across the street from the more imposing Renaissance-style Palazzo Piccolomini and the Loggia del Papa. The nearby Palazzo delle Papesse was also built by a Piccolomini family member.

== History ==
The three-story palace, notable for the acute arches around doors and windows, was built at the end of the 14th century. The northernmost arch is surmounted by the coat of arms of the Piccolomini (Cross with five crescents and a papal tiara). The interior has 16th-century monochrome frescoes attributed to Giovanni Battista di Jacomo del Capanna. The central courtyard has a well made with pietra serena. Refurbishment of the interiors were pursued in the 19th century in a Neoclassical-style by the architect Agostino Fantastici under commission from the Piccolomini-Clementini family. The piano nobile was frescoed (circa 1830-35) by Cesare Maffei with Scenes from the Life of Achilles.

Countess Bianca Piccolomini-Clementini, a patron of Catholic charities and one of the founders of the Society of Saint Angela Merici, was born in 1875 in this palace. Pope Francis declared her venerable in 2016.
