= Federighi =

Federighi is a surname. Notable people with the surname include:

- Antonio Federighi (c.1420–1490), Italian architect and sculptor
- Benozzo Federighi (died 1450), Roman Catholic prelate
- Craig Federighi (born 1969), American engineer and business executive
