= Bianca Piccolomini Clementini =

Italian Roman Catholic nun (1875 – 1959)

Venerable Bianca Piccolomini Clementini
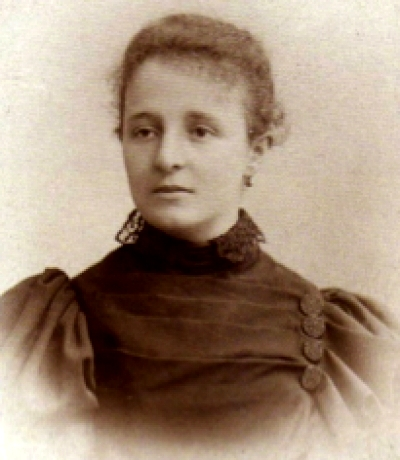
- Born: April 7, 1875; Siena, Italy
- Died: August 14, 1959 (aged 84)

Bianca Piccolomini Clementini (1875 – 1959) was an Italian Roman Catholic nun and founder of the Company of Saint Angela Merici, the original name for the Ursuline order in Italy, in 1920. Pope Francis declared her venerable in 2016.

== Biography ==
Clementini was born in Siena to a noble family, and she was a countess. The Palazzo Piccolomini-Clementini, built in the 14th century, is named for her family. Her parents were prosperous landowners and devout Catholics. Her family owned an embroidery workshop, and when they made her director of the shop, she undertook the religious formation of the women who worked there.

There is a street named for her in Siena, the Via Bianca Piccolomini Clementini.
