= Palazzo del Magnifico =

Coordinates: 43°19′5.37″N 11°19′47.20″E

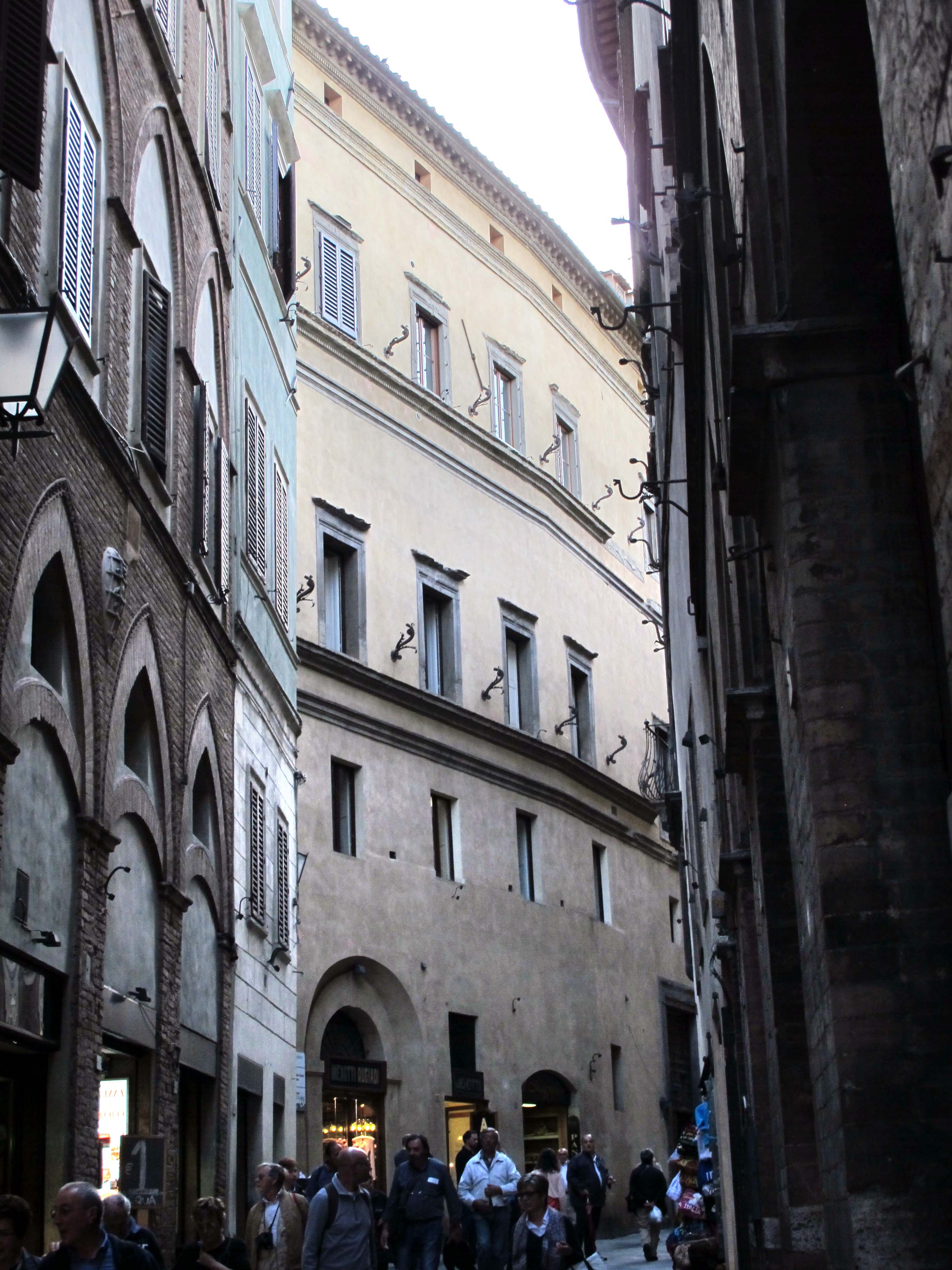
Palazzo del Magnifico

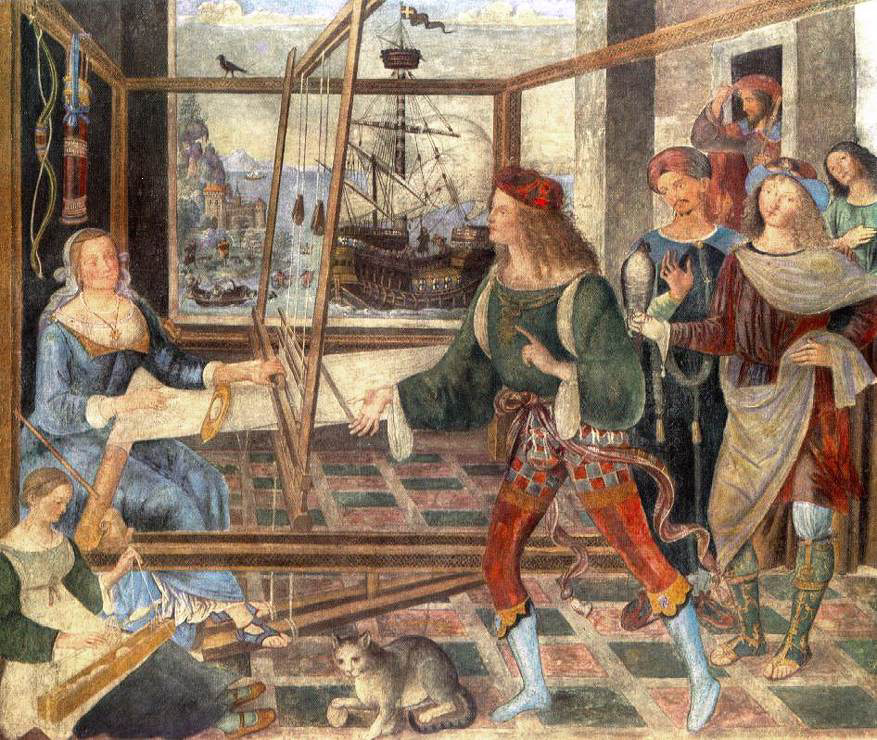
Pinturicchio, Ritorno di Ulisse

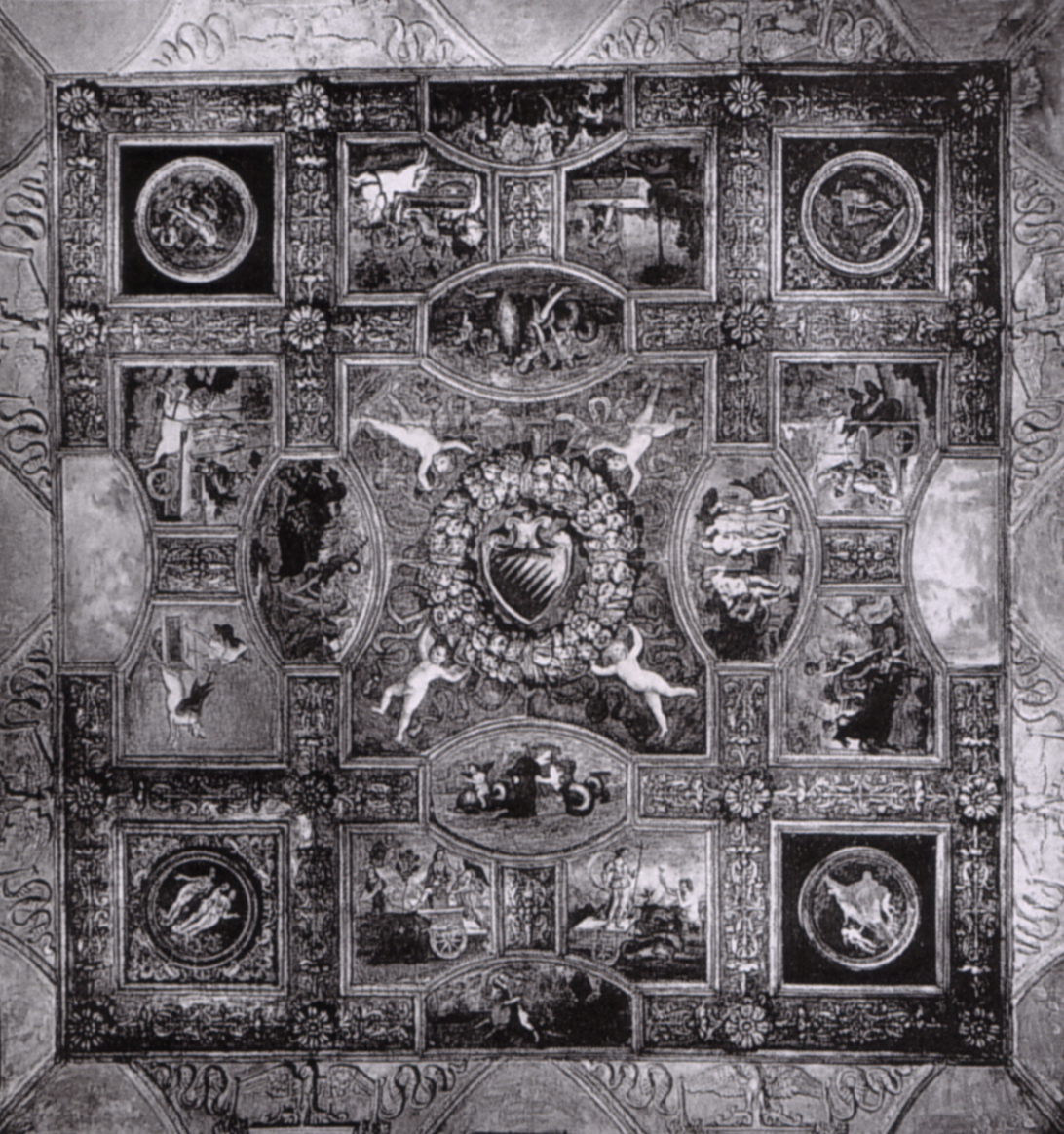
Soffitto del Salone del palazzo del Magnifico, Metropolitan Museum

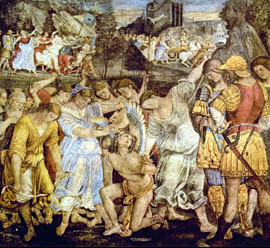
Luca Signorelli, Amore sconfitto e trionfo di Castità

Palazzo del Magnifico, also known as Palazzo Petrucci, built as the residence of Pandolfo Petrucci, is located in Siena on Piazza San Giovanni at the corner of Via dei Pellegrini.

== History ==
Pandolfo Petrucci was a rich Sienese aristocrat and effectively ruled the city from 1487 to 1512. The palace was built in 1508 by Domenico di Bartolomeo to a design by Giacomo Cozzarelli and was among the most magnificent Italian mansions of the time.

The main salon was decorated by the best artists then active in Siena, including Pinturicchio, Luca Signorelli, and Girolamo Genga. The decorations were probably completed in 1509 to mark the wedding of Petrucci's son, Borghese Petrucci to Vittoria Piccolomini on 22 September.

Pandolfo Petrucci died in 1512 and his son Borghese Petrucci was ousted from power in Siena only months later. Starting in 1512 the precious interior decorations underwent dispersion, culminating in tearing out the frescoes and dismantling of decorations in the hall.

== Description ==
The facade was decorated with many bells and refined bronze bracelets, which are now in the Palazzo Pubblico.

The living room was a large room with a ceiling painted by Pinturicchio and his workshop in a series of compartments with mythological scenes that elaborated the scheme of the Volta gold in the Domus Aurea which Pinturicchio had seen in Rome. It included eight scenes on frescoed walls, which are now partly lost and partly divided between the Pinacoteca Nazionale (Siena) and museums around the world. The paintings were surrounded by a wooden structure carved by the famous Barili workshop and majolica tiles lined the floor.

Overall, the theme of the decoration was derived from epic poetry, ancient history and the fourteenth-century literary tradition and drew on examples of civil and military virtue.

=== Ceiling of the hall ===
The ceiling of the hall was divided into squares by gilded stucco with fresco figured panels of various shapes. It is now in the Metropolitan Museum of New York City. At the center is a coat of arms within a wreath. On the four sides of the central compartment are ovals with scenes of the Rape of Europa, Helle rides the ram, Nymph riding a seahorse and the Judgment of Paris. Two additional compartments depict Hercules and Omphale and the Calydonian boar hunt. Among the oval and curved panels are pairs of irregular hexagons with Triumphs and other scenes with chariots, a total of eight, including a Triumphs of Alexander the Great, the Rape of Proserpine and Triumphs of Cybele, Proserpine, Amphitrite and the Sun. Finally, the corners are four medallions within boxes decorated with grotesques, which depict couples and groups of mythological characters: Bacchus and Silenus, Pan, Priapus Satyr and Nymph, Venus and Cupid, the Three Graces.

The set, although updated to modern schemes, provided a refined antique effect. Other mythological figures were in the spandrels between the stucco, along with episodes of Roman history and heraldic eagles of Petrucci.

Designed by Pinturicchio, the execution was probably left to assistants including Sienese local Pacchiarotto and perhaps the young Genga.

=== Walls of the hall ===
The layout for the panels decorating of walls of the main salon are known from the 18th-century descriptions made by Guglielmo Della Valle and Giovanni Girolamo Carli, made before their dispersal. In 1840 the frescoes were detached by Joly de Bammeville, and some were sold to the National Gallery in London, others are now in the town gallery:

- Luca Signorelli, Love defeated triumph of Chastity, National Gallery (London)
- Pinturicchio, Return of Ulysses, National Gallery (London)
- Pinturicchio or Luca Signorelli, Reconciliation of Coriolanus, National Gallery (London)
- Girolamo Genga, Redemption of prisoners by the son of Fabius Maximus, Pinacoteca Nazionale (Siena)
- Girolamo Genga, Flight of Aeneas from Troy, Pinacoteca Nazionale (Siena)
- Luca Signorelli, Calumny of Apelles, lost
- Luca Signorelli, Feast of Pan, lost
- ?, Scipio and the girl Celtiberiana

The fresco cycle celebrated Pandolfo Petrucci and his family. The Return of Ulysses for example, alludes to the return from exile before Pandolfo and then by his son Borghese, while the Escape of Aeneas from Virgil in the characters evokes three generations of Petrucci. The redemption of prisoners seems to be a hope that the virtuous Borghese will follow his father's footsteps, as well as a dynastic theme also alludes to the Reconciliation of Coriolanus. The Calumny of Apelles cautions to the proper administration of justice and Love defeated with the triumph of Chastity was a tribute to the wedding with echoes of the Triumphs of Petrarch, as well as the theme of the Continence of Scipio, a typical scene from the wedding chest.

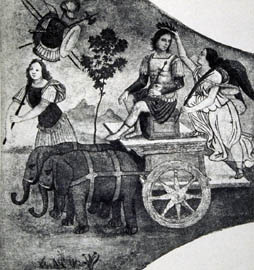
Trionfo di condottiero

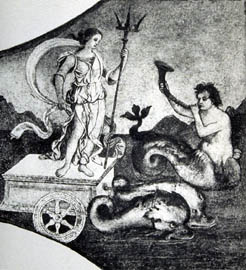
Trionfo di Anfitrite

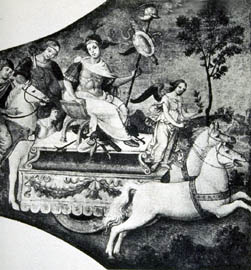
Trionfo di Cibele

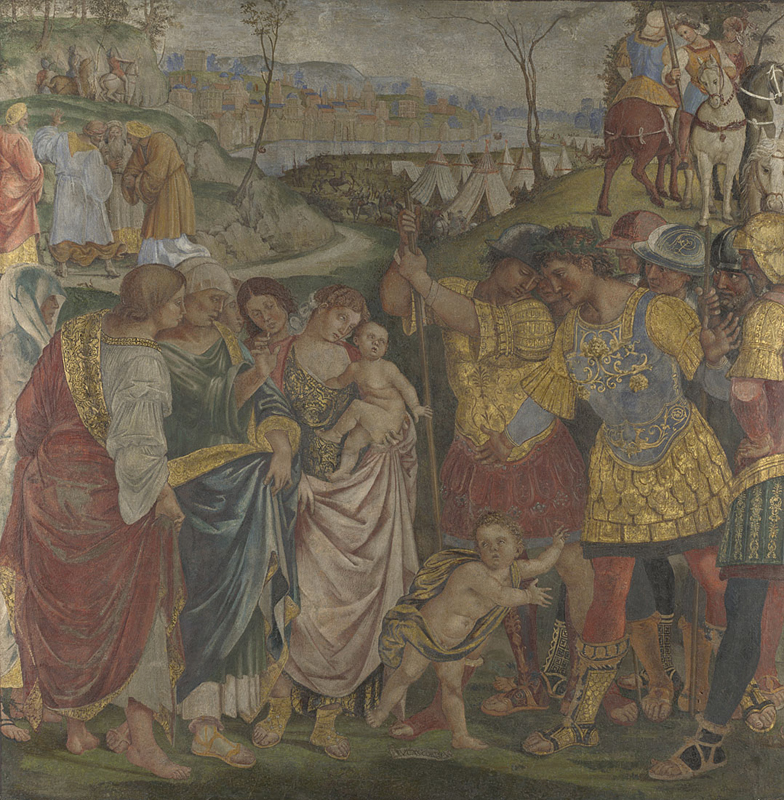
Luca Signorelli o Pinturicchio, Riconciliazione di Coriolano

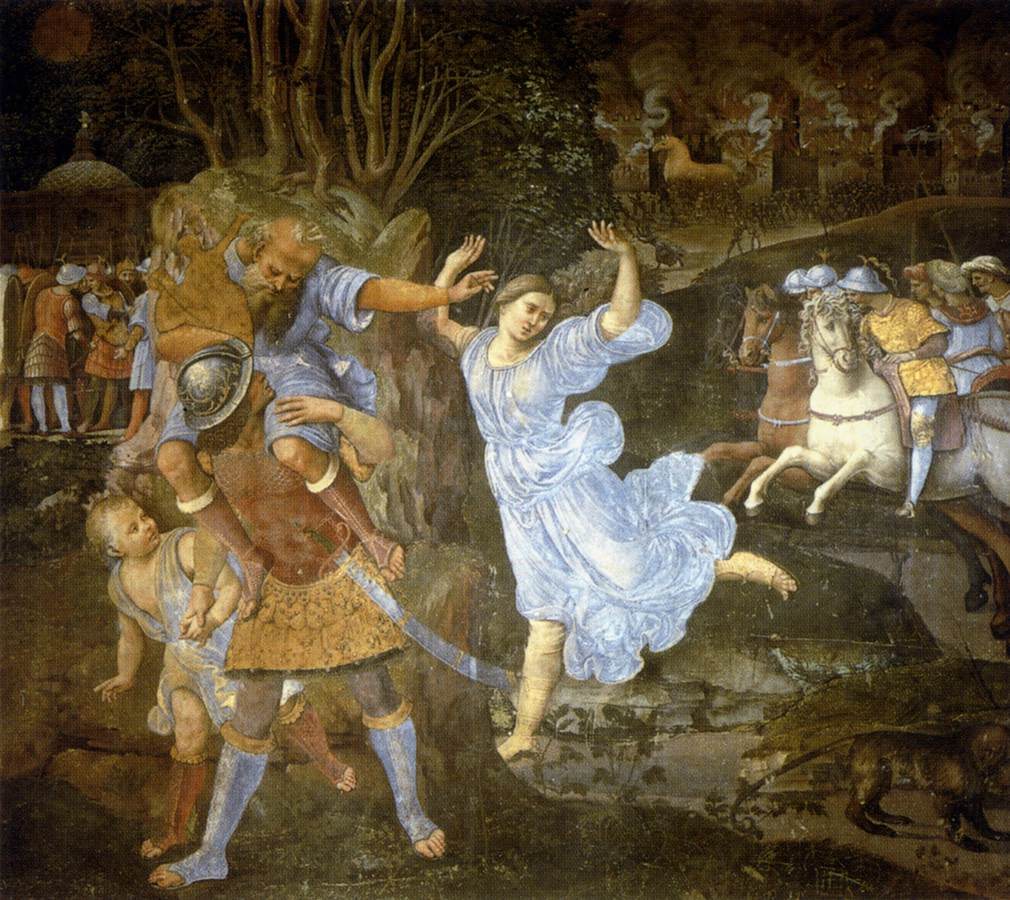
Girolamo Genga, Fuga da Troia

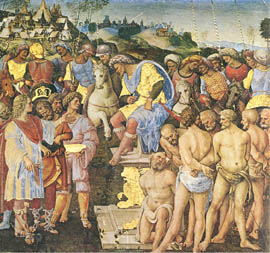
Girolamo Genga, Riscatto dei prigionieri
