= State Archives of Siena =

State archival institution in Siena, Italy

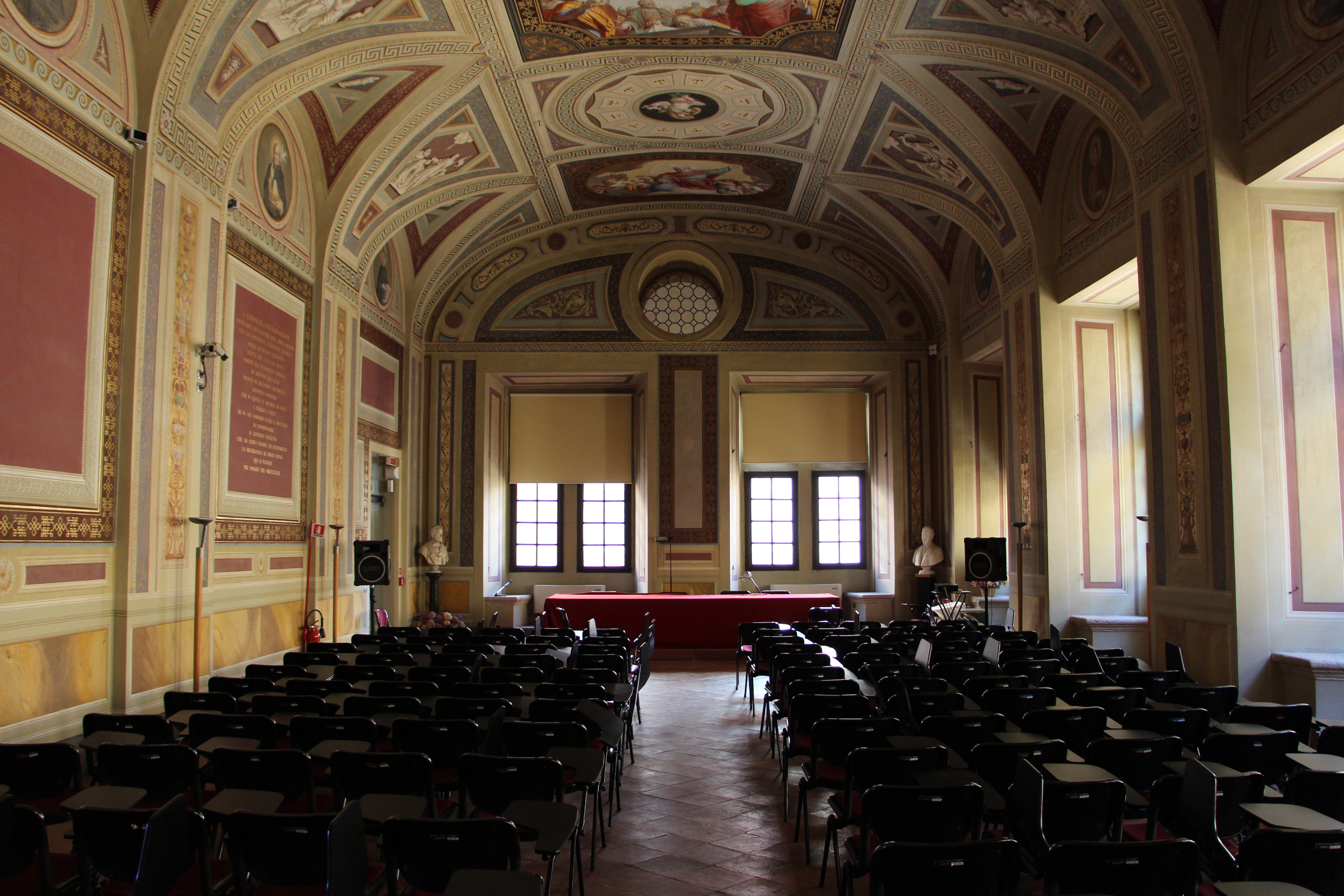
- Interactive map of State Archives of Siena
- 43.319°N 11.3329°E
- Location: Banchi di Sotto, 52, Siena, Italy
- Type: State archives
- Established: 17 November 1858; 167 years ago

Building information
- Building: Palazzo Piccolomini
- Website: https://archiviodistatosiena.cultura.gov.it

The State Archives of Siena (Italian: Archivio di Stato di Siena) is the state institution responsible, by law, for the preservation of records from the offices of state bodies, as well as public bodies and private producers, in the province of Siena. It is located in the Palazzo Piccolomini in Siena.

The archive was established by Grand duke Leopold II of Tuscany on 17 November 1858. It preserves approximately 60,000 parchment documents, resolutions and statutes of the Republic of Siena, correspondence and records of judicial and financial administrations, such as the Biccherna. The archives cover a time span from 736 to the 20th century.

== Bibliography ==
- "Archivio di Stato di Siena". Guida generale degli Archivi di Stato italiani (PDF). Rome: Ministero per i beni culturali e ambientali. 1983.
- Lodolini, Elio (1998). Lineamenti di storia dell'archivistica italiana. Rome: Carocci.
