= Palazzo Piccolomini, Pienza =

Castles of Tuscany

Piccolomini Palace
- Palazzo Piccolomini
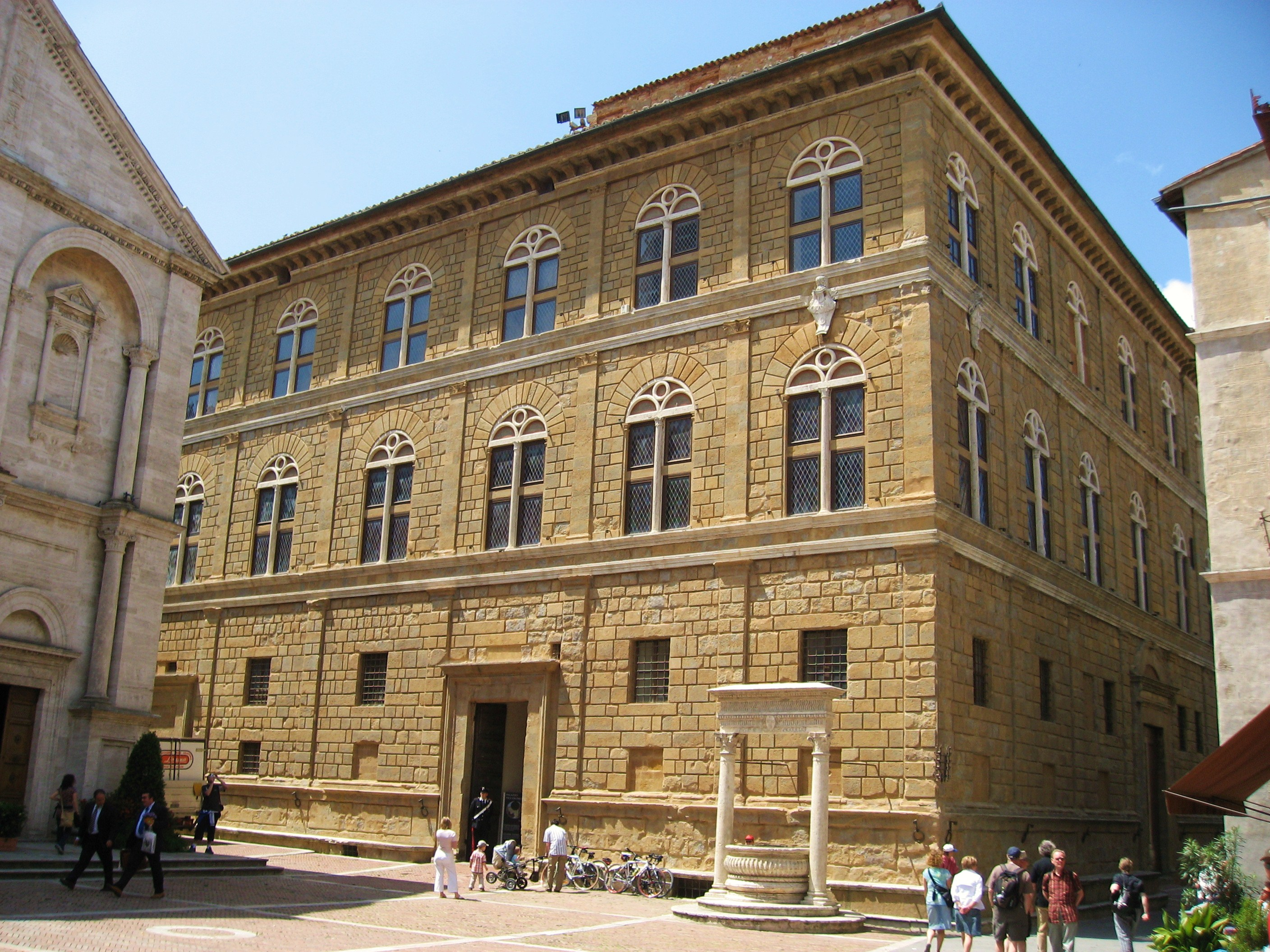
- Palazzo Piccolomini.

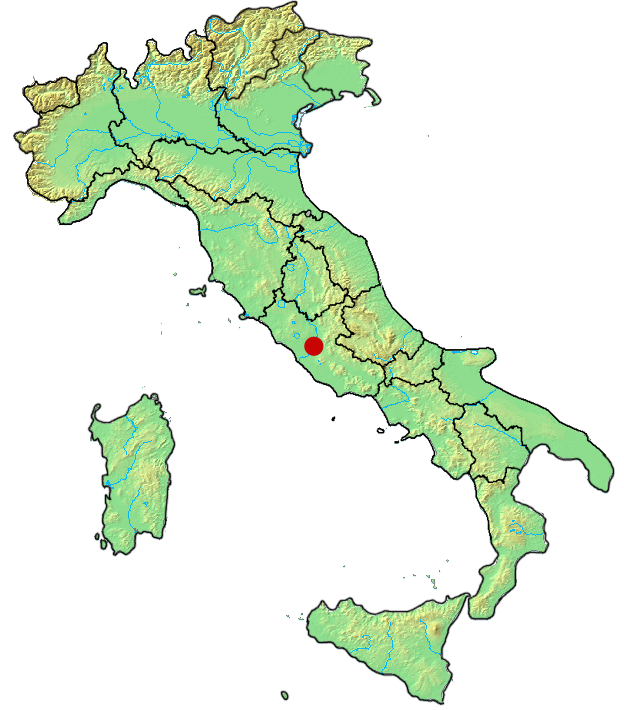
- Map of Italy

General information
- Architectural style: Renaissance architecture
- Location: Castelfiorentino, Piazza Pio II, 2, Italy
- Coordinates: 43°4′35″N 11°40′43″E
- Completed: 1459

Design and construction
- Architect: Bernardo Rossellino

Website
- www.palazzopiccolominipienza.it

Palazzo Piccolomini ("Piccolomini Palace" in English) is a palace in the center of Pienza, Italy, next to the Duomo. Palazzo Piccolimini is one of the earliest examples of Renaissance architecture and was built starting in 1459 to a design by Bernardo Rossellino. It was commissioned by Pope Pius II, born Enea Silvio Piccolomini, a native of the small village of Corsignano which would later be renamed "Pienza", meaning "cittá di Pio" ("city of Pio"), in his honor.

== History ==
The palace, also known as the Pontifical, was commissioned by Enea Piccolomini, or Pope Pius II, to Italian Renaissance sculpture Bernardo Rossellino, as part of the project for the reconstruction of Pienza as the ideal city. It was designed in the second half of the 15th century, after 1459. For its construction Rossellino was inspired by the Palazzo Rucellai in Florence, the work of his master Leon Battista Alberti. The residential palace is one of the earliest examples of Renaissance architecture.

== Description ==
The building is now a museum, where you can visit the ancient hall of arms, Pius II's study, bedchambers, the art and sculpture collection he built. It has a square plan, developed on three floors, made of rustic light stone. It is one of the buildings in the trapezoidal piazza. On the west side is the Palazzo Piccolomini. The Duomo Cathedral is at the center of the piazza.

On the ground floor there is a main entrance to the building that overlooks the central courtyard. The courtyard is rectangular with a loggia to supported by stone columns. On the first and second floors there are two rows of windows of considerable size, equal distant from each other, with pilaster pilasters with Renaissance architecture. Each window is divided into two parts by a thin column. Below the windows, as if to highlight the internal attics, a frame that runs along the corners and between some windows the family crests, in stone, with the apostolic insignia in gold and silver. On a clear day, you can see distant landscape of the Val d'Orcia and the hills of Monte Amiata.

== In popular culture ==
In recent times, the building has also been used as a film set for various scenes of the films The Devil in Love with Vittorio Gassman, Pleasant Nights with Gassman and Ugo Tognazzi and for Romeo and Juliet by Zeffirelli.

In the third season of Medici (TV Series), many scenes were shot, not at the Medici Palace and courtyard in Florence, but the Piccolomini palace and square in Pienza. The palace overlooks the main square of the Tuscan town. The Piazza Pio II street is seen in almost every episode of the series.

== Gallery ==
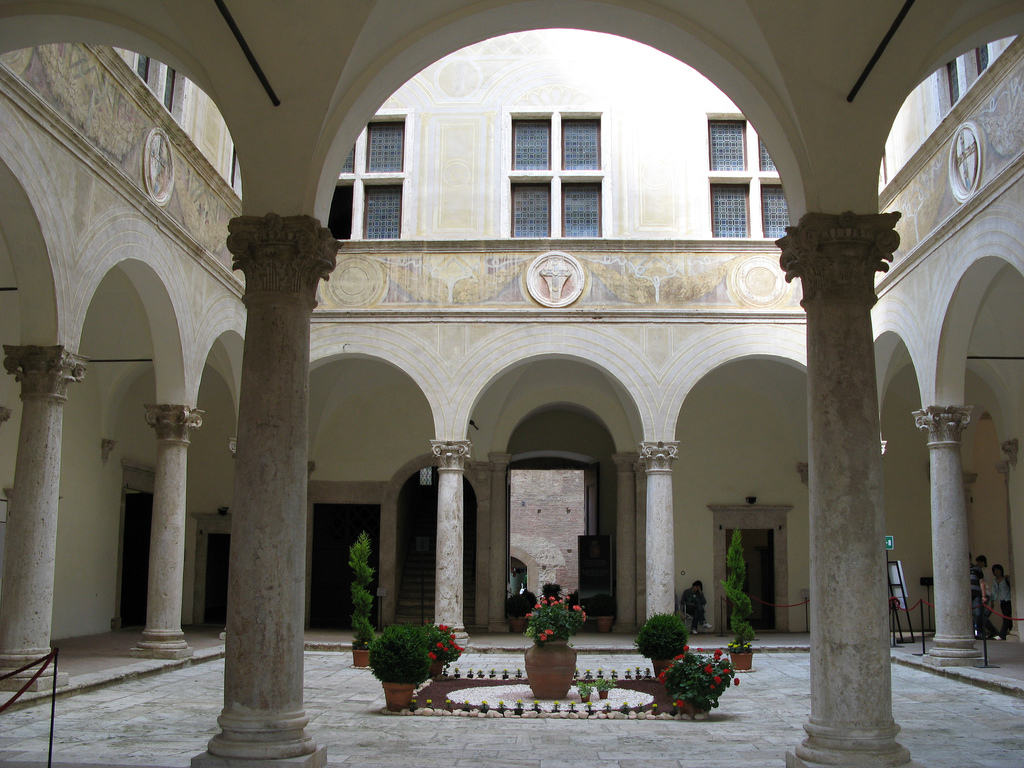
Palazzo Piccolomini Courtyard

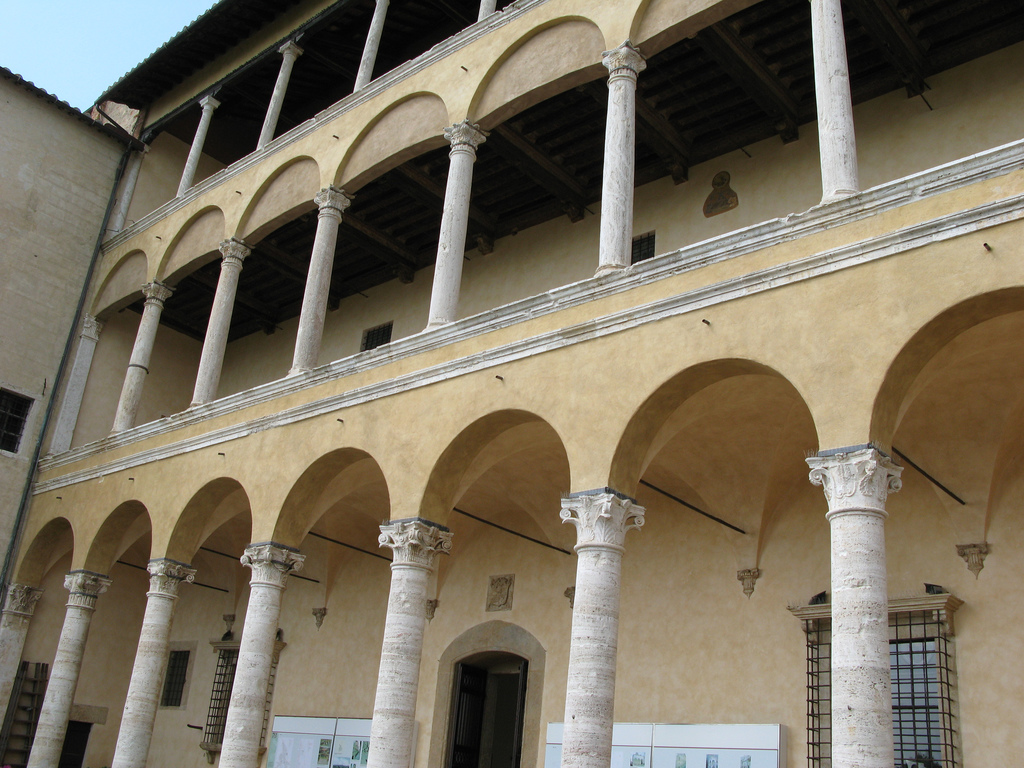
The garden facade

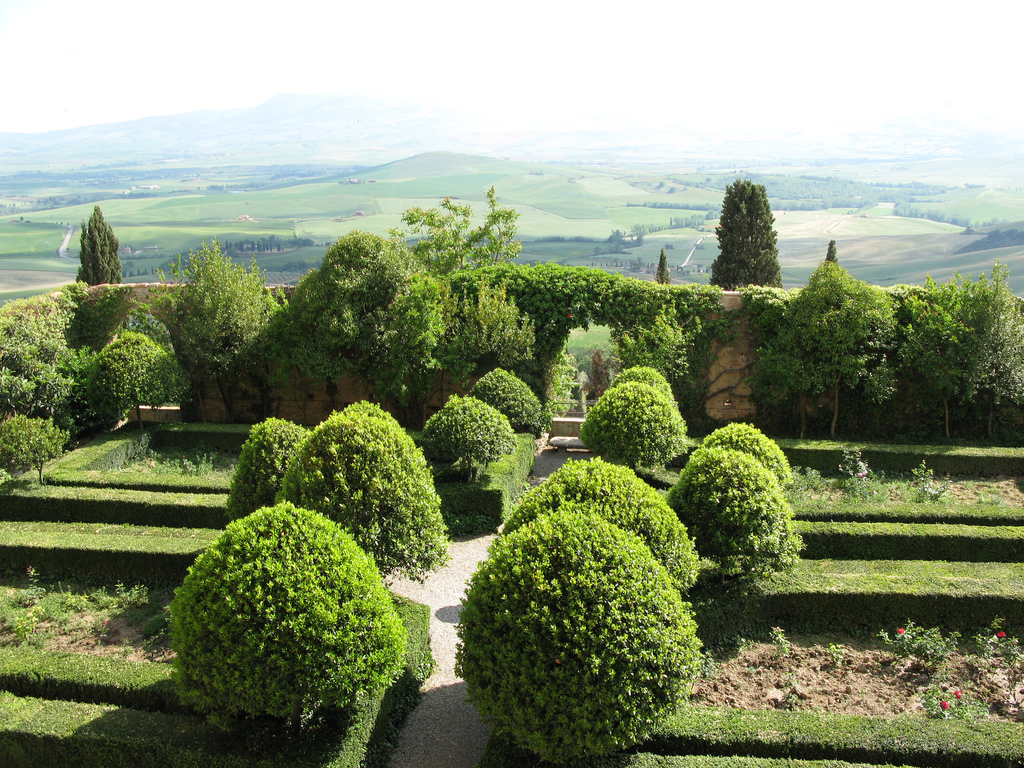
Palazzo garden

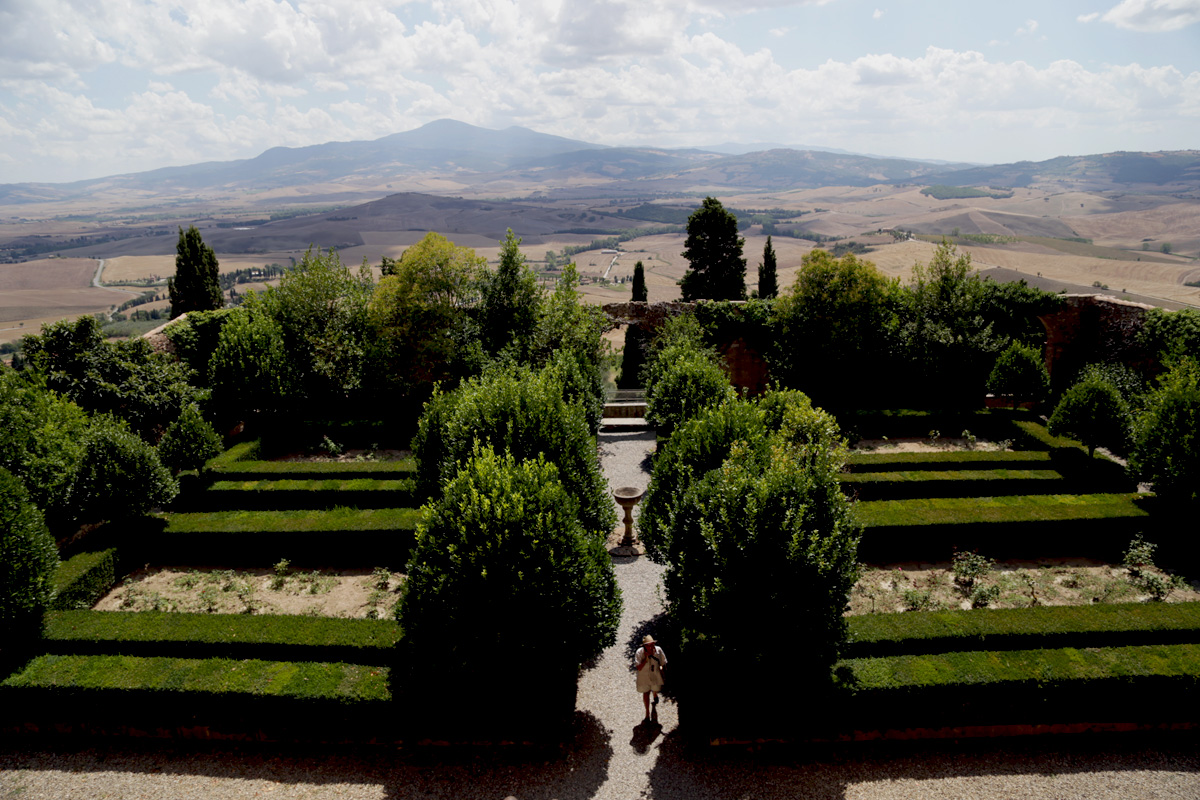
Palazzo garden and hillside

== See also ==
- Palazzo Piccolomini, Siena

== Bibliography ==
- Palazzo Piccolomini in Pienza: guide to the palace and its collections
- The Palazzo Piccolomini in Siena: Pius II's architectural patronage and its afterlife

== Related entries ==
- Ideal city
- Rucellai Palace
