= Palazzo Marsili =

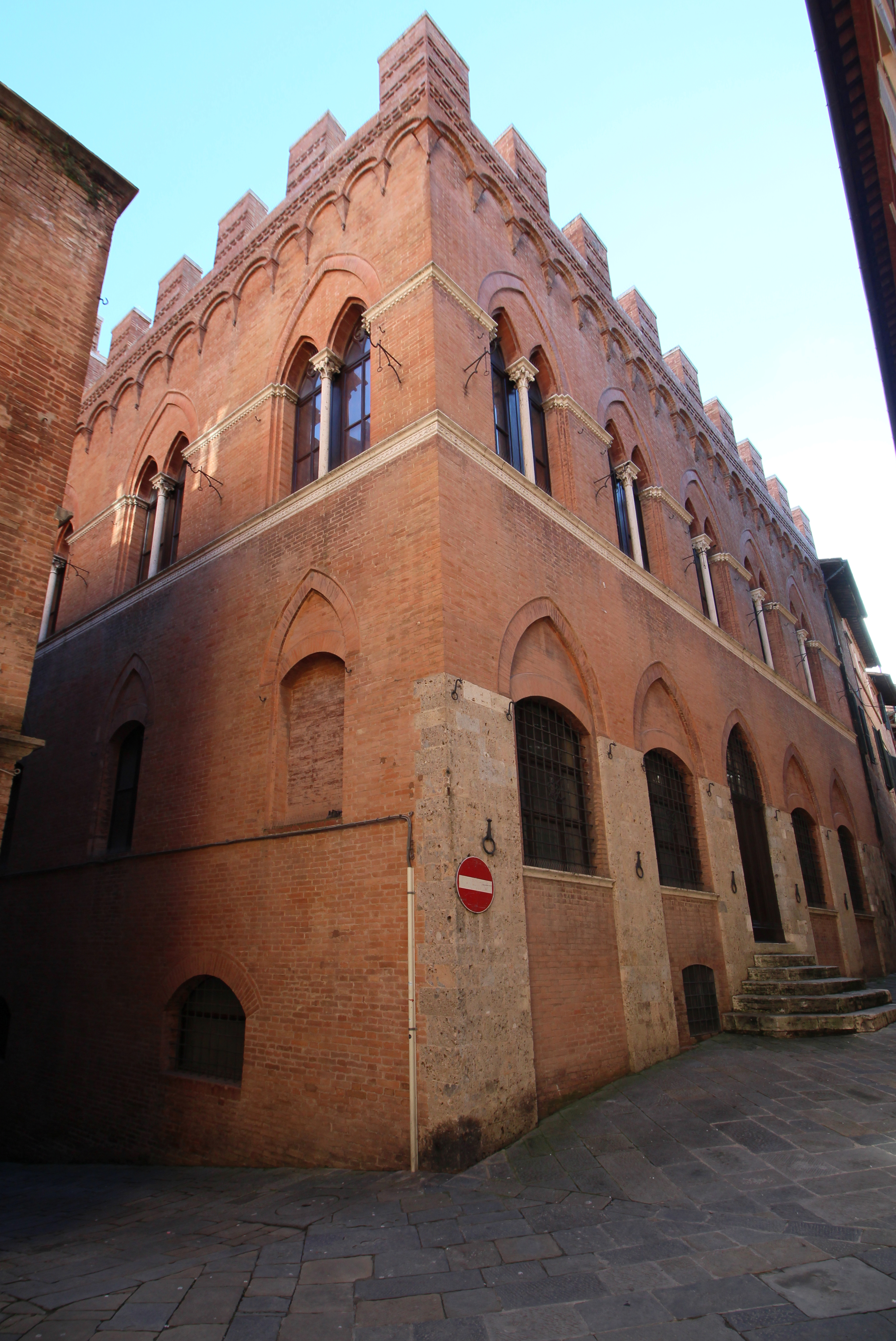
Palazzo Marsili, Siena

The Palazzo Marsili is a Gothic style urban palace localized on Via di Città #124-132, in the Terzo di Città, in the city of Siena, region of Tuscany, Italy. adjacent on Via di Città to the shorter brick Palazzo Marsili-Libelli with plain rectangular second and third story windows.

== History ==
The palace was erected at the site of a former palace in brick and stone with a Gothic style in the mid-15th century, when other palaces already began to show the influence of Florentine Renaissance. The architect was Luca di Bartolomeo Luponi. The palace was extensively restored in 1876 by Giuseppe Partini. The entrance on Via del Poggio has a marble external stairs extending into street.
