= Giuseppe Mazzuoli (1644–1725) =

Italian sculptor (1644-1725)

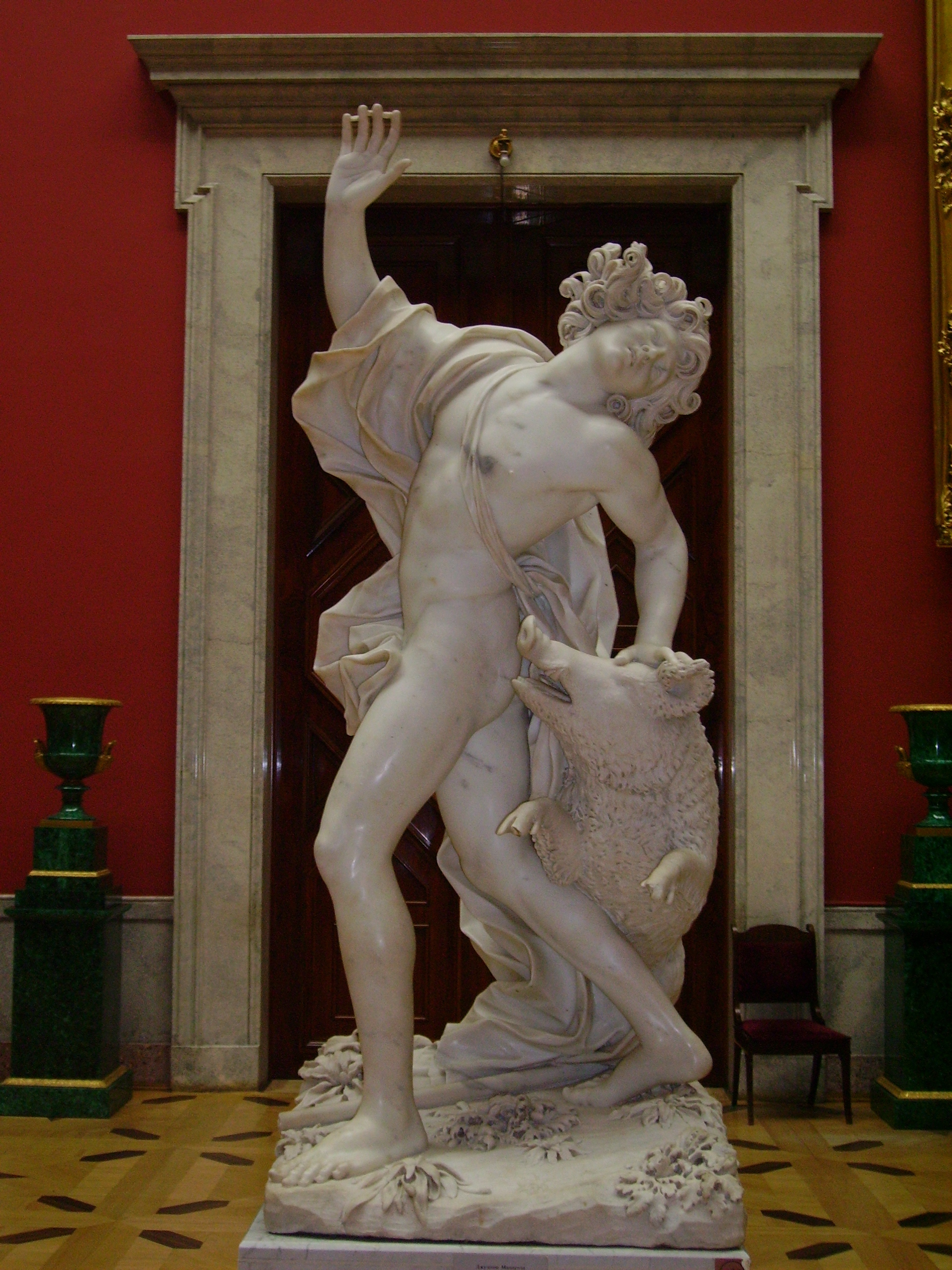
The Death of Adonis, by Mazzuoli, 1709 (Hermitage Museum)

Giuseppe Mazzuoli (1644 in Volterra – 1725 in Rome) was an Italian sculptor working in Rome in the Bernini-derived Baroque style. He produced many highly accomplished sculptures of up to monumental scale but was never a leading figure in the Roman art world.

== Life ==
Mazzuoli was born in Volterra and trained in Siena but spent his most of his adult working life in Rome. There, he entered the workshop of Ercole Ferrata where he became the only pupil of Melchiorre Cafà who also worked with Ferrata. Like Ferrata, Mazzuoli was frequently drawn on by Gian Lorenzo Bernini to assist with large commissions. He was among the co-workers who cooperated in Bernini's Tomb of Pope Alexander VII (1672–78).

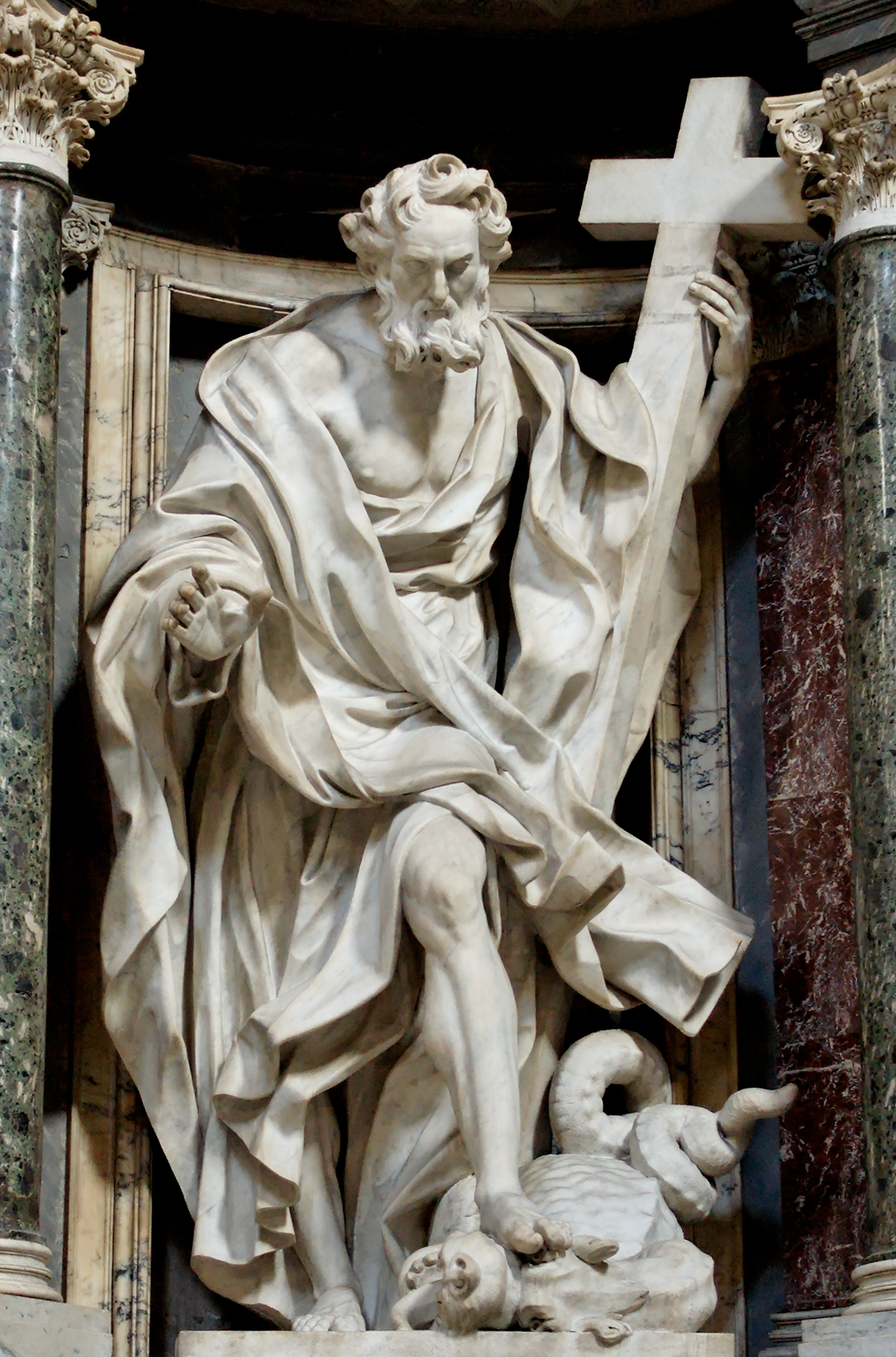
Saint Philip by Mazzuoli, (Basilica of San Giovanni in Laterano, Rome)

When late in 1702 Pope Clement XI and Benedetto Cardinal Pamphili announced their grand scheme for twelve over life-size sculptures of the Apostles to fill the niches along the nave of the Basilica of San Giovanni in Laterano, the project was divided among all the premier sculptors of Rome. Each statue was to be sponsored by an illustrious prince, and Mazzuoli was assigned the statue of Saint Philip, financed by the Bishop of Würzburg and finished in 1711. Like most sculptors, Mazzuolli was provided with a sketch by Clement's favourite painter, Carlo Maratta, which he was to follow. Robert Cahn observed "When Saint Philip is compared with other apostles in the series, it is clear that the somewhat old-fashioned, Berniniesque style manifested in Mazzuoli's single assignment was losing appeal."

Mazzuoli carried out some major commissions for the Order of Malta, most noticeably the main altar of St. John's Co-Cathedral in Valletta, finished in 1703. There, he created a marble group of the Baptism of Christ which might on the one hand have been influenced by Cafà's undocumented and abandoned designs from 1666, and it is certainly strongly dependent on a small baptism group by Alessandro Algardi. In the same church, he produced in his later years allegorical figures for the tomb of Ramon Perellos y Roccaful (died 1720), Grand Master of the Order of Malta.

His brother, Annibale Mazzuoli, was a painter. His son, also a sculptor, is generally distinguished as 'Giuseppe Mazzuoli the younger.

== Selected works, in approximate chronological order ==
- Charity, 1673–75, for Bernini's tomb of Alexander VII, carried out under the direct supervision of Bernini.
- Bust of Cardinal Giulio Gabrielli the Elder, 1675–1676, in the Museo di Roma at Palazzo Braschi in Rome.
- Saint John the Baptist and Saint John the Evangelist, 1677–79, in situ flanking the high altar at the Church of Gesù e Maria, Corso, Rome. The church and the altar were designed by Carlo Rainaldi, who is likely to have provided sketches for the sculptures that form part of the altar he designed.
- Portrait busts of Fausto Cardinal Poli and Mons. Gaudenzio Poli, c. 1680, in situ in the Sacristy designed by Bernini (1641) of the Church of San Crisogono, Rome.
- Clemency, c. 1684 an allegorical figure among the sculptures for the tomb of Clement X Altieri, St. Peter's Basilica, executed under the design direction of Mattia De Rossi (1684).
- Bust of Innocent XII, 1700, in situ in a niche in the apse of Santa Cecilia in Trastevere, Rome.
- Baptism of Christ, 1700–1703, Valletta, main altar of St. John's Co-Cathedral.
- Bust of Clement XI, 1703, also in situ in a niche in the apse of Santa Cecilia in Trastevere, Rome.
- Saint Philip, finished in 1711, in situ at the Basilica of San Giovanni in Laterano, Rome. A reduced marble version of the sculpture, probably made for the archbishop of Würzburg who financed the Lateran sculpture, is in Nuremberg, Germanisches Nationalmuseum.
- Nereid, c. 1705–15 (National Gallery of Art, Washington DC); it was identified as Thetis when in the Samuel H. Kress collection, and attributed to the "school of Bernini."
- The Death of Adonis, 1709 (Hermitage Museum, Saint Petersburg).
- Charity Triumphing over Greed, 1710–15 (Hermitage Museum, Saint Petersburg); a bronze reduction is in the collections of Harvard University Art Museums.
- (attributed to the workshop or circle of Mazzuoli) Paired busts: Diana and Endymion, c. 1710–25 (Detroit Institute of Arts).
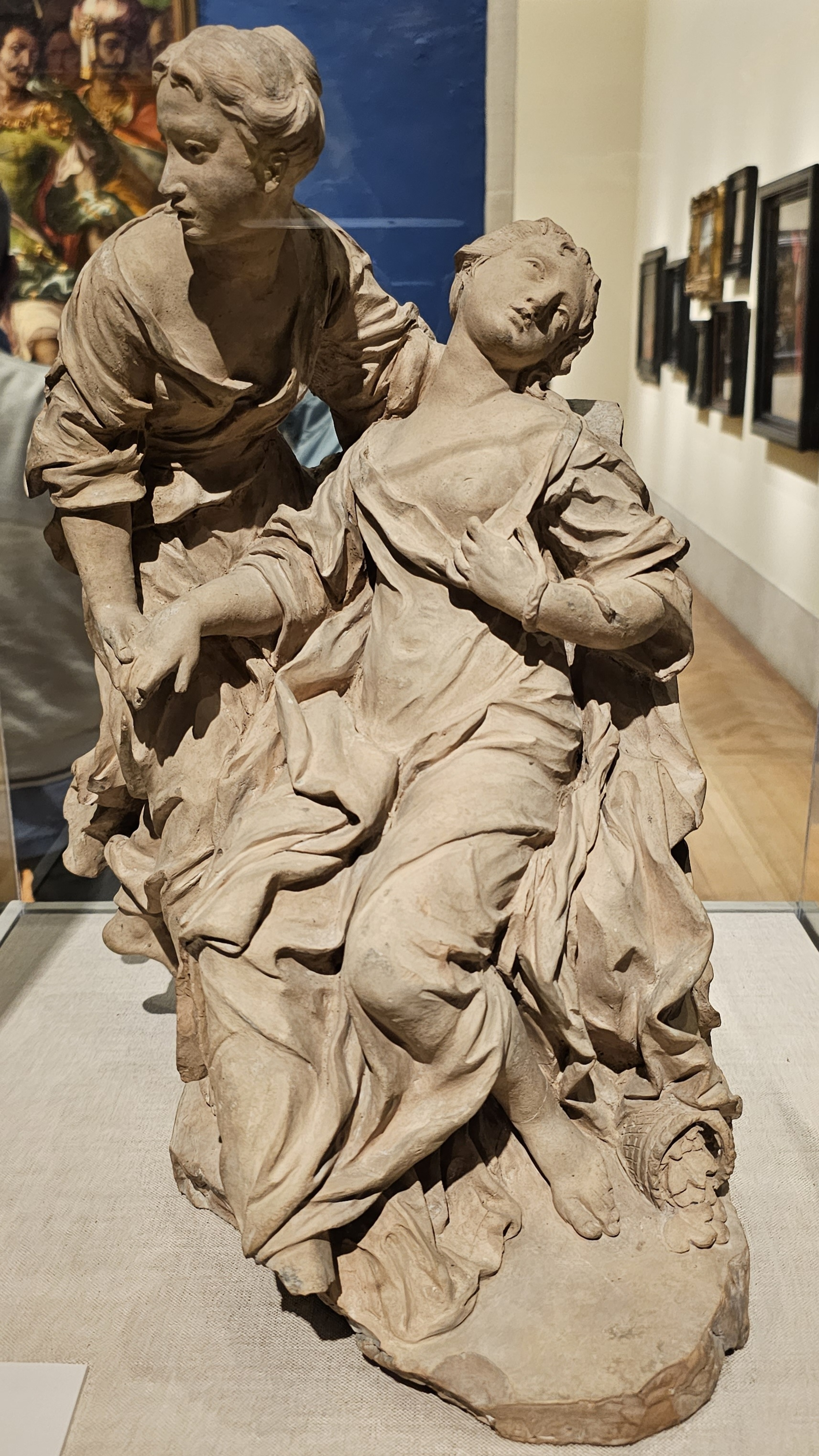
  The Death of Cleopatra in terracotta at the Philadelphia Museum of Art
- Death of Cleopatra, c. 1713 (Pinacoteca, Siena); a marble version of this group, c. 1723, is in the grounds of the Jardim Botânico Tropical, Lisbon, and a terracotta modello at the Philadelphia Museum of Art.
- Immaculate Conception, completed by September 1678, Church of San Martino, Siena. Giuseppe also completed the St Thomas of Villanova in this church.
- Apostles standing on brackets for the piers of the Duomo di Siena (Brompton Oratory, South Kensington, London. The Christ and the Virgin Mary for the same positions were removed and have been lost; they are represented by gilded terracotta modelli (bought from Jacques Heim for the Royal Scottish Museum, 1982).
- Portrait busts in medallions and allegorical figures of the four classical Virtues, dated 1713 and 1714 but executed in 1715–17 and 1718–19 (for the portrait busts), in situ in the two double funerary monuments facing each other in the Rospigliosi-Pallavicini chapel, Church of San Francesco a Ripa, Rome. The architecture of the wall monuments is by Niccolò Michetti. Portrait busts of duke Giovanni Battista and Matia Cammilla Rospigliosi-Pallavicini (Pallavicini collection, Rome) were among the works contracted from Mazzuoli; copies of them were incorporated in the chapel's wall monuments.
- (attributed to Mazzuoli) Pair of Angels above the altar in the second chapel on the left in the Church of Santa Maria in Campitelli. The attribution to Mazzuoli is strengthened by the presence once more of Carlo Rainaldi, who masterpiece is this church.
- Allegorical figures for the Tomb of Ramon Perello (died 1720), in the church of Saint John, Valletta, Malta.
- Charity, 1723 (Chapel in the Palazzo del Monte di Pietà, Rome). Mazzuoli's late work takes its place in a rich program of sculpture in the chapel originally designed by Carlo Maderno, but refitted by Giovanni Antonio De Rossi with rich colored marble revetments. Mazzuoli notes his age— età 79— with his inscribed signature.
- Education of the Virgin.

A number of terracotta models kept by Mazzuoli's heirs in Siena seem to have been part of a cache of the family workshop holdings that was donated to the Isituto di Belli Arti of Siena about 1767 by Giuseppe Maria Mazzuoli.

== Bibliography ==
- Alessandro Angelini, Giuseppe Mazzuoli, la bottega dei fratelli e la committenza della famiglia De' Vecchi, in: Prospettiva, 79.1995, p. 78–100.
- Andrea Bacchi, Stefano Pierguidi, Bernini e gli allievi: Giuliano Finelli, Andrea Bolgi, Francesco Mochi, François Duquesnoy, Ercole Ferrata, Antonio Raggi, Giuseppe Mazzuoli, Firenze [u.a.], E-Ducation.it [u.a.], 2008. – 359 S. : zahlr. Ill.; 29 cm (I grandi maestri dell'arte; 24).
- Monika Butzek, Giuseppe Mazzuoli e le statue degli Apostoli del duomo di Siena, in: Prospettiva, 61.1991, p. 75–89.
- Marina Carta, La statua della Carità di Giuseppe Mazzuoli per la Cappella del Monte di Pietà di Roma: alcune precisazioni sulla progettazione e realizzazione, in Sculture romane del Settecento: la professione dello scultore / Fondazione Marco Besso. A cura di Elisa Debenedetti. – Roma, Bonsignori, 2001 -. – (Studi sul Settecento romano; ...). 2., 2002. – (Studi sul Settecento romano; 18). – ISBN 88-7597-309-1, p. 41–53.
- Tomaso Montanari, Pittura e scultura nella Roma di fine Seicento: un busto inedito di Giuseppe Mazzuoli da un dipinto di Jacob Ferdinand Voet, in: Prospettiva, 117/118.2005(2006), p. 183–188.
- Lione Pascoli, Vite de' Pittori, Scultori ed Architetta Moderni, vol. II (Rome 1736)
- Stefano Santangelo, "L'Opera di Giuseppe Mazzuoli." Dottorato di Ricerca in Storia dell'Arte (Universita degli Studi di Roma Tor Vergata) 2010: 557 pp.
- Ursula Schlegel, "Some Statuettes of Giuseppe Mazzuoli", in: The Burlington Magazine 109 No. 772 (July) 1967, pp. 386–395.
