= Loggia del Papa, Siena =

Open-air arcade in Tuscany, Italy

Coordinates: 43°19′07.05″N 11°20′01.01″E

The Loggia del Papa is a 15th-century Renaissance architecture, open-air arcade in piazza of the same name in Siena, region of Tuscany, Italy.

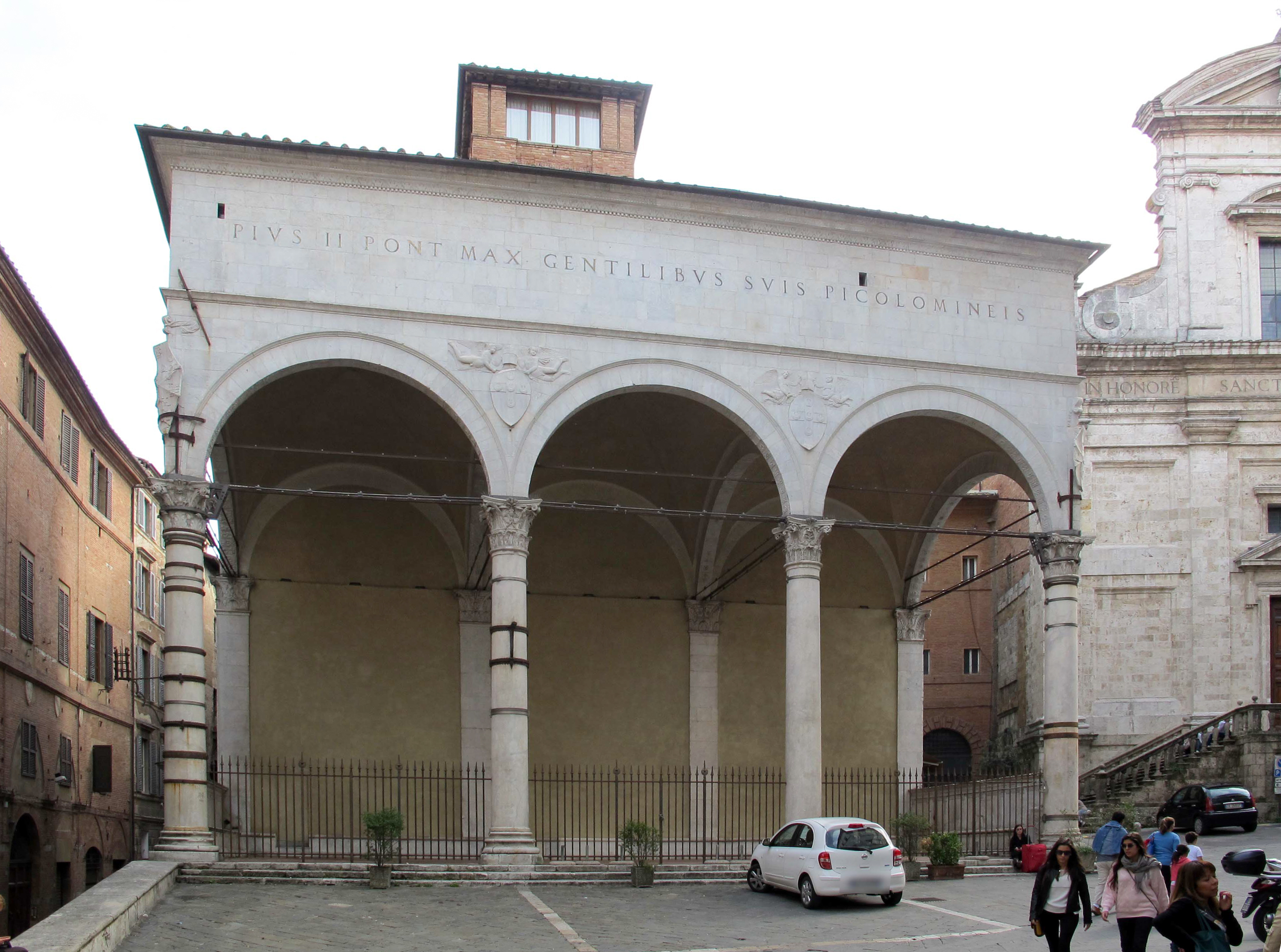
Loggia

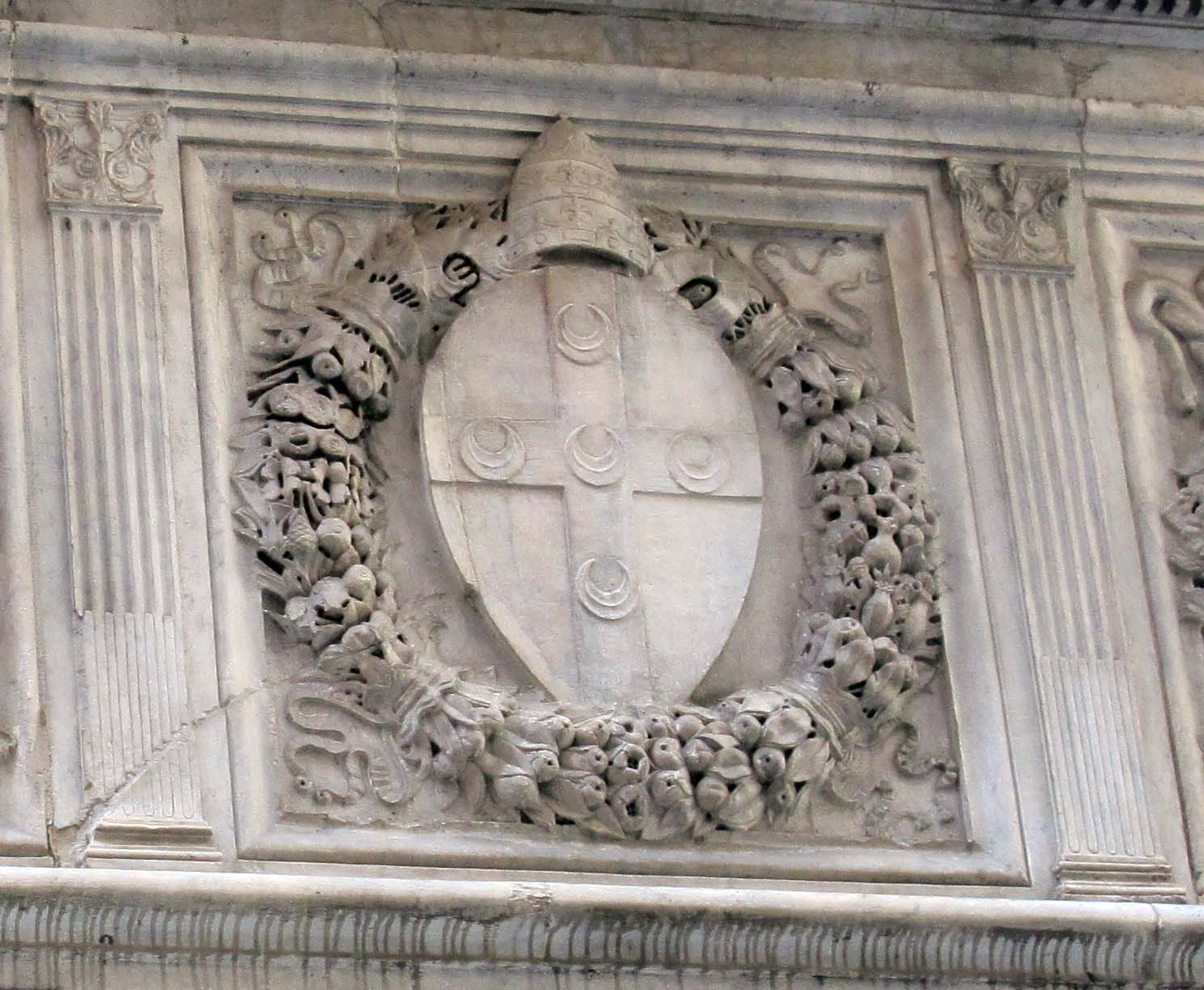
Coat of arms of Pius II with 5 crescents on cross surmounted by tiara.

The Loggia was erected by the Pope Pius II in honor of his family, whose Palazzo Piccolomini (delle Papesse) stands nearby on Banchi di Sotto, where it converts into Via di Pantaneto, that runs on the lower flank, to the left when facing the loggia. To the right is the baroque church of San Martino. The frieze reads Gentilibus suis Picolomineis (Family of Piccolomini). The design is attributed to Antonio Federighi. Construction began in 1462, and was completed within the year. The Via di Pantaneto flank of the loggia has a series of heraldic shields with the Piccolomini emblems, five supine crescent moons on a cross.
