= San Martino, Siena =

Church in Siena, Italy

Coordinates: 43°19′7.71″N 11°20′0.16″E

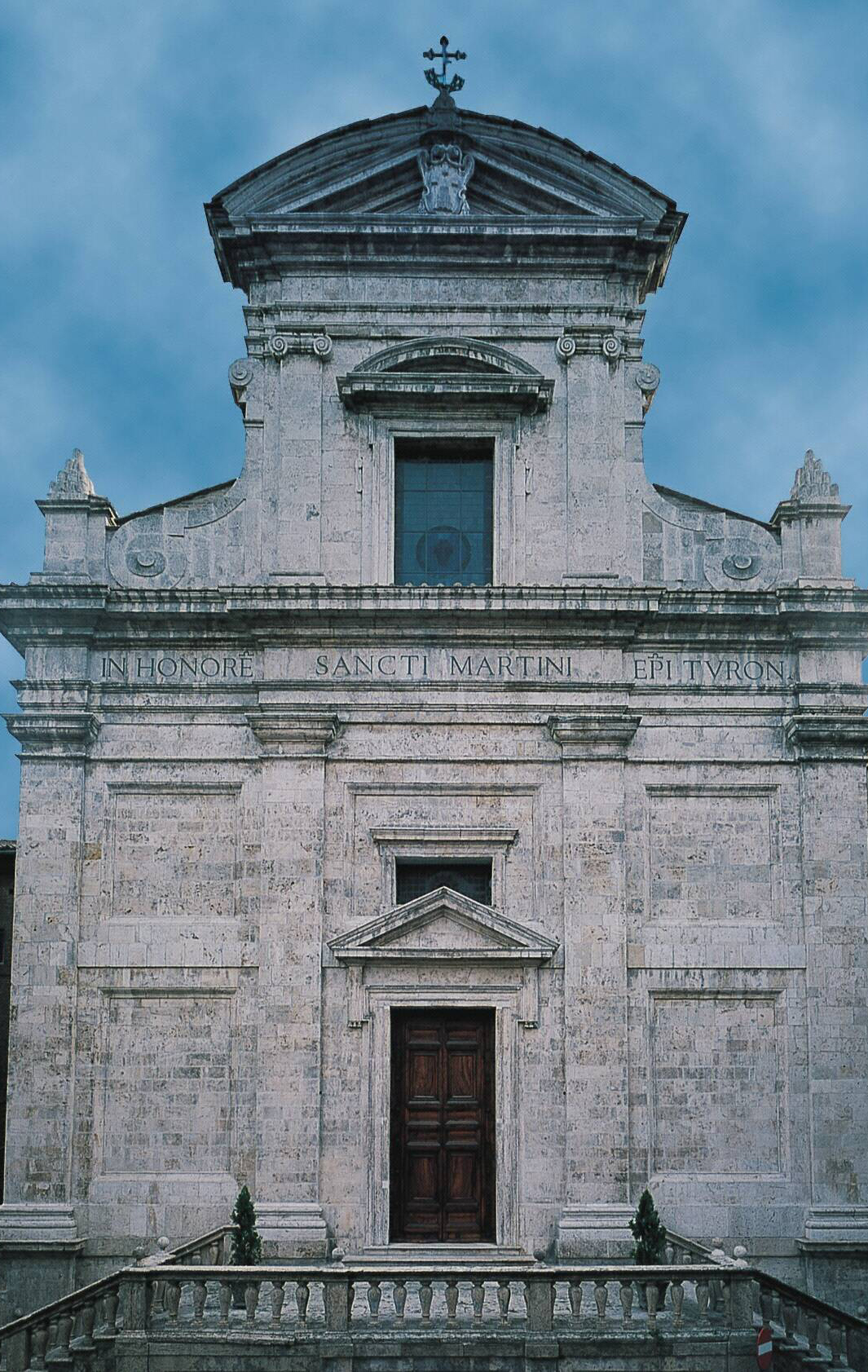
Façade

San Martino is a Roman Catholic church located on Via del Porrione, in the Terzo San Martino (named after this church) in central in Siena, region of Tuscany, Italy. Adjacent to the church is the Renaissance style Logge del Papa erected in 1462 by commission by Pope Pius II Piccolomini.

== History ==
A church at the site was present by the 12th century, but it was rebuilt and enlarged in the 16th century. The Baroque façade was built in 1613 and the bell tower completed in 1738.

The interior, in the counterfaçade, has a canvas of the Immaculate Conception Protecting Siena during the 1526 Battle of Camollia by Giovanni di Lorenzo, commissioned by the city's commune in 1528. In the chapels are, among the others: the Circumcision of Jesus, one of Guido Reni's masterworks, the Martyrdom of San Bartolomeo (1637) by Guercino and a Nativity by Domenico Beccafumi.

The presbytery's restoration in the 17th century was patronized by the de' Vecchi family, who commissioned the decorations to the Mazzuoli family. Giuseppe Mazzuoli completed the statue of St. Thomas of Villanova, and he helped his brother Giovanni complete the main altar.
