= Palazzo Piccolomini, Siena =

Coordinates: 43.319058°N 11.332813°E

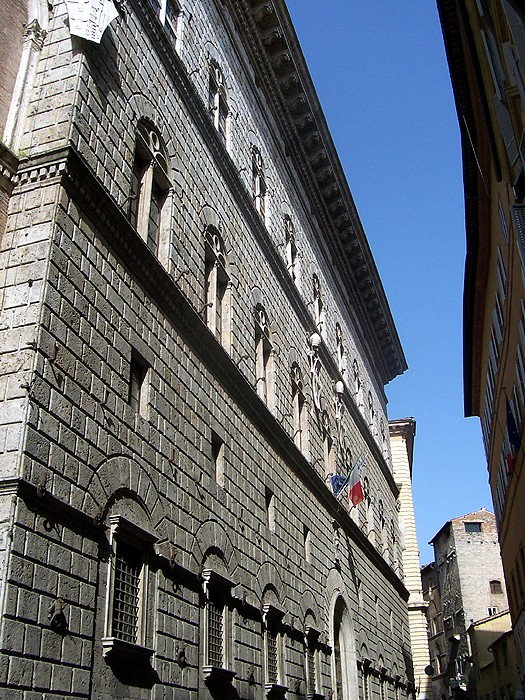
Palazzo Piccolomini

The Palazzo Piccolomini, also known as the Palazzo Todeschini Piccolomini, is a Renaissance-style palace in the city of Siena, region of Tuscany, Italy. It is located on the Banchi di Sotto, at the corner with Via Rinaldini; uphill and west of the church of San Martino, the Loggia del Papa, and the Palazzo delle Papesse, which also built by a Piccolomini family member. The palace houses the State Archives of Siena.

== History ==
The palace was erected by Giacomo and Andrea Piccolomini, nephews of Pope Pius II; the designs were requested from Bernardo Rossellino. Construction proceeded between 1460 and 1495. The palace recalls the Palazzi Medici Riccardi and Ruccellai in Florence, with the rough ashlar block surface and mullioned windows. The sculptural additions were completed by Antonio Federighi and Urbano da Cortona.

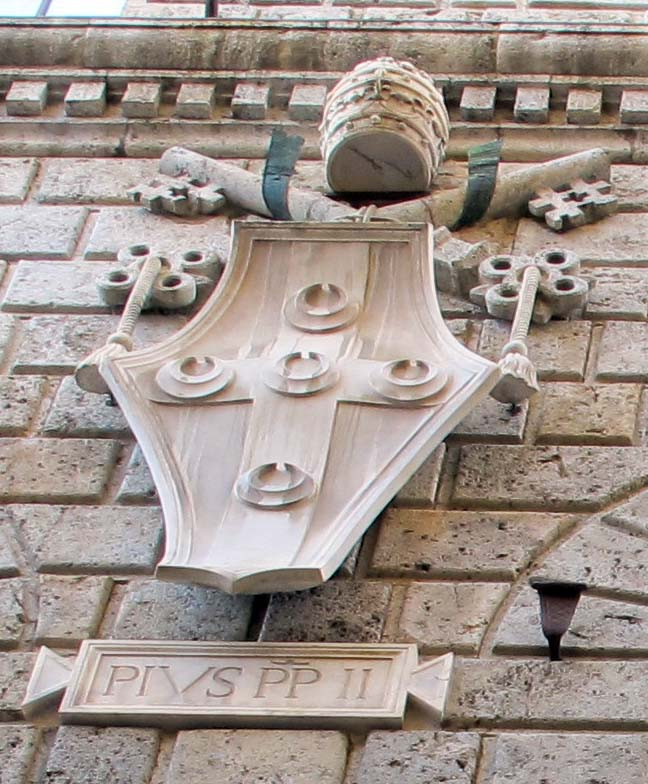
Above entrance, coat of arms of Piccolomini (Papal tiara and keys with tassel, plus shield with 5 crescents on a cross)

The palace was bought and refurbished by the Bank of Italy in 1884.

The Piano Nobile received some neo-Renaissance frescoes in the 19th century. The architect was Augusto Corbi. It now serves as a contemporary art gallery and museum. In the second floor, a terrace faces the roofs of the medieval town offering a great view of the Duomo, while on the highest point of the palace a rooftop loggia offers a view of the surrounding landscape.

There is also a Gothic-style Palazzo Piccolomini-Clementini across the street on Via di Banchi Sotto #75.

== See also ==
- Palazzo Piccolomini, Pienza
