= Fontana Maggiore =

Fountain in Perugia, Italy

Coordinates: 43.112192°N 12.38881°E

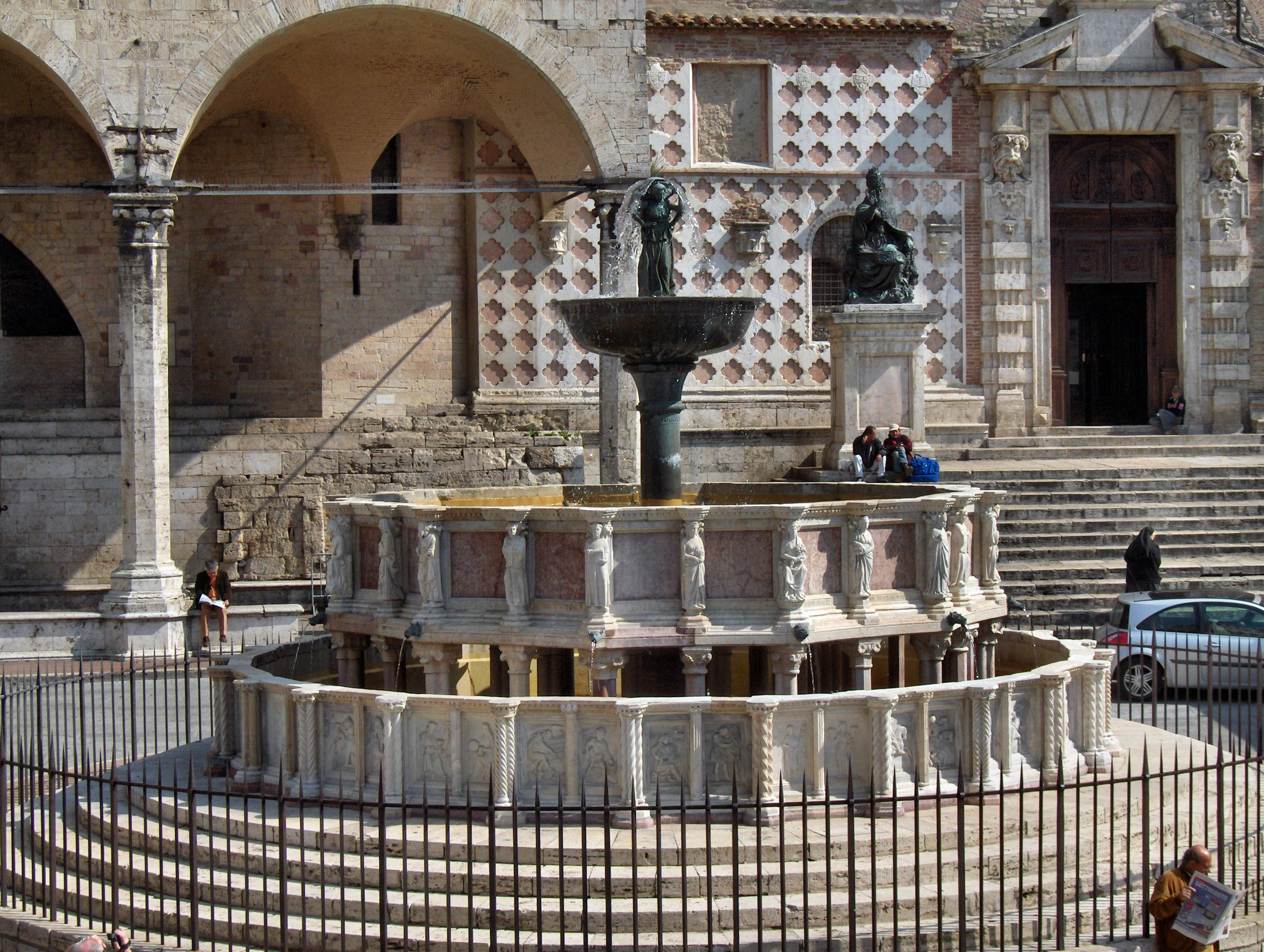
- Artists: Frà Bevignate da Cingoli, Boninsegna Veneziano, Rosso Padellaio, Nicola Pisano e Giovanni Pisano
- Year: 1275–1278
- Location: Piazza IV Novembre, Perugia

The Fontana Maggiore, a masterpiece of medieval sculpture, placed in the centre of Piazza IV Novembre (formerly Piazza Grande), is the monument symbol of the city of Perugia.

== History ==
The monumental fountain was designed by Frà Bevignate da Cingoli and built between 1275 and 1277 to celebrate the arrival of water in the acropolis of the city, by means of the new aqueduct. Bevignate cooperated with Boninsegna Veneziano, a hydraulic engineer, who accomplished an incredible audacious endeavour, being able to carry the water coming several kilometres from Mount Pacciano without the help of pumps. By means of a forced pressure duct, he managed to let the water flow uphill.

The marble reliefs were carved by the most important sculptors of the period: Nicola Pisano, in collaboration with his son Giovanni. The installation of the panels began in 1278. The upper basin in bronze with the three Graces or nymphs holding an amphora was created by Rosso Padellaio from Perugia.

The fountain was damaged by the earthquake of 1348, with the subsequent random reconstruction of the sequence of the panels; it was refurbished in 1948/49 by the architect Giuseppe Sacconi, and then again from 1995 to 1999.

The fountain inspired Jacopo di Grondalo for the construction of the Sturinalto Fountain of Fabriano in 1285.

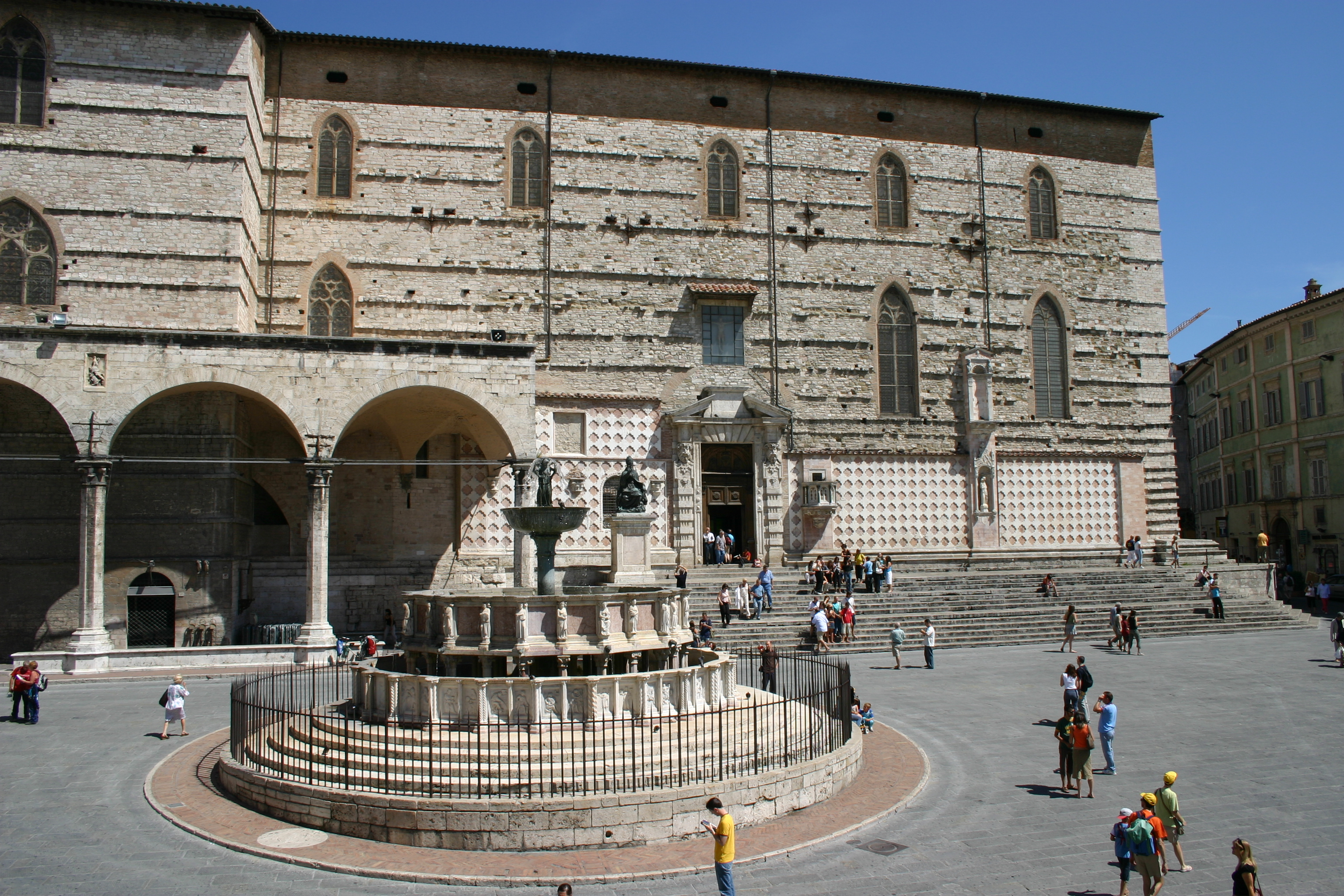
The fountain in Piazza IV Novembre

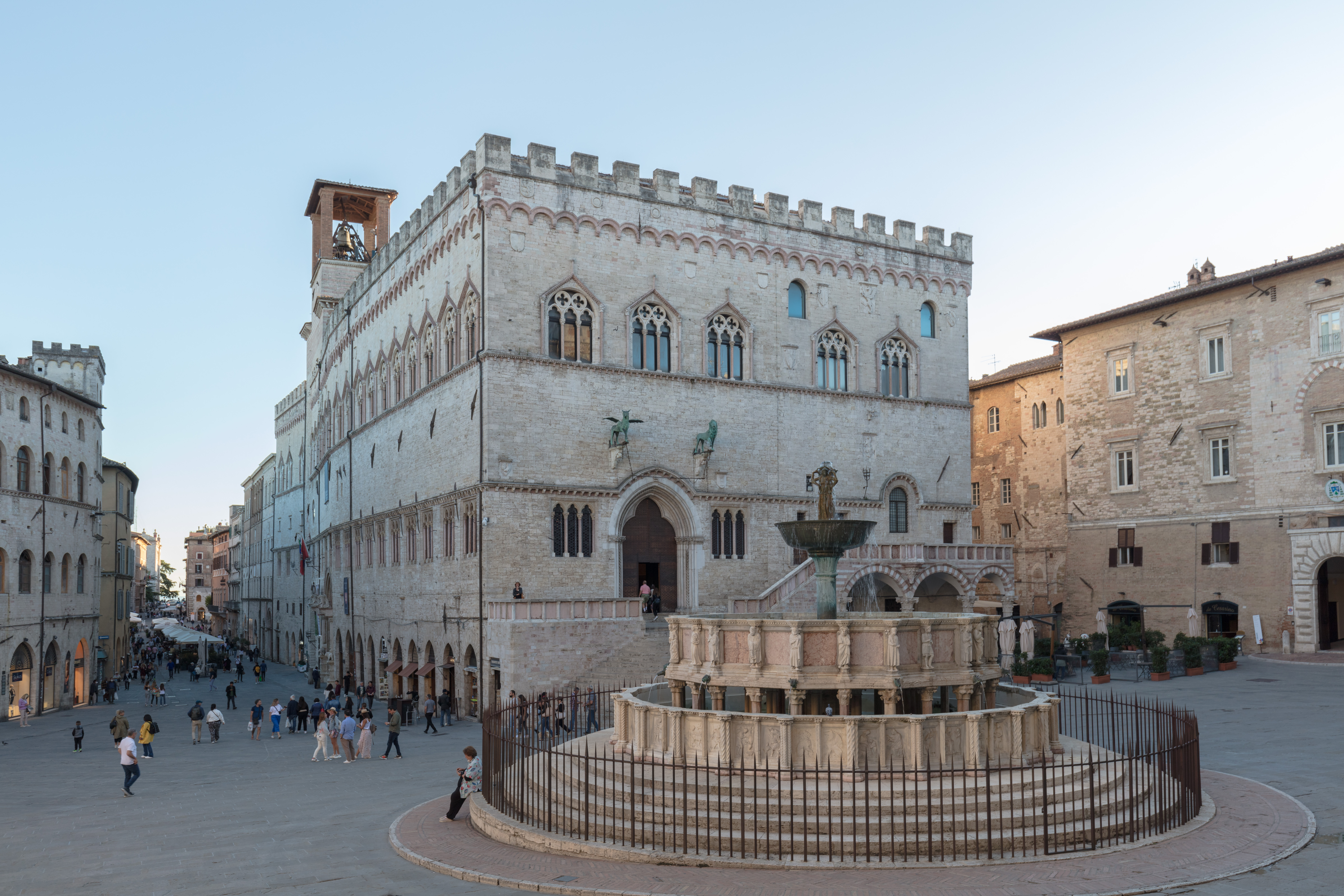
The fountain in front of the Palazzo dei Priori

== Description ==
The fountain made of stone from Assisi was prepared in a workshop and then assembled in the square. The fountain consists of two concentric polygonal marble basins, on top a bronze cup (by Rosso Padellaio) decorated in its center with a bronze group of three feminine figures (Charites, or perhaps nymphs) holding an amphora out of which the water pours down into the basins.

The lower basin is made up of 25 sides with compound columns at their edges, which have spiral fluting or other geometric pattern. Each compartment has two pictorial panels divided by a single column. The reliefs illustrate the annual cycle with twelve scenes of daily life and farm work characteristic for each month, and the adequate zodiac symbol added. As in other contemporary European art work, Labours of the Months are shown in a dignified manner. Here, manual labour is in fact represented alongside the arti liberali (liberal arts), figures from the Bible and the history of Rome. They are displayed in the following order:

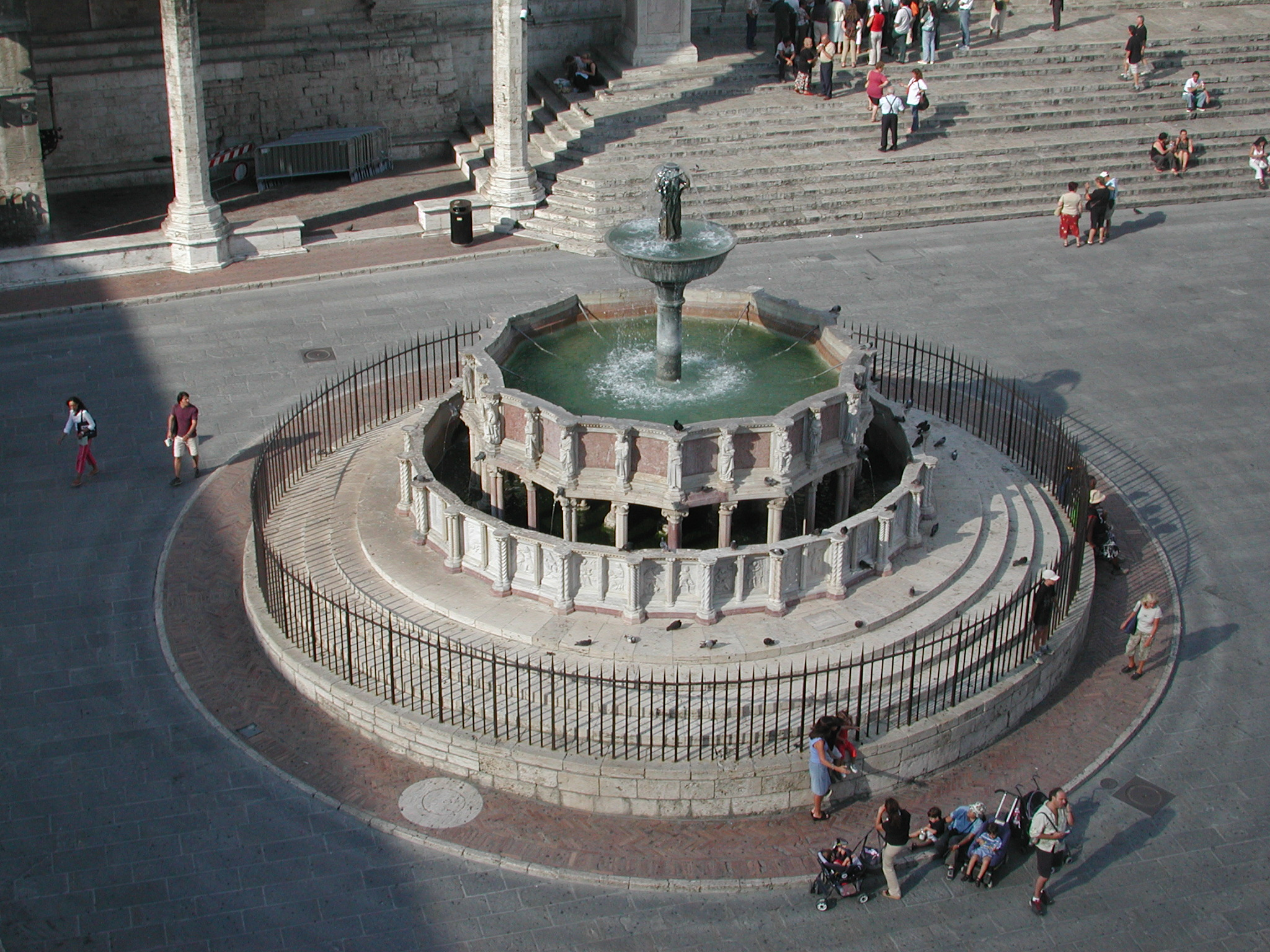
The fountain seen from above

- January – Aquarius – a gentleman and his wife at the hearth
- February – Pisces – two fishermen
- March – Aries – the spinario | the pruning of the vineyard
- April – Taurus – two allegories of spring
- May – Gemini – two Knights on Falconry
- June – Cancer – the harvest | flailing
- July – Lion – the wheat harvest | threshing of the wheat
- August – Virgo – the fig harvest (man | woman)
- September – Libra – the crushing of must | the grape harvest
- October – Scorpion – the filling up of casks | the construction of casks
- November – Sagittarius – the ploughing | the sowing
- December – Capricorn – the slaughter of the pork
- The Guelph lion | the Griffin of Perugia
- Grammar | Dialectic
- Rhetoric | Arithmetic
- Geometry | Music
- Astronomy | Philosophy
- Two eagles (the one on the right bears the signature of Giovanni Pisano)
- The Original Sin | the Expulsion from Eden
- Samson kills the lion | Samson and Delilah
- Davide triumphant | Golia defeated
- Romulus and Remus (represented as two falconers)
- The she-wolf that fed Romulus, Remus | their mother Rhea Silvia
- The Fox and the Crane | The Wolf and the Lamb, two fables by Aesop
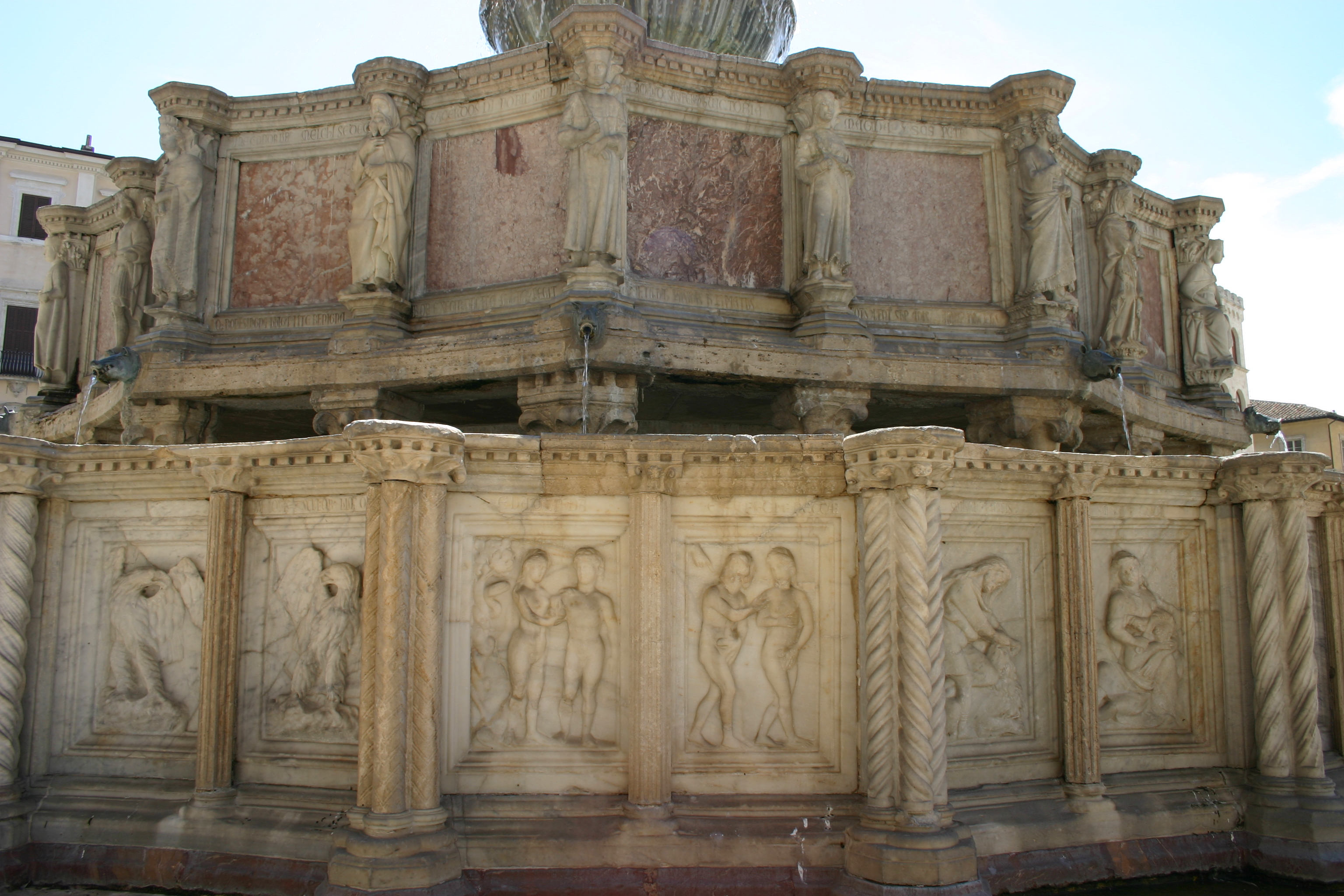
Detail of Fontana Maggiore

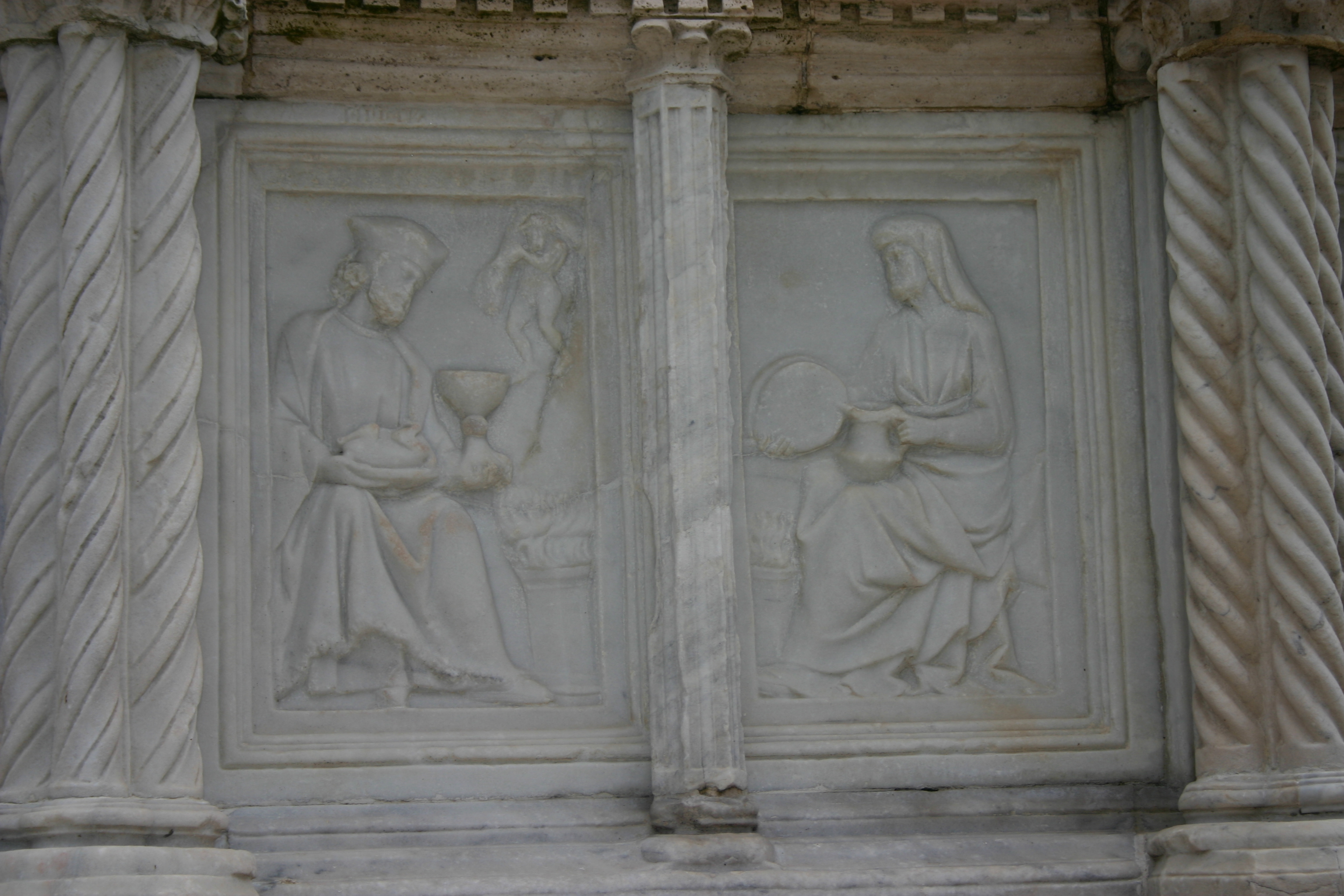
Aquarius and the month of January

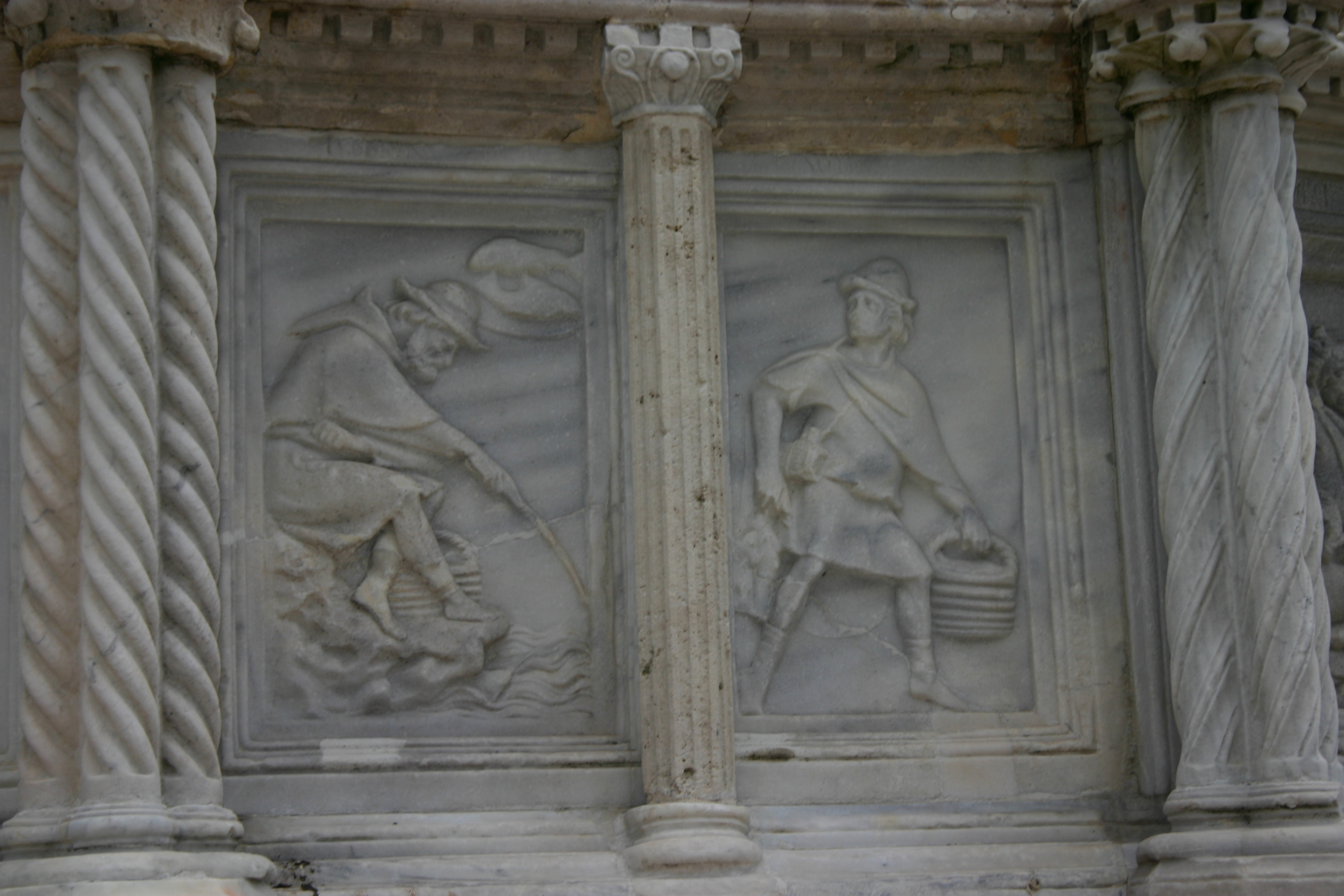
The fishermen and the month of February

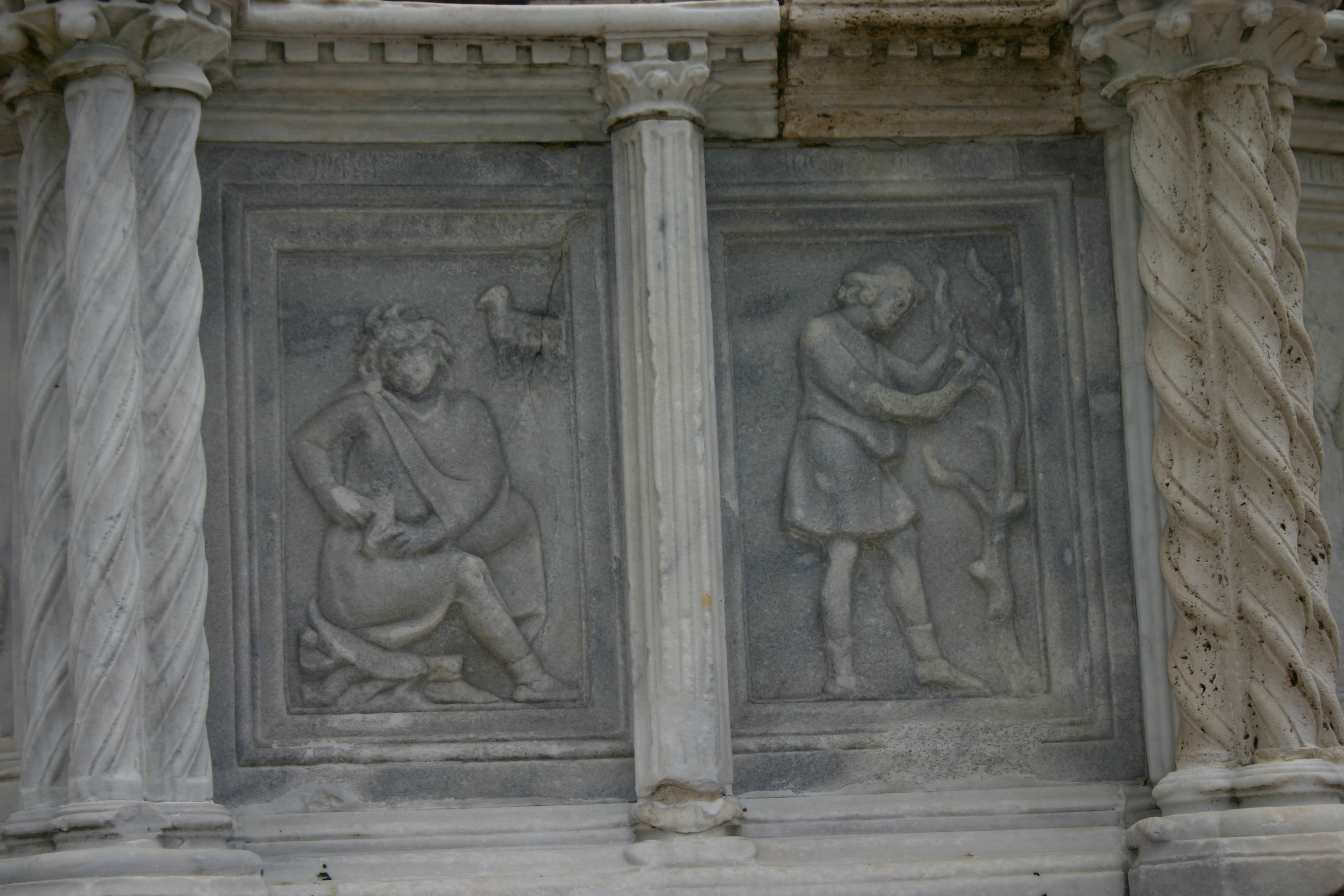
The "Spinario", the Aries and the month of March

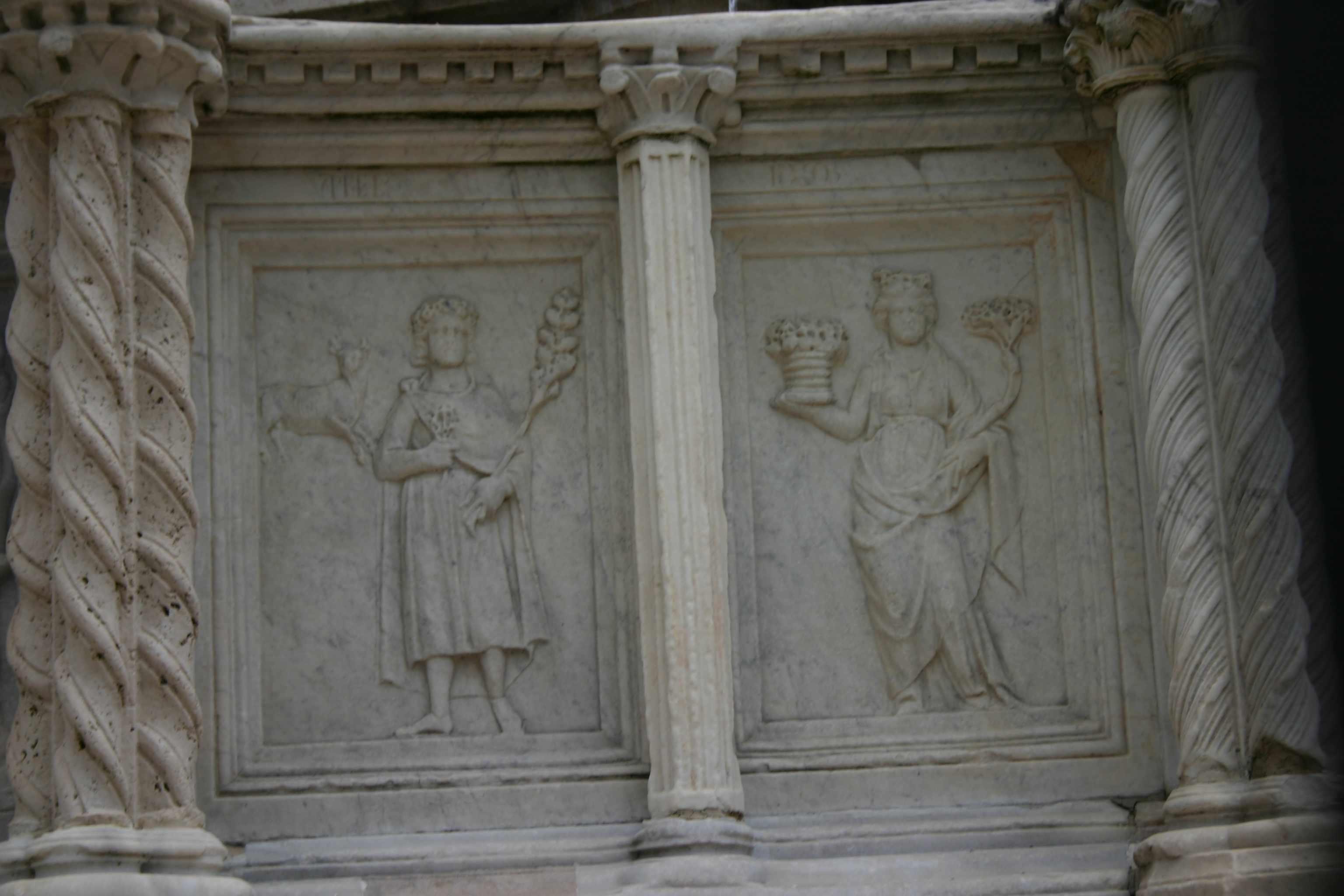
The allegories of spring and the Taurus for the month of April

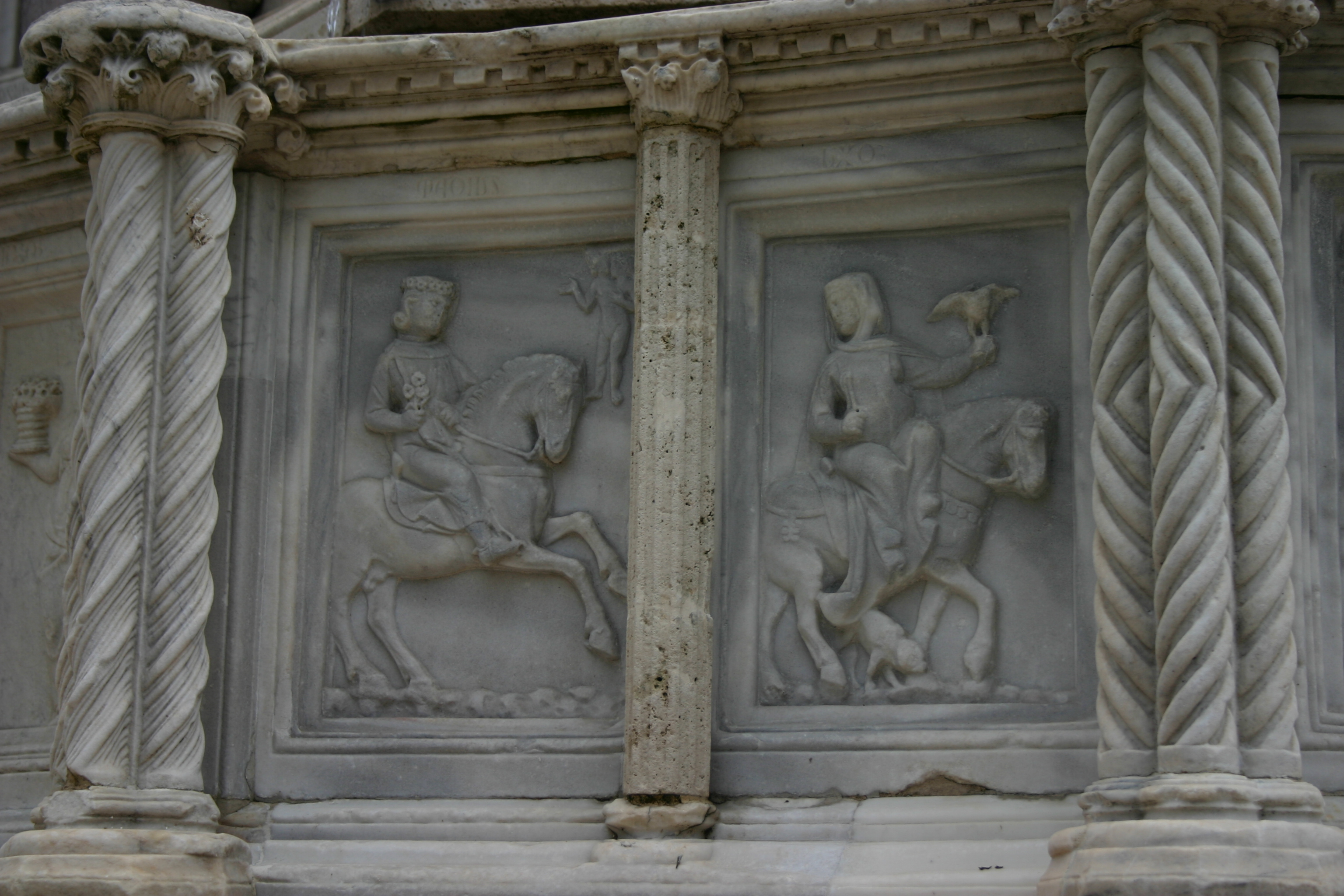
Two Falconers for the month of May

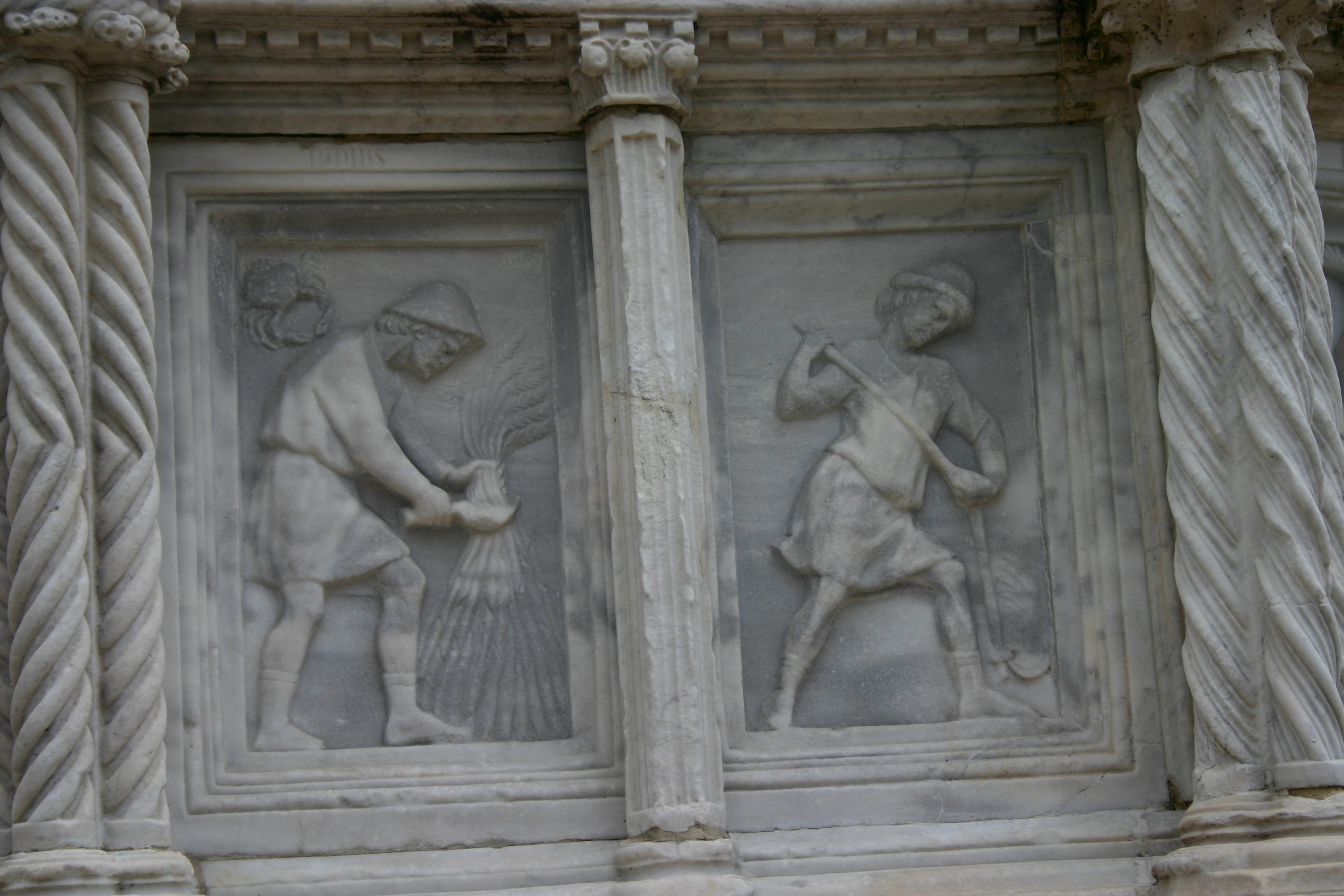
The harvest and the month of June

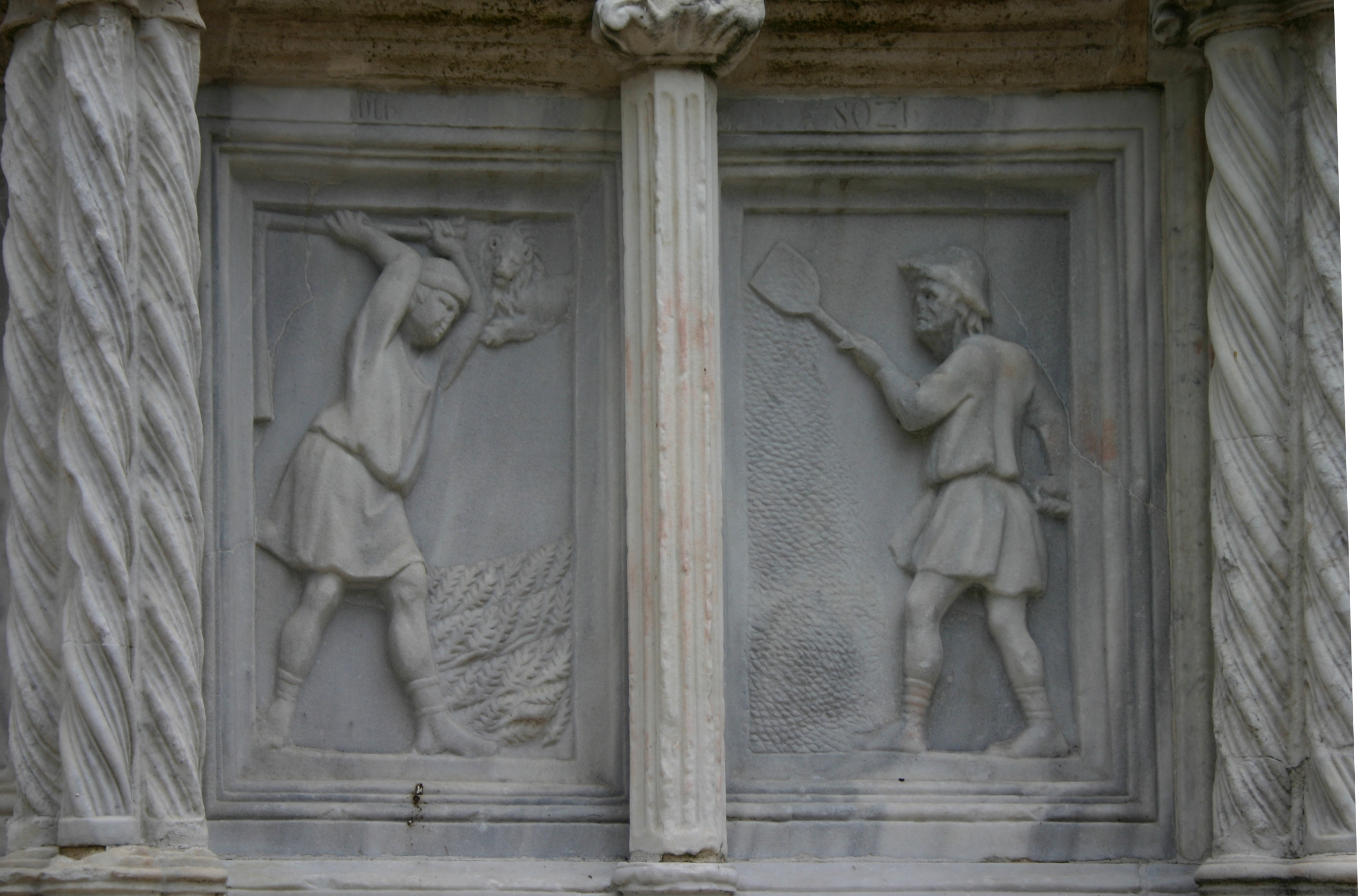
The flailing and the threshing of wheat in July

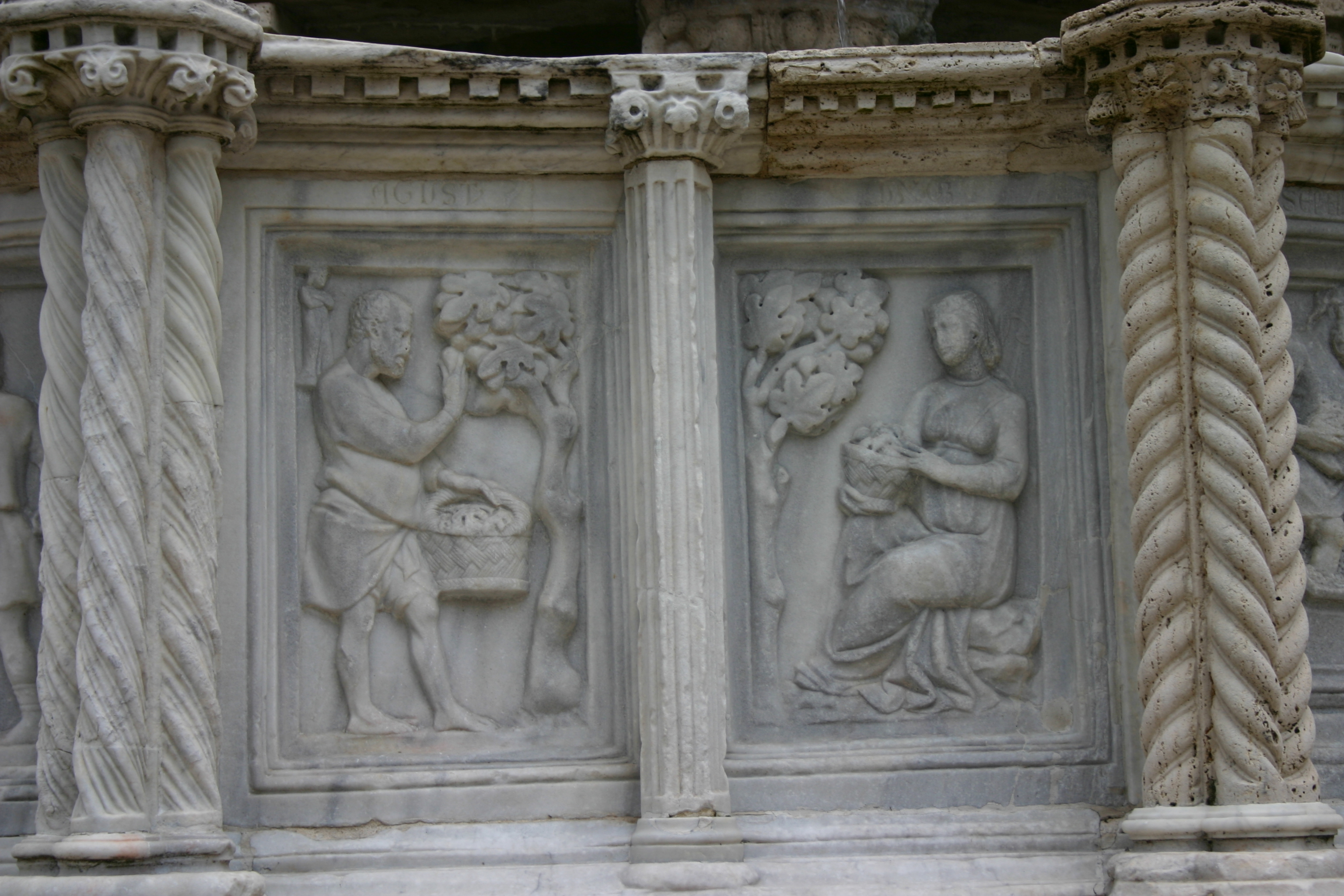
The fig harvest in August

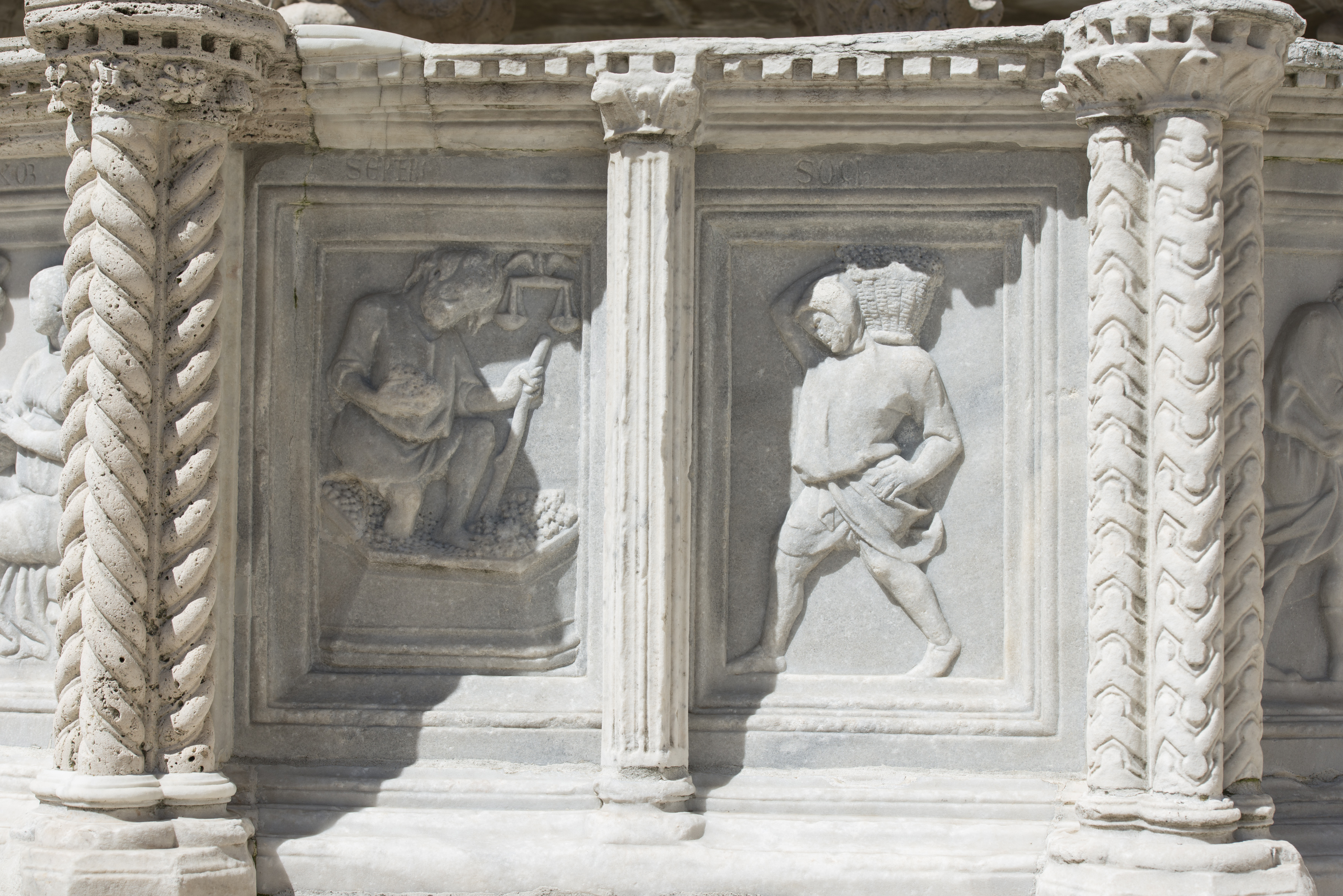
The harvest and crushing of grapes in September

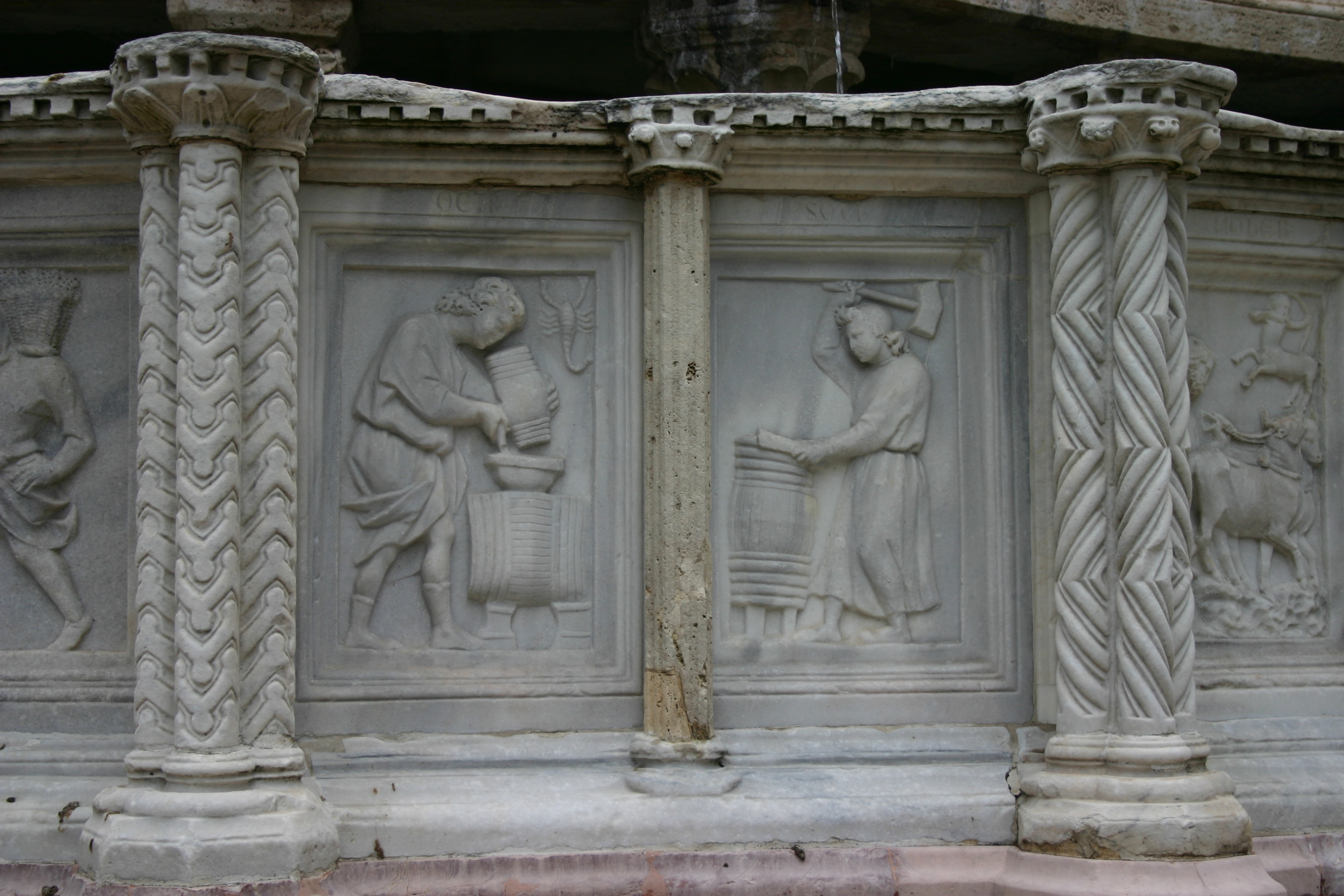
The preparation of wine in October

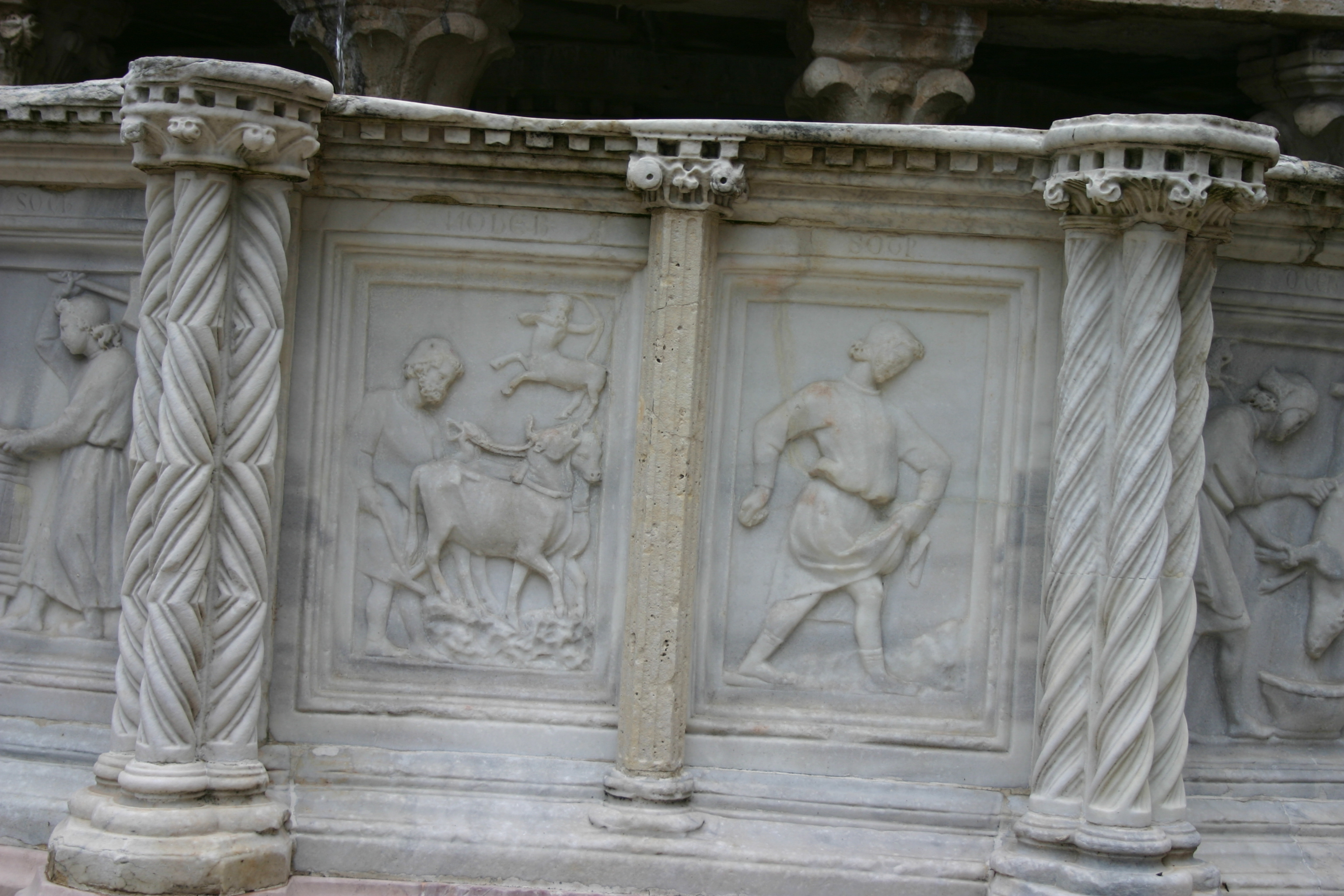
The ploughing and sowing - November

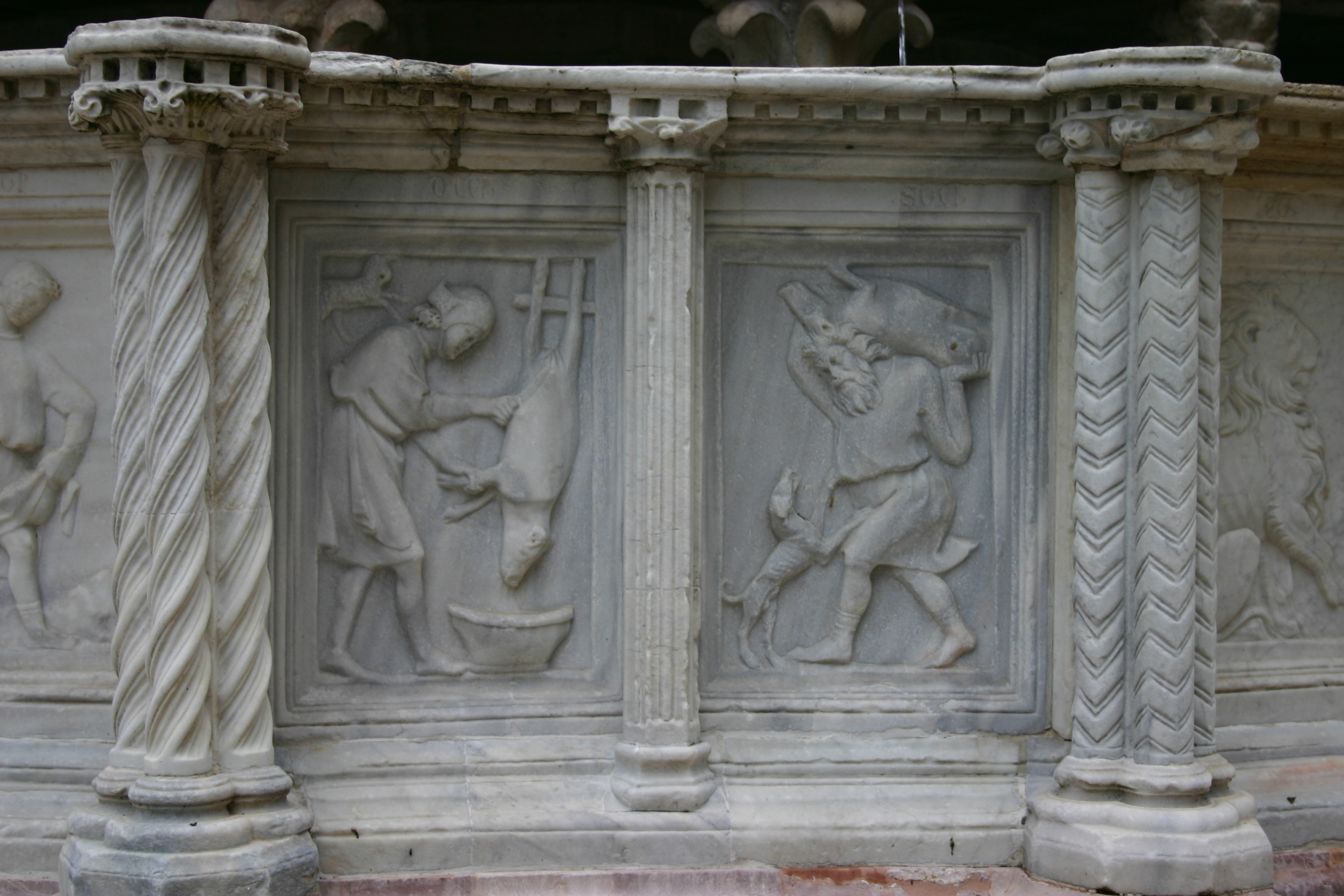
The slaughter of the pork in December

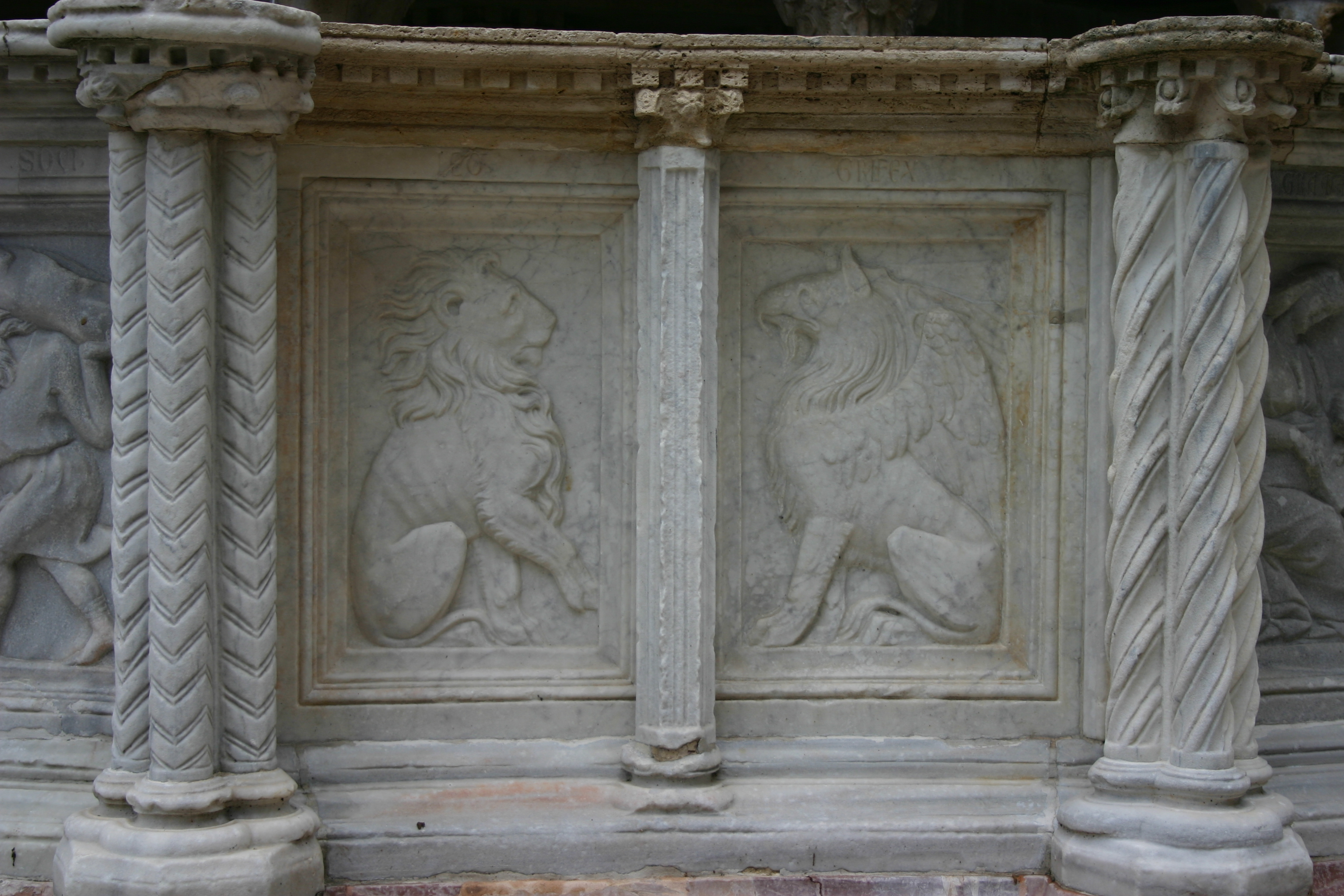
Griffin and Lion, symbols of the city

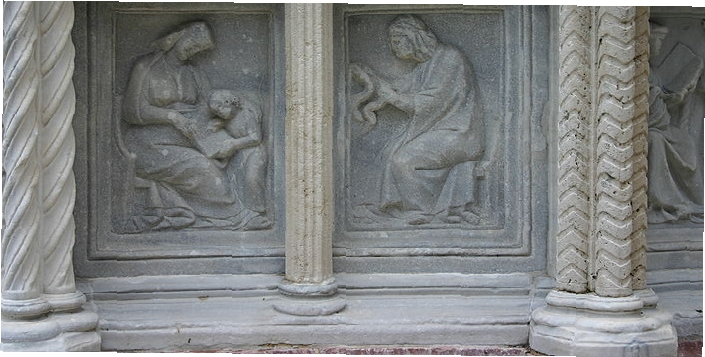
Grammar and Dialectic

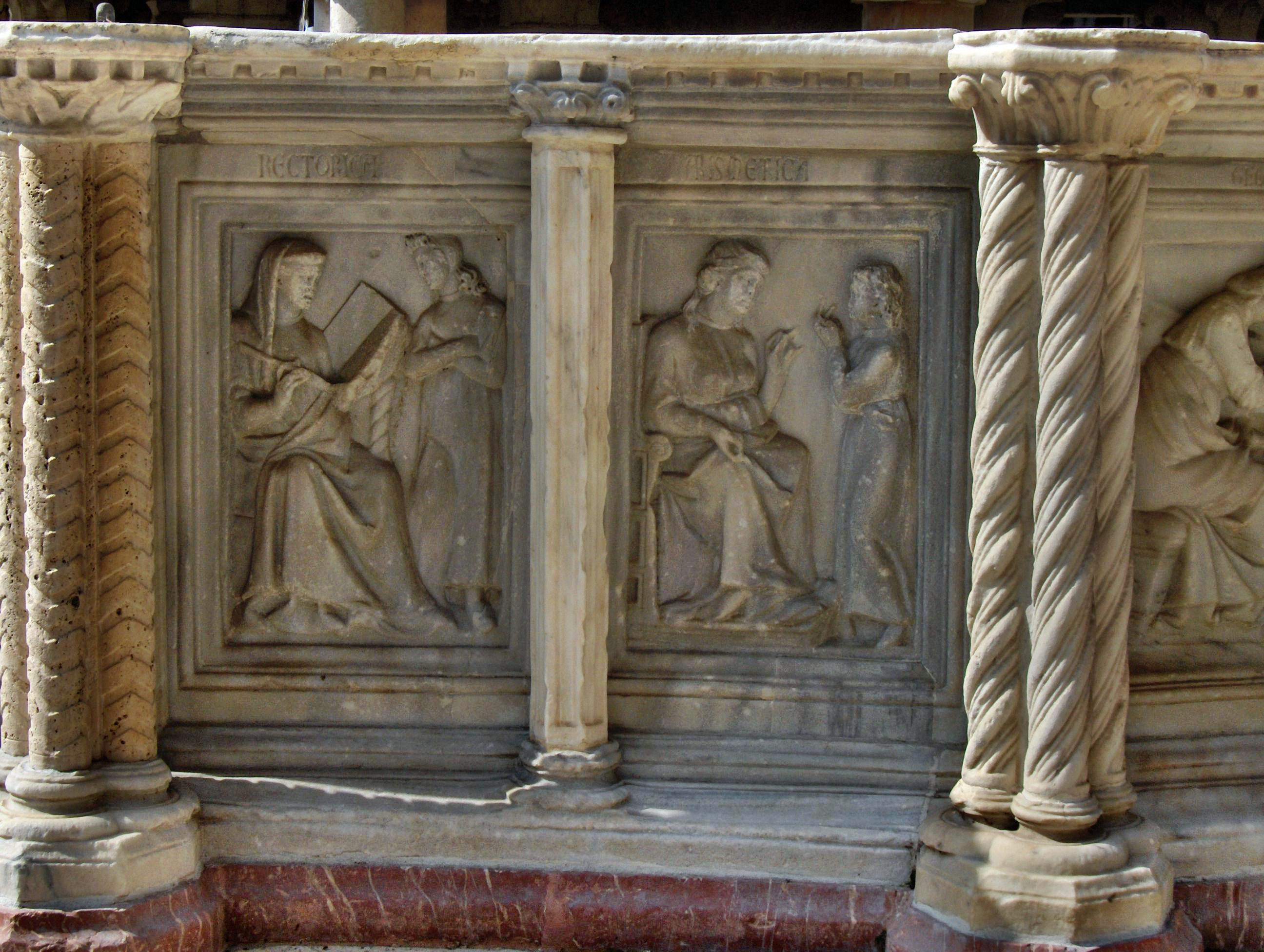
Rhetoric and Arithmetic

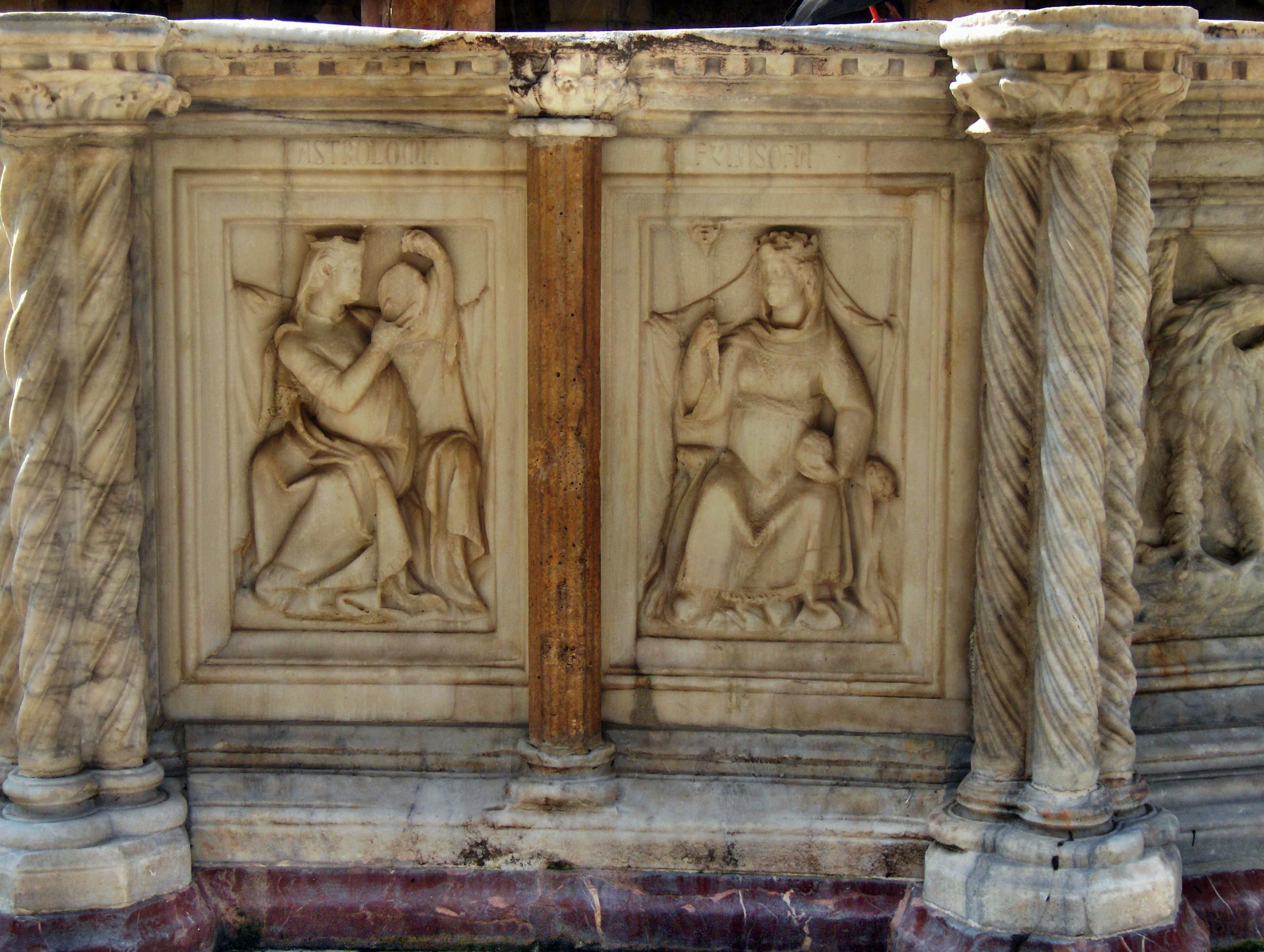
Astronomy and Philosophy

The upper basin is supported by alternating compound columns and single columns, only slightly higher than the parapet of the ground basin. At each of its 24 edges standing figures represent saints and mythological and biblical characters from the New and Old Testament. As in the lower basin, no distinction is made between the new Judeo-Cristian civilization and the ancient Roman heritage, they are harmonized and placed in continuity. The basin can be seen as a wind rose, where at each cardinal point there are relevant characters; i.e., the representation of Augusta Perusia, the Roman name of Perugia, with the cornucopia on her lap, which draw nourishment from the ears of wheat brought by the lady of Chiusi (once the granary of Perugia) and from the fish offered by Domina lacus, the nymph of the Lake Trasimeno. Then follow all the characters related to the city. In the opposite cardinal point, to the North, Euliste, the legendary founder of Perugia is depicted. To the West, Rome, related to the representation of the Roman Church and of Divinitas excelsa and of Saints Peter and Paul. Another important character to the East is Saint John the Baptist for the role of the water as an essential and sacred element; it is also associated with Salome and other biblical characters.

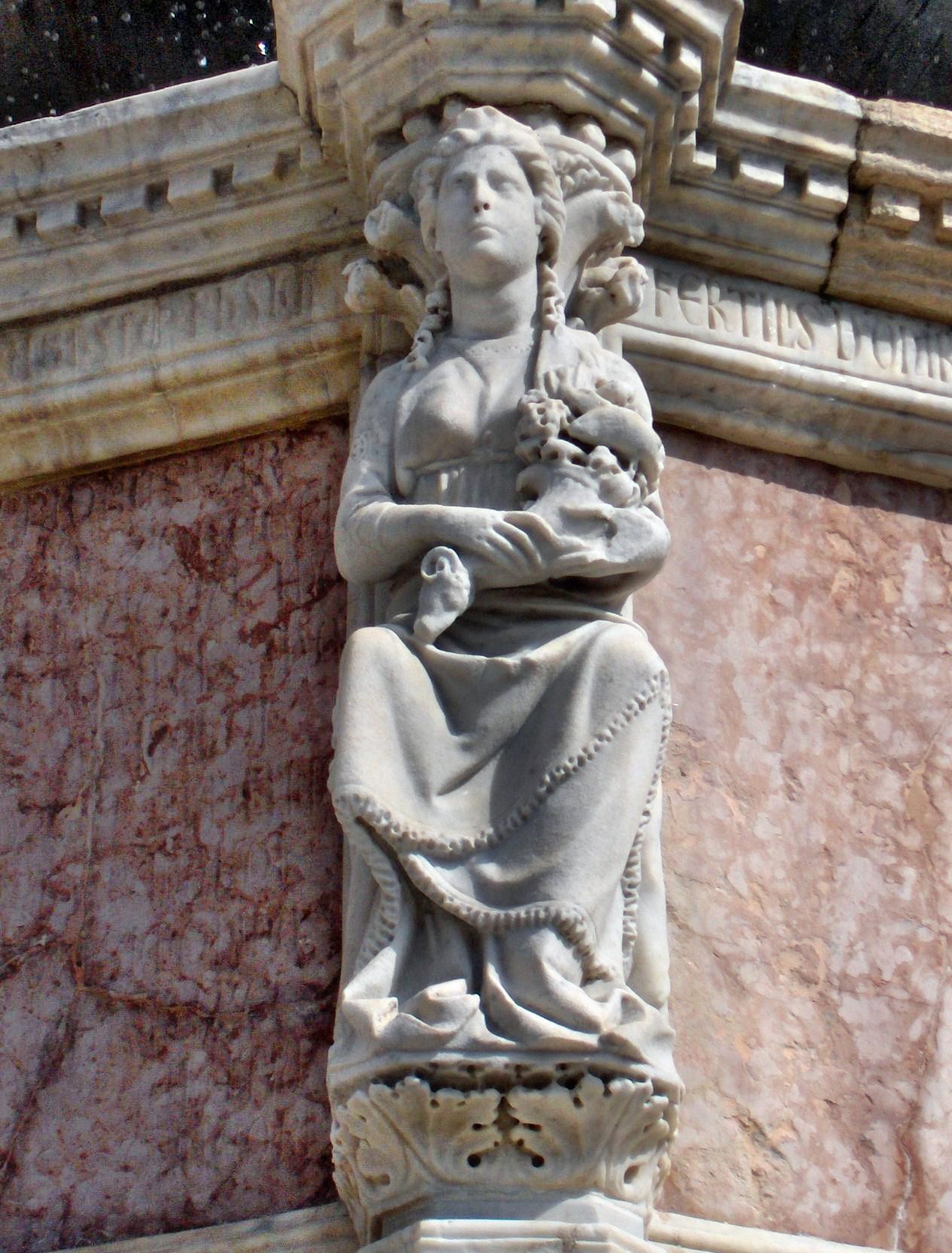
The personification of Perugia

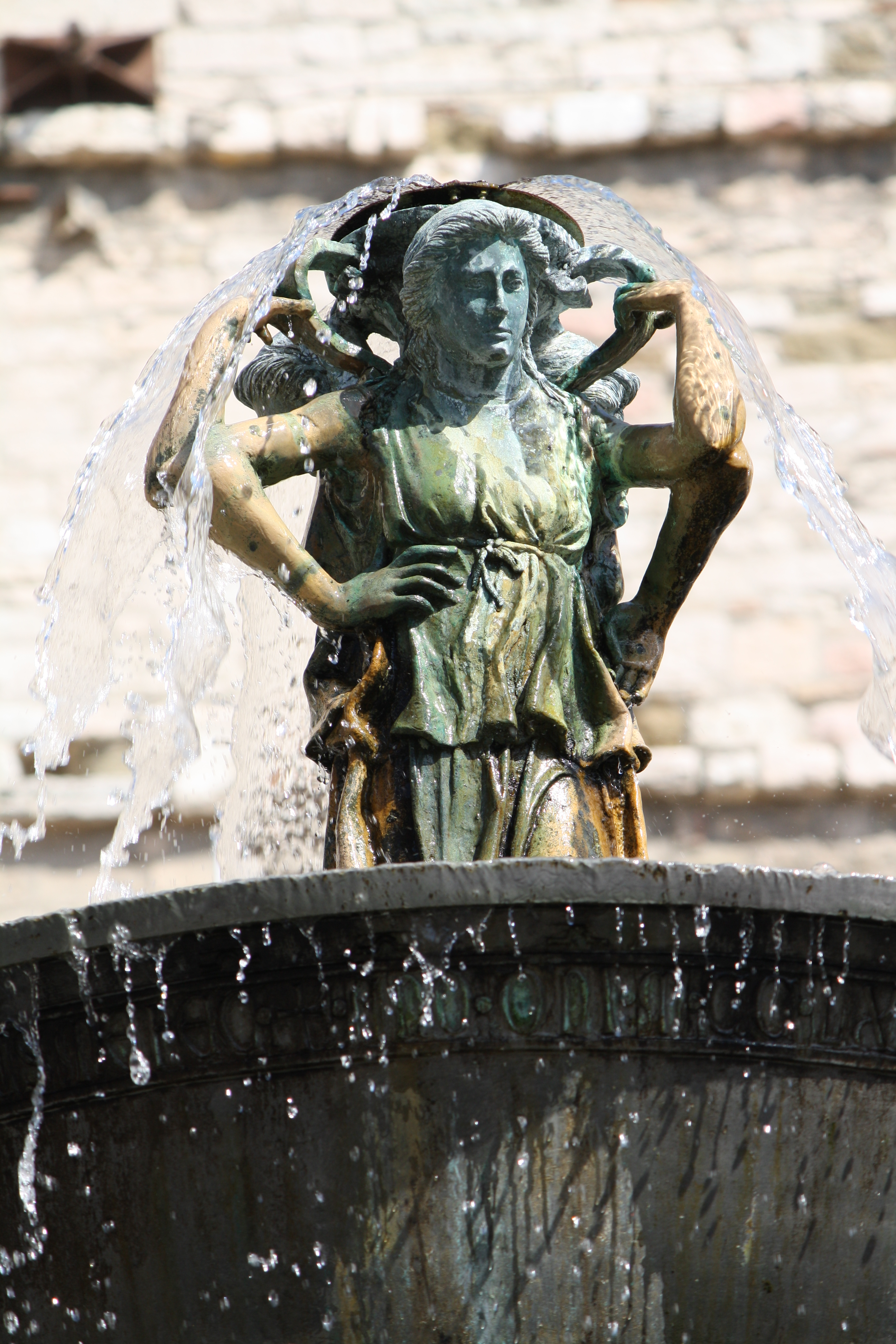
The three Graces or nymphs providing the water

The 24 statues represent:

- Saint Peter
- The Church of Rome
- Roma caput mundi ("Rome, capital of the world")
- Divinitas excelsa
- Saint Paul
- A Cleric of the Cathedral San Lorenzo
- Saint Lawrence, patron saint of the city
- The nymph of Chiusi (Roman Domina Clusi)
- Augusta Perusia (the Roman name of Perugia in honor of Emperor Augustus)
- Domina lacus, the nymph of the Lake Trasimeno, who offers the fish to Perugia
- San Ercolano di Perugia (Saint Hercules), patron saint of the city
- The Cleric traitor of San Ercolano
- Saint Benedict
- Salome
- John the Baptist
- Solomon
- David
- Moses
- Matteo da Correggio, podestà of Perugia
- The Archangel Michael
- Euliste, the legendary founder of Perugia
- Melchizedek
- Ermanno da Sassoferrato, capitano del popolo
- Victoria

In the lower frame of the second basin, Latin verses are carved; epigraphic abbreviations provide information on the authors and the date of the sculpture, and they are an invitation to examine and interpret the fountain: Guarda tu che passi questa fontana dal lieto mormorio, se osservi bene puoi vedere cose mirabili…. ("Look, you who pass by this fountain with its babbling, if you look closer you can see wonderful things.")

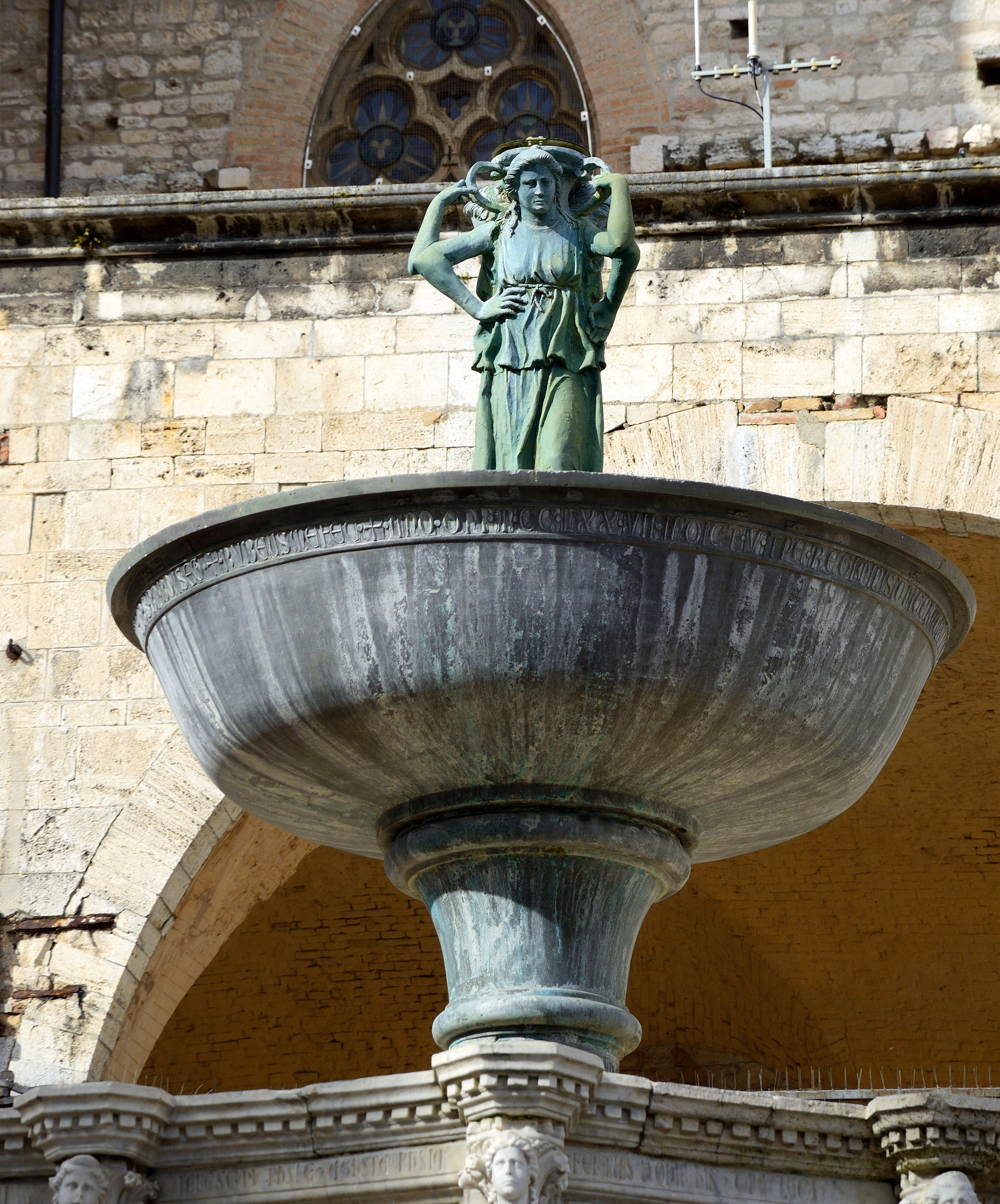
The bronze cup with the three nymphs

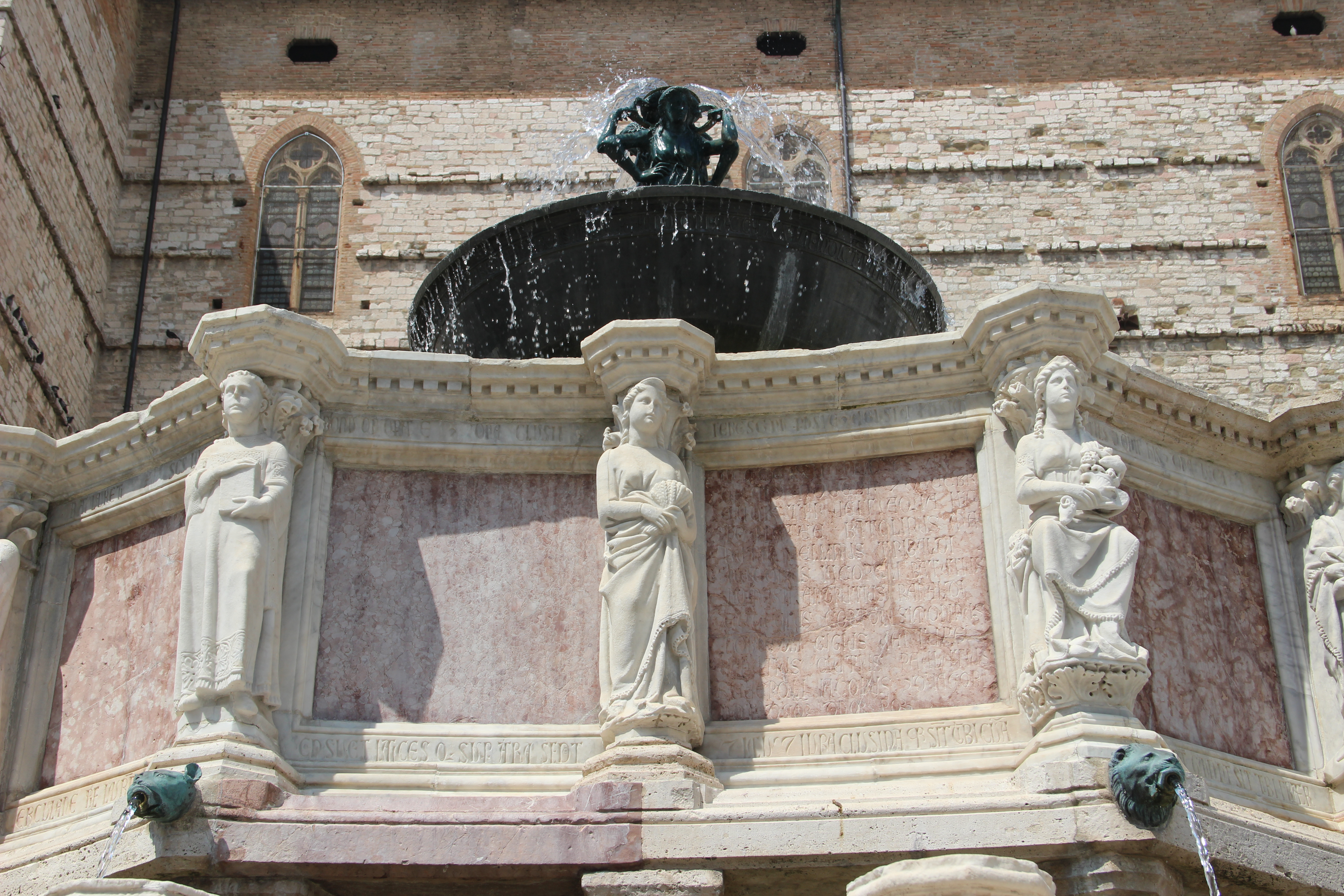
San Lorenzo, Domina Clusi and Augusta Perusia

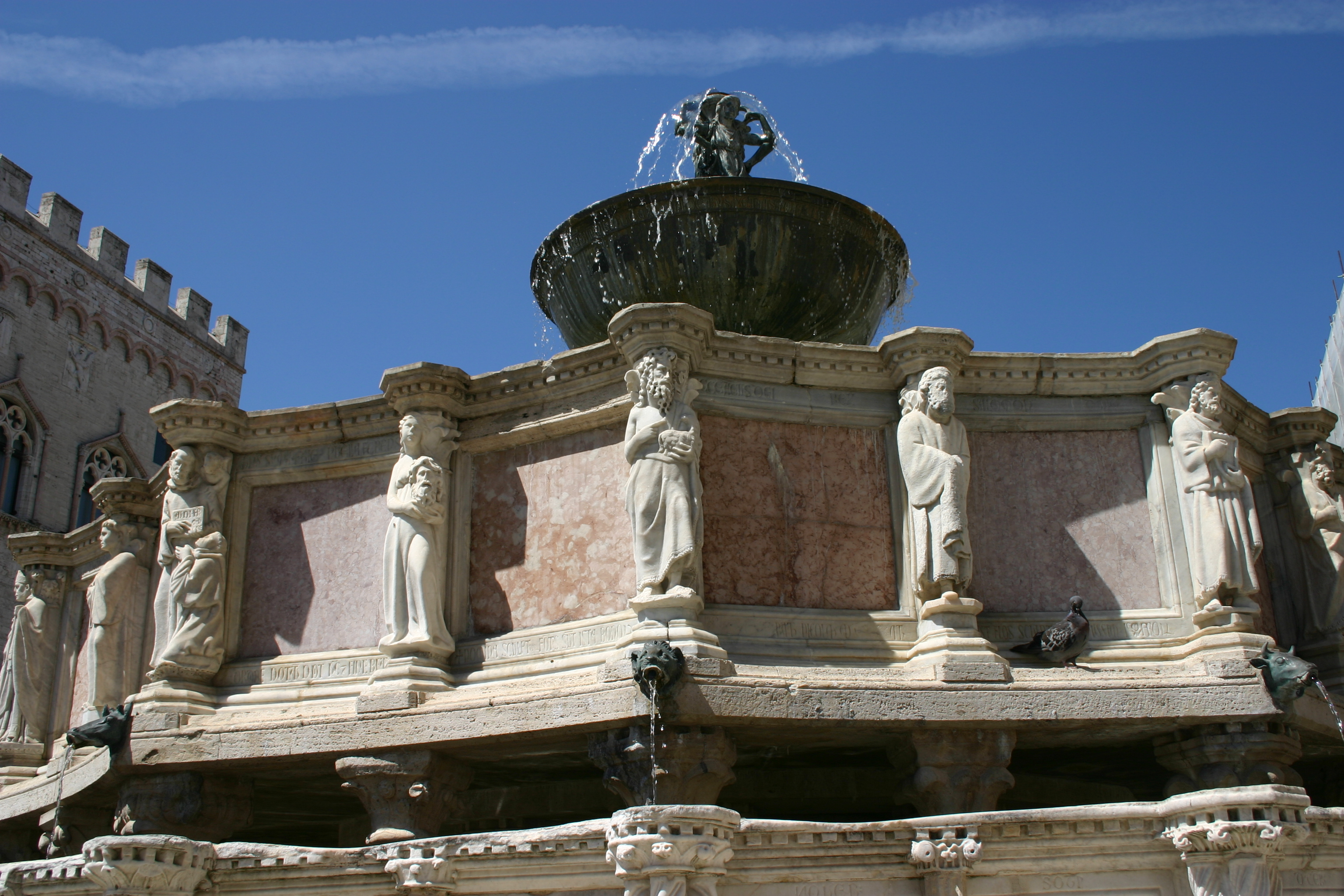
Saint Benedict, Salome, John the Baptist, Salomon and David

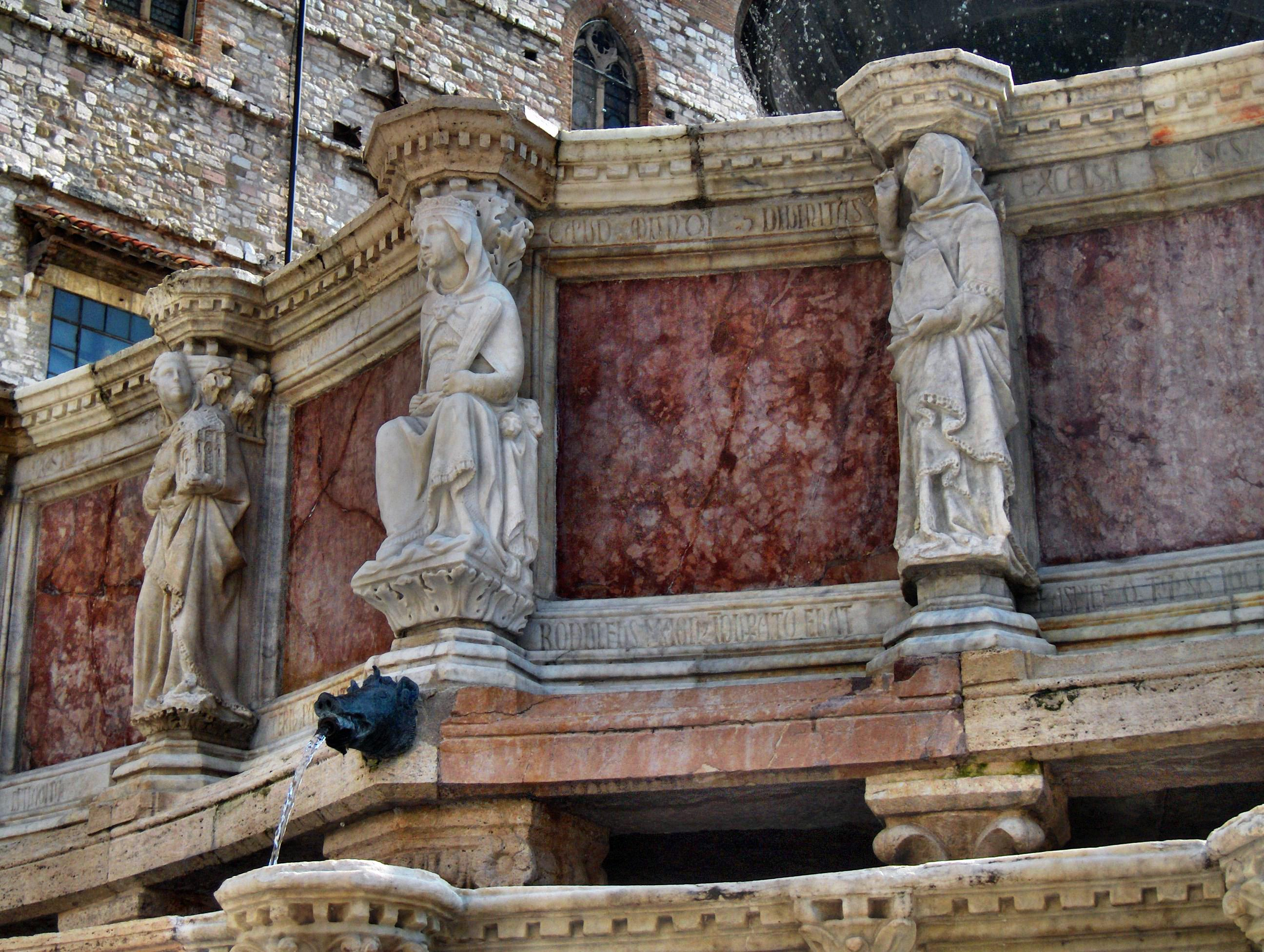
The church, Rome and theology

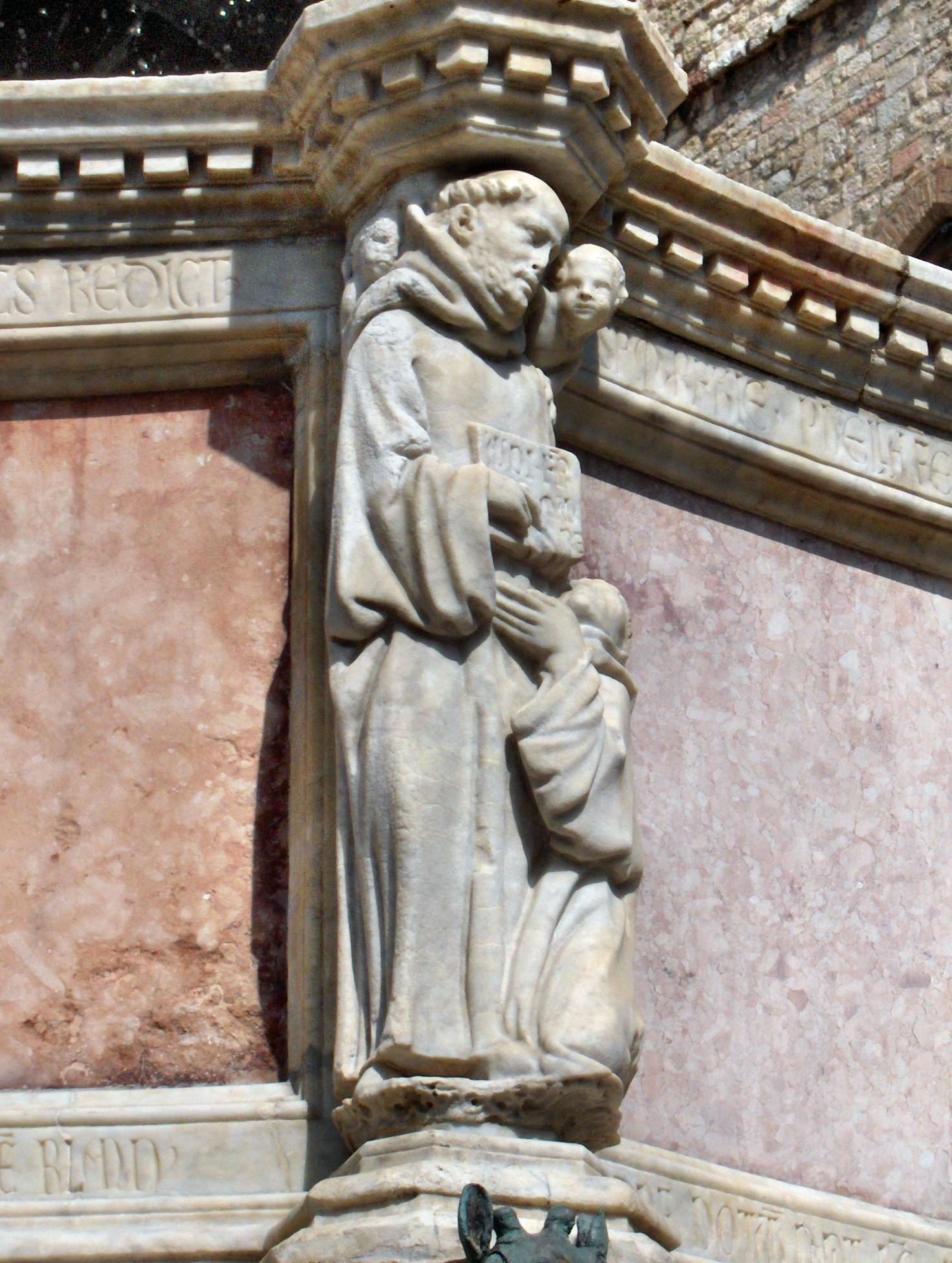
Saint Benedict

== Stamp ==
In 1974, the Poste italiane (Italian Mail) dedicated a 40 Lire stamp (ex-Italian currency) to the Fontana Maggiore, as part of a series of Italian fountains, Fontane d’Italia.

== In popular culture ==
Netflix series Can This Love Be Translated? which follows the romance between interpreter Joo Ho-jin and actress Cha Mu-hee, was filmed near the fountain and the adjacent plaza in early December 2024.

== See also ==
- Perugia
- Piazza IV Novembre

== Bibliography ==
- Touring Club Italiano-La Biblioteca di Repubblica (2004). L'Italia: Umbria. Touring editore.
- Vignaroli, Francesco (2012). Fontana vivace. La Fontana Maggiore di Perugia. Florence: Società Editrice Fiorentina.
