= Labours of the Months =

Medieval term for work done in specific months of the year, often used in art

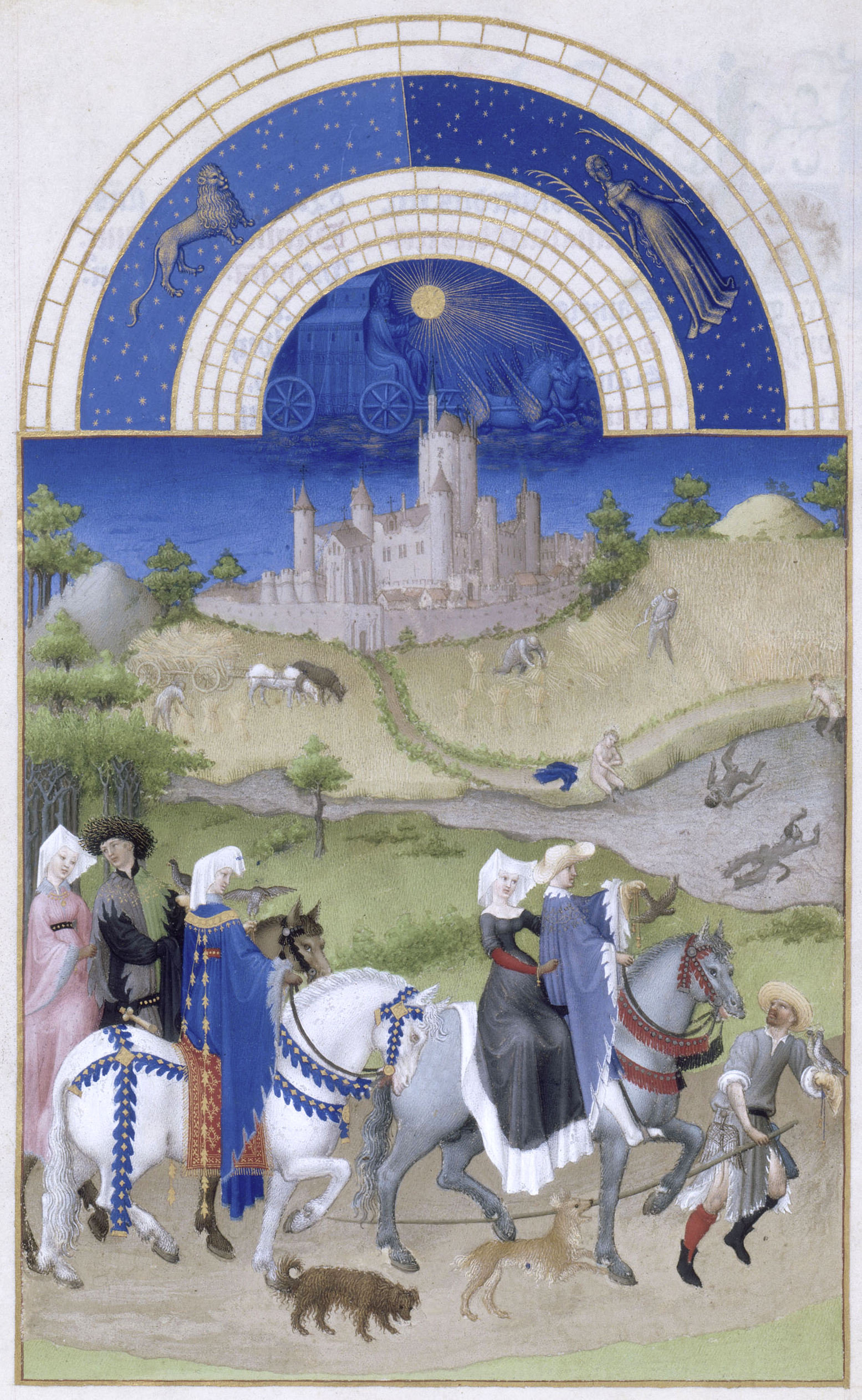
August from the Très Riches Heures du Duc de Berry, 1412-16, by the Limbourg brothers; the court hunt with falcons and behind peasants harvest crops. The Duc's castle at Étampes is at the rear. 22,5 x 13,6 cm

The term Labours of the Months refers to cycles in Medieval and early Renaissance art depicting in twelve scenes the rural activities that commonly took place in the months of the year. They are often seen as humankind's response to God's ordering of the Universe, and linked to the signs of the Zodiac, as both visually represent the passage of time in a yearly cycle.

They are frequently found as part of large sculptural schemes on churches, and in illuminated manuscripts, especially in the calendars of late medieval Books of Hours. The manuscripts are important for the development of landscape painting, containing most of the first painting where this was given prominence. The most famous cycle is that painted in the early 15th century by the Limbourg brothers in Très Riches Heures du Duc de Berry. In the early 16th century, long after the genre was established, the miniaturist Simon Bening produced cycles which link the Limbourgs with the landscape paintings of Pieter Bruegel the Elder.

== Origins and Significance ==
Artistic representations of the months of the year date back to antiquity, when the months were represented through personifications. By the 12th century, the Labours of the Months had fully replaced these portrayals, reflecting religious and cultural changes in European society at the time.

The purpose or meaning behind art depicting the Labours of the Months can vary. However, the monthly labours' original meaning was likely derived from the Christian belief in hard work as penance for (and redemption from) humanity's sins.

== Typical cycle ==
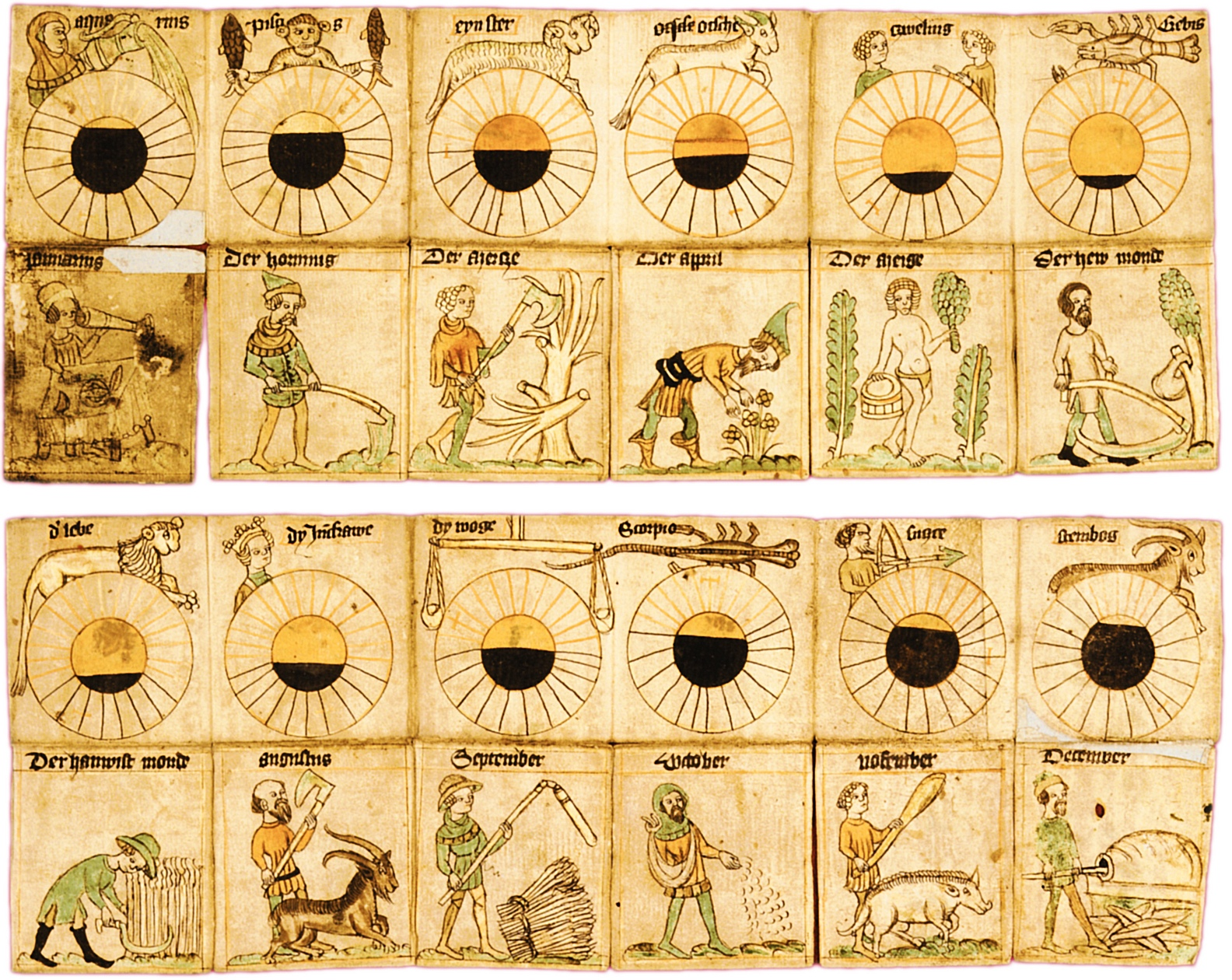
Set of single figure images, German c. 1400

The contents of cycles varied with date, location, and the purpose of the work. The Très Riches Heures du Duc de Berry (illustrated right) was designed for the personal use of John, Duke of Berry (d. 1416), French prince and magnate, and was unusually large, allowing all the typical elements to be used in many months. It combines astrological and calendar information at the top, with a combination of the agricultural life of the peasant, the life of the courtiers, and illustrations of the Duke's many castles in the background of several scenes.

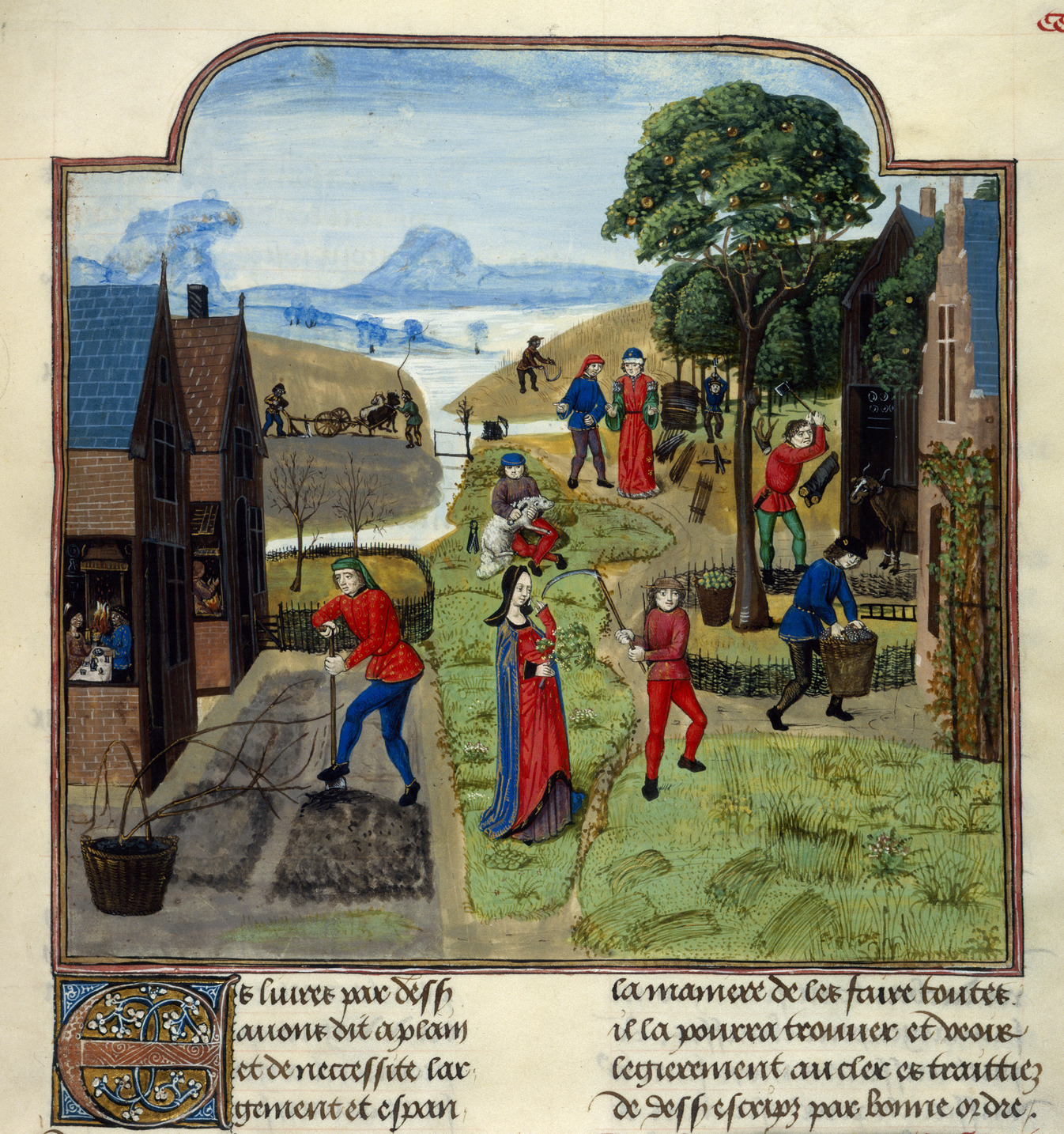
Untypically, this illustration to Pietro de' Crescenzi's farming manual shows all 12 labours, French, late 15th century.

A typical simple scheme was:

- January - Feasting
- February - Sitting by the fire
- March - Pruning trees, or digging
- April - Planting, enjoying the country, or picking flowers
- May - Hawking, boating, courtly love
- June - Hay harvest
- July - Wheat harvest
- August - Wheat threshing
- September - Grape harvest
- October - Ploughing or sowing
- November - Gathering acorns for pigs
- December - Killing pigs, baking

However, there could be many other variations than the above, especially in major wine-growing areas, where more wine related scenes were included. In manuscript cycles, hunting scenes may appear at most times of the year. Italian cycles often advance the agricultural scenes a month earlier than the ones from the Low Countries or England. A few cycles show (usually for April or May) scenes including medieval gardens. The impact of the onset of the Little Ice Age has been detected in differences between early and late examples.

== Sculpture cycles ==
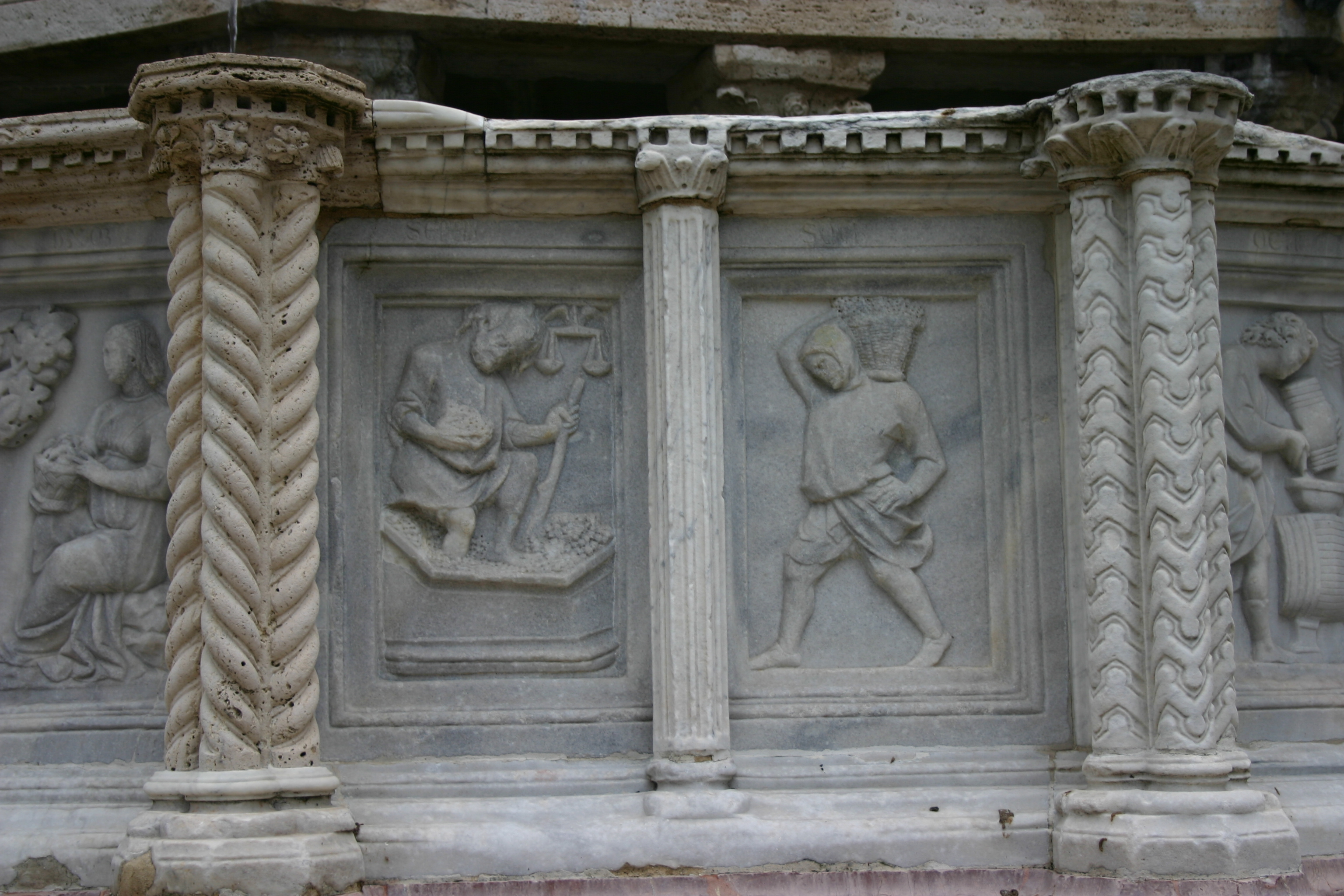
The Month of September from the Fontana Maggiore in Perugia (c. 1275), by Nicola and Giovanni Pisano, shows the treading of grapes.

Most sculptured cycles in Europe, especially when compressed into the archivolt of a portal, consist of an astrological symbol beside, above or incorporated in a sculpture or relief illustrating a monthly labour.

A few sculpted examples of the many surviving are:

- Chartres Cathedral: west and north portal archivolts
- Notre Dame, Paris: northern doorjambs of the west façade (Portal of the Virgin), and a stained glass Zodiacs, labours, vices and virtues cycle filling the west rose window
- Vezelay Abbey: Archivolt of main west basilica doorway
- Autun Cathedral: Archivolt of main west cathedral doorway
- Ferrara Cathedral
- Saint Mark's, Venice: main portal
- San Zeno di Verona: façade
- Lucca Cathedral: large bas-relief panels with little Zodial signs, to the right and left of the main facade door
- Fontana Maggiore, Perugia: relief panels showing monthly labours are amongst those surrounding the lower basin of the great fountain in front of the Duomo
- Otranto Cathedral: Zodiac signs and labours form part of the mosaic scenes which cover the entire floor
- Canterbury Cathedral: Zodiac signs and monthly labours are amongst the subjects illustrated in large inlaid marble floor medallions, on the edge of the Trinity Chapel close to where the shrine of Saint Thomas (Becket) was located
- St Augustine's Church, Brookland, Kent: large cylindrical lead font with reliefs of both Zodiac signs and monthly labours—a rare example in the UK both of such a font and of the combination of zodiac signs and monthly labours
- Carlisle Cathedral: the foliate capitals of the twelve piers of the choir each contain a figure representing one of the Labours of the months

== Stained glass ==
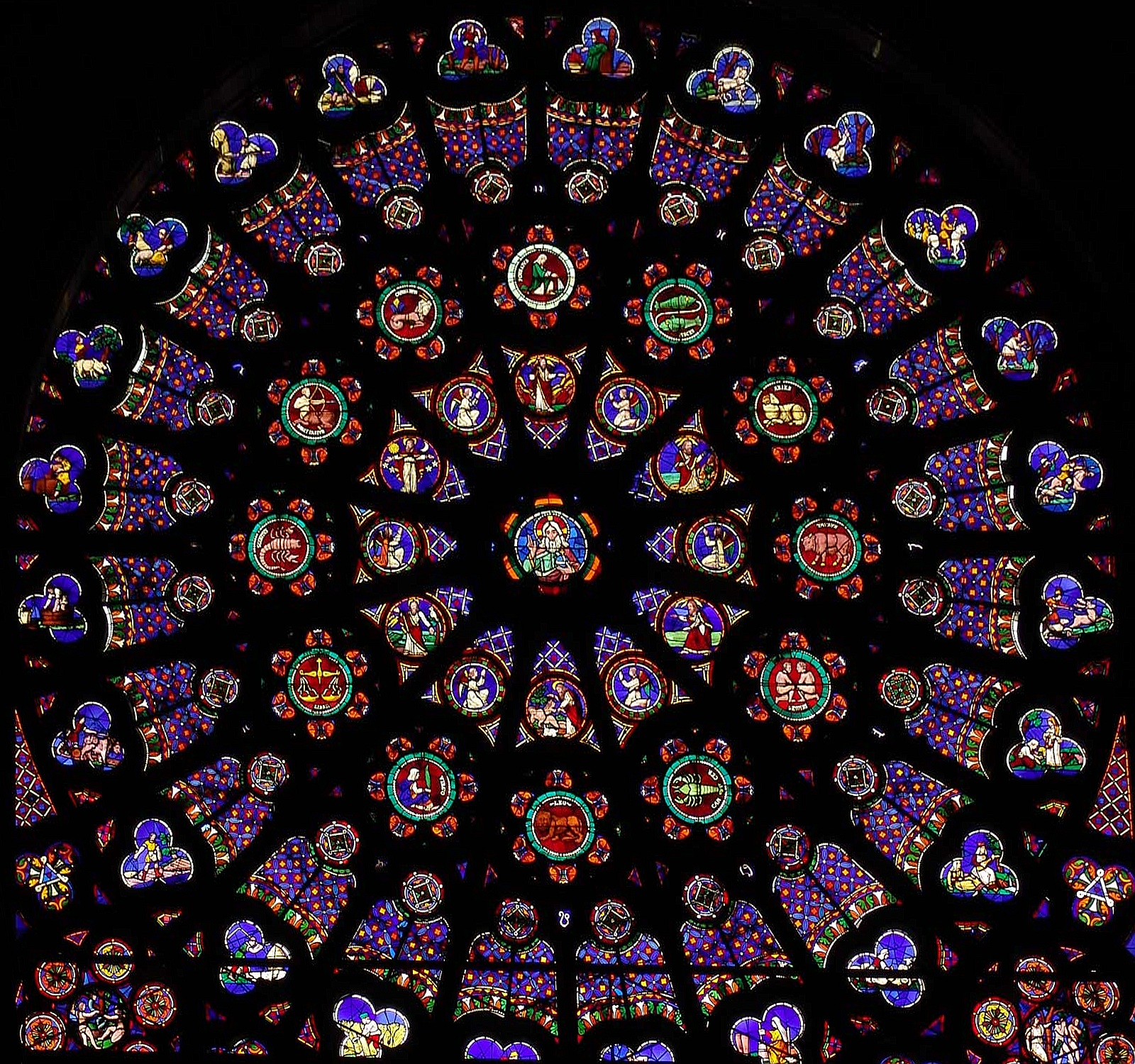
Rose window of Creation from the Basilica of Saint Denis. From outermost circle to the center: 24 images of the Labours of the Months, the 12 Zodiac signs, 12 images of angels and the Creation, and the Holy Father.

The Labours of the Months often occur in those rose windows that are dedicated to the Creation, the circular nature of the window suiting the cyclic theme. In these windows, the months are part of a complex iconographical scheme. Other windows have the Labours of the Months specifically as their subject matter.

- Basilica of Saint Denis : rose window of Creation in the north transept
- Chartres Cathedral : "Labours of the Months" window in south ambulatory

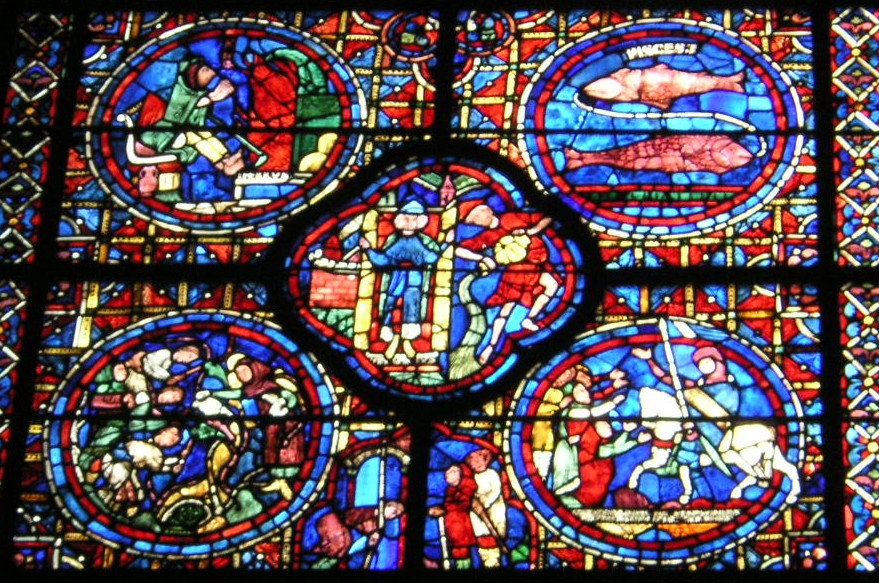
Chartres Cathedral, the months of December, January and February
