= Piazza IV Novembre =

Square in Perugia, Italy

Coordinates: 43.1121°N 12.3888°E

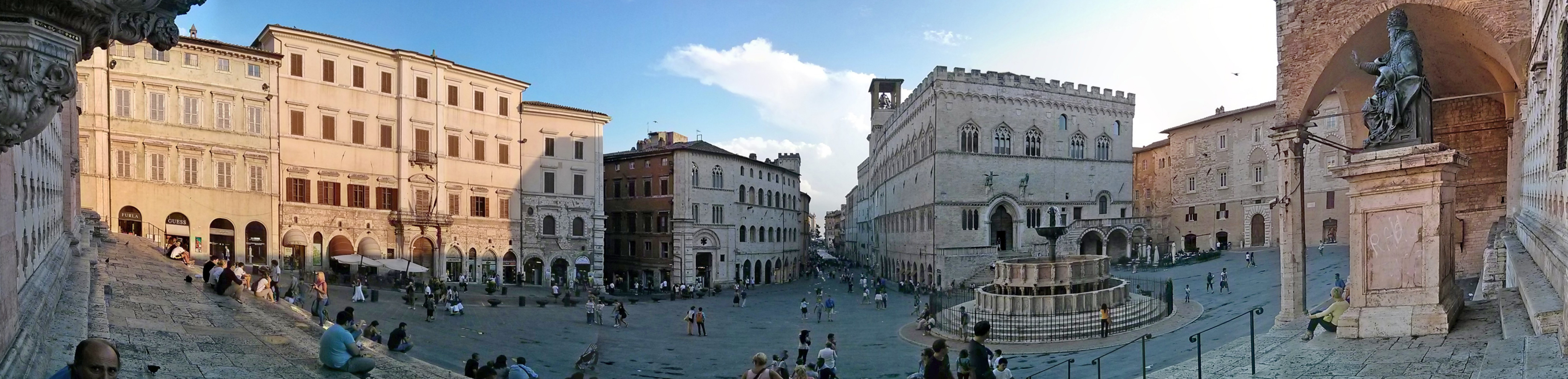
The square seen from the cathedral (panoramic view), with the perspective on Corso Vannucci.

Piazza IV Novembre is a square in the historic center of Perugia in Umbria, Italy.

The asymmetrical square opens up to the convergence of the five road axes that structure the medieval city and for its scenography it has represented in every era the privileged place of urban functions: here the ancient forum was located and there are preserved monuments connected to the system urban planning of the Etruscan-Roman city.

The Fontana Maggiore is placed at the centre of the square, and was built between 1275 and 1277. The square is surrounded by the Palazzo dei Priori, built between 1293 and 1297, and the Perugia Cathedral, built between 1345 and 1490.

== In popular culture ==
Netflix series Can This Love Be Translated? which follows the romance between interpreter Joo Ho-jin and actress Cha Mu-hee, was filmed in the plaza in early December 2024.
