= List of members of the Regional Council of Tuscany, 2025–present =

The XII Legislature of the Regional Council of Tuscany, the legislative assembly of Tuscany, was inaugurated on 10 November 2025, following the 2025 regional election.

Stefania Saccardi (Italia Viva) served as president of the council, while Eugenio Giani (Democratic Party) served as president of Tuscany at the head of his second government.

== Composition ==
Party	Seats	Government
Democratic Party (PD)	16 / 41	In government
Brothers of Italy (FdI)	13 / 41	In opposition
Italia Viva (IV)	4 / 41	In government
Greens and Left Alliance (AVS)	3 / 41	In government
Five Star Movement (M5S)	2 / 41	In government
Forza Italia (FI)	2 / 41	In opposition
Lega	1 / 41	In opposition

By coalition:

Coalition	Seats	Status
Centre-left coalition	25 / 41	Government
Centre-right coalition	16 / 41	Opposition

== Members ==
=== Elected members ===
Party / List	Councilor elected	Preference votes	Constituency
Democratic Party	Eugenio Giani	President-elect	
Democratic Party	Iacopo Melio	Regional candidate	
Democratic Party	Simona Querci	Regional candidate	
Democratic Party	Filippo Boni	10,924	Arezzo
Democratic Party	Leonardo Marras	13,419	Grosseto
Democratic Party	Alessandro Franchi	6,605	Livorno
Democratic Party	Mario Puppa	9,159	Lucca
Democratic Party	Gianni Lorenzetti	10,862	Massa-Carrara
Democratic Party	Antonio Mazzeo	13,274	Pisa
Democratic Party	Alessandra Nardini	14,528	Pisa
Democratic Party	Bernard Dika	14,282	Pistoia
Democratic Party	Simone Bezzini	12,656	Siena
Democratic Party	Matteo Biffoni	22,155	Prato
Democratic Party	Andrea Vannucci	6,104	Florence 1
Democratic Party	Serena Spinelli	8,180	Florence 2
Democratic Party	Brenda Barnini	13,683	Florence 3
Giani for President–Reformist House	Vittorio Salotti	2,964	Lucca
Giani for President–Reformist House	Federico Eligi	1,798	Pisa
Giani for President–Reformist House	Stefania Saccardi	5,469	Florence 1
Giani for President–Reformist House	Francesco Casini	3,819	Florence 2
Greens and Left Alliance	Diletta Fallani	1,676	Livorno
Greens and Left Alliance	Massimiliano Ghimenti	4,543	Pisa
Greens and Left Alliance	Lorenzo Falchi	5,282	Florence 1
Five Star Movement	Irene Galletti	2,318	Pisa
Five Star Movement	Luca Rossi Romanelli	803	Florence 1
Brothers of Italy	Alessandro Tomasi	Elected as the second-place presidential candidate	
Brothers of Italy	Gabriele Veneri	5,740	Arezzo
Brothers of Italy	Luca Minucci	6,537	Grosseto
Brothers of Italy	Marcella Amadio	5,387	Livorno
Brothers of Italy	Vittorio Fantozzi	8,420	Lucca
Brothers of Italy	Marco Guidi	4,688	Massa-Carrara
Brothers of Italy	Diego Petrucci	8,300	Pisa
Brothers of Italy	Alessandro Capecchi	9,303	Pistoia
Brothers of Italy	Enrico Tucci	4,679	Siena
Brothers of Italy	Chiara La Porta	7,963	Prato
Brothers of Italy	Jacopo Cellai	5,015	Florence 1
Brothers of Italy	Matteo Zoppini	4,271	Florence 2
Brothers of Italy	Claudio Gemelli	3,343	Florence 4
Forza Italia–UdC	Jacopo Maria Ferri	8,940	Massa Carrara
Forza Italia–UdC	Marco Stella	2,131	Florence 1
Lega Toscana	Massimiliano Simoni	Regional candidate	

=== Changes in the historical composition ===
- On 25 November 2025, Lidia Bai replaced Leonardo Marras, appointed regional assessor.
- On 25 November 2025, Roberta Casini replaced Filippo Boni, appointed regional assessor.
- On 25 November 2025, Matteo Trapani replaced Alessandra Nardini, appointed regional assessor.
- On 23 June 2026, Marta Logli replaced Matteo Biffoni, elected mayor of Prato.
- On 23 June 2026, Serena Bulleri replaced Marco Guidi, whose election was invalidated following a recount of the votes.

== Election ==
=== 2025 ===
12–13 October 2025 Tuscan regional election results
Candidates	Votes	%	Seats	Parties	Votes	%	Seats
Eugenio Giani	752,487	53.92	1	Democratic Party	437,313	34.43	15
Eugenio Giani	752,487	53.92	1	Giani for President – Reformist House	112,564	8.86	4
Eugenio Giani	752,487	53.92	1	Greens and Left Alliance	89,057	7.01	3
Eugenio Giani	752,487	53.92	1	Five Star Movement	55,158	4.34	2
Eugenio Giani	752,487	53.92	1	Total	694,092	54.64	24
Alessandro Tomasi	570,739	40.90	1	Brothers of Italy	340,202	26.78	12
Alessandro Tomasi	570,739	40.90	1	Forza Italia – UDC	78,404	6.17	2
Alessandro Tomasi	570,739	40.90	1	Lega Toscana	55,684	4.38	1
Alessandro Tomasi	570,739	40.90	1	It's Time – Tomasi for President	30,122	2.37	0
Alessandro Tomasi	570,739	40.90	1	Us Moderates	14,564	1.15	0
Alessandro Tomasi	570,739	40.90	1	Total	518,976	40.85	15
Antonella Bundu	72,321	5.18	0	Red Tuscany	57,250	4.51	0
Blank and invalid votes	39,782	2.77					
Total candidates	1,395,547	100.00	2	Total parties	1,270,318	100.0	39
Registered voters/turnout	1,435,329	47.73					
Source: Tuscan Region – Results

== Executive branch ==
The Regional Government (Giunta Regionale) of XII legislature was sworn in on 11 November 2025.

Party		Members
Democratic Party	PD	President; 5 assessors 1 undersecretary
Five Star Movement	M5S	1 assessor
Greens and Left Alliance	AVS	1 assessor
Giani for President–Reformist House	GP	1 assessor

Member	Party	Delegate for
Eugenio Giani (president)	PD	–
Mia Diop (vice president)	PD	International cooperation, peace, culture of legality, participation
David Barontini	M5S	Environment, circular economy, land reclamation
Filippo Boni	PD	Infrastructure, public transport, urban planning
Alberto Lenzi	AVS	Labour, technological innovation, administrative simplification
Cristina Manetti	GP	Culture, universities, gender equality
Leonardo Marras	PD	Economy, tourism, agriculture
Monia Monni	PD	Healthcare
Alessandra Nardini	PD	Public education, right to housing, reception and immigration
Bernard Dika (undersecretary)	PD	–

== See also ==
- List of members of the Regional Council of Tuscany, 2020–2025
