= List of members of the Regional Council of Tuscany, 2020–2025 =

The XI Legislature of the Regional Council of Tuscany, the legislative assembly of Tuscany, was inaugurated on 8 October 2020, following the 2020 regional election.

Antonio Mazzeo (Democratic Party) served as president of the council, while Eugenio Giani (Democratic Party) served as president of Tuscany at the head of his first government.

== Composition ==
| Party | Seats | Government |
|---|---|---|
| Democratic Party (PD) | 23 / 41 | In government |
| League | 9 / 41 | In opposition |
| Brothers of Italy (FdI) | 4 / 41 | In opposition |
| Italia Viva (IV) | 2 / 41 | In government |
| Five Star Movement (M5S) | 2 / 41 | In opposition |
| Forza Italia (FI) | 1 / 41 | In opposition |

== Members by party of election ==
=== Democratic Party ===
- Gianni Anselmi
- Cristiano Benucci
- Simone Bezzini (until 28 October 2020, appointed regional assessor)
  - Elena Rosignoli (since 28 October 2020)
- Ilaria Bugetti (until 25 June 2024, elected mayor of Prato)
  - Nicola Ciolini (from 25 June to 9 July 2024, resigned)
  - Marco Martini (since 9 July 2024)
- Giacomo Bugliani
- Vincenzo Ceccarelli
- Lucia De Robertis
- Federica Fratoni
- Francesco Gazzetti
- Cristina Giachi
- Eugenio Giani (president of Tuscany)
- Leonardo Marras (until 28 October 2020, appointed regional assessor)
  - Donatella Spadi (since 28 October 2020)
- Antonio Mazzeo (president of the regional council)
- Iacopo Melio
- Valentina Mercanti
- Monia Monni (until 28 October 2020, appointed regional assessor)
  - Fausto Merlotti (since 28 October 2020)
- Alessandra Nardini (until 28 October 2020, appointed regional assessor)
  - Andrea Pieroni (since 28 October 2020)
- Marco Niccolai
- Anna Paris
- Massimiliano Pescini
- Mario Puppa
- Enrico Sostegni
- Andrea Vannucci

=== Brothers of Italy ===
- Alessandro Capecchi
- Vittorio Fantozzi
- Diego Petrucci
- Francesco Torselli (until 9 July 2024, elected to the European Parliament)
  - Sandra Bianchini (since 9 July 2024)
- Gabriele Veneri

=== Five Star Movement ===
- Irene Galletti
- Silvia Noferi

=== Forza Italia ===
- Marco Stella

=== Italia Viva-More Europe ===
- Stefania Saccardi (until 28 October 2020, appointed regional assessor)
  - Maurizio Sguanci (since 28 October 2020)
- Stefano Scaramelli

=== Lega per Salvini Premier ===
- Luciana Bartolini
- Marco Casucci
- Giovanni Galli
- Marco Landi
- Elena Meini
- Elisa Montemagni (until 18 October 2022, elected to the Chamber of Deputies)
  - Massimiliano Riccardo Baldini (since 18 October 2022)
- Elisa Tozzi
- Andrea Ulmi

== Election ==
=== 2020 ===
20–21 September 2020 Tuscan regional election results
| Candidates | Votes | % | Seats | Parties | Votes | % | Seats |
|---|---|---|---|---|---|---|---|
| Eugenio Giani | 864,310 | 48.62 | 1 | Democratic Party | 563,116 | 34.69 | 22 |
| Eugenio Giani | 864,310 | 48.62 | 1 | Italia Viva – More Europe | 72,649 | 4.48 | 2 |
| Eugenio Giani | 864,310 | 48.62 | 1 | Civic Ecologist Left | 48,410 | 2.98 | – |
| Eugenio Giani | 864,310 | 48.62 | 1 | Proud Tuscany for Giani | 47,778 | 2.94 | – |
| Eugenio Giani | 864,310 | 48.62 | 1 | Green Europe | 26,924 | 1.66 | – |
| Eugenio Giani | 864,310 | 48.62 | 1 | Svolta! | 5,246 | 0.32 | – |
| Eugenio Giani | 864,310 | 48.62 | 1 | Total | 764,123 | 47.08 | 24 |
| Susanna Ceccardi | 719,266 | 40.46 | 2 | League | 353,514 | 21.78 | 7 |
| Susanna Ceccardi | 719,266 | 40.46 | 2 | Brothers of Italy | 219,165 | 13.50 | 4 |
| Susanna Ceccardi | 719,266 | 40.46 | 2 | Forza Italia – UDC | 69,456 | 4.28 | 1 |
| Susanna Ceccardi | 719,266 | 40.46 | 2 | Civic Tuscany for Change | 16,923 | 1.04 | – |
| Susanna Ceccardi | 719,266 | 40.46 | 2 | Total | 659,058 | 40.60 | 12 |
| Irene Galletti | 113,796 | 6.40 | 1 | Five Star Movement | 113,836 | 7.01 | 1 |
| Tommaso Fattori | 39,684 | 2.23 | – | Tuscany to the Left | 46,514 | 2.87 | – |
| Salvatore Catello | 17,007 | 0.96 | – | Communist Party | 17,032 | 1.05 | – |
| Marco Barzanti | 16,078 | 0.90 | – | Italian Communist Party | 15,617 | 0.96 | – |
| Tiziana Vigni | 7,668 | 0.43 | – | 3V Movement | 6,974 | 0.43 | – |
| Total candidates | 1,777,809 | 100.00 | 4 | Total parties | 1,623,154 | 100.00 | 37 |
Source: Tuscany Region – Electoral Services

== Executive branch ==
The Regional Government (Giunta Regionale) of XI legislature was sworn in on 22 October 2020.

| Party | | Members |
|---|---|---|
| Democratic Party | PD | President and 6 assessors |
| Italia Viva | IV | 1 assessor |
| Civic Ecologic Left | SCE | 1 assessor |

| Member | Party | Delegate for |
|---|---|---|
| Eugenio Giani (president) | PD | – |
| Stefania Saccardi (vice president) | IV | Agriculture, food processing, hunt and fishing |
| Stefano Baccelli | PD | Transports, infrastructures and sustainable mobility |
| Simone Bezzini | PD | Healthcare |
| Monia Monni | PD | Environment, circular economy, soil protection |
| Serena Spinelli | SCE | Social policies and public houses |
| Leonardo Marras | PD | Economy and tourism |
| Alessandra Nardini | PD | Public education, university and scientific research |
| Stefano Ciuoffo | PD | Bureaucratic simplification and informatisation |

== See also ==
- List of members of the Regional Council of Tuscany, 2015–2020
- List of members of the Regional Council of Tuscany, 2025–present
