= Politics of Tuscany =

Politics of Italian region

The politics of Tuscany, a region of Italy, takes place in the framework of an "anomalous presidential" representative democracy or prime-ministerial system with an executive presidency, whereby the President of the Region is the head of government, and of a pluriform multi-party system. Legislative power is vested in the Regional Council of Tuscany, while executive power is exercised by the Regional Government led by the President, who is directly elected by the people. The current Statute, which regulates the functioning of the regional institutions, has been in force since 2005.

Prior to the rise of Fascism, most of the deputies elected in Tuscany were part of the liberal establishment (see Historical Right, Historical Left and Liberals), which governed Italy for decades. Florence and the southern provinces of the region were anyway an early stronghold of the Italian Socialist Party (PSI). At the 1924 general election, which opened the way to the Fascist authoritarian rule, Tuscany was one of the regions where the National Fascist Party (PNF) obtained more than 70% of the vote.

After World War II, Tuscany became a stronghold of the Italian Communist Party (PCI), which was especially strong in rural areas. The PCI and its successors have governed the region since 1970. The region is now a stronghold of the "centre-left coalition" led by the Democratic Party (PD), like the other regions of the so-called "Red belt".

The centre-left coalition has governed the region since 1995, under President Eugenio Giani since 2020.

== Executive branch ==
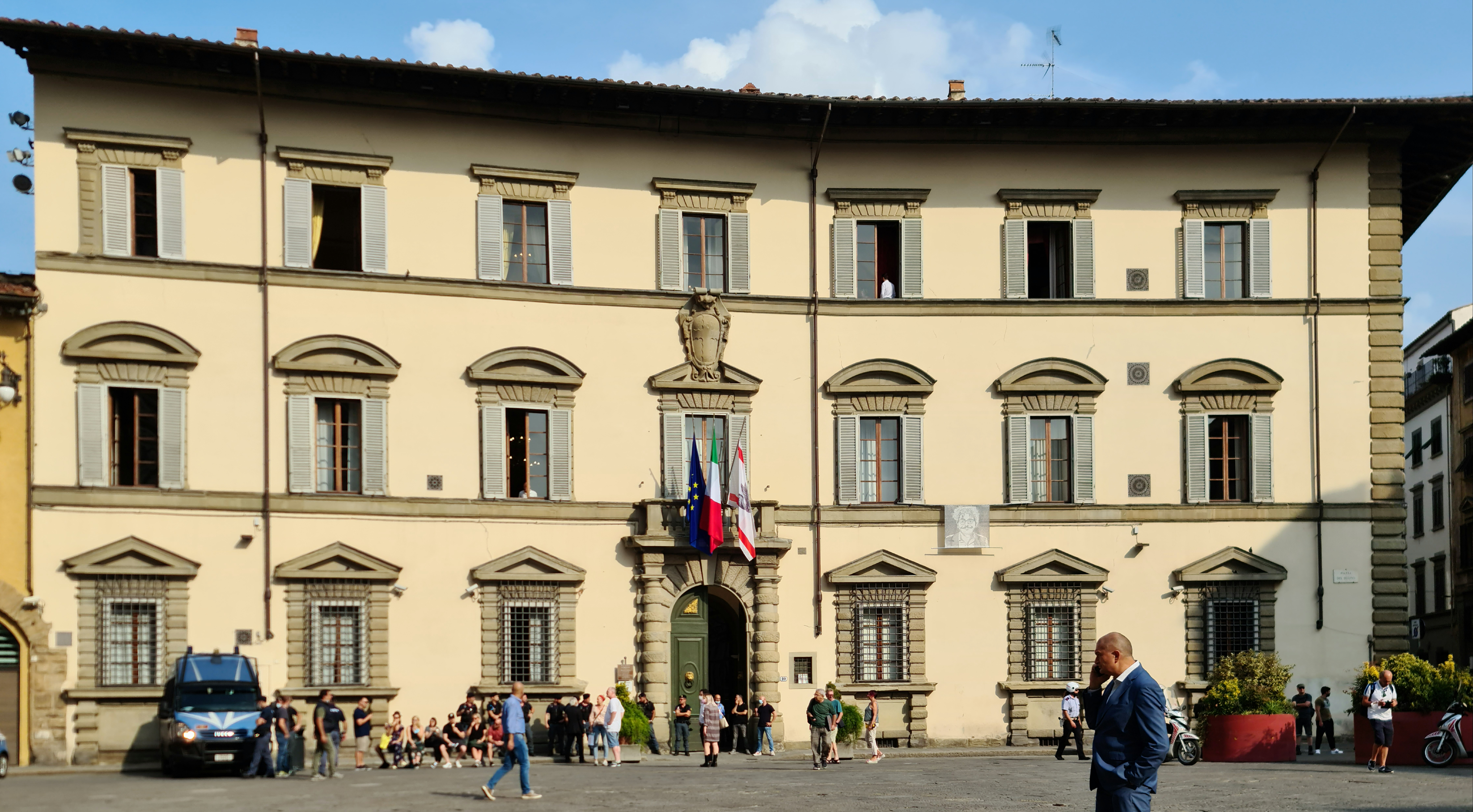
Palazzo Strozzi-Sacrati in Florence is the seat of the Regional Government

The Regional Government (Giunta Regionale) is presided by the President of the Region (Presidente della Regione), who is elected for a five-year term, and is currently composed by nine members: the President and 8 regional ministers or assessors (Assessori), including a Vice President (Vice Presidente).

=== Current composition ===
The current Regional Government was sworn in on 10 November 2025.

Party		Members
Democratic Party	PD	President and 5 ministers
Italia Viva	IV	1 minister
Greens and Left Alliance	AVS	1 minister
Five Star Movement	M5S	1 minister

Minister	Party	Delegate for
Mia Diop	PD	Vice President, international cooperation and participation
Filippo Boni	PD	Infrastructures, public transport, urban planning and urban regeneration
Alessandra Nardini	PD	Education, immigration and public housing
Monia Monni	PD	Healthcare and public services
Leonardo Marras	PD	Economy and budget, tourism, agriculture
Cristina Manetti	IV	Culture, university and research, gender equality
Alberto Lenzi	AVS	Employment policies, technological innovation, cybersecurity
David Barontini	M5S	Ecology and environment
Bernard Dika	PD	Under-Secretary to the President

=== List of presidents ===
President		Term of office		Party	Administration	Administration coalition	Legislature
President		Duration in years, months and days		Party	Administration	Administration coalition	Legislature
1	Lelio Lagorio (1925–2017)	28 July 1970	26 September 1978	PSI	Lagorio I	PCI • PSI • PSIUP	I (1970)
1	Lelio Lagorio (1925–2017)	28 July 1970	26 September 1978	PSI	Lagorio II	PCI • PSI	II (1975)
1	Lelio Lagorio (1925–2017)	8 years, 1 month and 30 days		PSI	Lagorio II	PCI • PSI	II (1975)
2	Mario Leone (1922–2013)	26 September 1978	31 May 1983	PSI	Leone I	PCI • PSI	II (1975)
2	Mario Leone (1922–2013)	26 September 1978	31 May 1983	PSI	Leone II	PCI • PSI	III (1980)
2	Mario Leone (1922–2013)	4 years, 8 months and 6 days		PSI	Leone II	PCI • PSI	III (1980)
3	Gianfranco Bartolini (1927–1992)	31 May 1983	10 July 1990	PCI	Bartolini I	PCI • PDUP	III (1980)
3	Gianfranco Bartolini (1927–1992)	31 May 1983	10 July 1990	PCI	Bartolini II	PCI • PSI • PSDI	IV (1985)
3	Gianfranco Bartolini (1927–1992)	7 years, 1 month and 11 days		PCI	Bartolini II	PCI • PSI • PSDI	IV (1985)
4	Marco Marcucci (Born 1949)	10 July 1990	11 January 1992	PCI; PDS	Marcucci	PCI • PSI • PSDI	V (1990)
4	Marco Marcucci (Born 1949)	1 year, 6 months and 2 days		PCI; PDS	Marcucci	PCI • PSI • PSDI	V (1990)
5	Vannino Chiti (Born 1947)	11 January 1992	18 May 2000	PDS; DS	Chiti I	PDS • PSI • PSDI • PLI	V (1990)
5	Vannino Chiti (Born 1947)	11 January 1992	18 May 2000	PDS; DS	Chiti II	Democratic Tuscany (PDS • PPI • FdV • FL)	VI (1995)
5	Vannino Chiti (Born 1947)	8 years, 4 months and 8 days		PDS; DS	Chiti II	Democratic Tuscany (PDS • PPI • FdV • FL)	VI (1995)
6	Claudio Martini (Born 1951)	18 May 2000	16 April 2010	DS; PD	Martini I	Democratic Tuscany (DS • PPI • Dem • PdCI • FdV • SDI)	VII (2000)
6	Claudio Martini (Born 1951)	18 May 2000	16 April 2010	DS; PD	Martini II	Democratic Tuscany (DS • DL • PdCI • FdV)	VIII (2005)
6	Claudio Martini (Born 1951)	9 years, 10 months and 30 days		DS; PD	Martini II	Democratic Tuscany (DS • DL • PdCI • FdV)	VIII (2005)
7	Enrico Rossi (Born 1958)	16 April 2010	8 October 2020	PD	Rossi I	Democratic Tuscany (PD • IdV • FdS • FdV)	IX (2010)
7	Enrico Rossi (Born 1958)	16 April 2010	8 October 2020	PD	Rossi II	PD	X (2015)
7	Enrico Rossi (Born 1958)	10 years, 5 months and 23 days		PD	Rossi II	PD	X (2015)
8	Eugenio Giani (Born 1959)	8 October 2020	Incumbent	PD	Giani I	PD • IV	XI (2020)
8	Eugenio Giani (Born 1959)	8 October 2020	Incumbent	PD	Giani II	PD • IV • AVS • M5S	XII (2025)
8	Eugenio Giani (Born 1959)	5 years, 11 months and 14 days		PD	Giani II	PD • IV • AVS • M5S	XII (2025)

== Legislative branch ==
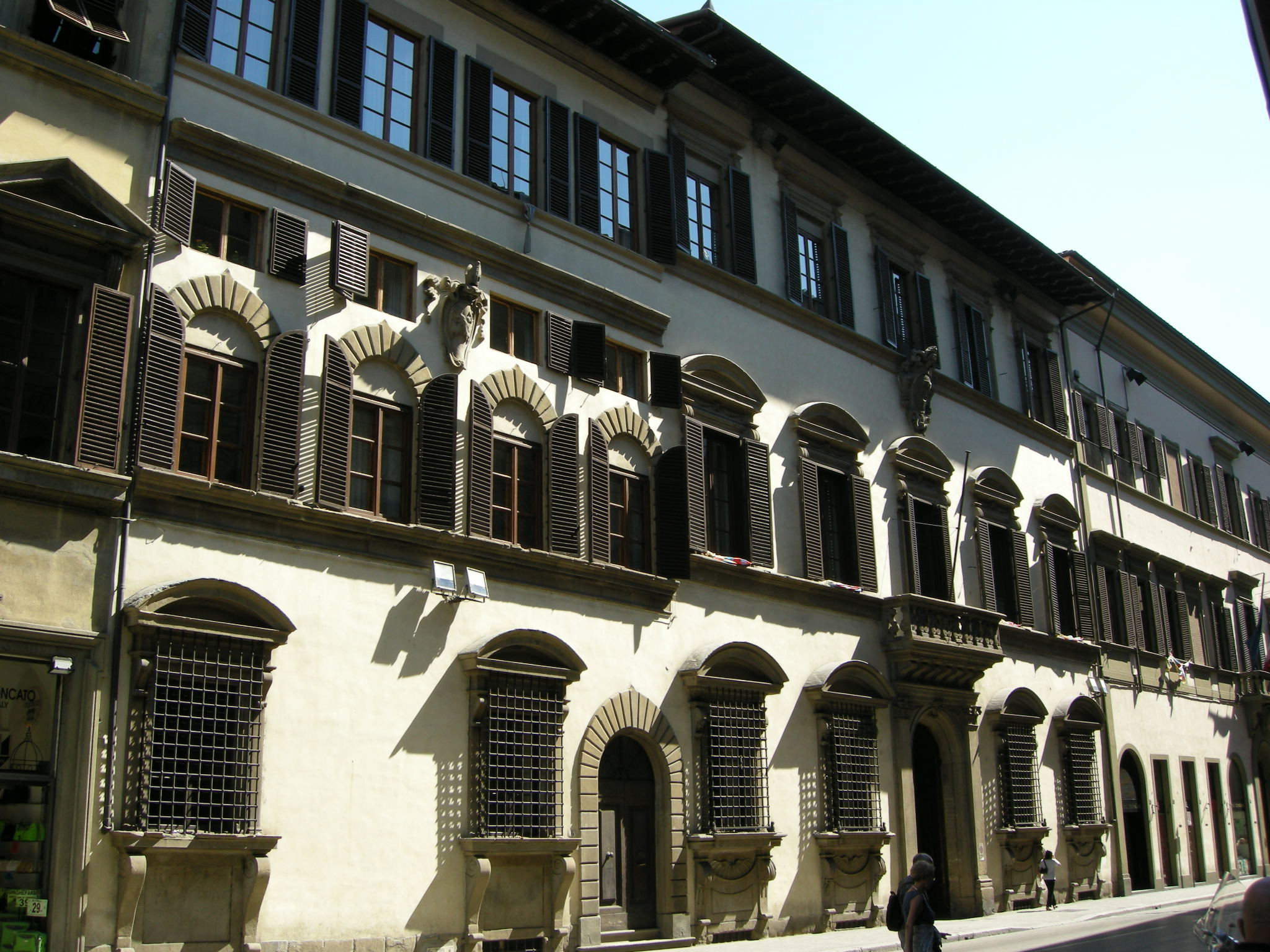

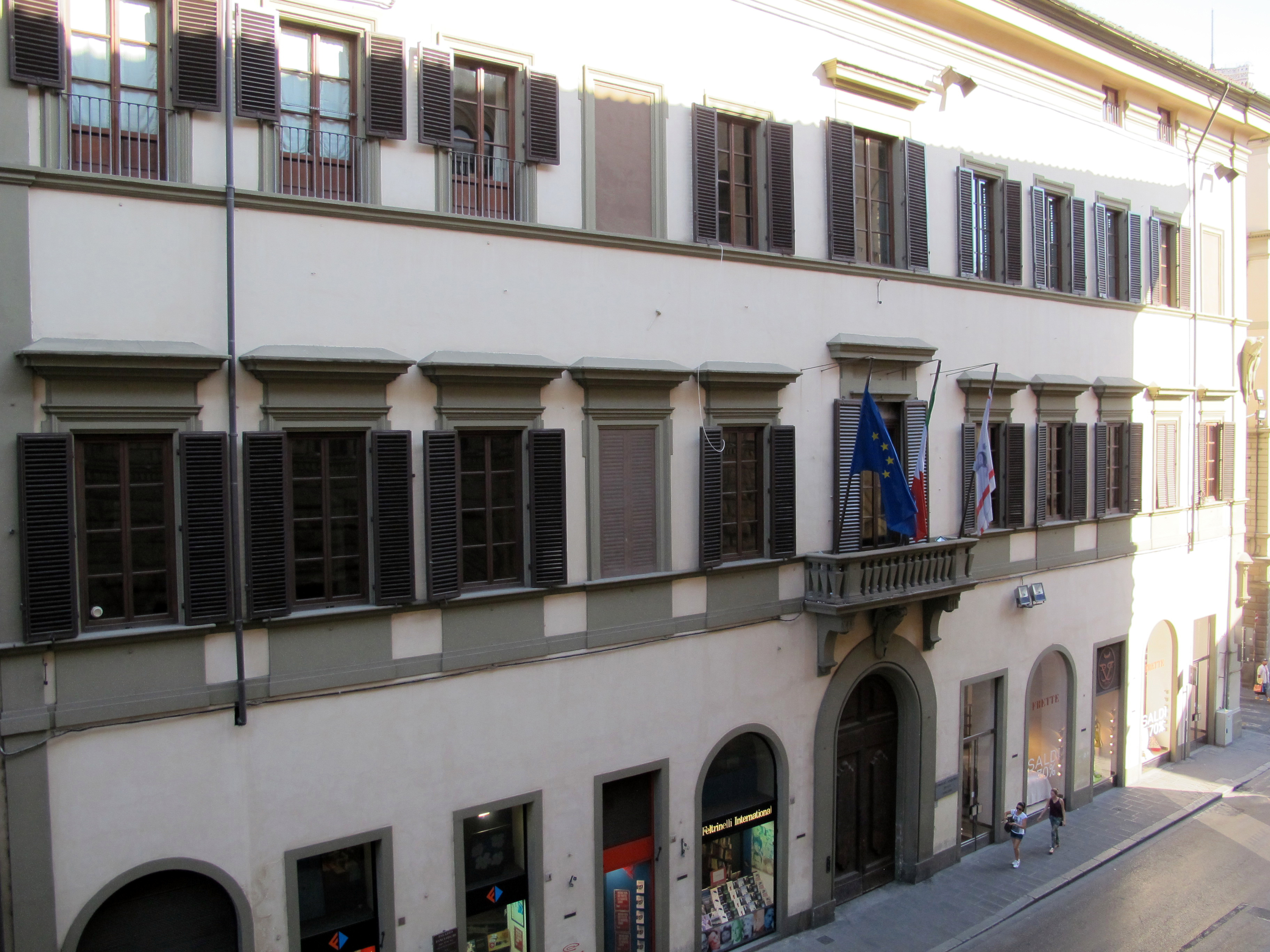
Palazzo Capponi-Covoni and Palazzo Panciatichi in Florence are the seats of the Regional Council

The Regional Council of Tuscany is composed of 41 members.

Councillors are elected in provincial constituencies by proportional representation using the D'Hondt method. The Florence constituency is further divided into 4 sub-constituencies. Preferential voting is allowed: a maximum of two preferences can be expressed for candidates of the same party list and provided the two chosen candidates are of different gender. In this system parties are grouped in alliances, supporting a candidate for the post of President of Tuscany. The candidate receiving at least 40% of the votes is elected to the post and his/her list (or the coalition) is awarded a majority bonus in the Regional Council. If no candidate gets more than 40% of the votes, a run-off is held fourteen days after, with only the two top candidates from the first round allowed. The winning candidate is assured a majority in the Regional Council.

The Council is elected for a five-year term, but, if the President suffers a vote of no confidence, resigns or dies, under the simul stabunt, simul cadent clause introduced in 1999 (literally they will stand together or they will fall together), also the Council is dissolved and a snap election is called.

=== Current composition ===
After the 2025 regional election, the Regional Council of Tuscany is currently composed of the following political groups:

Party	Seats	Status
Democratic Party (PD)	16 / 41	In government
Brothers of Italy (FdI)	13 / 41	In opposition
Italia Viva (IV)	4 / 41	In government
Greens and Left Alliance (AVS)	3 / 41	In government
Five Star Movement (M5S)	2 / 41	In government
Forza Italia (FI)	2 / 41	In opposition
National Future	1 / 41	In opposition

By coalition:

Coalition	Seats	Status
Centre-left coalition	25 / 41	Government
Centre-right coalition	16 / 41	Opposition

== Local government ==
=== Provinces ===
Maps of Provinces of Tuscany

Tuscany is divided in ten provinces, which are a traditional form of local administration in the region.

The four main functions devolved to the provinces are:

- local planning and zoning;
- maintenance of public high school buildings;
- provision of local police and fire services;
- transportation regulation (car registration, maintenance of local roads, etc.).

From 1945 to 1995 presidents of the provinces were chosen by the members of the Provincial Councils, legislative bodies elected every five years by citizens. From 1995 to 2014, under provisions of the 1993 local administration reform, presidents of the provinces of Tuscany were chosen by popular election, originally every four, then every five years.

On 3 April 2014, the Chamber of Deputies gave its final approval to the Law n.56/2014 which involved the transformation of the Italian provinces into "institutional bodies of second level". According to the 2014 reform, now each province is headed by a President (or Commissioner) assisted by a legislative body, the Provincial Council, and an executive body, the Provincial Executive. President (Commissioner) and members of Council are elected together by mayors and city councillors of each municipality of the province respectively every four and two years. The Executive is chaired by the President (Commissioner) who appoint others members, called assessori. Since 2015, the President (Commissioner) and other members of the Council do not receive a salary.

Socialist and communist ideas had an early diffusion in quite all the provinces around World War I. After the Fascist parenthesis, left-wing parties found their strongholds in eastern rural provinces, especially Siena and Arezzo, while Christian Democracy used to be strong in the north-western part of the Region.

The Province of Florence is now one of the major national strongholds of Democratic Party. The Province of Siena is also called the "red province of Italy", because the Italian Communist Party has always governed it with the 60% of the votes since 1945 to the dissolution of the party in 1991.

Province	Inhabitants	President	Party	Election
Metropolitan City of Florence	991,862	Sara Funaro (metropolitan mayor)	PD	2024
Pisa	414,154	Massimiliano Angori	PD	2018
Lucca	392,182	Marcello Pierucci	PD	2024
Arezzo	348,327	Alessandro Polcri	Ind. (Centre-right)	2022
Livorno	341,453	Sandra Scarpellini	PD	2022
Pistoia	292,108	Luca Marmo	PD	2019
Siena	270,333	Agnese Carletti	PD	2024
Prato	248,174	Simone Calamai	PD	2022
Grosseto	227,063	Francesco Limatola	PD	2021
Massa-Carrara	203,642	Roberto Valettini	Ind.	2025

Provincial seats

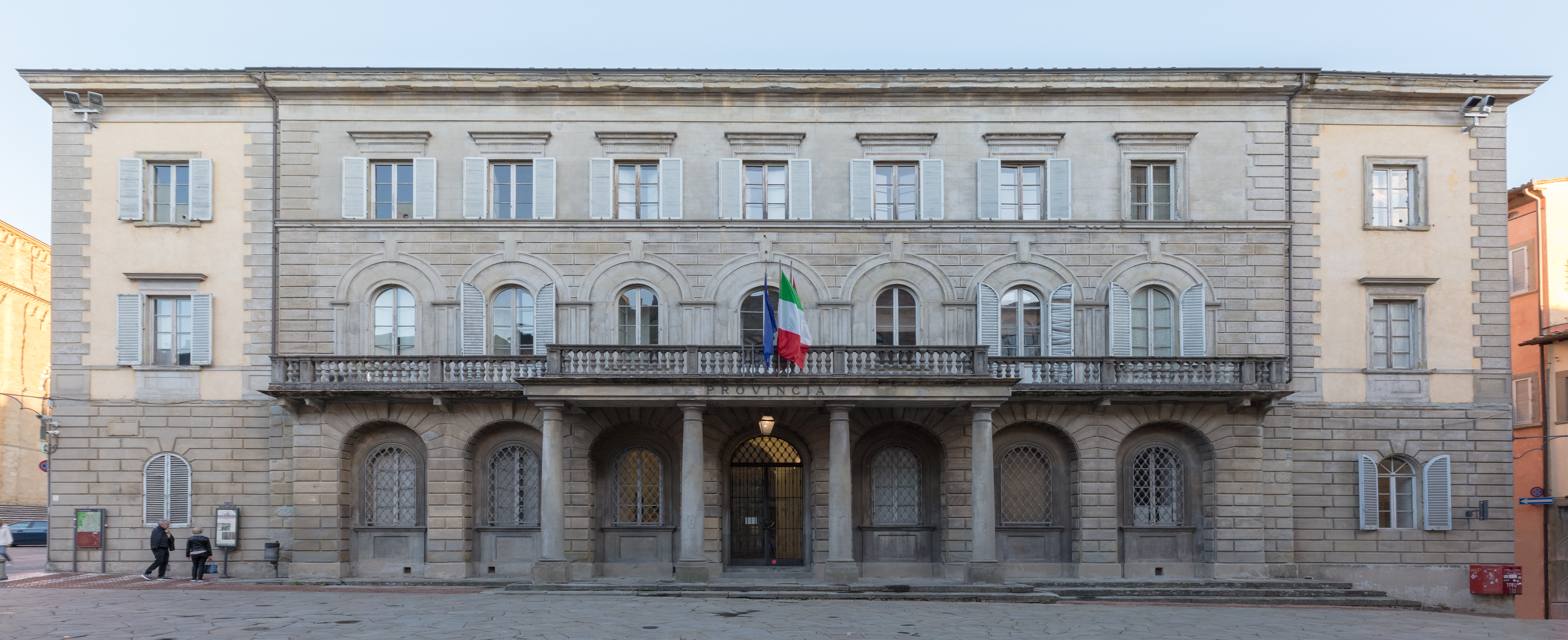
Arezzo

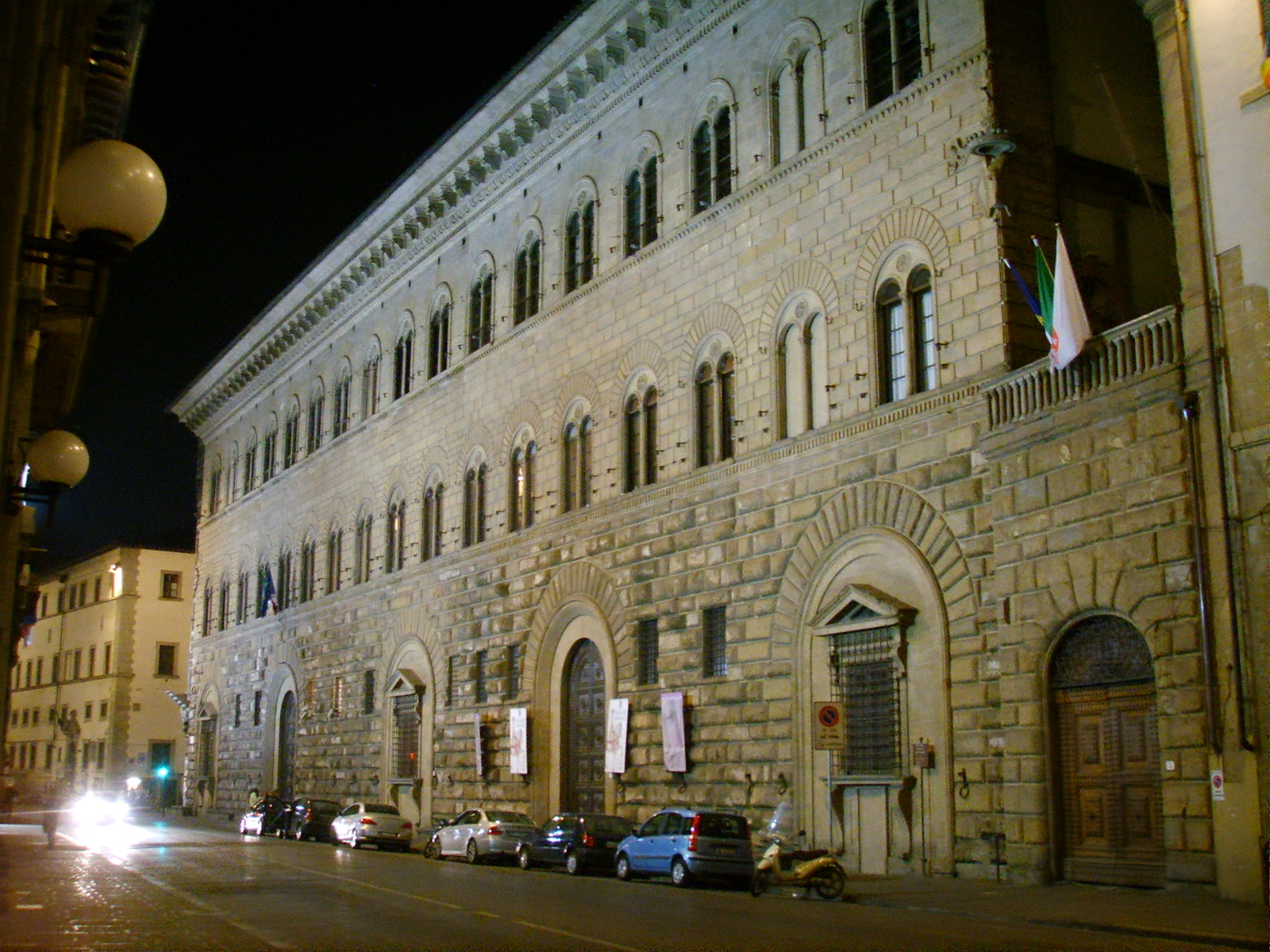
Florence

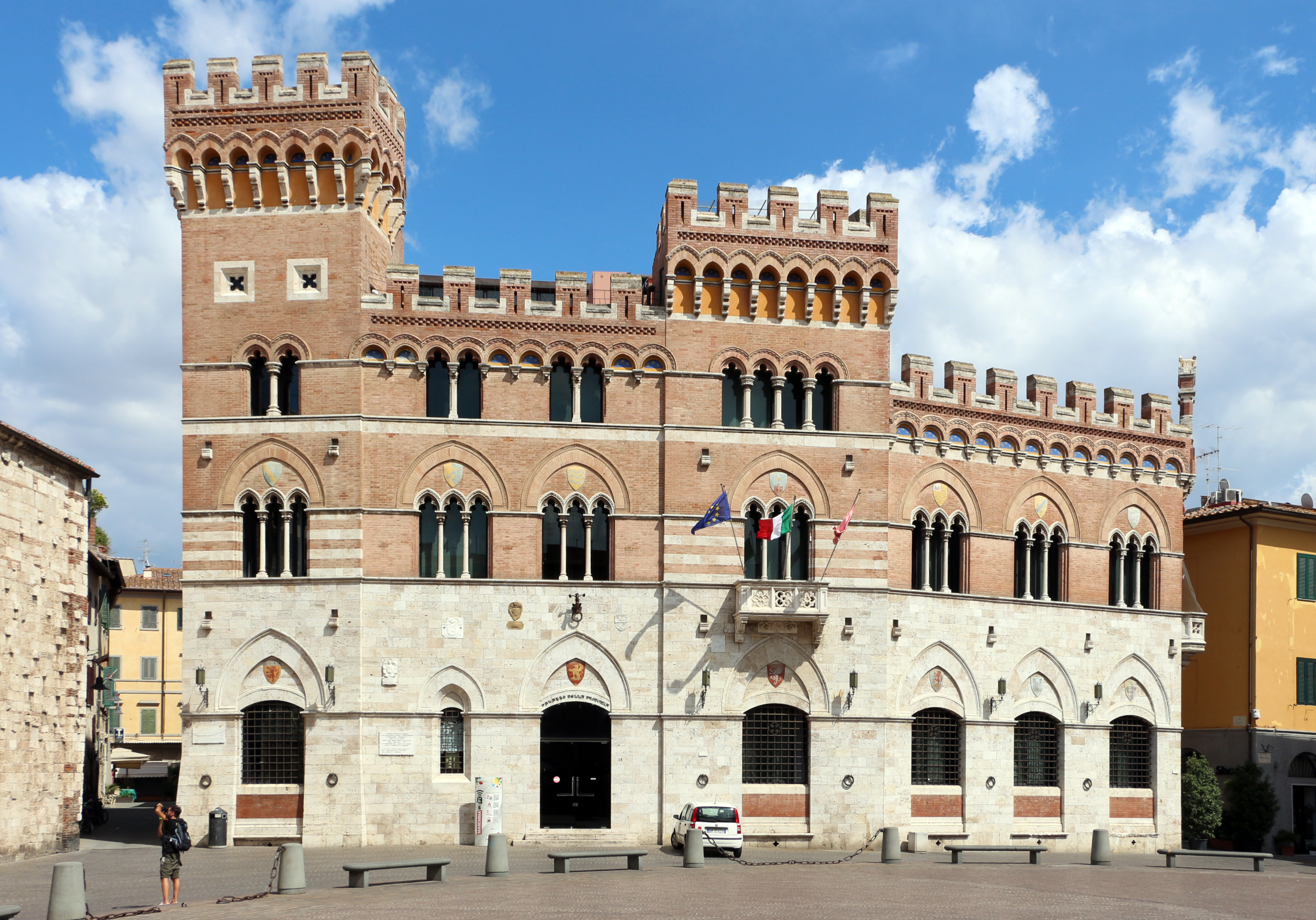
Grosseto

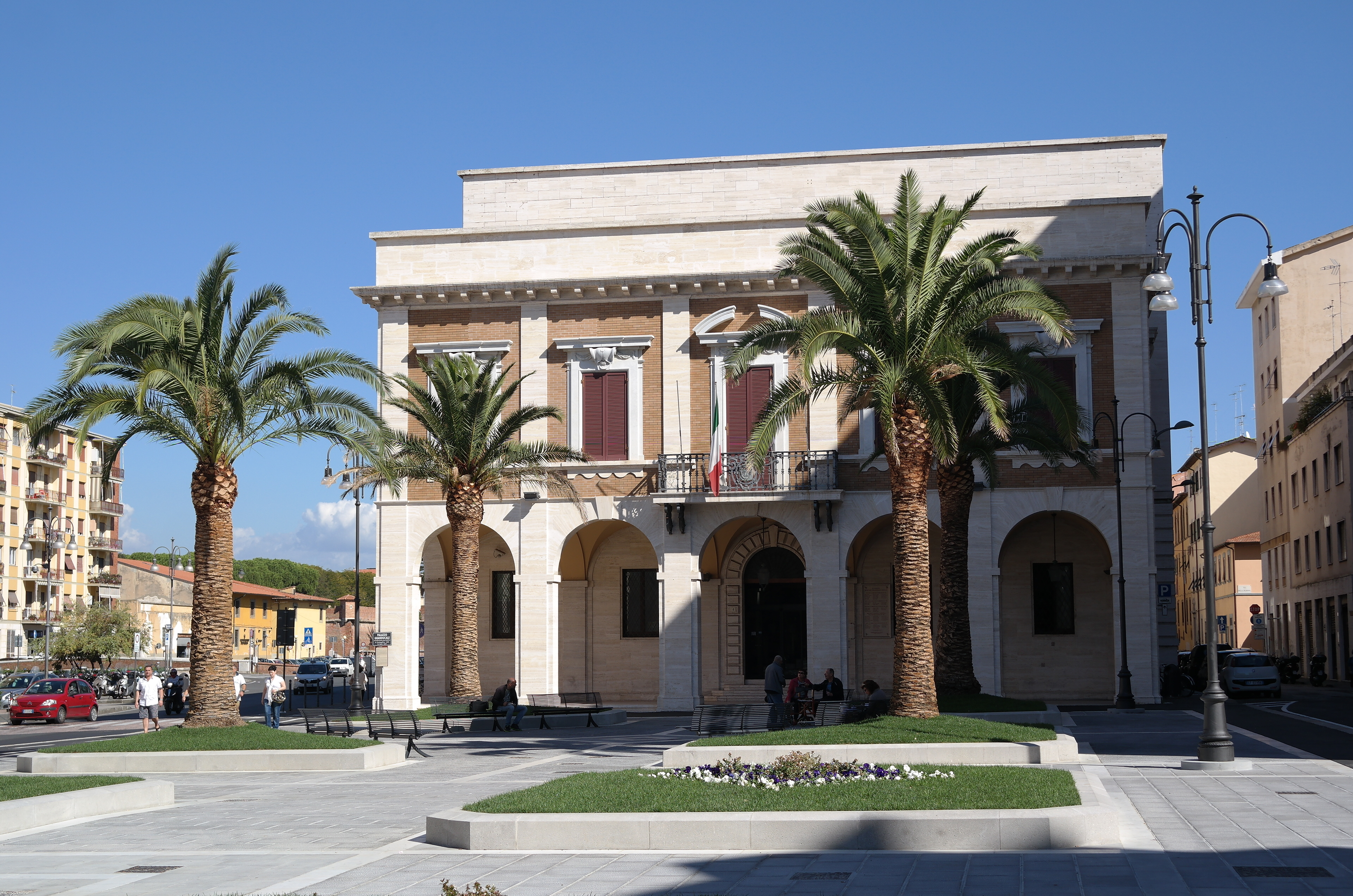
Livorno

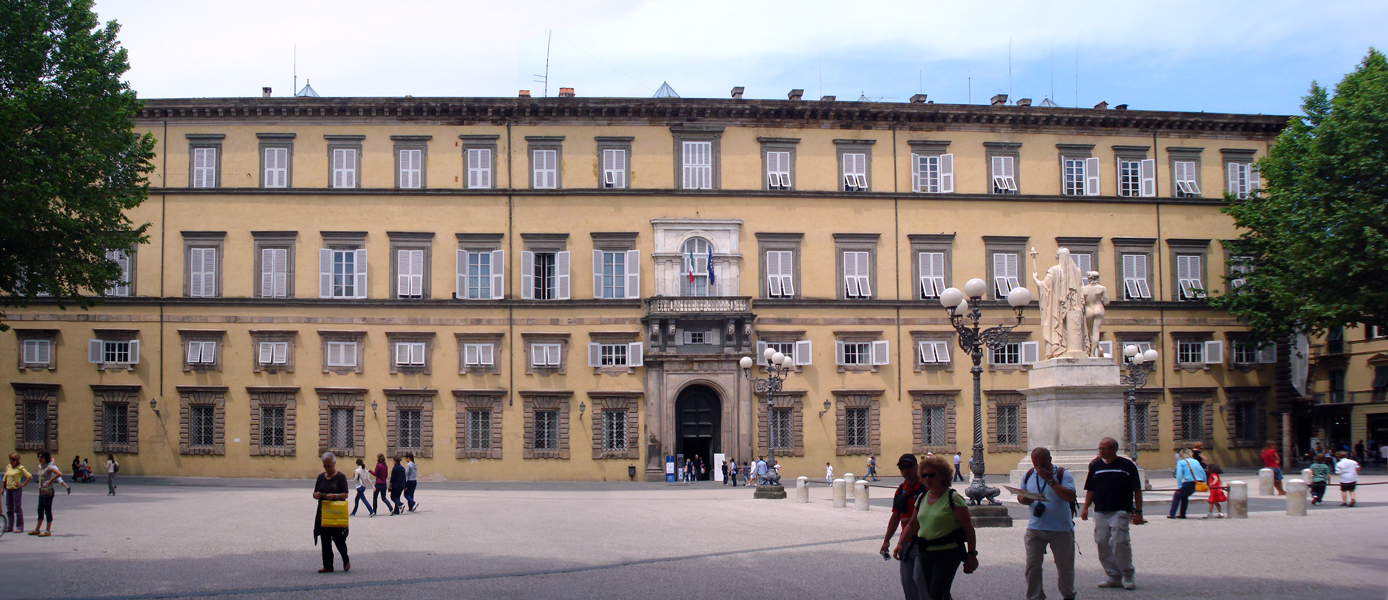
Lucca

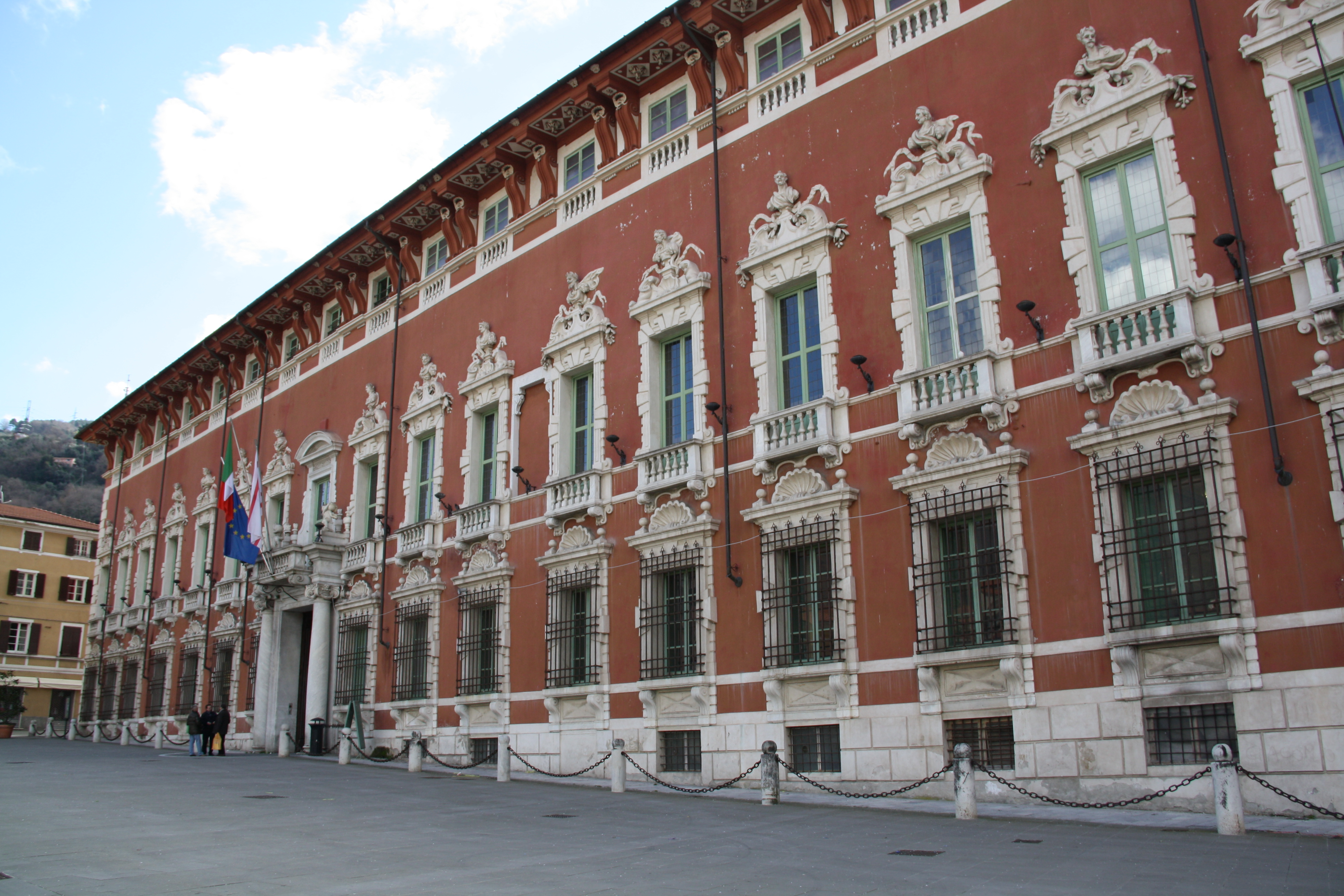
Province of Massa-Carrara

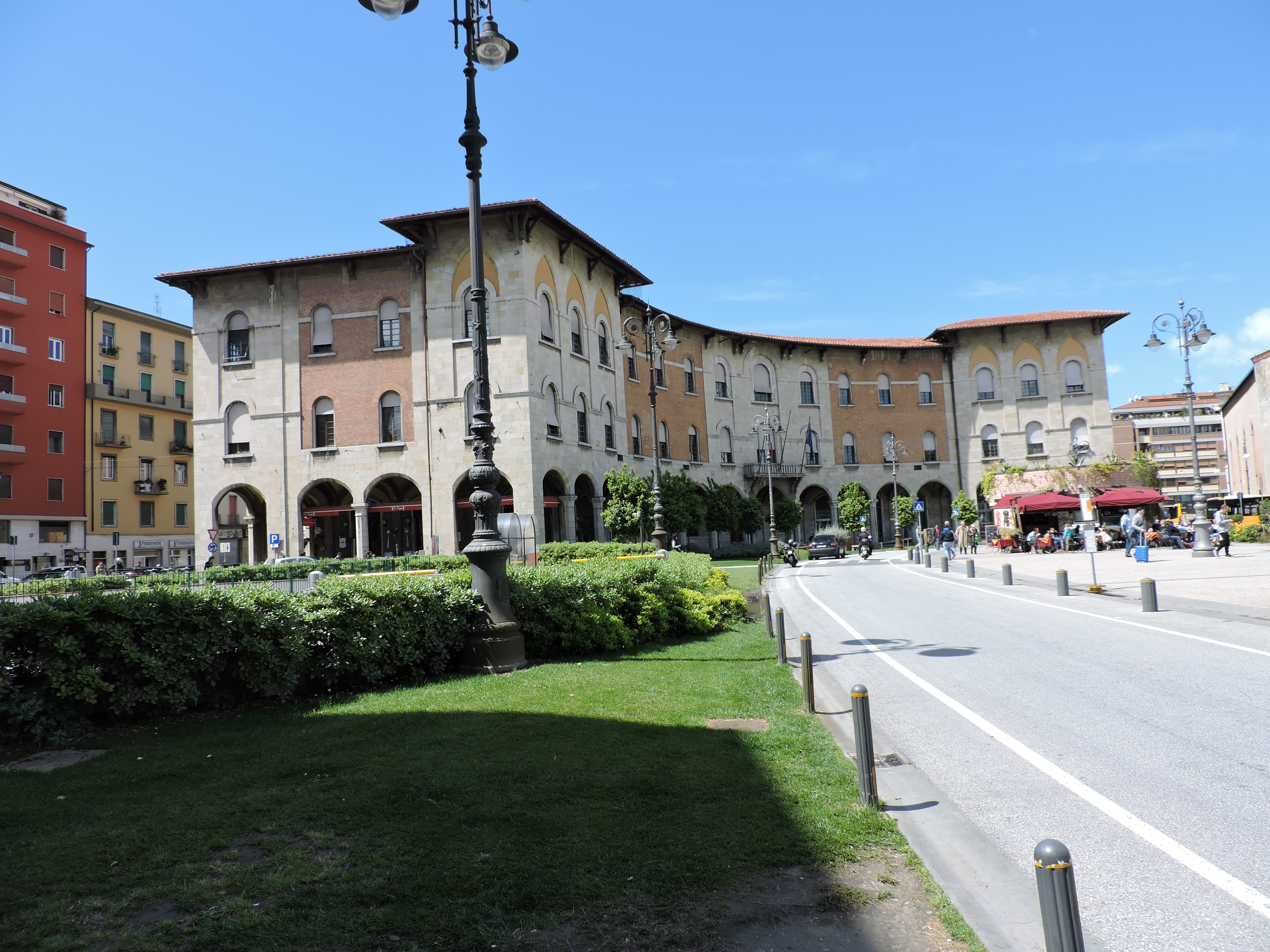
Pisa

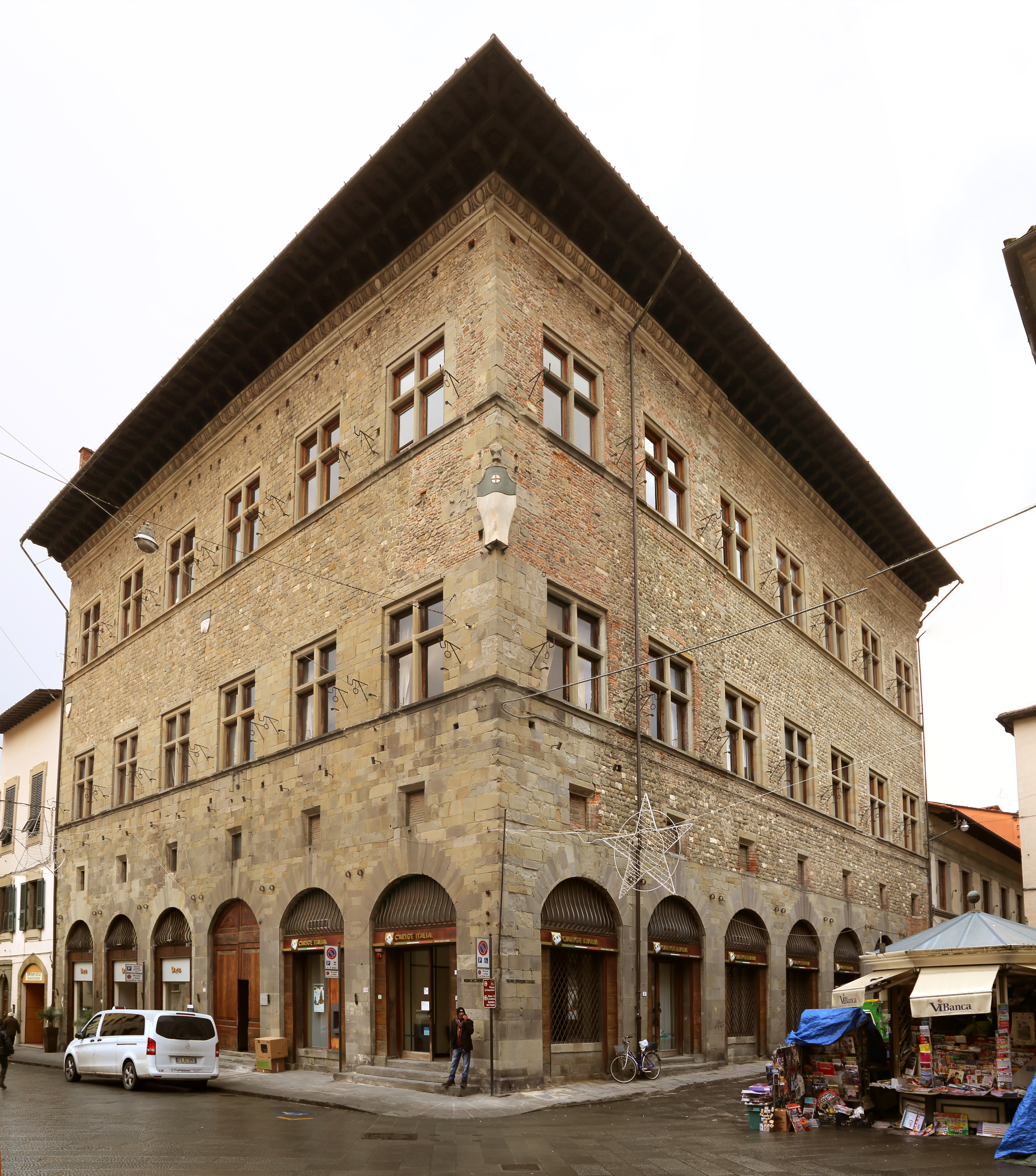
Pistoia

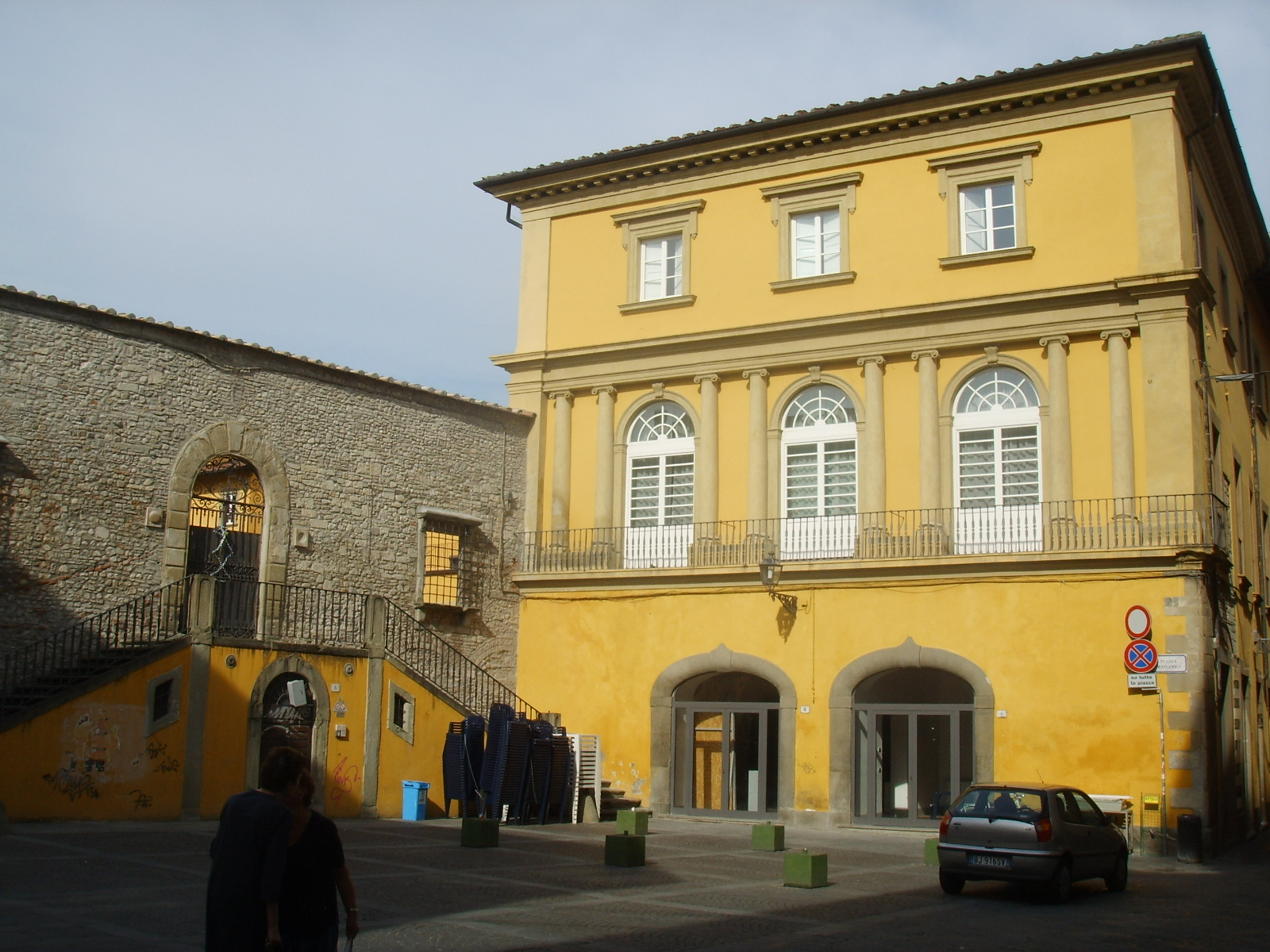
Prato

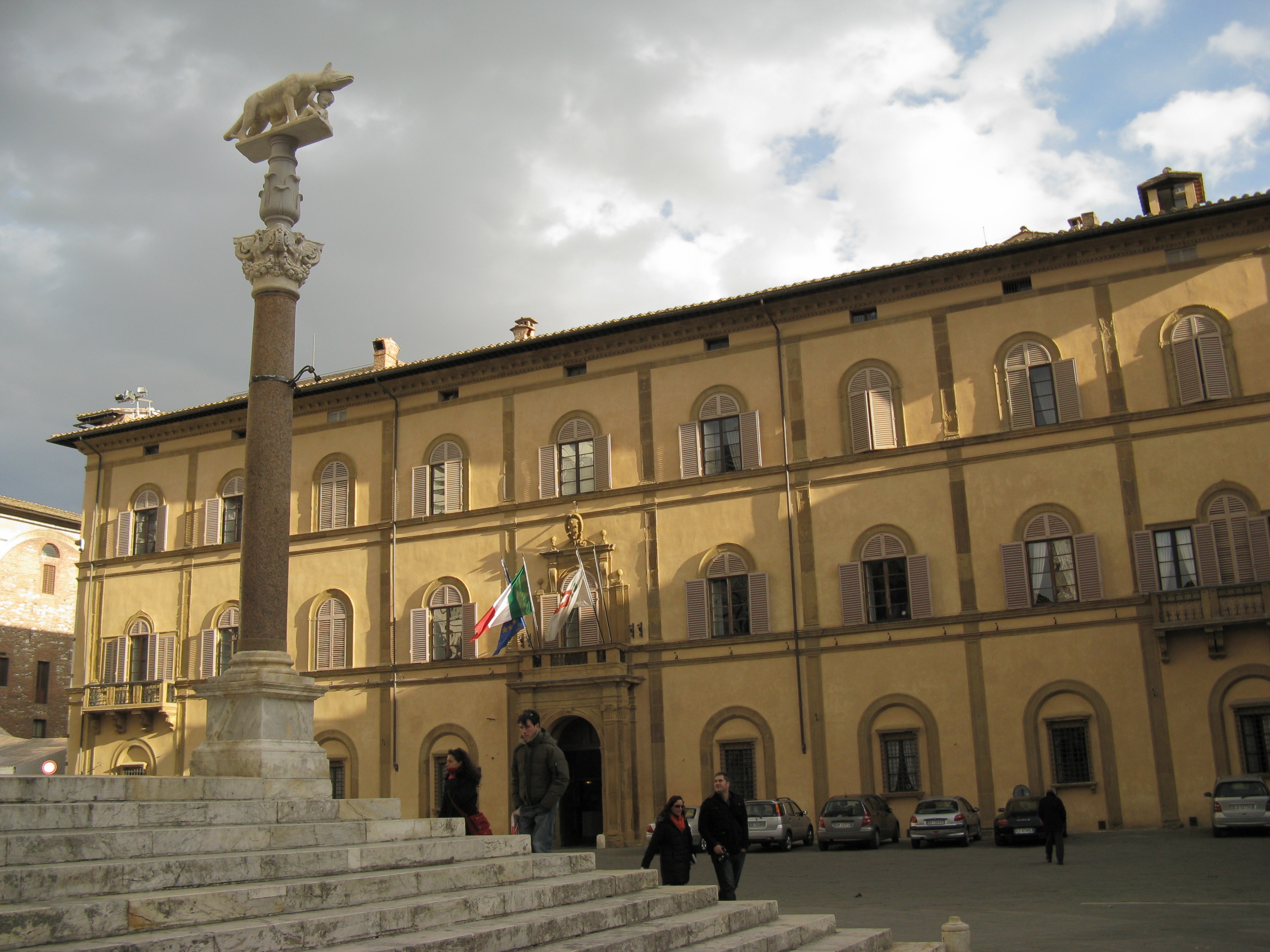
Siena

=== Municipalities ===
Tuscany is also divided in 287 comuni (municipalities), which have even more history, having been established in the Middle Ages when they were the main places of government. 18 comuni (10 provincial capitals) have more than 45,000 inhabitants, a large majority of which are ruled by the centre-left coalition.

Provincial capitals

Municipality	Inhabitants	Mayor	Party	Election
Florence	370,702	Sara Funaro	PD	2024
Prato	187,994	Matteo Biffoni	PD	2026
Livorno	161,084	Luca Salvetti	PD	2024
Arezzo	100,140	Marcello Comanducci	FdI	2026
Pistoia	90,226	Giovanni Capecchi	EV	2026
Pisa	88,332	Michele Conti	Lega	2023
Lucca	84,928	Matteo Pardini	Ind (centre-right)	2022
Grosseto	82,284	Antonfrancesco Vivarelli Colonna	Ind (centre-right)	2021
Massa	71,006	Francesco Persiani	Lega	2023
Siena	54,561	Nicoletta Fabio	Ind (centre-right)	2023

Other municipalities

Cities with more than 45,000 inhabitants.

Municipality	Inhabitants	Mayor	Party	Election
Carrara	65,612	Serena Arrighi	PD	2022
Viareggio	64,564	Giorgio Del Ghingaro	PD	2020
Scandicci	50,304	Claudia Sereni	PD	2024
Sesto Fiorentino	48,780	Lorenzo Falchi	SI	2021
Empoli	47,997	Alessio Mantellassi	PD	2024
Capannori	46,355	Giordano Del Chiaro	PD	2024
Campi Bisenzio	45,325	Andrea Tagliaferri	SI	2023
Cascina	45,143	Michelangelo Betti	SI	2020

== Parties and elections ==
=== Latest regional election ===
In the latest regional election, which took place on 12–13 October 2025, incumbent president Eugenio Giani of the Democratic Party (PD) was re-elected, by beating Alessandro Tomasi of the Brothers of Italy. The PD was by far the largest party with 34.4% of the vote.

12–13 October 2025 Tuscan regional election results
Candidates	Votes	%	Seats	Parties	Votes	%	Seats
Eugenio Giani	752,487	53.92	1	Democratic Party	437,313	34.43	15
Eugenio Giani	752,487	53.92	1	Giani for President – Reformist House	112,564	8.86	4
Eugenio Giani	752,487	53.92	1	Greens and Left Alliance	89,057	7.01	3
Eugenio Giani	752,487	53.92	1	Five Star Movement	55,158	4.34	2
Eugenio Giani	752,487	53.92	1	Total	694,092	54.64	24
Alessandro Tomasi	570,739	40.90	1	Brothers of Italy	340,202	26.78	12
Alessandro Tomasi	570,739	40.90	1	Forza Italia – UDC	78,404	6.17	2
Alessandro Tomasi	570,739	40.90	1	Lega Toscana	55,684	4.38	1
Alessandro Tomasi	570,739	40.90	1	It's Time – Tomasi for President	30,122	2.37	0
Alessandro Tomasi	570,739	40.90	1	Us Moderates	14,564	1.15	0
Alessandro Tomasi	570,739	40.90	1	Total	518,976	40.85	15
Antonella Bundu	72,321	5.18	0	Red Tuscany	57,250	4.51	0
Blank and invalid votes	39,782	2.77					
Total candidates	1,395,547	100.00	2	Total parties	1,270,318	100.0	39
Registered voters/turnout	1,435,329	47.73					
Source: Tuscan Region – Results

== See also ==
- Politics of Italy
