= Elections in Tuscany =

This page gathers the results of elections in Tuscany.

== Regional elections ==
=== Latest regional election ===
In the latest regional election, which took place on 12–13 October 2025, incumbent president Eugenio Giani of the Democratic Party (PD) was re-elected, by beating Alessandro Tomasi of the Brothers of Italy. The PD was by far the largest party with 34.4% of the vote.

12–13 October 2025 Tuscan regional election results
Candidates	Votes	%	Seats	Parties	Votes	%	Seats
Eugenio Giani	752,484	53.92	1	Democratic Party	437,313	34.43	15
Eugenio Giani	752,484	53.92	1	Giani for President – Reformist House	112,564	8.86	4
Eugenio Giani	752,484	53.92	1	Greens and Left Alliance	89,064	7.01	3
Eugenio Giani	752,484	53.92	1	Five Star Movement	55,158	4.34	2
Eugenio Giani	752,484	53.92	1	Total	694,099	54.64	24
Alessandro Tomasi	570,741	40.90	1	Brothers of Italy	340,202	26.78	12
Alessandro Tomasi	570,741	40.90	1	Forza Italia – UDC	78,404	6.17	2
Alessandro Tomasi	570,741	40.90	1	Lega Toscana	55,684	4.38	1
Alessandro Tomasi	570,741	40.90	1	It's Time – Tomasi for President	30,122	2.37	0
Alessandro Tomasi	570,741	40.90	1	Us Moderates	14,564	1.15	0
Alessandro Tomasi	570,741	40.90	1	Total	518,976	40.85	15
Antonella Bundu	72,322	5.18	0	Red Tuscany	57,246	4.51	0
Blank and invalid votes	39,782	2.77					
Total candidates	1,395,547	100.00	2	Total parties	1,270,321	100.0	39
Registered voters/turnout	1,435,329	47.73					
Source: Tuscan Region – Results

=== List of previous regional elections ===
- 1970 Tuscan regional election
- 1975 Tuscan regional election
- 1980 Tuscan regional election
- 1985 Tuscan regional election
- 1990 Tuscan regional election
- 1995 Tuscan regional election
- 2000 Tuscan regional election
- 2005 Tuscan regional election
- 2010 Tuscan regional election
- 2015 Tuscan regional election
- 2020 Tuscan regional election
