= Lidia Bai =

Italian politician (born 1957)

Member of the Regional Council of Tuscany
- Incumbent
- Assumed office 25 November 2025

Mayor of Massa Marittima
- In office 14 June 2004 – 26 May 2014
- Preceded by: Luca Sani
- Succeeded by: Marcello Giuntini

Personal details
- Born: 6 June 1957 (age 69) Massa Marittima, Province of Grosseto, Italy
- Party: Democratic Party

Lidia Bai (born 6 June 1957) is an Italian politician who has served as a member of the Regional Council of Tuscany since November 2025.

== Life and career ==
Born in Massa Marittima, province of Grosseto, Bai attended the local classical high school and then graduated in philosophy from the University of Siena. In 1979, she began working as an employee at Banca Monte dei Paschi di Siena.

In 1990, she was elected to the Massa Marittima City Council for the Democratic Party of the Left, where she later served as chair of the Equal Opportunities Commission (1995–1999) and as assessor for tourism, culture, productive activities, and equal opportunities (1999–2004).

On 14 June 2004, she was elected mayor of Massa Marittima and was re-elected for a second term in June 2009. During these years, Bai held several positions in public institutions, including president of the Comunità Montana Colline Metallifere (2005–2007) and president of the Unione di Comuni Montana Colline Metallifere from April to October 2013.

Bai played a key role in the establishment and management of the Technological and Archaeological Park of the Colline Metallifere Grossetane, first as vice president of the provisional management committee from 2011 to 2015, and later as president of the park from 8 January 2016 to 2 May 2024. Elected to the executive committee of Federparchi in February 2023, she was subsequently elected to the governing board of the Europarc Federation on 6 November 2024.

In the 2025 Tuscan regional elections, Bai ran as a Democratic Party candidate for the Regional Council of Tuscany. She ranked first among the unelected candidates in the Grosseto constituency with 3,491 preference votes, just behind former regional assessor Leonardo Marras. In November 2025, following Marras's reappointment as assessor in Eugenio Giani's second cabinet, Bai was declared a member of the Regional Council.
