= Andrea Ulmi =

Italian politician (born 1957)

Member of the Regional Council of Tuscany
- In office 8 October 2020 – 11 October 2025

Personal details
- Born: 4 March 1957 (age 69) Grosseto, Italy
- Party: Lega (2015–24); Us Moderates (since 2025)
- Education: University of Florence; University of Siena
- Profession: Dentist

Andrea Ulmi (born 4 March 1957) is an Italian dentist and politician who served as a member of the Regional Council of Tuscany from 2020 to 2025.

== Life and career ==
Born in Grosseto on 4 March 1957 to Ulisse, a doctor, Ulmi graduated in medicine and surgery from the University of Florence, specializing in odontostomatology at the University of Siena. He obtained two postgraduate master's degrees, one in Padua and one in Florence. He was the president of the Provincial Commission of Dentists of Grosseto and a member of the provincial council of the Order of Physicians and Dentists. He served for twelve years as president of the local section of ANDI (National Association of Italian Dentists) as well as president and regional secretary of the Tuscan branch of the same trade union organization.

Ulmi entered politics in 2011, running for the municipal council of Grosseto for a civic list in support of the mayoral candidacy of Mario Lolini from the People of Freedom party. Despite Lolini's defeat, Ulmi was elected to the city council. He later joined the Lega, and in 2016 he was re-elected as a councilor. In 2017, he was appointed provincial secretary of the party.

In 2020, he was elected to the Regional Council of Tuscany in the Grosseto constituency, receiving 5,837 votes. Ulmi left the Lega in March 2024.

In the 2025 Tuscan regional election, he ran for the Regional Council on the Us Moderates list, in support of the center-right candidate Alessandro Tomasi. The list performed below expectations, reaching only 1.15% of the vote, and Ulmi was not re‑elected.
