= Donatella Spadi =

Italian politician (born 1959)

Member of the Regional Council of Tuscany
- In office 28 October 2020 – 11 October 2025

Personal details
- Born: 4 September 1959 (age 67) Roccastrada, Province of Grosseto, Italy
- Party: Democratic Party
- Education: University of Siena
- Profession: Physician

Donatella Spadi (born 4 September 1959) is an Italian physician and politician who served as a member of the Regional Council of Tuscany from 2020 to 2025.

== Life and career ==
Spadi was born in Roccastrada, province of Grosseto, on 4 September 1959, but she moved with her family to Follonica at the age of six. She graduated with a degree in medicine and surgery from the University of Siena in 1993.

After spending several years in ambulance rescue and being part of the Pegaso air rescue team, Spadi joined the emergency department of the Sant'Andrea Hospital of Massa Marittima. In 2010, she became the head of the department and in 2017, she was promoted to chief director. Also in 2017, Spadi was elected to the council of the Order of Doctors.

In July 2020, she entered politics and was a candidate in the Tuscan regional elections for the Democratic Party in the Grosseto constituency. She joined the Regional Council of Tuscany on 28 October 2020, replacing Leonardo Marras, who was appointed regional assessor. In the Tuscan assembly, Spadi served as the vice-president secretary of the Internal areas Commission (2021–2024), and vice-president secretary of the Third Commission for health, social policies, housing policies, emigration and immigration, and sports (2024–2025).

Spadi did not seek re-election and ended her term in October 2025.

== Personal life ==
Since 2007, Spadi has been married to architect Luciano Catoni.
