= Antonella Bundu =

Italian politician and activist

Member of the Florence City Council
- In office 2019–2024

Personal details
- Born: Antonella Moro Bundu; December 4, 1969 (age 55) Florence, Italy
- Political party: Communist Refoundation Party

Antonella Moro Bundu (born 4 December 1969) is an Italian politician and activist. She served as a city council member of Florence from 2019 to 2024, leading the left opposition "Sinistra Progetto Comune" group.

In 2019 she ran for the post of Mayor of Florence, making her the first black woman to run for mayor of a major Italian city. She also ran for President of Tuscany in the 2025 Tuscan regional election receiving 5% of the total votes.

== Biography ==
Antonella Bundu was born in Florence in 1969, the daughter of a Florentine mother and a Sierra Leonean father. In the late 1980s she studied in Liverpool, which she recalls as a "politically charged city" after the Toxteth riots: "I was studying black history in the city's libraries, and participated actively in the neightbourhood's protests."

An ex-DJ and activist for Oxfam, Bundu was one of the first on the scene at the 2018 Florence shooting of the Senegalese immigrant Idy Diene. She took part in the anti-racist protests which followed his death, and after making a speech at the Alfieri Theatre was invited to run for mayor on behalf of a radical-left coalition including Power to the People and the Communist Refoundation Party. In the 2019 Mayoral election, she received 14,016 votes (7.29%). In October 2025, she received the honorary member card of Movimento RadicalSocialista.

== Electoral history ==
2019 Florence mayoral election
Party	Candidate	Votes	%
Democratic Party	Dario Nardella	109,733	57.05%
Centre-right	Ubaldo Bocci	47,692	24.79%
Firenze Citta Aperta	Antonella Bundu	14,016	7.29%
Five Star Movement	Roberto De Blasi	12,693	6.60%
Italian Communist Party	Gabriele Giacomelli	1,358	0.71%
Greens	Andres Lasso	3,493	1.82%
CasaPound	Saverio Di Giulio	972	0.51%
Total votes		192,350	100.00%

2025 Tuscan presidential election
Party	Candidate	Votes	%
Centre-left	Eugenio Giani	752,484	53.92%
Centre-right	Alessandro Tomasi	570,741	40.90%
Red Tuscany	Antonella Bundu	72,322	5.18%
Total votes		1,395,547	100.00%
