= Samuele Bertinelli =

Italian politician

Mayor of Pistoia
- In office 8 May 2012 – 26 June 2017
- Preceded by: Renzo Berti
- Succeeded by: Alessandro Tomasi

Personal details
- Born: 21 March 1976 (age 50) Pistoia, Italy
- Party: Democratic Party
- Occupation: Politician; Mayor

Samuele Bertinelli (born 21 March 1976) is an Italian politician. He is the former mayor of Pistoia, in office from 8 May 2012 to 26 June 2017, and a member of the Democratic Party. In 2012, he was a candidate for mayor of Pistoia, at the head of a center coalition, and was elected in the first round with 59% of the votes, against 16% collected by the center-right candidate, Anna Maria Ida Celesti. Bertinelli was born in Pistoia, Italy, graduated in philosophy, and engaged in politics at a very young age. He joined the Democrats of the Left at age 22 (1998) and was elected city councilor of Pistoia, becoming president of the culture committee. In the subsequent administration, from 2002 to 2007, he was re-elected and appointed leader of the Democrats of the Left in the municipal council.

Political offices
Preceded by Renzo Berti	Mayor of Pistoia; 2012–2017	Succeeded by Alessandro Tomasi
