= Alberto Monaci =

Italian politician (1941–2024)

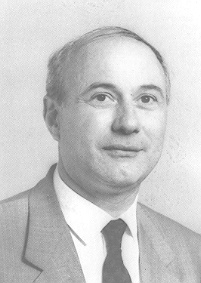
- Monaci in 1987

Member of the Chamber of Deputies of Italy for Siena-Arezzo-Grosseto
- In office 2 July 1987 – 22 April 1992

Member of the Regional Council of Tuscany
- In office 9 May 2000 – 17 June 2015

President of the Regional Council of Tuscany
- In office 23 April 2010 – 17 June 2015
- Preceded by: Riccardo Nencini
- Succeeded by: Eugenio Giani

Personal details
- Born: 28 January 1941 Asciano, Italy
- Died: 14 November 2024 (aged 83) Siena, Italy
- Party: DC; PPI; PD
- Occupation: Banker

Alberto Monaci (28 January 1941 – 14 November 2024) was an Italian banker and politician. A member of Christian Democracy, he served in the Chamber of Deputies from 1987 to 1992.

He later joined the Democratic Party and also served as a member of the Regional Council of Tuscany from 2000 to 2015, presiding over the council from 2010 to 2015.

Monaci died in Siena on 14 November 2024, at the age of 83.
