= Luca Minucci =

Italian politician (born 1983)

Member of the Regional Council of Tuscany
- Incumbent
- Assumed office 29 October 2025

Personal details
- Born: 11 May 1983 (age 42) Grosseto, Italy
- Party: Brothers of Italy
- Profession: Entrepreneur

Luca Minucci (born 11 May 1983) is an Italian politician who has served as a member of the Regional Council of Tuscany since October 2025.

== Life and career ==
Minucci was born in Grosseto on 11 May 1983, into a family of small business owners originally from Magliano in Toscana, and grew up between Albinia and Grosseto. After completing high school, he began working in his family's food and hospitality business — including artisanal ice cream making — and later in the tourism sector between Orbetello and Monte Argentario.

In 2012, Minucci was among the founders of Brothers of Italy in the province of Grosseto, where he has since held several positions, including local secretary of Orbetello, member of the national assembly and the regional board. Since 2023, he has been the party's provincial coordinator.

In the 2016 municipal elections, he supported the centre-right candidate Andrea Casamenti in his bid for mayor of Orbetello and was elected to the city council, where he was appointed assessor for Environment and Waste Management, Public Safety, Transport, and Sports. He was re-elected in 2021 and confirmed in his role as assessor.

In the 2025 Tuscan regional election, Minucci ran as a Brothers of Italy candidate for the Regional Council of Tuscany in the Grosseto constituency. On 12 October 2025, he was elected councillor with 6,537 votes and was officially proclaimed on 29 October.
