= Caterina Biti =

Italian politician (born 1976)

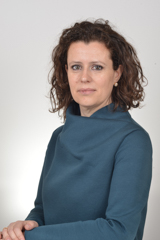
- Biti in 2018

Member of the Senate
- In office 23 March 2018 – 12 October 2022
- Constituency: Tuscany – P01

Personal details
- Born: 27 September 1976 (age 49)
- Party: Democratic Party

Caterina Biti (born 27 September 1976) is an Italian politician. From 2018 to 2022, she was a member of the Senate. From 2014 to 2018, she served as president of the municipal council of Florence.
