= 3V Movement =

3V Movement Movimento 3V
- President: Alessandra Bocchi
- Secretary: Luca Teodori
- Founded: January 2019
- Ideology: Anti-vaccination; Anti-science; Single issue politics Euroscepticism
- Political position: Big tent
- National affiliation: Vita (2022–)
- Chamber of Deputies: 0 / 400
- Senate: 0 / 200
- European Parliament: 0 / 76
- Regional Councils: 0 / 896

Website
- www.movimento3v.it

The 3V Movement (Italian: Movimento 3V, M3V), whose complete name is "Vaccines We Want Truth Movement" (Italian: Movimento Vaccini Vogliamo Verità), is an anti-vaccination party in Italy.

== History ==
The 3V Movement was founded in January 2019, with the aim of politically representing all the anti-vaccination movements in the country; its president is Alessandra Bocchi, while its secretary is Luca Teodori. By 2020, the M3V had taken part in several regional elections, gaining very poor results: its best result was reached in the Venetian regional election with 0.7% of votes.

The 3V Movement slightly gained attention amid the COVID-19 vaccination campaign in Italy. In the Italian local elections of 3–4 October 2021, the M3V elected its mayoral candidates in the municipal councils of Rimini (Matteo Angelini, who got 4.1% of the votes) and Trieste (Ugo Rossi, who got 4.5% of the votes). On 21 September Ugo Rossi was arrested for insulting a public official and causing aggravated injuries during an attack on two Carabinieri in a dispute that broke out over another candidate of the movement not wearing a mask in a post office.

== Electoral results ==
=== Regional Councils ===
Region	Election year	Votes	%	Seats	+/−
Veneto	2020	14,916	0.7	0 / 51	–
Emilia-Romagna	2020	11,187	0.5	0 / 50	–
Tuscany	2020	6,974	0.4	0 / 41	–
Marche	2020	2,689	0.4	0 / 31	–
