= 2025 Tuscan regional election =

Election in Tuscany, Italy

- 12–13 October 2025

All 41 seats to the Regional Council of Tuscany
- Opinion polls
- Registered: 3,007,061
- Turnout: 47.73% (▼14.87%)
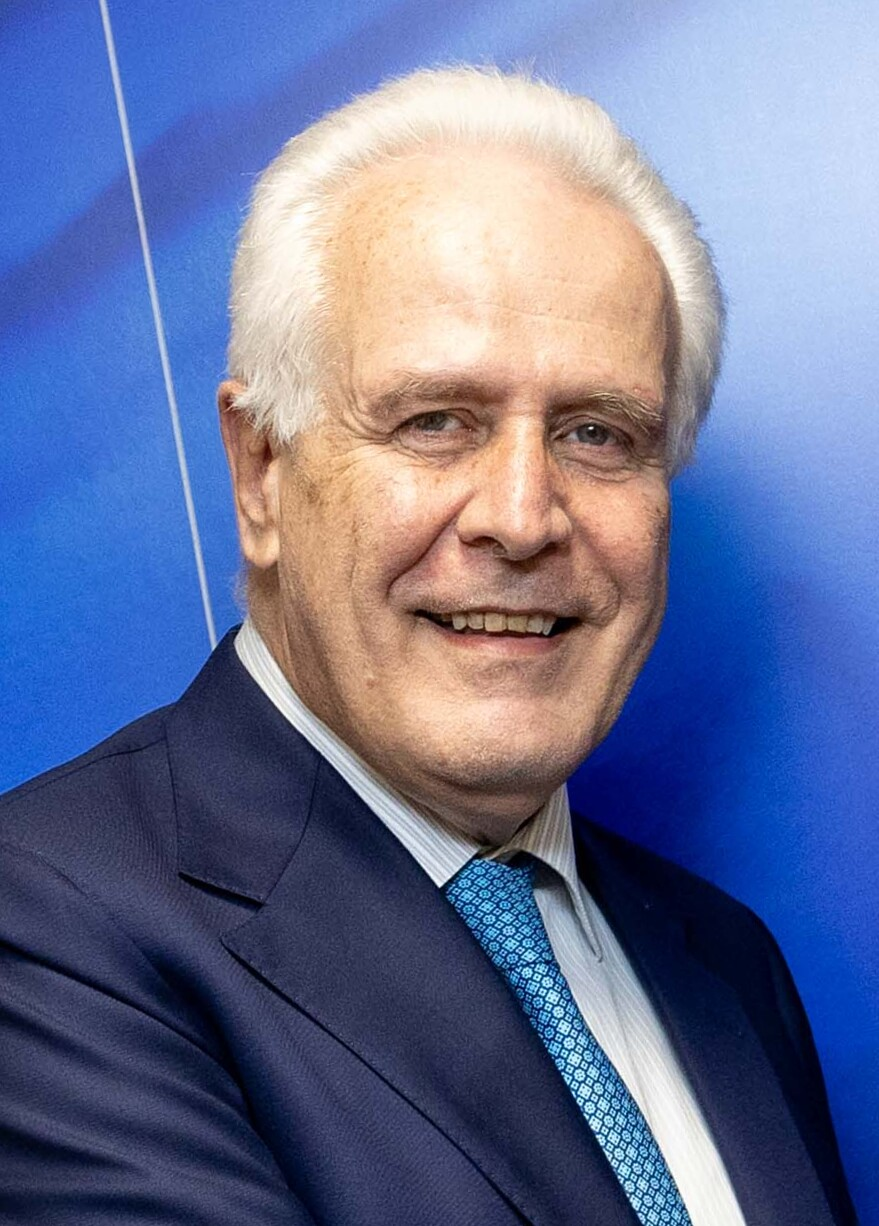

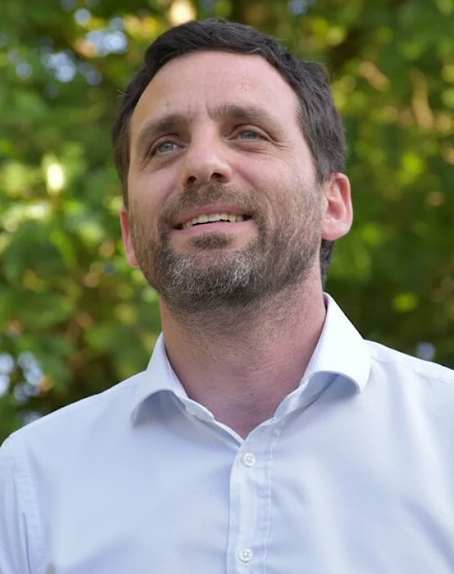
	Majority party	Minority party
Leader	Eugenio Giani	Alessandro Tomasi
Party	PD	FdI
Alliance	Centre-left	Centre-right
Seats won	25	16
Seat change	Steady	▲2
Popular vote	752,484	570,741
Percentage	53.92%	40.90%
Swing	▼1.10% (Note: This is compared to the total of Eugenio Giani (centre-left coalition) and Irene Galletti (Five Star Movement) in 2020. Compared to Giani's 2020 centre-left coalition, it is a ▲5.30% swing.)	▲0.44%
- Map of the election result
President before election
Eugenio Giani
PD
Elected President
Eugenio Giani
PD

The 2025 Tuscan regional election took place in Tuscany, Italy, from 12 to 13 October 2025. In line with polls prediction and the region's left-leaning status, the incumbent president Eugenio Giani of the centre-left coalition was re-elected to a second term with 54% of the vote, compared to the 41% of centre-right coalition candidate Alessandro Tomasi. The left-wing candidate Antonella Bundu obtained 5% of the vote, slightly outperforming polls, but her supporting coalition of parties narrowly failed to reach the electoral threshold and did not enter the Regional Council of Tuscany.

== Electoral law ==
To elect its own regional council, Tuscany uses its own legislation of 2014. The councillors are elected in provincial constituency by proportional representation using the D'Hondt method. The constituency of Florence is further divided into four subconstituencies. Preferential voting is allowed: a maximum of two preferences can be expressed for candidates of the same party list and provided the two chosen candidates are of different gender. Additionally, the electoral threshold is 3% of valid votes for lists belonging to a political coalition that obtained at least 10% of the total votes, or 5% for lists running individually or part of a coalition that did not obtain 10% of the total votes. Under this electoral system, parties are grouped in alliances supporting a candidate for the post of President of Tuscany. The candidate receiving at least 40% of the votes is elected to the post and his/her list (or the coalition) is awarded a majority of 23 seats in the Regional Council (24 seats with more than 45% of the vote). If no candidate gets more than 40% of the votes, a run-off is held fourteen days later, where the two top candidates from the first round run against each other. The winning candidate is then ensured a majority in the Regional Council.

== Council apportionment ==
According to the official 2011 Italian census, the 41 seats to the Regional Council (including that reserved to the president-elect), which must be covered by proportional representation, are so distributed between the ten Tuscan provinces. The Metropolitan City of Florence is further divided into four smaller electoral constituencies: the first constituency consists solely of the city of Florence, the second is located to the east of the city, the third consists of the western part of the metropolitan city around Empoli, and the fourth consists of Florence's closest western suburbs (Scandicci and Sesto Fiorentino).

Seat distribution of the Regional Council of Tuscany
Provinces	Seats
Arezzo	4
Florence	11
Grosseto	2
Livorno	4
Lucca	4
Massa and Carrara	2
Pisa	4
Pistoia	3
Prato	3
Siena	3
President	1
Total	41

== Parties and candidates ==
=== Presidential candidate ===
Candidate	Experience	Alliance
Eugenio Giani	President of Tuscany (2020–present); President of Regional Council of Tuscany (2015–2020); President of City Council of Florence (2009–2014)	Centre-left coalition
Alessandro Tomasi	Mayor of Pistoia (2017–present)	Centre-right coalition

=== Parties and coalitions ===
This is a list of the parties and their respective leaders that took part in the election.

Political party or alliance	Constituent lists	Previous result		Candidate
Political party or alliance	Constituent lists	Votes (%)	Seats	Candidate
Centre-left coalition	Democratic Party (PD)	34.7	22	Eugenio Giani
Centre-left coalition	Five Star Movement (M5S)	7.0	2	Eugenio Giani
Centre-left coalition	Greens and Left Alliance (AVS)	—N/a	—N/a	Eugenio Giani
Centre-left coalition	Giani for President – Reformist House (incl. IV, +E, PSI)	—N/a	—N/a	Eugenio Giani
Centre-right coalition	League (incl. PdF)	21.8	8	Alessandro Tomasi
Centre-right coalition	Brothers of Italy (FdI)	13.5	4	Alessandro Tomasi
Centre-right coalition	Forza Italia – UDC (FI–UDC)	4.3	1	Alessandro Tomasi
Centre-right coalition	Us Moderates (NM)	—N/a	—N/a	Alessandro Tomasi
Centre-right coalition	It's Time – Tomasi for President	—N/a	—N/a	Alessandro Tomasi
Red Tuscany (incl. PRC, Pos, PaP)		—N/a	—N/a	Antonella Bundu

== Campaign ==
=== Debates ===
Date	Location	Organizer	Link	Participant			Source
P Present A Absent invitee NI Not invited I Invited				Giani	Tomasi	Bundu	Source
6 October 2025	Tuscany	La Nazione	Video	P	P	P	
7 October 2025	Rome	Sky TG24	Video	P	P	NI	

== Opinion polls ==
=== Presidential candidates ===
Date	Polling firm	Client	Sample size	Margin of error	Giani	Tomasi	Bundu	Others	Lead
30 January 2025	EMG Different	Toscana TV	1,000	±3.1	55	40	–	5	15
27 February 2025	EMG Different	Toscana TV	1,000	±3.1	55.5	38.5	–	6	17
15 May 2025	Winpoll	Scandicci Civica/Insieme Cambiamo Ponsacco	1,000	±2.5	54	36	–	10	18
22 May 2025	EMG Different	Toscana TV	1,000	±3.1	58	37	–	5	21
9 September 2025	Noto	Porta a Porta	800	±3.5	57	39	–	4	18
19 September 2025	Noto	QN–La Nazione	1,000	±2.0	58	40.5	1.5	–	17.5
23 September 2025	EMG Different	Toscana TV	1,000	±3.1	58	40	2	–	18
25 September 2025	SWG S.p.A.	Italian Left	1,006	±3.1	53	44	3	–	9
26 September 2025	Tecnè	Agenzia Dire	800	±3.5	56	42	2	–	14
26 September 2025	Ipsos	Corriere della Sera	800	±3.5	54.8	41.3	3.9	–	13.5

=== Party lists ===
Date published	Polling firm	Client	Sample size	Margin of error	PD	M5S	AVS	IV	FdI	Lega	FI	NM	Tomasi	TR
19 September 2025	Noto	QN–La Nazione	1,000	±3.1	36	5	8	8	19	9	6.5	1.5	5.5	1.5
23 September 2025	EMG Different	Toscana TV	1,000	±3.1	35	6.5	8	8	23	4.5	9.5	1.5	2	2
25 September 2025	SWG S.p.A.	Italian Left	1,006	±3.1	33	6	8.5	5.5	27.5	8.5	5	1.5	2.5	2
26 September 2025	Ipsos	Corriere della Sera	800	±3.5	31	7.7	7.9	8	25	6.1	6.9	2.2	1.5	3.7

== Outcome ==
=== Results ===
12–13 October 2025 Tuscan regional election results
Candidates	Votes	%	Seats	Parties	Votes	%	Seats
Eugenio Giani	752,487	53.92	1	Democratic Party	437,313	34.43	15
Eugenio Giani	752,487	53.92	1	Giani for President – Reformist House	112,564	8.86	4
Eugenio Giani	752,487	53.92	1	Greens and Left Alliance	89,057	7.01	3
Eugenio Giani	752,487	53.92	1	Five Star Movement	55,158	4.34	2
Eugenio Giani	752,487	53.92	1	Total	694,092	54.64	24
Alessandro Tomasi	570,739	40.90	1	Brothers of Italy	340,202	26.78	12
Alessandro Tomasi	570,739	40.90	1	Forza Italia – UDC	78,404	6.17	2
Alessandro Tomasi	570,739	40.90	1	Lega Toscana	55,684	4.38	1
Alessandro Tomasi	570,739	40.90	1	It's Time – Tomasi for President	30,122	2.37	0
Alessandro Tomasi	570,739	40.90	1	Us Moderates	14,564	1.15	0
Alessandro Tomasi	570,739	40.90	1	Total	518,976	40.85	15
Antonella Bundu	72,321	5.18	0	Red Tuscany	57,250	4.51	0
Blank and invalid votes	39,782	2.77					
Total candidates	1,395,547	100.00	2	Total parties	1,270,318	100.0	39
Registered voters/turnout	1,435,329	47.73					
Source: Tuscan Region – Results

Popular vote by party
PD	34.43%
FdI	26.78%
Giani–CR	8.86%
AVS	7.01%
FI–UDC	6.17%
TR	4.51%
Lega	4.38%
M5S	4.34%
Tomasi	2.37%
NM	1.15%

Popular vote by president
Giani	53.92%
Tomasi	40.90%
Bundu	5.18%

Seat summary
Centre-left	60.97%
Centre-right	39.03%

=== Turnout ===
The electorate for the election was divided into 273 municipalities (comuni) containing 3,922 polling stations across the region for 3,007,061 voters.

Constituency	Voter turnout				Previous election	
Constituency	Sunday, October 12			Monday, October 13	Previous election	
Constituency	12:00 PM	19:00 PM	23:00 PM	15:00 PM	Previous election	
Arezzo	8.80%	28.38%	36.03%	47.77%	64.60%	▼16.83%
Florence	11.48%	31.63%	40.14%	52.63%	66.47%	▼13.84%
Grosseto	9.97%	26.17%	32.15%	44.93%	60.87%	▼15.94%
Livorno	9.62%	24.90%	30.87%	42.29%	57.34%	▼15.05%
Lucca	8.09%	23.34%	29.38%	40.42%	56.70%	▼16.28%
Massa-Carrara	7.86%	22.86%	28.80%	40.80%	54.70%	▼13.90%
Pisa	10.07%	28.76%	37.42%	50.18%	65.66%	▼15.48%
Pistoia	10.78%	29.95%	37.55%	49.07%	62.04%	▼12.97%
Prato	10.65%	30.96%	39.62%	50.82%	64.80%	▼13.98%
Siena	9.36%	28.02%	36.40%	49.07%	64.85%	▼15.78%
(Tuscany) Total	9.96%	28.15%	35.70%	47.73%	62.60%	▼14.87%

=== Analysis ===
Giani defeated Tomasi by 13% in the left-leaning region, winning majorities in six of the ten provinces (Florence, Siena, Livorno, Pisa, Arezzo, and Prato) and a plurality in Lucca. Tomasi won narrow 0.7% pluralities in Grosseto and Massa-Carrara, and was 277 votes short of a majority in Pistoia. Giani won strong majorities in and around Florence, Pisa, and Livorno. Bundu came third with 5% of the vote, while the left-wing list supporting her did not reach the 5% threshold for individual lists. In the region's 39 comuni with populations over 20,000, Giani won in 31, including Florence's suburb of Sesto Fiorentino, where he won over two-thirds of the vote while the AVS list received more votes than PD. Tomasi's strongest result was in Montecatini Terme, which he won by 20%, while Bundu's strongest result was in Piombino, where she received one eighth of the votes. As a result, Tuscany maintained its 150-year old trend as part of Italy's Red Belt and its status as a red region (regione rossa).

Giani V Tomasi V Bundu by province
Province	Eugenio Giani	Alessandro Tomasi	Antonella Bundu
Massa-Carrara	31,719 47.13%	32,242 47.91%	3,336 4.96%
Lucca	69,169 49.59%	63,992 45.87%	6,333 4.54%
Pistoia	54,196 47.01%	57,362 49.76%	3,718 3.23%
Prato	45,273 50.69%	40,586 45.44%	3,461 3.87%
Florence	232,286 58.28%	137,557 34.51%	28,754 7.21%
Pisa	90,907 54.81%	66,516 40.11%	8,421 5.08%
Livorno	67,042 56.99%	41.894 35.61%	8,712 7.41%
Arezzo	66,095 52.36%	56,787 44.99%	3,346 2.65%
Siena	58,622 59.40%	36,096 36.57%	3,975 4.03%
Grosseto	37,175 48.19%	37,709 48.88%	2,266 2.94%

Giani V Tomasi V Bundu by major cities
City	Eugenio Giani	Alessandro Tomasi	Antonella Bundu
Florence	84,410 56.11%	52,975 35.22%	13,041 8.67%
Prato	33,636 51.40%	29,212 44.64%	2,593 3.96%
Livorno	35,946 62.62%	17,024 29.66%	4,431 7.72%
Arezzo	17,895 50.74%	16,474 46.71%	902 2.56%
Pisa	21,161 57.65%	13,190 35.93%	2,356 6.42%
Pistoia	19,593 49.13%	18,921 47.44%	1,367 3.43%
Lucca	16,160 49.98%	14,514 44.89%	1,659 5.13%
Grosseto	14,146 46.99%	15,161 50.36%	797 2.65%
Massa	12,501 53.29%	9,649 41.13%	1,310 5.58%
Viareggio	11,506 53.98%	8,759 41.09%	1,050 4.93%
Carrara	9,061 46.90%	9,163 47.43%	1,094 5.66%
Siena	12,175 55.73%	8,878 40.64%	794 3.63%
Empoli	10,713 59.47%	5,852 32.49%	1,448 8.04%
Scandicci	12,275 61.20%	6,665 33.23%	1,116 5.56%
Sesto Fiorentino	15,147 68.59%	5,700 25.81%	1,236 5.60%
Campi Bisenzio	7,791 51.88%	6,224 41.45%	1,002 6.67%
Capannori	7,210 44.79%	8,047 49.99%	841 5.22%
Cascina	10,328 57.61%	6,858 38.26%	740 4.13%

=== Elected councilors ===
Party / List	Councilor elected	Preference votes	Constituency
Democratic Party	Eugenio Giani	President-elect	
Democratic Party	Iacopo Melio	Regional candidate	
Democratic Party	Simona Querci	Regional candidate	
Democratic Party	Filippo Boni	10,924	Arezzo
Democratic Party	Leonardo Marras	13,419	Grosseto
Democratic Party	Alessandro Franchi	6,605	Livorno
Democratic Party	Mario Puppa	9,159	Lucca
Democratic Party	Gianni Lorenzetti	10,862	Massa-Carrara
Democratic Party	Antonio Mazzeo	13,274	Pisa
Democratic Party	Alessandra Nardini	14,528	Pisa
Democratic Party	Bernard Dika	14,282	Pistoia
Democratic Party	Simone Bezzini	12,656	Siena
Democratic Party	Matteo Biffoni	22,155	Prato
Democratic Party	Andrea Vannucci	6,104	Florence 1
Democratic Party	Serena Spinelli	8,180	Florence 2
Democratic Party	Brenda Barnini	13,683	Florence 3
Giani for President–Reformist House	Vittorio Salotti	2,964	Lucca
Giani for President–Reformist House	Federico Eligi	1,798	Pisa
Giani for President–Reformist House	Stefania Saccardi	5,469	Florence 1
Giani for President–Reformist House	Francesco Casini	3,819	Florence 2
Greens and Left Alliance	Diletta Fallani	1,676	Livorno
Greens and Left Alliance	Massimiliano Ghimenti	4,543	Pisa
Greens and Left Alliance	Lorenzo Falchi	5,282	Florence 1
Five Star Movement	Irene Galletti	2,318	Pisa
Five Star Movement	Luca Rossi Romanelli	803	Florence 1
Brothers of Italy	Alessandro Tomasi	Elected as the second-place presidential candidate	
Brothers of Italy	Gabriele Veneri	5,740	Arezzo
Brothers of Italy	Luca Minucci	6,537	Grosseto
Brothers of Italy	Marcella Amadio	5,387	Livorno
Brothers of Italy	Vittorio Fantozzi	8,420	Lucca
Brothers of Italy	Marco Guidi	4,688	Massa-Carrara
Brothers of Italy	Diego Petrucci	8,300	Pisa
Brothers of Italy	Alessandro Capecchi	9,303	Pistoia
Brothers of Italy	Enrico Tucci	4,679	Siena
Brothers of Italy	Chiara La Porta	7,963	Prato
Brothers of Italy	Jacopo Cellai	5,015	Florence 1
Brothers of Italy	Matteo Zoppini	4,271	Florence 2
Brothers of Italy	Claudio Gemelli	3,343	Florence 4
Forza Italia–UdC	Jacopo Maria Ferri	8,940	Massa Carrara
Forza Italia–UdC	Marco Stella	2,131	Florence 1
Lega Toscana	Massimiliano Simoni	Regional candidate	

== See also ==
- 2025 Italian local elections
