= 1980 Tuscan regional election =

← 1975	8 June 1980	1985 →
- All 50 seats to the Regional Council of Tuscany
Party	Vote %	Seats	+/–
PCI	46.5%	25	0
DC	28.7%	15	0
PSI	11.8%	5	+1
MSI	3.7%	1	−1
PSDI	3.1%	1	−1
PRI	2.9%	1	0
PLI	1.3%	1	+1
PdUP	1.1%	1	0
This lists parties that won seats. See the complete results below.
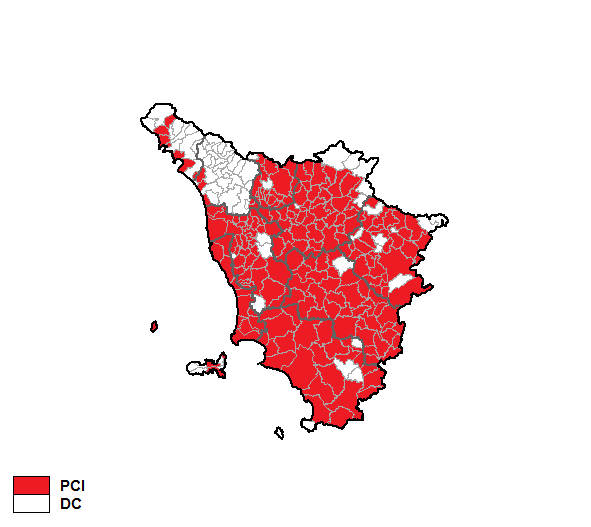
Major party in each municipality.

The Tuscan regional election of 1980 took place on 8 June 1980.

== Electoral law ==
Election was held under proportional representation with provincial constituencies where the largest remainder method with a Droop quota was used. To ensure more proportionality, remained votes and seats were transferred at regional level and calculated at-large.

== Results ==
The Italian Communist Party was by far the largest party. After the election Mario Leone (Italian Socialist Party), the incumbent President of the Region, formed a new government with the Italian Communist Party.

In 1983 a government crisis occurred as the relationship between the Communists and the Socialists had become tense at the national level. Communist Gianfranco Bartolini formed a one-party government and then a new coalition government with the Proletarian Unity Party.

Parties	votes	votes (%)	seats
Italian Communist Party	1,159,489	46.5	25
Christian Democracy	715,747	28.7	15
Italian Socialist Party	293,090	11.8	5
Italian Social Movement	92,243	3.7	1
Italian Democratic Socialist Party	77,729	3.1	1
Italian Republican Party	71,089	2.9	1
Italian Liberal Party	32,002	1.3	1
Proletarian Unity Party	27,012	1.1	1
Proletarian Democracy	26,621	1.1	-
Democratic Party – List for Trieste	221	0.0	-
Total	2,495,243	100.0	50

Source: Ministry of the Interior
