= Alessandro Tomasi =

Italian politician (born 1979)

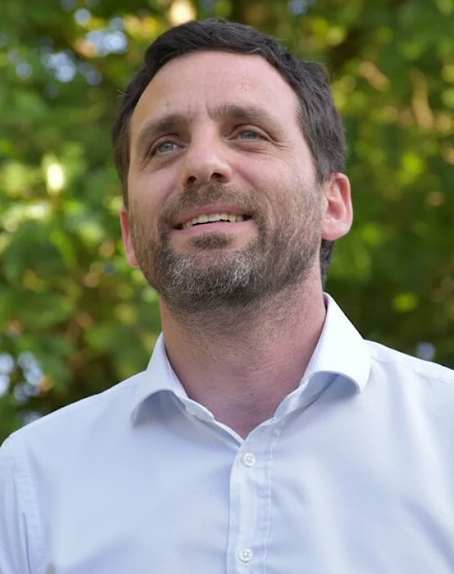

Member of the Regional Council of Tuscany
- Incumbent
- Assumed office 29 October 2025

Mayor of Pistoia
- In office 26 June 2017 – 1 December 2025
- Preceded by: Samuele Bertinelli
- Succeeded by: Giovanni Capecchi

Personal details
- Born: 18 September 1979 (age 47) Pistoia, Tuscany
- Party: Brothers of Italy (since 2013)
- Other political affiliations: AN (until 2009); PdL (2009-2013)
- Education: University of Florence

Alessandro Tomasi (born 18 September 1979) is an Italian politician who has served as a member of the Regional Council of Tuscany since October 2025.

== Life and career ==
Tomasi was a member of right-wing parties National Alliance (AN) and The People of Freedom (PdL), and he served as municipal councillor in Pistoia from 2007 to 2017.

He joined Brothers of Italy (FdI) and ran for mayor of Pistoia at the 2017 Italian local elections, supported by a centre-right coalition formed by FdI, Forza Italia (FI), Lega Nord (LN), and the civic list Pistoia Concreta (PC). He was elected on 25 June 2017 and took office on 26 June 2017. In the 2022 elections, he was confirmed as mayor for a second term.

Tomasi was the centre-right candidate for president of Tuscany in the 2025 Tuscan regional election. He lost to incumbent president Eugenio Giani, but entered the Regional Council of Tuscany.

== See also ==
- 2025 Tuscan regional election
- List of mayors of Pistoia

Political offices
Preceded by Samuele Bertinelli	Mayor of Pistoia; 2017–2025	Succeeded by Giovanni Capecchi
