= 1975 Tuscan regional election =

← 1970	15 June 1975	1980 →
- All 50 seats to the Regional Council of Tuscany
Party	Vote %	Seats	+/–
PCI	46.5%	25	+2
DC	28.5%	15	−2
PSI	10.7%	4	+1
MSI	4.2%	2	+1
PSDI	3.9%	2	−1
PRI	2.7%	1	0
PdUP	2.1%	1	New
This lists parties that won seats. See the complete results below.
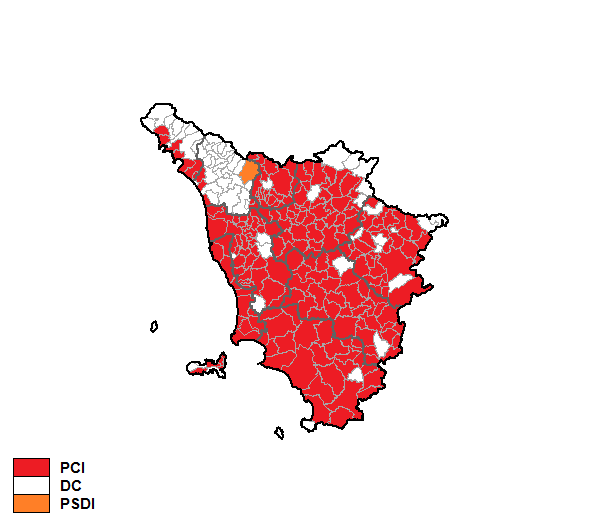
Major party in each municipality.

The Tuscan regional election of 1975 took place on 15 June 1975.

== Electoral law ==
Election was held under proportional representation with provincial constituencies where the largest remainder method with a Droop quota was used. To ensure more proportionality, remained votes and seats were transferred at regional level and calculated at-large.

== Results ==
The Italian Communist Party was by far the largest party. After the election Lelio Lagorio (Italian Socialist Party), the incumbent President of the Region, formed a new government with the Italian Communist Party. In 1978 Mario Leone, another Socialist, took over from Lagorio.

Parties	votes	votes (%)	seats
Italian Communist Party	1,169,858	46.5	25
Christian Democracy	717,338	28.5	15
Italian Socialist Party	269,074	10.7	4
Italian Social Movement	106,580	4.2	2
Italian Democratic Socialist Party	97,649	3.9	2
Italian Republican Party	66,704	2.7	1
Proletarian Unity Party	51,834	2.1	1
Italian Liberal Party	30,096	1.2	-
Popular Unity	7.996	0.3	-
Democratic Socialist Refoundation Union	488	0.0	-
Total	2,517,617	100.0	50

Source: Ministry of the Interior
