= Antonio Mazzeo =

Italian politician (born 1977)

Member of the Regional Council of Tuscany
- Incumbent
- Assumed office 17 June 2015

President of the Regional Council of Tuscany
- In office 19 October 2020 – 10 November 2025
- Preceded by: Eugenio Giani
- Succeeded by: Stefania Saccardi

Personal details
- Born: 22 February 1977 (age 49) Melfi, Basilicata, Italy
- Party: Democratic Party
- Education: University of Pisa
- Profession: Entrepreneur

Antonio Mazzeo (born 22 February 1977) is an Italian politician who has served as a member of the Regional Council of Tuscany since June 2015 and as president of the same council from 2020 to 2025.

== Life and career ==
Mazzeo was born in Melfi, province of Potenza, on 22 February 1977, to a family from Barile. He obtained a degree in electronic engineering from the University of Pisa and later a master's in Innovation Management at the Sant'Anna School of Advanced Studies, after which he started a business in the field of medical diagnostics. In 1996, he settled in Pisa.

A member of the Democratic Party since 2007, he was elected as a city councilor in Pisa in 2008, also serving as the president of the budget committee. Elected as a member of the party's assembly and regional board in 2009, from 2013 to 2018 he was a member of the National Assembly of the party and from July 2015 to March 2018 he served as the deputy secretary of the Tuscan branch.

In 2015, Mazzeo was a candidate in the Tuscan regional elections in the Pisa constituency. He won with 10,515 votes e became a member of the Regional Council of Tuscany on 17 June 2015. He was the promoter of the first regional law on startups and innovation and also promoted the establishment of the Tuscany Innovation Award, organized since 2017.

In 2020, he is re-confirmed as a regional councilor with 12,720 votes and was elected president of the Regional Council of Tuscany on 19 October 2020. In 2025, Mazzeo was re-elected to the Regional Council for his third consecutive term, receiving 13,274 votes.
