= 2020 Tuscan regional election =

Election in Tuscany, Italy

← 2015	20–21 September 2020	2025 →

All 41 seats in the Regional Council
- Turnout: 62.6% (▲14.3%)
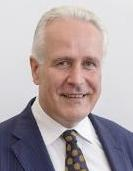

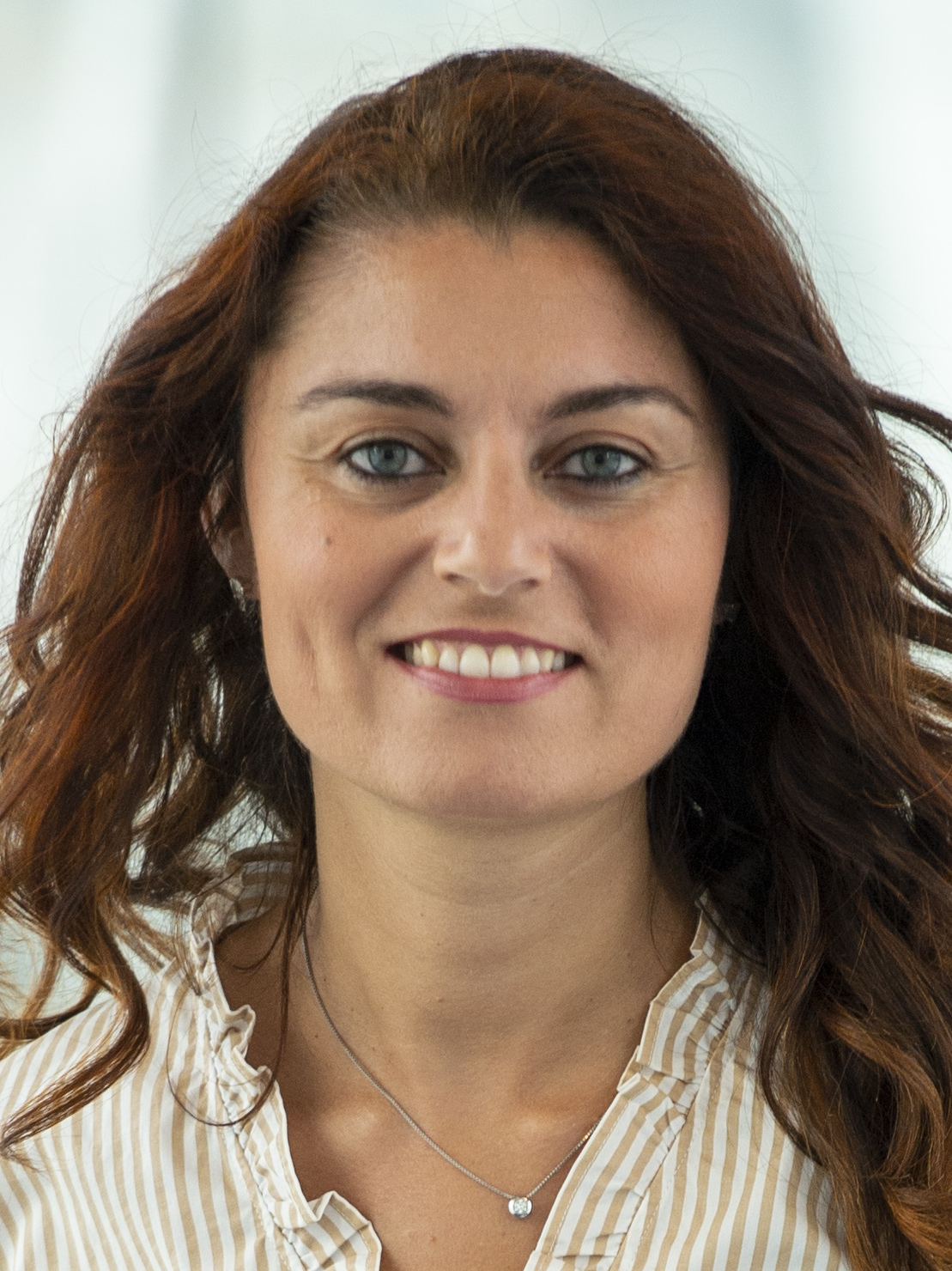
	Majority party	Minority party
Leader	Eugenio Giani	Susanna Ceccardi
Party	Democratic Party	League
Alliance	Centre-left	Centre-right
Seats won	25	14
Seat change	0	▲5
Popular vote	864,310	719,266
Percentage	48.6%	40.5%
Swing	▲0.5%	▲10.1%
President before election
Enrico Rossi
Democratic Party
Elected President
Eugenio Giani
Democratic Party

The 2020 Tuscan regional election was the 7th regional election held in Tuscany, Italy, and took place on 20 and 21 September 2020. It was originally scheduled to take place on 31 May 2020, but it was delayed due to the coronavirus pandemic in Italy. The Democratic candidate, Eugenio Giani, defeated the League candidate, Susanna Ceccardi. Giani took office as President of Tuscany on 8 October 2020.

== Electoral system ==
Tuscany uses its own legislation of 2014 to elect its Regional Council. The councillors are elected in provincial constituencies by proportional representation using the D'Hondt method. The constituency of Florence is further divided into 4 sub-constituencies. Preferential voting is allowed: a maximum of two preferences can be expressed for candidates of the same party list and provided the two chosen candidates are of different gender.

In this system, parties are grouped in alliances supporting a candidate for the post of President of Tuscany. The candidate receiving at least 40% of the votes is elected to the post and his/her list (or the coalition) is awarded a majority of 23 seats in the Regional Council plus the seat of the President (24+1 seats with more than 45% of the vote). If no candidate gets more than 40% of the votes, a run-off is held fourteen days later, where the two top candidates from the first round run against each other. The winning candidate is then ensured a majority in the Regional Council.

== Council apportionment ==
According to the official 2011 Italian census, the 40 Council seats which must be covered by proportional representation are so distributed between Tuscan provinces. The number of seats to be assigned in each province is the following:

AR	FI	GR	LI	LU	MS	PI	PT	PO	SI
4	11	2	4	4	2	4	3	3	3

The Province of Florence is further divided into smaller electoral colleges.

== Parties and candidates ==
Political party or alliance	Constituent lists	Previous result		Candidate
Political party or alliance	Constituent lists	Votes (%)	Seats	Candidate
Centre-left coalition	Democratic Party (PD) (incl. DemoS)	45.9	24	Eugenio Giani
Centre-left coalition	Italia Viva – More Europe (IV – +E)	—	—	Eugenio Giani
Centre-left coalition	Civic Ecologist Left (incl. Art.1)	—	—	Eugenio Giani
Centre-left coalition	Proud Tuscany for Giani (incl. PSI, PRI, CD and IdV)	—	—	Eugenio Giani
Centre-left coalition	Green Europe (EV)	—	—	Eugenio Giani
Centre-left coalition	Svolta! (IiC – Volt – Tuscany in the Heart)	—	—	Eugenio Giani
Centre-right coalition	League (Lega)	16.0	4	Susanna Ceccardi
Centre-right coalition	Forza Italia (FI)	8.4	1	Susanna Ceccardi
Centre-right coalition	Brothers of Italy (FdI)	3.8	1	Susanna Ceccardi
Centre-right coalition	Civic Tuscany (incl. C! and FN)	—	—	Susanna Ceccardi
Five Star Movement (M5S)		15.0	4	Irene Galletti
Tuscany to the Left (incl. SI, PRC, PaP, SA, èViva)		6.3	1	Tommaso Fattori
Communist Party (PC)		—	—	Salvatore Catello
Italian Communist Party (PCI)		—	—	Marco Barzanti
3V Movement (M3V)		—	—	Tiziana Vigni

== Opinion polls ==
=== Candidates ===
Date	Polling firm/ Client	Sample size	Giani	Ceccardi	Galletti	Fattori	Catello	Others	Undecided	Lead
4 Sep 2020	Lab2101	–	41.7	43.1	8.4	—	—	6.8	—	1.4
28 Aug–3 Sep 2020	Quorum	2,000	42.0	38.0	8.0	6.0	—	6.0	—	4.0
29 Aug–2 Sep 2020	SWG	1,100	44.0	42.0	8.5	3.0	—	2.5	—	2.0
28 Aug–2 Sep 2020	Demetra (Note: This poll was commissioned by a political party.)	500	43.0	33.0	11.0	10.0	—	3.0	—	10.0
27–29 Aug 2020	EMG	1,000	44.0	41.5	8.0	—	—	5.5	—	2.5
27–28 Aug 2020	Scenari Politici–Winpoll	1,000	43.0	42.5	8.3	—	—	6.2	—	0.5
25 Aug 2020	Tecnè	2,000	43–47	39–43	5–9	—	—	5–9	—	0–8
24 Aug–2 Sep 2020	Noto	—	42–46	39–43	7–11	—	—	4–8	—	-1–7
30 Jun 2020	EMG	—	46.5	40.5	8.0	—	—	5.0	—	6.0
29–30 Jun 2020	Tecnè	1,000	46.0	40.5	8.0	—	—	5.5	17.6	5.5
28 Jun 2020	Demopolis	—	45.0	42.0	7.0	4.0	—	2.0	25.0	3.0
26 Jun 2020	Noto	1,000	46.0	40.0	8.0	—	—	6.0	—	6.0
29–31 May 2020	Noto	1,000	44.0	40.0	8.0	3.0	2.0	3.0	24.0	4.0
18–19 Feb 2020	EMG	1,000	50.0	40.0	5.5	—	3.0	1.5	—	10.0

==== Hypothetical candidates ====
Date	Polling firm/ Client	Sample size	Giani	Ceccardi	Other CDX	Galletti	Others	Undecided	Lead
19–23 Dec 2019	EMG	–	48.0	—	40.5 (Note: Antonfrancesco Vivarelli Colonna (Independent))	8.5	3.0	—	7.5
19–23 Dec 2019	EMG	–	48.0	40.0	—	9.0	3.0	—	8.0
19–23 Dec 2019	EMG	–	48.0	—	39.5 (Note: Giovanni Donzelli (FdI))	9.0	3.0	—	8.5
28 Nov–5 Dec 2019	SWG	1,000	44.0	44.0	—	7.0	5.0	17.0	Tie
28 Nov–5 Dec 2019	SWG	1,000	46.0	46.0	—	w. CSX	8.0	20.0	Tie

=== Parties ===
Date	Polling firm	Sample size	Centre-left				Centre-right				M5S	Others	Undecided	Lead
Date	Polling firm	Sample size	PD	IV	LS	Other	Lega	FI	FdI	Other	M5S	Others	Undecided	Lead
29 Aug–2 Sep 2020	SWG	2,000	33.5	4.0	—	5.0	28.0	5.5	9.0	0.5	9.0	5.5	—	5.5
28 Aug–3 Sep 2020	Quorum	2,000	31.9	5.8	—	6.6	23.2	3.8	10.8	1.8	8.5	7.6	—	7.7
27–29 Aug 2020	EMG	1,000	31.0	7.5	—	5.5	24.5	5.0	10.0	2.0	8.0	5.5	—	6.5
27–28 Aug 2020	Scenari Politici–Winpoll	1,000	22.6	5.7	7.6	5.7	24.1	5.4	11.8	2.5	8.3	6.3	—	1.5
24–29 Jun 2020	EMG	2,000	31.5	8.0	2.0	4.0	25.0	4.0	11.0	1.5	8.0	5.0	—	6.5
29–31 May 2020	Noto	1,000	33.0	6.0	1.5	4.5	24.0	4.0	11.5	3.0	5.0	7.5	26.0	9.0
18–19 Feb 2020	EMG	1,000	32.0	10.0	6.0		27.0	3.0	11.0	–	6.0	5.0	—	5.0
29 Dec 2019	EMG	–	30.0	7.0	4.0	4.0	27.0	6.0	8.0	–	10.0	12.0	—	3.0
28 Nov–5 Dec 2019	SWG	1,000	29.0	5.0	4.5	5.5	34.0	3.0	5.0	2.5	8.0	3.5	18.0	5.0
12–18 Jul 2018	Ipsos	800	28.5	—	3.9	2.3	29.5	8.4	4.0	0.2	21.0	2.2	—	1.0

== Results ==
20–21 September 2020 Tuscan regional election results
Candidates	Votes	%	Seats	Parties	Votes	%	Seats
Eugenio Giani	864,310	48.62	1	Democratic Party	563,116	34.69	22
Eugenio Giani	864,310	48.62	1	Italia Viva – More Europe	72,649	4.48	2
Eugenio Giani	864,310	48.62	1	Civic Ecologist Left	48,410	2.98	–
Eugenio Giani	864,310	48.62	1	Proud Tuscany for Giani	47,778	2.94	–
Eugenio Giani	864,310	48.62	1	Green Europe	26,924	1.66	–
Eugenio Giani	864,310	48.62	1	Svolta!	5,246	0.32	–
Eugenio Giani	864,310	48.62	1	Total	764,123	47.08	24
Susanna Ceccardi	719,266	40.46	2	League	353,514	21.78	7
Susanna Ceccardi	719,266	40.46	2	Brothers of Italy	219,165	13.50	4
Susanna Ceccardi	719,266	40.46	2	Forza Italia – UDC	69,456	4.28	1
Susanna Ceccardi	719,266	40.46	2	Civic Tuscany for Change	16,923	1.04	–
Susanna Ceccardi	719,266	40.46	2	Total	659,058	40.60	12
Irene Galletti	113,796	6.40	1	Five Star Movement	113,836	7.01	1
Tommaso Fattori	39,684	2.23	–	Tuscany to the Left	46,514	2.87	–
Salvatore Catello	17,007	0.96	–	Communist Party	17,032	1.05	–
Marco Barzanti	16,078	0.90	–	Italian Communist Party	15,617	0.96	–
Tiziana Vigni	7,668	0.43	–	3V Movement	6,974	0.43	–
Total candidates	1,777,809	100.00	4	Total parties	1,623,154	100.00	37
Source: Tuscany Region – Electoral Services

Popular vote – Parties
PD	34.69%
League	21.78%
FdI	13.50%
M5S	7.01%
IV	4.48%
FI	4.28%
SCE	2.98%
PT	2.94%
TaS	2.87%
Others	5.47%

Popular vote – President
Giani	48.62%
Ceccardi	40.46%
Galletti	6.40%
Fattori	2.23%
Others	2.29%

Regional Council – Seats summary
Centre-left	60.97%
Centre-right	34.15%
M5S	4.88%

=== Results by province and capital city ===
Province	Eugenio Giani	Susanna Ceccardi	Others
Florence	283,573 57.42%	155,492 31.48%	54,861 11.12%
Pisa	99,871 47.65%	86,800 41.42%	22,911 10.93%
Lucca	73,329 39.73%	93,003 50.39%	18,242 9.88%
Arezzo	72,810 44.41%	75,488 46.05%	15,634 9.53%
Livorno	71,294 46.18%	58,773 38.07%	24.313 15.75%
Pistoia	61,161 44.02%	63,703 45.85%	14,068 10.13%
Siena	67,365 52.60%	47,861 37.37%	12,851 10.04%
Prato	52,616 46.69%	48,514 43.05%	11,558 10.27%
Grosseto	43,200 42.04%	49,047 47.74%	10,491 10.22%
Massa-Carrara	39,091 43.92%	40,618 45.63%	9,304 10.45%
Total	864,310 48.62%	719,266 40.46%	194,233 10.92%

City	Eugenio Giani	Susanna Ceccardi	Others
Florence	109,025 60.30%	53,696 29.70%	18,083 10.00%
Prato	38,794 46.85%	35,538 42.92%	8,382 10.23%
Livorno	35,547 48.36%	24,009 32.67%	13,942 18.97%
Arezzo	20,595 42.02%	24,002 49.01%	4,397 8.97%
Pisa	23,046 52.66%	16,085 36.76%	4,631 10.58%
Pistoia	21,365 48.54%	18,214 41.38%	4,438 10.08%
Lucca	17,721 42.73%	19,735 47.58%	4,020 9.69%
Grosseto	16,171 42.39%	18,246 47.83%	3,728 9.44%
Massa	13,598 43.98%	13,890 44.93%	3,428 12.09%
Siena	14,007 51.40%	10,925 40.09%	2,321 8.51%

=== Turnout ===
Region	Time			
Region	20 Sep			21 Sep
Region	12:00	19:00	23:00	15:00
Tuscany	14.60%	36.29%	45.89%	62.60%
Province	Time			
Province	20 Sep			21 Sep
Province	12:00	19:00	23:00	15:00
Arezzo	13.63%	35.60%	45.50%	64.60%
Florence	16.60%	39.74%	49.96%	66.47%
Grosseto	14.41%	33.68%	41.87%	60.87%
Livorno	14.59%	32.87%	40.95%	57.33%
Lucca	12.39%	32.97%	41.34%	56.64%
Massa and Carrara	12.22%	30.98%	39.33%	54.91%
Pisa	15.27%	37.77%	48.65%	65.57%
Pistoia	13.90%	35.77%	45.75%	61.66%
Prato	15.61%	39.69%	49.79%	64.79%
Siena	13.98%	36.22%	46.53%	64.84%
Source: Tuscany Region – Turnout

== See also ==
- 2020 Italian regional elections
