= Eugenio Giani =

Italian politician (born 1959)

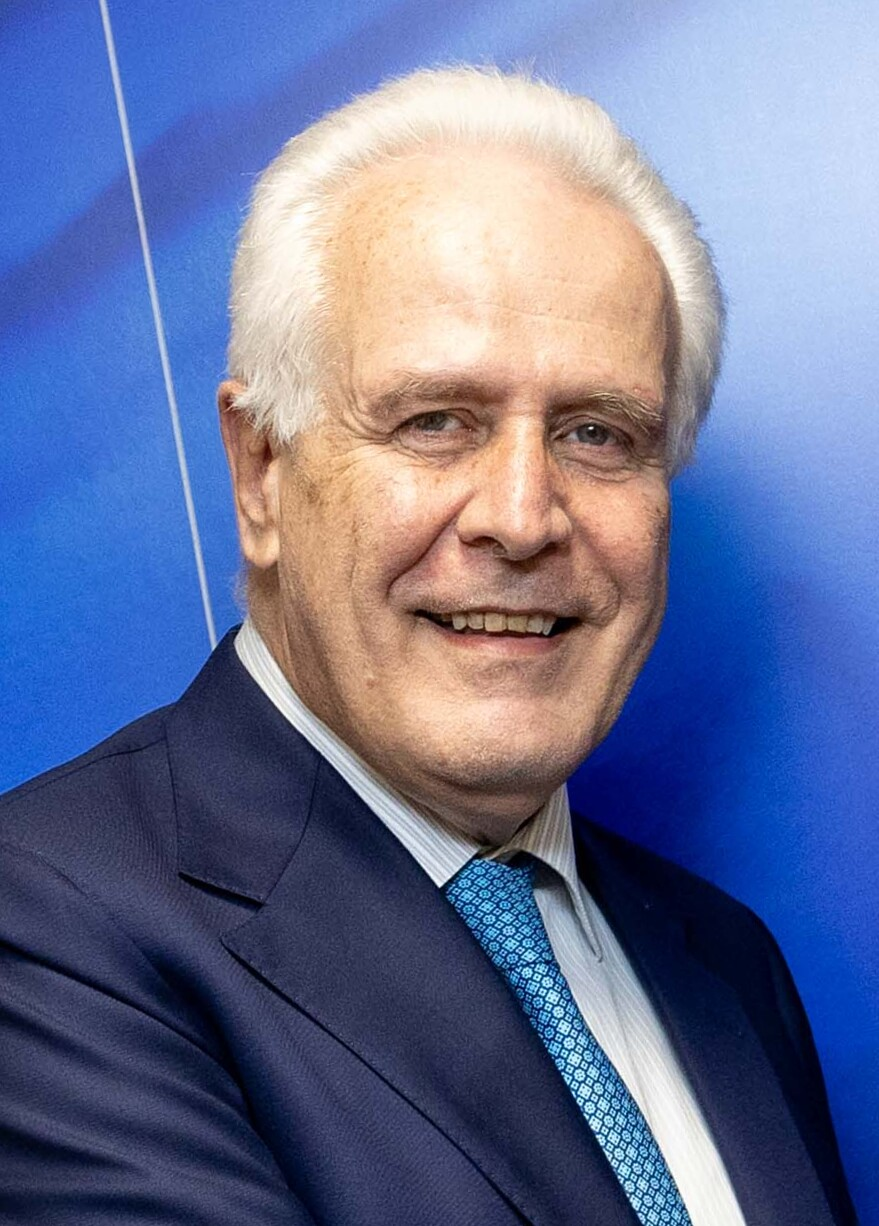

8th President of Tuscany
- Incumbent
- Assumed office 8 October 2020
- Preceded by: Enrico Rossi

President of the Regional Council of Tuscany
- In office 25 June 2015 – 8 October 2020
- Preceded by: Alberto Monaci
- Succeeded by: Antonio Mazzeo

President of the City Council of Florence
- In office 13 July 2009 – 28 May 2014
- Preceded by: Eros Cruccolini
- Succeeded by: Caterina Biti

Personal details
- Born: 30 June 1959 (age 67) Empoli, Italy
- Party: PSI (1990–1994); SI (1994–1998); SDI (1998–2007); PD (since 2009)
- Education: University of Florence
- Profession: Historian

Eugenio Giani (born 30 June 1959) is an Italian politician who is serving as the president of Tuscany since 8 October 2020.

== Biography ==
A member of the Democratic Party (PD), he started his political activity in the Italian Socialist Party (PSI) and he was active in the city council of Florence, of which he became president in 2009. He became a member of the PD the same year. In the 2015 Tuscan regional election, Giani obtained 10,505 personal preferences in the city of Florence; on 25 June 2015, he was elected president of the Regional Council of Tuscany.

=== President of Tuscany ===
As part of the centre-left coalition, Giani was elected the region's president in the 2020 Tuscan regional election, defeating 48% to 40% the League candidate Susanna Ceccardi, who represented the centre-right coalition. Giani became the oldest president-elect at the age of 61, and was officially sworn in as president on 8 October 2020. He was the centre-left coalition candidate in the 2025 Tuscan regional election, where he was re-elected to a second term.
