= Regional Council of Tuscany =

Legislative organ of Tuscany, Italy

Regional Council of Tuscany Consiglio Regionale della Toscana
- 12th Legislature

Type
- Type: Regional council Unicameral
- Established: 13 July 1970

Leadership
- President: Stefania Saccardi, IV since 10 November 2025

Structure
- Seats: 41
- Political groups: Government (25): PD (16); IV (4); AVS (3); M5S (2); Opposition (16): FdI (13); FI (2); FN (1)
- Length of term: 5 years

Elections
- Voting system: Party-list semi-proportional representation with majority bonus D'Hondt method
- Last election: 12–13 October 2025

Meeting place
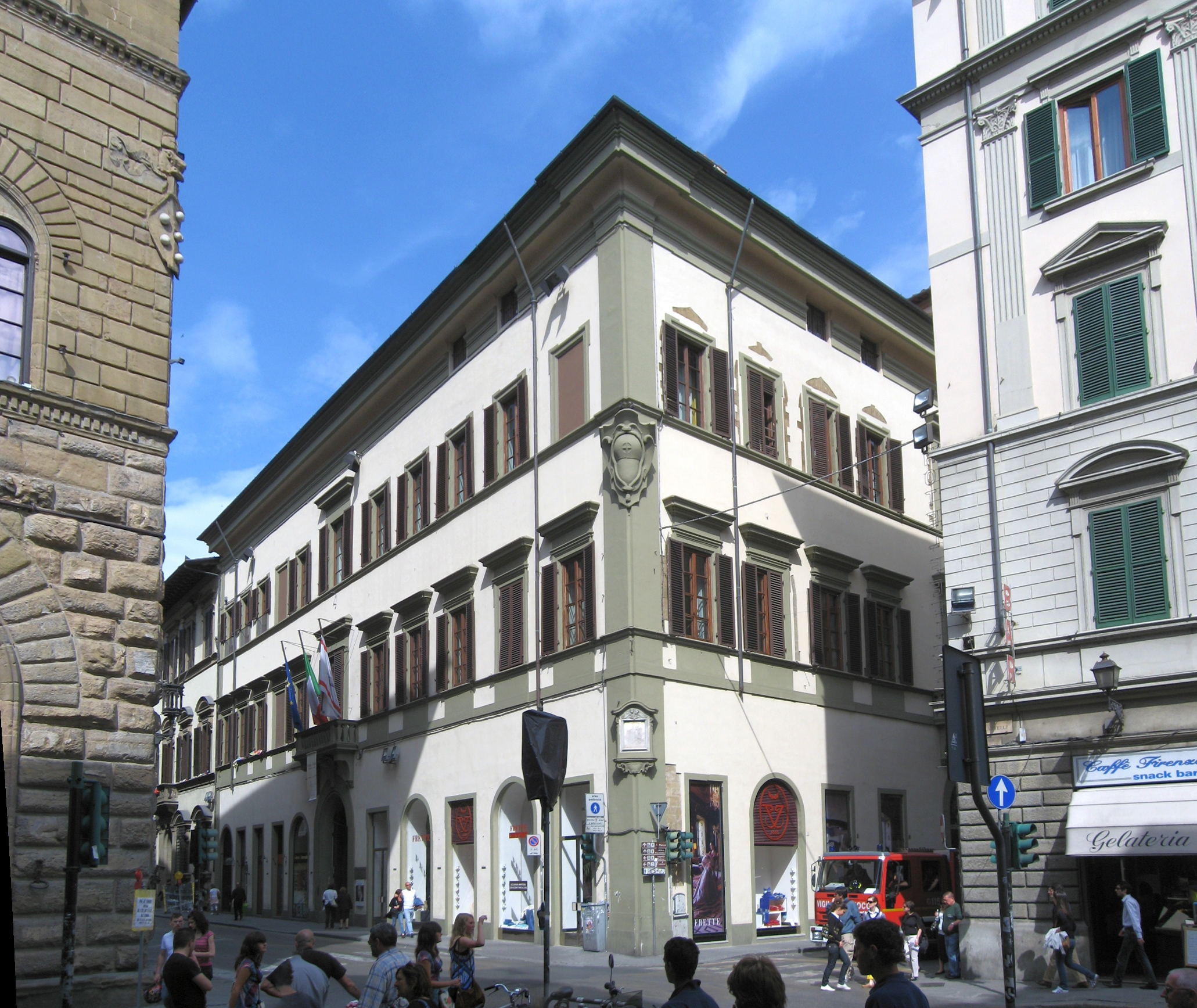
- Palazzo Panciatichi, Florence

Website
- Official website

The Regional Council of Tuscany (Italian: Consiglio Regionale della Toscana) is the legislative assembly of Tuscany. It was first elected in 1970, when the ordinary regions were instituted, on the basis of the Constitution of Italy of 1948.

== Composition ==
The Regional Council of Tuscany was originally composed of 50 regional councillors. In the 2005 regional election the number of councillors increased to 65, while in the 2010 regional election it was reduced to 53.

Following the 2014 regional electoral reform the number of regional councillors was reduced to 40, with an additional seat reserved for the President of the Region.

=== Political groups (2025–2030) ===
After the 2025 regional election, the Regional Council of Tuscany is currently composed of the following political groups:

Party	Seats	Status
Democratic Party (PD)	16 / 41	In government
Brothers of Italy (FdI)	13 / 41	In opposition
Italia Viva (IV)	4 / 41	In government
Greens and Left Alliance (AVS)	3 / 41	In government
Five Star Movement (M5S)	2 / 41	In government
Forza Italia (FI)	2 / 41	In opposition
National Future	1 / 41	In opposition

By coalition:

Coalition	Seats	Status
Centre-left coalition	25 / 41	Government
Centre-right coalition	16 / 41	Opposition

=== Historical composition ===
Election	PCI	PSI	DC	PLI	PRI	PSDI	MSI	Others	Total
7 June 1970	23	3	17	1	1	3	1	1	50
15 June 1975	25	4	15	-	1	2	2	1	50
8 June 1980	25	5	15	1	1	1	1	1	50
12 May 1985	25	5	14	-	1	1	2	1	50
6 May 1990	22	6	14	1	1	1	1	4	50

Election	Majority	Opposition	Council	President of the Region
23 April 1995	Centre-left (The Olive Tree) 33 / 50	Centre-right (Pole for Freedoms) 13 / 50 PRC 4 / 50		Vannino Chiti (1995–2000)
16 April 2000	Centre-left (The Olive Tree) 32 / 50	Centre-right (House of Freedoms) 16 / 50 PRC 2 / 50		Claudio Martini (2000–2010)
3 April 2005	Centre-left (The Union) 39 / 65	Centre-right (House of Freedoms) 21 / 65 PRC 5 / 65		Claudio Martini (2000–2010)
28 March 2010	Centre-left 32 / 53	Centre-right 19 / 53 UDC 2 / 53		Enrico Rossi (2010–2020)
31 May 2015	PD 25 / 41	FdI–LN 7 / 41 M5S 5 / 41 SEL 2 / 41 FI 2 / 41		Enrico Rossi (2010–2020)
20 September 2020	Centre-left 25 / 41	Centre-right 14 / 41 M5S 2 / 41		Eugenio Giani (since 2020)
12 October 2025	Centre-left 25 / 41	Centre-right 16 / 41		Eugenio Giani (since 2020)

== Presidents ==
This is a list of the Presidents of the Regional Council (Italian: Presidenti del Consiglio regionale):

Name	Period		Regional Legislature
Elio Gabbuggiani (PCI)	13 July 1970	21 July 1975	I (1970)
Loretta Montemaggi (PCI)	21 July 1975	21 July 1980	II (1975)
Loretta Montemaggi (PCI)	21 July 1980	25 October 1983	III (1980)
Giacomo Maccheroni (PSI)	25 October 1983	6 August 1985	III (1980)
Giacomo Maccheroni (PSI)	6 August 1985	26 May 1987	IV (1985)
Claudio Alvaro Carosi (PSDI)	26 May 1987	18 December 1987	IV (1985)
Enzo Pezzati (DC)	18 December 1987	28 June 1990	IV (1985)
Paolo Benelli (PSI)	28 June 1990	8 June 1993	V (1990)
Simone Siliani (PDS)	8 June 1993	7 June 1995	V (1990)
Angelo Passaleva (PPI)	7 June 1995	24 May 2000	VI (1995)
Riccardo Nencini (SDI/PSI)	24 May 2000	27 April 2005	VII (2000)
Riccardo Nencini (SDI/PSI)	27 April 2005	23 April 2010	VIII (2005)
Alberto Monaci (PD)	23 April 2010	25 June 2015	IX (2010)
Eugenio Giani (PD)	25 June 2015	8 October 2020 (Note: Elected President of the Region.)	X (2015)
Antonio Mazzeo (PD)	19 October 2020	10 November 2025	XI (2020)
Stefania Saccardi (IV)	10 November 2025	Incumbent	XII (2025)

== See also ==
- Regional council
- Politics of Tuscany
- President of Tuscany
- List of members of the Regional Council of Tuscany, 2020–2025
