= President of Tuscany =

- Flag of Tuscany
- Incumbent; Eugenio Giani since 8 October 2020
- Style: No title, courtesy or style
- Seat: Strozzi-Sacrati Palace
- Term length: 5 years, no term limits
- Inaugural holder: Lelio Lagorio
- Formation: 28 July 1970
- Website: Official website

The Governor of Tuscany is the supreme authority of Tuscany.

== Election ==
Originally appointed by the Regional Council of Tuscany, since 1995 de facto and 2000 de jure, he is elected by popular vote every five years under universal suffrage: the candidate who receives a plurality of votes, is elected.

His office is connected to the Regional Council, which is elected contextually: one fifth of the assembly seats are generally reserved to his supporters, which are wholesale elected concurrently with the governor. The council and the president are linked by an alleged relationship of confidence: if the president resigns or he is dismissed by the council, a snap election is called for both the legislative and the executive offices, because in no case the two bodies can be chosen separately.

The popular election of the president and the relationship of confidence between him and the legislature, allow to identify the Tuscan model of government as a particular form of semi-presidential system.

== Powers ==
The president of Tuscany promulgates regional laws and regulations. He can receive special administrative functions by the national government. The president is one of the forty-one members of the Regional Council and, in this capacity, he can propose new laws.

The president appoints and dismiss the Regional Cabinet (called Giunta Regionale in Italian). The Cabinet is composed by no more than eight regional assessors (assessori, literally "aldermen") who cannot be members of the Council at the same time. Assessors should not be confused with the ministers: according to Italian administrative law, assessors only receive delegations from the president to rule a bureau or an agency, the Region being a single legal person, not divided in ministries. One assessor is appointed vice president.

The Regional Cabinet prepares the budget, appoints the boards of public regional agencies and companies, manages assets, develops projects of governance, and resorts to the Constitutional Court of Italy if it thinks that a national law may violate regional powers. The president and the Cabinet are two different authorities of the Region: in matters within its competence, the Cabinet has the power to vote to give its approval.

== See also ==
- List of presidents of Tuscany
- Regional Council of Tuscany
