= List of members of the Regional Council of Tuscany, 1990–1995 =

The V Legislature of the Regional Council of Tuscany, the legislative assembly of Tuscany, was inaugurated following the 1990 regional election, held on 6–7 May 1990.

Paolo Benelli served as president of the regional council until 8 June 1993, when he was succeeded by Simone Siliani, who remained in office until the end of the legislature. Marco Marcucci (PCI, later PDS) served as president of Tuscany until January 1992, when he was succeeded by Vannino Chiti (PDS), who headed the regional government for the remainder of the legislature.

== Members ==
- Mariangela Arnavas
- Luigi Badiali
- Angelo Baracca
  - Tommaso Franci (since 8 March 1994)
- Tito Barbini
- Paolo Bartolozzi
- Gabriele Bellettini
- Alberto Bencistà
- Paolo Benelli
  - Laura Lodigiani (from 5 March 1994 to 21 April 1994, while Benelli was temporarily suspended)
- Paolo Benesperi
- Riccardo Bicchi
- Giuseppe Bicocchi
  - Giuseppe Del Carlo (since 11 January 1992)
- Romano Boretti
- Francesco Bosi
- Massimo Braccesi
- Silvano Calugi
- Oriano Cappelli
- Claudio Alvaro Carosi
- Gian Mario Carpi
  - Gabriello Mancini (since 16 July 1991)
- Vannino Chiti
- Vittorio Cioni
- Claudio Del Lungo
  - Rossano Ercolini (from 21 January 1991 to 19 November 1991, following the temporary annulment of Del Lungo's election)
- Patrizia Dini
- Fabrizio Franceschini
- Giovanni Fratini
- Angelo Fruzzetti
- Carlo Gattai
- Fabrizio Geloni
- Mauro Ginanneschi
- Paolo Giannarelli
- Giacomino Granchi
- Rinaldo Innaco
- Giorgio Kutufà
- Orietta Lunghi
- Alberto Magnolfi
  - Enno Ghiandelli (since 1 January 1992)
- Carlo Maltagliati
- Maria Grazia Mammuccini
- Marco Marcucci
- Riccardo Migliori
- Eliana Monarca
- Antonio Morettini
- Glauco Moscardini
- Angelo Passaleva
- Stefano Passigli
  - Carlo Lessona (since 4 March 1992)
  - Armando Calò (since 26 May 1992)
- Simonetta Pecini
- Moreno Periccioli
- Piero Pizzi
- Girolamo Presentini
- Simone Siliani
- Vincenzo Turini
- Michele Ventura

== Executive branch ==
The Regional Government (Giunta Regionale) was elected on 10 July 1990.

Member	Party	Delegate for
Marco Marcucci (president)	PCI	–
Alberto Magnolfi (vice president)	PSI	Healthcare
Luigi Badiali	PSI	Industry and manufacturing
Tito Barbini	PCI	Social welfare
Paolo Benesperi	PCI	EU policies, information systems and statistics
Riccardo Bicchi	PCI	Transports
Claudio Alvaro Carosi	PSDI	General affairs, budget and finance
Fabrizio Franceschini	PCI	Environment
Giovanni Fratini	PSI	Economy, tourism and sports
Paolo Giannarelli	PSI	Culture, education and university
Mauro Ginanneschi	PCI	Agriculture
Giacomino Granchi	PSI	Urban planning
Eliana Monarca	PCI	Labour

The Regional Government was re-elected on 11 January 1992 following its dissolution on 10 December 1991.

Member	Party	Delegate for
Vannino Chiti (president)	PDS	–
Giacomino Granchi (vice president)	PSI	Urban planning
Luigi Badiali	PSI	Industry and manufacturing
Tito Barbini	PDS	Social welfare
Alberto Bencistà	PDS	Agriculture
Paolo Benesperi	PDS	Transports
Claudio Alvaro Carosi	PSDI	Budget and finance
Giovanni Fratini	PSI	Healthcare
Carlo Gattai	PLI	Tourism and sports
Paolo Giannarelli	PSI	Culture, education and university
Eliana Monarca	PDS	Environment
Moreno Periccioli	PDS	General affairs and personnel

On 20 October 1992, Ennio Ghiandelli replaced Granchi as regional assessor, and Paolo Giannarelli became the vice president. The government resigned again on 8 June 1993 and was re-elected on 15 June 1993.

Member	Party	Delegate for
Vannino Chiti (president)	PDS	–
Giovanni Fratini (vice president)	PSI	Healthcare
Mariangela Arnavas	PDS	Social welfare
Luigi Badiali	PSI	Industry and manufacturing
Tito Barbini	PDS	Urban planning
Alberto Bencistà	PDS	Agriculture
Paolo Benesperi	PDS	Culture, education and university
Claudio Alvaro Carosi	PSDI	Budget, finance and environment
Carlo Gattai	PLI	Tourism and sports
Ennio Ghiandelli	PSI	Transports
Moreno Periccioli	PDS	Labour, general affairs and personnel

On 22 June 1993, Carosi was suspended from office. Patrizia Dini (PDS) joined the regional government with responsibility for budget and finance. Periccioli was assigned the environment portfolio, while Ghiandelli was assigned labour. On 25 January 1994, Badiali was suspended from office as regional minister and Carosi was reinstated, with responsibility for healthcare. Mauro Ginanneschi was also appointed, with responsibility for the economy, industry, and manufacturing. Fratini was assigned the budget and finance, general affairs, and personnel portfolios, while Dini was assigned labour. On 3 May 1994, Badiali was reinstated to the regional government with responsibility for European Union policies.
