= List of members of the Regional Council of Tuscany, 1980–1985 =

The III Legislature of the Regional Council of Tuscany, the legislative assembly of Tuscany, was inaugurated following the 1980 regional election, held on 8–9 June 1980.

The Regional Council was presided over by Loretta Montemaggi (PCI) until 25 October 1983, when she was succeeded by Giacomo Maccheroni (PSI). The Regional Government (Giunta regionale) was initially led by Mario Leone (PSI), who served as president of Tuscany until 31 May 1983, when he was replaced by Gianfranco Bartolini (PCI).

== Members ==
- Camillo Andreoni (until 14 January 1983, deceased)
  - Riccardo Migliori (since 18 January 1983)
- Piero Angelini (until 24 May 1983)
  - Filippo Luchi (since 24 May 1983)
- Fidia Arata
- Gianfranco Bartolini
- Giuliano Beneforti
- Paolo Benelli
- Bruno Benigni
- Mario Biasci
- Guido Biondi
- Luigi Berlinguer (until 24 May 1983)
  - Francesco Serafini (since 24 May 1983)
- Lina Bolzoni (until 11 January 1983)
  - Giovanni Scali (since 11 January 1983)
- Emo Bonifazi
- Gianmario Carpi
- Nello Di Paco
- Vera Dragoni
- Edda Fagni (until 7 June 1983)
  - Catalina Schezzini (since 7 June 1983)
- Franco Antonio Fanucchi (until 5 December 1984)
  - Ferdinando Soldati (since 5 December 1984)
- Lino Federigi
- Rino Fioravanti
- Piergiorgio Franci
- Menotti Galeotti
- Rinaldo Innaco
- Mario Leone (until 24 May 1983)
  - Celso Banchelli (since 24 May 1983)
- Giacomo Maccheroni
- Marco Mayer
- Sergio Manetti
- Fausto Marchetti
- Marco Marcucci
- Sergio Martelli
- Giuseppe Matulli
- Cesare Matteini
- Delia Meiattini
- Anselmo Menchetti
- Loretta Montemaggi
- Raffaello Morelli
- Andrea Negrari
- Giancarlo Niccolai
- Graziano Palandri
- Stefano Passigli
- Enzo Pezzati
- Piero Pizzi
- Renato Pollini (until 24 May 1983)
  - Ermanno Benocci (since 24 May 1983)
- Francesco Alessandro Querci
- Giulio Quercini
- Pietro Ralli
- Dino Raugi
- Mauro Arturo Ribelli
- Luigi Tassinari
- Roberto Teroni
- Giorgio Vestri

== Executive branch ==
The Regional Government (Giunta Regionale) was elected on 29 July 1980.

Member	Party	Delegate for
Mario Leone (president)	PSI	–
Gianfranco Bartolini (vice president)	PCI	Industry and tourism
Fidia Arata	PCI	Trade and manufacturing
Emo Bonifazi	PCI	Agriculture and land reclamation
Lino Federigi	PCI	General and institutional affairs, personnel, statistics, data processing
Giacomo Maccheroni	PSI	Urban planning and public housing
Dino Raugi	PCI	Public works and transports
Renato Pollini	PCI	Budget and finance
Luigi Tassinari	PCI	Culture, education and sports
Giorgio Vestri	PCI	Healthcare and social welfare

Following the resignation of Pollini, Tassinari, and Raugi, the executive underwent a reshuffle, and a new government was sworn in on 18 May 1982.

Member	Party	Delegate for
Mario Leone (president)	PSI	–
Gianfranco Bartolini (vice president)	PCI	Planning, energy policy, institutional and legal affairs
Edda Fagni	PCI	General affairs, personnel, statistics, and data processing
Fidia Arata	PCI	Trade and sports
Emo Bonifazi	PCI	Agriculture and land reclamation
Lino Federigi	PCI	Soil and environmental protection, public works, social housing, and transports
Menotti Galeotti	PCI	Budget and finance
Giacomo Maccheroni	PSI	Urban planning and public housing
Marco Mayer	PCI	Education, culture and information
Anselmo Menchetti	PSI	Industry, manufacturing and tourism
Giorgio Vestri	PCI	Healthcare and social welfare

Following the resignation of Leone as president and the election of Bartolini, a new reshuffle took place on 31 May 1983. Maccheroni and Menchetti left the government, while Giuliano Beneforti (PCI) and Delia Meiattini (PCI) joined it. The final executive sworn in on 11 October 1983.

Member	Party	Delegate for
Gianfranco Bartolini (president)	PCI	
Giuliano Beneforti	PCI	
Bruno Benigni	PCI	
Guido Biondi	PSIUP	
Emo Bonifazi	PCI	
Lino Federigi	PCI	
Menotti Galeotti	PCI	
Marco Mayer	PCI	
Delia Meiattini	PCI	
Roberto Teroni	PDUP	
Giorgio Vestri	PCI	
