= List of members of the Regional Council of Tuscany, 1985–1990 =

The IV Legislature of the Regional Council of Tuscany, the legislative assembly of Tuscany, was inaugurated following the 1985 regional election, held on 12–13 May 1985.

The Regional Council elected three different presidents during its term. Giacomo Maccheroni (PSI) served as president of the council from 6 August 1985 until 26 May 1987, when he was succeeded by Claudio Alvaro Carosi (PSDI), who held office until 18 December 1987. Enzo Pezzati (DC) was then elected president of the council and remained in office until the end of the legislature on 28 June 1990.

Throughout the legislature, the Regional Government (Giunta regionale) was led by Gianfranco Bartolini of the PCI, who served as president of Tuscany.

== Members ==
- Mariangela Arnavas
- Angelo Baracca
- Gianfranco Bartolini
- Giuliano Beneforti
- Paolo Benelli
- Bruno Benigni
- Silvano Bernardini
- Mario Biasci (until 14 May 1987)
  - Vincenzo Turini (since 14 May 1987)
- Giuseppe Bicocchi
- Emo Bonifazi (until 26 May 1987)
  - Piero Pii (since 26 May 1987)
- Romano Boretti
- Anna Maria Bucciarelli
- Silvano Calugi
- Franco Camarlinghi
- Claudio Alvaro Carosi
- Gianmario Carpi
- Vannino Chiti
- Francesco Colucci
- Enrico Falqui (until 28 November 1989)
  - Roberto Smeraldi (since 28 November 1989)
- Maria Teresa Fé
- Fabrizio Franceschini
- Piergiorgio Franci
- Menotti Galeotti (until 14 May 1987)
  - Maria Grazia Mammuccini (since 14 May 1987)
- Fabrizio Geloni
- Grazia Gimmelli
- Mauro Ginanneschi
- Rinaldo Innaco
- Giorgio Kutufà
- Goffredo Landini
- Giacomo Maccheroni (until 14 May 1987)
  - Luisella Aliberti (since 14 May 1987)
- Alberto Magnolfi
- Sergio Manetti
- Marco Marcucci
- Giuseppe Matulli (until 14 May 1987)
  - Paolo Bartolozzi (since 14 May 1987)
- Marco Mayer
- Anselmo Menchetti (until 14 May 1987)
  - Luigi Badiali (since 14 May 1987)
- Riccardo Migliori
- Glauco Moscardini
- Alì Nannipieri
- Mino Nelli
- Giancarlo Niccolai
- Stefano Passigli
- Enzo Pezzati
- Piero Pizzi
- Emilio Pucciarelli
- Giulio Quercini (until 14 May 1987)
  - Riccardo Bicchi (since 14 May 1987)
- Pietro Ralli
- Danilo Ravenni
- Francesco Serafini
- Roberto Teroni

== Executive branch ==
The Regional Government (Giunta Regionale) was elected on 13 August 1985.

Member	Party	Delegate for
Gianfranco Bartolini (president)	PCI	–
Paolo Benelli (vice president)	PSI	Budget and finance
Bruno Benigni	PCI	Social welfare
Giuliano Beneforti	PCI	Urban planning
Emo Bonifazi	PCI	Agriculture
Franco Camarlinghi	PCI	Culture, education and universities
Claudio Alvaro Carosi	PSDI	Industry, labour, information systems
Francesco Colucci	PSI	Tourism and sports
Alberto Magnolfi	PSI	Social housing and transports
Marco Marcucci	PCI	Environment and civil protection
Marco Mayer	PCI	Economy, trade and manufacturing
Anselmo Menchetti	PSI	Healthcare
Alì Nannipieri	PCI	General affairs and personnel, institutional and legal affairs

On 17 June 1986, Beneforti was replaced by Mauro Ginanneschi (PCI). On 17 March 1987, Camarlinghi resigned and his responsibilities were temporarily assumed by president Bartolini. On 11 May 1987, following the resignation of Menchetti, the healthcare portfolio was reassigned to Magnolfi. Following the resignation of Bonifazi, a reshuffle took place on 26 May 1987, with the appointment of three new regional assessors.

Member	Party	Delegate for
Gianfranco Bartolini (president)	PCI	Budget and finance
Paolo Benelli (vice president)	PSI	Healthcare
Luigi Badiali	PSI	Housing, labour and industry
Bruno Benigni	PCI	Social welfare
Francesco Bucciarelli	PCI	Culture, education and universities
Francesco Colucci	PSI	Tourism, sports, statistics, data processing systems
Mauro Ginanneschi	PCI	Urban planning
Alberto Magnolfi	PSI	Social housing and transports
Marco Marcucci	PCI	Environment and civil protection
Marco Mayer	PCI	Trade and manufacturing
Alì Nannipieri	PCI	General affairs and personnel, institutional and legal affairs
Francesco Serafini	PCI	Agriculture

On 8 July 1987, following the resignation of Colucci after the issuance of an arrest warrant on charges of corruption, his responsibilities were temporarily assumed by president Bartolini and were later assigned to the new regional assessor Luisella Aliberti (PSI) on 21 July 1987. On 18 December 1987, Carosi re-entered the executive, taking over the portfolios of budget and finance. On 4 October 1988, assessors Mayer and Nannipieri were replaced by Silvano Calugi (PCI) and Grazia Gimmelli (PCI).
