= List of members of the Regional Council of Tuscany, 1975–1980 =

The II Legislature of the Regional Council of Tuscany, the legislative assembly of Tuscany, was inaugurated following the 1975 regional election, held on 15–16 June 1975.

The Regional Council was chaired throughout the legislative term by Loretta Montemaggi of the PCI. The Regional Government was initially led by Lelio Lagorio (PSI) until 26 September 1978, when he was succeeded by Mario Leone (PSI), who served for the remainder of the legislative term.

== Members ==
- Camillo Andreoni
- Piero Angelini
- Giordano Angiolini
- Fidia Arata
- Nello Balestracci (until 17 April 1979)
  - Liliano Mandorli (since 17 April 1979)
- Giovanni Barbagli
- Gianfranco Bartolini
- Roberto Barzanti (until 14 September 1979)
  - Luigi Franceschelli (since 14 September 1979)
- Giulio Battistini
- Luigi Berlinguer
- Silvano Bernardini
- Guido Biondi
- Tommaso Bisagno (until 17 April 1979)
  - Giuseppe Matulli (since 17 April 1979)
- Ivo Butini (until 17 April 1979)
  - Rinaldo Innaco (since 17 April 1979)
- Leno Carmignoli
- Alberto Cecchi (until 18 May 1976)
  - Marco Mayer (since 18 May 1976)
- Nello Di Paco
- Vera Dragoni
- Lino Federigi
- Piergiorgio Franci
- Elio Gabbuggiani (until 28 July 1975)
  - Rino Fioravanti (since 28 July 1975)
- Doriano Giampaoli
- Rodolfo Giovannelli
- Mario Guidi
- Lelio Lagorio (until 17 April 1979)
  - Celso Banchelli (since 17 April 1979)
- Mario Leone
- Luciano Lusvardi
- Giacomo Maccheroni
- Walter Malvezzi
- Carlo Mariani
- Fausto Marchetti
- Pietro Mazzocca
- Leonetto Melani
- Loretta Montemaggi
- Graziano Palandri
- Alessio Pasquini (until 17 April 1979)
  - Menotti Galeotti (since 17 April 1979)
- Stefano Passigli
- Enzo Pezzati
- Renato Pollini
- Anselmo Pucci
- Francesco Alessandro Querci
- Pietro Ralli
- Bino Raugi
- Mauro Arturo Ribelli
- Ilario Rosati (until 4 July 1978)
  - Delia Meiattini (since 4 July 1978)
- Ferdinando Soldati
- Luciano Stanghellini (until 31 October 1978)
  - Marco Brachi (since 31 October 1978)
- Luigi Tassinari
- Giorgio Vestri
- Wanda Wanderlingh

== Executive branch ==
The Regional Government (Giunta Regionale) was elected on 28 July 1975.

Member	Party	Delegate for
Lelio Lagorio (president)	PSI	–
Gianfranco Bartolini (vice president)	PCI	Budget
Roberto Barzanti	PCI	General affairs and personnel
Lino Federigi	PCI	Labour
Mario Leone	PSI	Trade, industry, manufacturing and tourism
Giacomo Maccheroni	PSI	Urban planning and social housing
Renato Pollini	PCI	Finance
Anselmo Pucci	PCI	Agriculture
Dino Raugi	PCI	Public works and transports
Luigi Tassinari	PCI	Culture, education and sports
Giorgio Vestri	PCI	Healthcare and social welfare

Following the new powers devolved to the Regions by Presidential Decree No. 616/1977, the regional executive underwent a redistribution of portfolios on 1 December 1977.

Member	Party	Delegate for
Lelio Lagorio (president)	PSI	Coordination, territorial planning, information and broadcasting affairs
Gianfranco Bartolini (vice president)	PCI	Economy
Roberto Barzanti	PCI	General affairs and personnel, legal and institutional affairs
Lino Federigi	PCI	Environment, public works and social housing
Mario Leone	PSI	Labour, industry, trade, manufacturing and tourism
Giacomo Maccheroni	PSI	Urban planning and housing policy
Renato Pollini	PCI	Finance and annual budget, statistics, data processing
Anselmo Pucci	PCI	Agriculture
Dino Raugi	PCI	Transports
Luigi Tassinari	PCI	Culture, education and sports
Giorgio Vestri	PCI	Healthcare and social welfare

Following the resignation of Lagorio as president, after being appointed to a position within the National Directorate of the PSI, Leone was elected as his successor. The new regional executive was sworn in on 26 September 1978.

Member	Party	Delegate for
Mario Leone (president)	PSI	Coordination, information and broadcasting affairs, employment policies
Gianfranco Bartolini (vice president)	PCI	Economy
Fidia Arata	PSI	Industry, trade, manufacturing and tourism
Roberto Barzanti	PCI	General affairs and personnel, legal and institutional affairs
Lino Federigi	PCI	Environment, public works, social housing
Giacomo Maccheroni	PSI	Urban planning and housing policy
Renato Pollini (secretary)	PCI	Budget and finance, statistics and data processing
Anselmo Pucci	PCI	Agriculture
Dino Raugi	PCI	Transports
Luigi Tassinari	PCI	Culture, education and sports
Giorgio Vestri	PCI	Healthcare and social welfare

On 14 September 1979, Barzanti was replaced by Guido Biondi (PSIUP).

== Sources ==
- Baccetti, Carlo (June 2005). "Le prime elezioni regionali in Toscana (1970 e 1975): formazione e tipologia di un nuovo ceto politico". Quaderni dell'Osservatorio Elettorale – Italian Journal of Electoral Studies. 53 (1): 5–62. doi:10.36253/qoe-12722.
