= List of members of the Regional Council of Tuscany, 1995–2000 =

The VI Legislature of the Regional Council of Tuscany, the legislative assembly of Tuscany, was inaugurated on 7 June 1995, following the 1995 regional election.

Angelo Passaleva (Italian People's Party) served as the president of the council, while Vannino Chiti (Democratic Party of the Left) served as president of Tuscany at the head of his second regional government.

== Members ==
- Mario Baglini
- Tito Barbini
- Paolo Bartolozzi
- Massimo Bellandi
- Alberto Bencistà
- Paolo Benesperi
- Maria Pia Bertolucci
- Maurizio Bianconi
- Siro Bussolotti
- Vincenzo Caciulli
- Franco Cazzola
- Enrico Cecchetti
- Vannino Chiti (president of Tuscany)
- Vittorio Cioni
- Giuseppe Del Carlo
- Claudio Del Lungo
- Patrizia Dini
- Paolo Fontanelli (until 21 December 1998, elected mayor of Pisa)
  - Corrado Rossi (since 21 December 1998)
- Tommaso Franci
- Nino Frosini
- Angelo Fruzzetti
- Fabrizio Geloni
- Olivo Ghilarducci
- Paolo Giannarelli
- Mauro Ginanneschi
- Pedro Losi
- Orietta Lunghi
- Virgilio Luvisotti
- Massimo Malanima
- Marialina Marcucci
- Claudio Martini
- Francesco Martini
- Carlo Melani
- Luis Micheli Clavier
- Riccardo Migliori (until 7 May 1996, elected to the Chamber of Deputies)
  - Enrico Bosi (since 7 May 1996)
- Marisa Nicchi
- Angelo Passaleva (president of the regional council)
- Simonetta Pecini
- Moreno Periccioli
- Leopoldo Provenzali
- Roberto Pucci
- Claudio Riccardi
- Varis Rossi
- Guido Sacconi (until 21 September 1999, elected to the European Parliament)
  - Carlo Vannini (since 21 September 1999)
- Simone Siliani
- Iole Vannucci
- Michele Ventura (until 14 December 1999, elected to the Chamber of Deputies)
  - Antonio Morettini (since 14 December 1999)
- Denis Verdini
- Lorenzo Zirri
- Maria Concetta Zoppi

== Executive branch ==
The Regional Government (Giunta Regionale) was sworn in on 13 June 1995.

Member	Party	Delegate for
Vannino Chiti (president)	PDS	–
Marialina Marcucci (vice president)	AD	
Tito Barbini	PDS	
Paolo Benesperi	PDS	
Franco Cazzola	PDS	
Claudio Del Lungo	FdV	
Paolo Fontanelli	PDS	
Fabrizio Geloni	PPI	
Paolo Giannarelli	FL	
Claudio Martini	PDS	
Moreno Periccioli	PDS	
Simone Siliani	PDS	
Michele Ventura	PDS	

On 10 November 1998, Mauro Ginanneschi replaced Fontanelli as regional assessor.

== See also ==
- List of members of the Regional Council of Tuscany, 2000–2005
