= List of presidents of Tuscany =

This is the list of presidents of Tuscany since 1970. The presidents of the regional administration were, from 1970 to 1995, elected by the Regional Council. Since the 1995 reform law, the president of the Tuscany Region is an elective office.

== List ==
President		Term of office		Party	Administration	Administration coalition	Legislature
President		Duration in years, months and days		Party	Administration	Administration coalition	Legislature
1	Lelio Lagorio (1925–2017)	28 July 1970	26 September 1978	PSI	Lagorio I	PCI • PSI • PSIUP	I (1970)
1	Lelio Lagorio (1925–2017)	28 July 1970	26 September 1978	PSI	Lagorio II	PCI • PSI	II (1975)
1	Lelio Lagorio (1925–2017)	8 years, 1 month and 30 days		PSI	Lagorio II	PCI • PSI	II (1975)
2	Mario Leone (1922–2013)	26 September 1978	31 May 1983	PSI	Leone I	PCI • PSI	II (1975)
2	Mario Leone (1922–2013)	26 September 1978	31 May 1983	PSI	Leone II	PCI • PSI	III (1980)
2	Mario Leone (1922–2013)	4 years, 8 months and 6 days		PSI	Leone II	PCI • PSI	III (1980)
3	Gianfranco Bartolini (1927–1992)	31 May 1983	10 July 1990	PCI	Bartolini I	PCI • PDUP	III (1980)
3	Gianfranco Bartolini (1927–1992)	31 May 1983	10 July 1990	PCI	Bartolini II	PCI • PSI • PSDI	IV (1985)
3	Gianfranco Bartolini (1927–1992)	7 years, 1 month and 11 days		PCI	Bartolini II	PCI • PSI • PSDI	IV (1985)
4	Marco Marcucci (Born 1949)	10 July 1990	11 January 1992	PCI; PDS	Marcucci	PCI • PSI • PSDI	V (1990)
4	Marco Marcucci (Born 1949)	1 year, 6 months and 2 days		PCI; PDS	Marcucci	PCI • PSI • PSDI	V (1990)
5	Vannino Chiti (Born 1947)	11 January 1992	18 May 2000	PDS; DS	Chiti I	PDS • PSI • PSDI • PLI	V (1990)
5	Vannino Chiti (Born 1947)	11 January 1992	18 May 2000	PDS; DS	Chiti II	Democratic Tuscany (PDS • PPI • FdV • FL)	VI (1995)
5	Vannino Chiti (Born 1947)	8 years, 4 months and 8 days		PDS; DS	Chiti II	Democratic Tuscany (PDS • PPI • FdV • FL)	VI (1995)
6	Claudio Martini (Born 1951)	18 May 2000	16 April 2010	DS; PD	Martini I	Democratic Tuscany (DS • PPI • Dem • PdCI • FdV • SDI)	VII (2000)
6	Claudio Martini (Born 1951)	18 May 2000	16 April 2010	DS; PD	Martini II	Democratic Tuscany (DS • DL • PdCI • FdV)	VIII (2005)
6	Claudio Martini (Born 1951)	9 years, 10 months and 30 days		DS; PD	Martini II	Democratic Tuscany (DS • DL • PdCI • FdV)	VIII (2005)
7	Enrico Rossi (Born 1958)	16 April 2010	8 October 2020	PD	Rossi I	Democratic Tuscany (PD • IdV • FdS • FdV)	IX (2010)
7	Enrico Rossi (Born 1958)	16 April 2010	8 October 2020	PD	Rossi II	PD	X (2015)
7	Enrico Rossi (Born 1958)	10 years, 5 months and 23 days		PD	Rossi II	PD	X (2015)
8	Eugenio Giani (Born 1959)	8 October 2020	Incumbent	PD	Giani I	PD • IV	XI (2020)
8	Eugenio Giani (Born 1959)	8 October 2020	Incumbent	PD	Giani II	PD • IV • AVS • M5S	XII (2025)
8	Eugenio Giani (Born 1959)	5 years, 8 months and 25 days		PD	Giani II	PD • IV • AVS • M5S	XII (2025)

== Vice presidents ==
The vice president of Tuscany is the second-highest official in the regional executive government of Tuscany and serves as the deputy to the president of the Region. The office has existed since 1970, although the position was not formally recognized as a member of the executive until 1995. The vice president is appointed by the president of Tuscany and may be dismissed at any time. Here is a list of vice presidents of Tuscany:

	Vice president	Term start	Term end	Party	Government
1	Walter Malvezzi	28 July 1970	28 July 1975	PCI	Legorio I
2	Gianfranco Bartolini	28 July 1975	27 September 1978	PCI	Lagorio II
2	Gianfranco Bartolini	27 September 1978	29 July 1980	PCI	Leone I
2	Gianfranco Bartolini	29 July 1980	31 May 1983	PCI	Leone II
–	Vacant office (1983–1985)				Bartolini I
3	Paolo Benelli	6 August 1985	10 July 1990	PSI	Bartolini II
4	Alberto Magnolfi	10 July 1990	11 January 1992	PSI	Marcucci
5	Giacomino Granchi	11 January 1992	20 October 1992	PSI	Chiti I
6	Paolo Giannarelli	20 October 1992	15 June 1993	PSI	Chiti I
7	Giovanni Fratini	15 June 1993	13 June 1995	PSI	Chiti I
8	Marialina Marcucci	13 June 1995	17 April 2000	AD	Chiti II
9	Angelo Passaleva	20 May 2000	5 April 2005	PPI	Martini I
10	Federico Gelli	6 May 2005	16 April 2010	PD	Martini II
11	Stella Targetti	27 April 2010	16 February 2014	PD	Rossi I
12	Stefania Saccardi	17 February 2014	31 May 2015	PD	Rossi I
13	Monica Barni	30 July 2015	22 September 2020	PD	Rossi II
(12)	Stefania Saccardi	22 October 2020	10 November 2025	IV	Giani I
14	Mia Diop	10 November 2025	Incumbent	PD	Giani II
