= 1995 Italian regional elections =

- 23 April 1995

Presidents and regional assemblies of Piedmont, Lombardy, Veneto, Liguria, Emilia-Romagna, Tuscany, Marche, Umbria, Lazio, Campania, Molise, Abruzzo, Apulia, Basilicata and Calabria
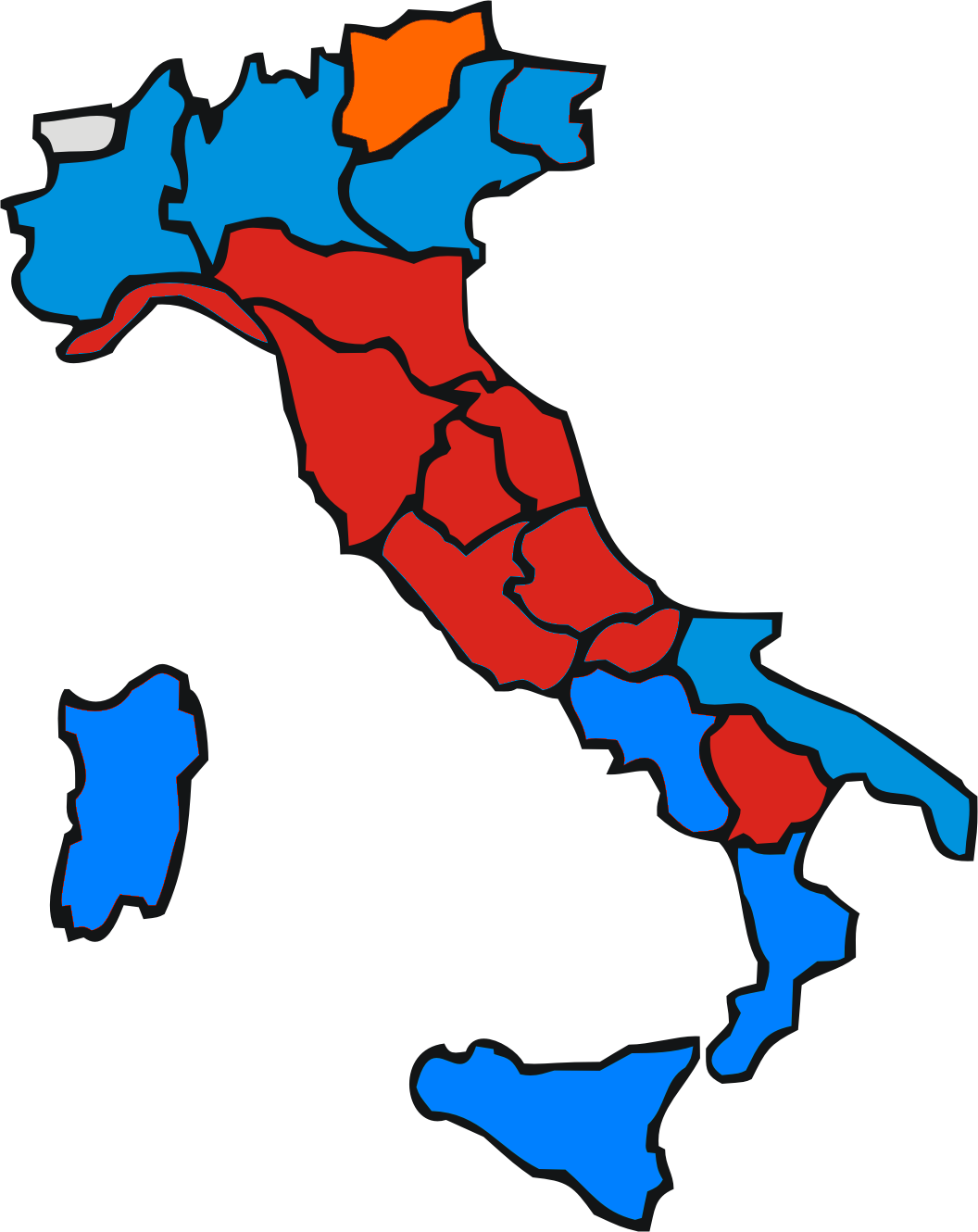
- Elected Presidents: Centre-right coalition Centre-left coalition

The Italian regional elections of 1995 were held on 23 April. These regional elections were the first to be held under the provisions of the new electoral system.

The centre-left coalition won the majority of votes in nine regions, while the centre-right coalition secured victory in only six regions.

== New electoral law ==
A new electoral law for the ordinary Regions of Italy was adopted in February 1995, replacing the original 1970 law, with the aim of abolishing proportional representation (PR) and reducing the resulting political instability. Although 80% of seats continued to be allocated under the old PR system through provincial lists, under the new system 20% of seats were now assigned at large through block voting to the most voted coalition of parties. Formally, direct presidential elections were postponed until 2000, pending a constitutional reform. However, the leaders of the winning coalitions in the elections effectively became regional presidents.

== Coalitions ==
After the fall of the Berlusconi I Cabinet and the collapse of the Pole of Freedoms, the Northern League ran as a single party, while a new national centre-right coalition was formed between Silvio Berlusconi's Forza Italia and the post-fascist National Alliance. The Christian-left Italian People's Party, on the other hand, joined the new centre-left coalition, The Olive Tree, which was consequently abandoned in protest by the far-left Communist Refoundation Party.

== Overall results ==
=== Regional councils ===
Alliance	Votes	%	Seats
Centre-left coalition (The Olive Tree)	11,392,677	43.28	349 / 755
Centre-right coalition (Pole for Freedoms)	10,821,365	41.11	345 / 755
Others	4,110,724	15,61	61 / 755
Total	26,324,766	100.00	755 / 755
Source: Ministry of the Interior

=== Presidents of the regions ===
Region	Outgoing		Elected			Election
Region	President	Party	President	Party	Alliance	Election
Piedmont	Gian Paolo Brizio	PPI	Enzo Ghigo	FI	Centre-right	Details
Liguria	Giancarlo Mori	PPI	Giancarlo Mori	PPI	Centre-left	Details
Lombardy	Paolo Arrigoni	LN	Roberto Formigoni	FI	Centre-right	Details
Veneto	Aldo Bottin	PPI	Giancarlo Galan	FI	Centre-right	Details
Emilia-Romagna	Pier Luigi Bersani	PDS	Pier Luigi Bersani	PDS	Centre-left	Details
Tuscany	Vannino Chiti	PDS	Vannino Chiti	PDS	Centre-left	Details
Umbria	Claudio Carnieri	PDS	Bruno Bracalente	PDS	Centre-left	Details
Marche	Gaetano Recchi	PSI	Vito D'Ambrosio	PDS	Centre-left	Details
Lazio	Arturo Osio	FdV	Piero Badaloni	Ind	Centre-left	Details
Abruzzo	Vincenzo Del Colle	PPI	Antonio Falconio	PPI	Centre-left	Details
Molise	Giovanni Di Giandomenico	PPI	Marcello Veneziale	PDS	Centre-left	Details
Campania	Giovanni Grasso	PPI	Antonio Rastrelli	AN	Centre-right	Details
Basilicata	Antonio Boccia	PPI	Angelo Raffaele Dinardo	PPI	Centre-left	Details
Apulia	Giuseppe Martellotta	PPI	Salvatore Distaso	FI	Centre-right	Details
Calabria	Donato Veraldi	PPI	Giuseppe Nisticò	FI	Centre-right	Details

== Summary by region ==
=== Piedmont ===
President				Regional council			
Candidate	Party	Votes	%	Alliance	Votes	%	Seats
Enzo Ghigo	FI	1,059,602	39.7	Centre-right	900,373	40.9	33
Giuseppe Pichetto	Ind	938,280	35.2	Centre-left	794,778	36.1	18
Domenico Comino	LN	296,966	11.1	LN	217,194	9.9	5
Giovanni Alasia	PRC	248,158	9.3	PRC	203,842	9.2	4
Others		125,870	4.7	Others	86,103	3.9	0
Voters: 3,056,187 — Turnout: 83.0%

=== Lombardy ===
President				Regional council			
Candidate	Party	Votes	%	Alliance	Votes	%	Seats
Roberto Formigoni	FI	2,386,732	41.07	Centre-right	2,077,221	41.7	54
Diego Masi	PS	1,591,417	27.4	Centre-left	1,473,339	29.6	19
Francesco Speroni	LN	1,087,128	18.7	LN	879,139	17.7	12
Giuseppe Torri	PRC	459,051	7.9	PRC	381,221	7.7	5
Others		286,503	4.9	Others	167,649	3.4	0
Voters: 6,323,049 — Turnout: 84.2%

=== Veneto ===
President				Regional council			
Candidate	Party	Votes	%	Alliance	Votes	%	Seats
Giancarlo Galan	FI	1,117,377	38.2	Centre-right	969,097	38.3	36
Ettore Bentsik	Ind	945,753	32.3	Centre-left	911,842	36.0	18
Alberto Lembo	LN	512,578	17.5	LN	422,410	16.7	9
Paolo Cacciari	PRC	200,649	6.9	PRC	126,594	5.0	2
Others		149,214	5.1	Others	102,596	4.0	0
Voters: 3,212,545 — Turnout: 85.2%

=== Liguria ===
President				Regional council			
Candidate	Party	Votes	%	Alliance	Votes	%	Seats
Giancarlo Mori	PPI	445,340	42.4	Centre-left	422,072	44.0	27
Sergio Magliola	Ind	399,405	38.0	Centre-right	367,155	38.2	14
Giuseppe Tarantino	PRC	90,550	8.6	PRC	76,507	8.0	2
Giacomo Chiappori	LN	68,706	6.5	LN	62,755	6.5	2
Others		46,197	4.4	Others	32,480	3.3	0
Voters: 1,177,354 — Turnout: 79.6%

=== Emilia-Romagna ===
President				Regional council			
Candidate	Party	Votes	%	Alliance	Votes	%	Seats
Pier Luigi Bersani	PDS	1,508,241	53.8	Centre-left	1,464,349	56.9	34
Gianfranco Morra	FI	896,012	32.0	Centre-right	792,128	30.8	12
Renato Albertini	PRC	247,476	8.8	PRC	196,274	7.6	3
Pierluigi Copercini	LN	107,628	3.8	LN	86,400	3.4	1
Others		43,633	1.6	Others	33,995	1.3	0
Voters: 3,013,350 — Turnout: 88.3%

=== Tuscany ===
President				Regional council			
Candidate	Party	Votes	%	Alliance	Votes	%	Seats
Vannino Chiti	PDS	1,188,995	50.1	Centre-left	1,129,672	52.8	33
Paolo Del Debbio	FI	855,287	36.1	Centre-right	743,855	34.8	13
Luciano Ghelli	PRC	294,128	12.4	PRC	237,405	11.1	4
Others		33,856	1.4	Others	28,295	1.3	0
Voters: 2,582,763 — Turnout: 85.2%

=== Umbria ===
President				Regional council			
Candidate	Party	Votes	%	Alliance	Votes	%	Seats
Bruno Bracalente	PDS	331,349	59.9	Centre-left	324,443	62.7	18
Riccardo Pongelli	FI	215,570	39.0	Centre-right	189,030	36.5	12
Others		5,867	1.1	Others	4,368	0.8	0
Voters: 604,982 — Turnout: 85.6%

=== Marche ===
President				Regional council			
Candidate	Party	Votes	%	Alliance	Votes	%	Seats
Vito D'Ambrosio	PDS	486,631	51.6	Centre-left	454,563	54.0	26
Stefano Bastianoni	FI	367,030	38.9	Centre-right	320,805	38.1	12
Paolo Polenta	PPI	60,401	6.4	PPI	51,057	6.1	2
Others		29,711	3.1	Others	15,993	1.9	0
Voters: 1,050,546 — Turnout: 84.6%

=== Lazio ===
President				Regional council			
Candidate	Party	Votes	%	Alliance	Votes	%	Seats
Piero Badaloni	Ind	1,582,897	48.1	Centre-left	1,364,836	48.7	37
Alberto Michelini	FI	1,577,521	48.0	Centre-right	1,335,250	47.7	23
Others		127,929	3.9	Others	101,449	3.6	0
Voters: 3,852,697 — Turnout: 81.2%

=== Abruzzo ===
President				Regional council			
Candidate	Party	Votes	%	Alliance	Votes	%	Seats
Antonio Falconio	PPI	381,051	48.2	Centre-left	371,272	51.6	25
Piergiorgio Landini	AN	373,101	47.2	Centre-right	323,969	45.0	15
Others		36,079	4.6	Others	24,689	3.4	0
Voters: 887,581 — Turnout: 76.7%

=== Molise ===
President				Regional council			
Candidate	Party	Votes	%	Alliance	Votes	%	Seats
Marcello Veneziale	PDS	103,226	50.5	Centre-left	92,518	48.9	18
Quintino Pallante	FI	101,348	49.5	Centre-right	96,726	51.1	12
Voters: 230,149 — Turnout: 72.2%

=== Campania ===
President				Regional council			
Candidate	Party	Votes	%	Alliance	Votes	%	Seats
Antonio Rastrelli	AN	1,408,463	47.9	Centre-right	1,249,713	46.9	36
Giovanni Vacca	Ind	1,159,539	39.3	Centre-left	1,092,570	41.0	20
Giovanni Grasso	PPI	237,162	8.1	PPI	220,557	8.3	4
Others		92,857	3.1	Others	69,633	2.6	0
Voters: 3,408,449 — Turnout: 73.9%

=== Basilicata ===
President				Regional council			
Candidate	Party	Votes	%	Alliance	Votes	%	Seats
Raffaele Dinardo	PPI	190,744	54.9	Centre-left	190,253	59.1	18
Giampiero Perri	FI	126,804	36.5	Centre-right	110,566	34.4	10
Pietro Simonetti	PRC	22,361	6.4	PRC	17,144	5.3	2
Others		7,498	2.2	Others	3,714	1.2	0
Voters: 409,764 — Turnout: 78.6%

=== Apulia ===
President				Regional council			
Candidate	Party	Votes	%	Alliance	Votes	%	Seats
Salvatore Distaso	FI	1,071,186	49.8	Centre-right	927,959	47.5	38
Luigi Ferrara Mirenzi	PDS	986,782	45.9	Centre-left	956,619	49.0	25
Others		93,616	4.3	Others	68,282	3.5	0
Voters: 2,522,135 — Turnout: 75.7%

=== Calabria ===
President				Regional council			
Candidate	Party	Votes	%	Alliance	Votes	%	Seats
Giuseppe Nisticò	FI	456,545	44.1	Centre-right	417,068	45.0	25
Donato Tommaso Veraldi	PPI	392,227	37.9	Centre-left	349,551	37.8	13
Pasquino Crupi	PRC	98,742	9.5	PRC	80,851	8.7	3
Roberto Cangiamila	PRI	35,610	3.4	PRI	34,865	3.8	1
Others		53,123	5.1	Others	43,630	4.7	0
Voters: 1,215,634 — Turnout: 68.6%
