= List of members of the Regional Council of Tuscany, 2000–2005 =

The VII Legislature of the Regional Council of Tuscany, the legislative assembly of Tuscany, was inaugurated on 3 May 2000, following the 2000 regional election.

Riccardo Nencini (Italian Democratic Socialists) served as the president of the council, while Claudio Martini (Democrats of the Left) served as president of Tuscany at the head of his first regional government.

== Members ==
- Anna Annunziata
- Franco Banchi
- Giovanni Barbagli
- Paolo Bartolozzi (until 4 July 2001, elected to the European Parliament)
  - Angelo Pollina (since 4 July 2001)
- Giuliana Baudone
- Massimo Bellandi (until 14 February 2003, deceased)
  - Ambra Giorgi (since 21 February 2003)
- Maurizio Bianconi
- Sirio Bussolotti
- Marco Carraresi
- Roberto Caverni
- Enrico Cecchetti
- Anna Maria Celesti
- Pieraldo Ciucchi
- Paolo Cocchi
- Riccardo Conti
- Erasmo D'Angelis
- Maurizio Dinelli
- Filippo Fossati
- Agostino Fragai
- Lucia Franchini
- Tommaso Franci
- Nino Frosini
- Federico Gelli
- Luciano Ghelli
- Bruna Giovannini
- Alfonso Lippi
- Virgilio Luvisotti
- Andrea Manciulli
- Claudio Martini (president of Tuscany)
- Altero Matteoli (candidate president, until 23 May 2000, resigned)
  - Jacopo Ferri (since 24 May 2000)
- Carlo Melani (suspended from 6 May 2003 to 6 November 2004)
  - Alessia Petraglia (from 6 May 2003 to 6 November 2004)
- Alberto Monaci
- Riccardo Nencini (president of the Regional Council)
- Marisa Nicchi
- Fabio Pacini
- Ilio Pasqui
- Angelo Passaleva (until 27 March 2001, resigned)
  - Paolo Bambagioni (from 27 March 2001 to 10 April 2001)
  - Gianluca Parrini (since 10 April 2001)
- Francesco Pifferi
- Piero Pizzi
- Leopoldo Provenzali
- Mario Ricci
- Fabio Roggiolani
- Enrico Rossi
- Varis Rossi
- Virgilio Simonti
- Alessandro Starnini
- Achille Totato
- Loriano Valentini
- Denis Verdini (until 4 July 2001, elected to the Chamber of Deputies)
  - Paolo Marcheschi (since 4 July 2001)
- Lorenzo Zirri

== Executive branch ==
The Regional Government (Giunta Regionale) was sworn in on 18 May 2000.

| Member | Party | Delegate for |
|---|---|---|
| Claudio Martini (president) | DS | – |
| Angelo Passaleva (vice president) | PPI | |
| Riccardo Conti | DS | |
| Tommaso Franci | FdV | |
| Enrico Rossi | DS | |
| Tito Barbini | DS | |
| Paolo Benesperi | DS | |
| Chiara Boni | Ind. | |
| Ambrogio Brenna | Dem | |
| Susanna Cenni | DS | |
| Carla Guidi | Ind. | |
| Marco Montemagni | PCdI | |
| Maria Concetta Zoppi | DS | |
