= Giovanni Fratini =

Italian politician

Vice president of Tuscany
- In office 15 June 1993 – 13 June 1995
- President: Vannino Chiti
- Preceded by: Paolo Giannarelli
- Succeeded by: Marialina Marcucci

Member of the Regional Council of Tuscany
- In office 20 May 1990 – 24 April 1995

Mayor of San Vincenzo
- In office 1975–1982

Personal details
- Born: 24 September 1937 (age 88) Piombino, Province of Livorno, Kingdom of Italy
- Party: Italian Socialist Party
- Occupation: Insurance agent

Giovanni Fratini (born 24 September 1937) is an Italian politician who served as a member of the Regional Council of Tuscany (1990–1995) and as vice president of Tuscany (1993–1995).

== Life and career ==
A member of the Italian Socialist Party (PSI), Fratini served as mayor of San Vincenzo from 1975 to 1982 and later became secretary of the PSI federation of Livorno.

At the 1990 Tuscan regional election, Fratini was elected to the Regional Council of Tuscany for the Livorno constituency. He subsequently served in the regional government as assessor for healthcare and later for budget, finance and personnel. In 1993, he was appointed vice president of Tuscany.

Fratini also served as vice president of the Interporto Toscano Amerigo Vespucci company in Guasticce.
