= Simone Siliani =

Italian politician

Regional assessor of Social policies and Sports of Tuscany
- In office 13 June 1995 – 17 April 2000
- President: Vannino Chiti

President of the Regional Council of Tuscany
- In office 8 June 1993 – 7 June 1995
- Preceded by: Paolo Benelli
- Succeeded by: Angelo Passaleva

Member of the Regional Council of Tuscany
- In office 9 May 1990 – 17 April 2000

Personal details
- Born: 10 June 1962 (age 64) Florence, Italy
- Party: Italian Communist Party; Democratic Party of the Left
- Occupation: Journalist

Simone Siliani (born 10 June 1962) is an Italian politician and journalist who served as president of the Regional Council of Tuscany from 1993 to 1995 and as a regional assessor in the Government of Tuscany from 1995 to 2000.

== Life and career ==
Born in Florence, Siliani graduated in literature and philosophy and worked as a journalist for the magazine Testimonianze. He became involved in politics through the local peace movement and his collaboration with Ernesto Balducci. He joined the Italian Communist Party and also served as regional secretary of the Italian Communist Youth Federation. In 1985, he was elected municipal councillor in Fiesole.

Siliani was elected to the Regional Council of Tuscany in the 1990 Tuscan regional election. During the legislature he served on several council committees and became president of the Regional Council in June 1993, replacing Paolo Benelli. He was re-elected in the 1995 Tuscan election as a member of the Democratic Party of the Left and subsequently joined the regional government as assessor for social policies and sports.

Siliani later served as a municipal assessor for culture in Florence from 1999 to 2006, during the administration led by mayor Leonardo Domenici.

After leaving elected office, he worked in the cultural heritage sector and collaborated with the Fondazione Culturale Responsabilità Etica. Between 2011 and 2016, he served as an adviser to the president of Tuscany, Enrico Rossi, and since 2016 he has been director of the Fondazione Finanza Etica.
