= Stefania Saccardi =

Italian politician (born 1960)

President of the Regional Council of Tuscany
- Incumbent
- Assumed office 10 November 2025
- Preceded by: Antonio Mazzeo

Vice president of Tuscany
- In office 22 October 2020 – 30 October 2025
- President: Eugenio Giani
- Preceded by: Monica Barni
- Succeeded by: Mia Diop
- In office 17 February 2014 – 17 June 2015
- President: Enrico Rossi
- Preceded by: Stella Targetti
- Succeeded by: Monica Barni

Regional assessor to Agriculture and food of Tuscany
- In office 22 October 2020 – 30 October 2025
- President: Eugenio Giani

Regional assessor to Healthcare of Tuscany
- In office 1 July 2015 – 8 October 2020
- President: Enrico Rossi

Deputy mayor of Florence
- In office 11 March 2013 – 14 February 2014
- Mayor: Matteo Renzi

Personal details
- Born: 5 November 1960 (age 65) Florence, Italy
- Party: IV (since 2019)
- Other political affiliations: PD (till 2019)
- Profession: Lawyer

Stefania Saccardi (born 5 November 1960) is an Italian politician who has served as president of the Regional Council of Tuscany since 10 November 2025.

A former member of the Democratic Party aligned with Matteo Renzi's faction, she later followed him in founding Italia Viva in 2019. She has previously served as deputy mayor of Florence (2013–2014), regional assessor for Healthcare (2015–2020) and for Agriculture and food (2020–2025), and vice president of Tuscany (2014–2015, 2020–2025).

== Early life ==
Born in Florence, Saccardi graduated in 1979 from the "Niccolò Machiavelli" classical high school. She continued her studies at the University of Florence, where she earned a degree in law in 1987. In 1990, she was admitted to the Bar Association of Florence.

She worked in the press office of the Ministry of the Interior and later became head of the political secretariat of the Undersecretary at the Ministry of Justice.

== Political career ==
Saccardi began her political career with the Christian Democracy party, being elected to the municipal council of Campi Bisenzio in 1985, where she served until 1993. From 2004 to 2008, she also held the positions of deputy mayor and assessor for urban planning.

In 2009, she was elected to the Florence City Council and appointed assessor for welfare and sports. In March 2013, Matteo Renzi named her deputy mayor of Florence. In February 2014, she was appointed by Enrico Rossi to join the regional government as vice president of Tuscany.

In the 2015 Tuscan regional elections, she was elected to the Regional Council of Tuscany for the Democratic Party and, on 1 July 2015, was appointed regional assessor for healthcare in the second Rossi cabinet. In 2019, she left the Democratic Party and joined Italia Viva.

Saccardi was confirmed at the Regional Council in the 2020 election. On 28 October, she was appointed vice president of Tuscany and regional assessor for agriculture, food, hunting, and fishing in the executive led by president Eugenio Giani.

In 2024, she ran for mayor of Florence as the Italia Viva candidate, opposing the centre-left candidate Sara Funaro and the centre-right candidate Eike Schmidt. Saccardi received 7.5% of the vote and nonetheless secured a seat on the city council.

In the 2025 Tuscan regional election, she was elected for the third time. On 10 November 2025, during the opening session of the 12th Legislature, she was elected president of the Regional Council.
