= Stella Targetti =

Vice president of Tuscany
- In office 27 April 2010 – 16 February 2014
- President: Enrico Rossi
- Preceded by: Federico Gelli
- Succeeded by: Stefania Saccardi

Regional assessor for education, university and research of Tuscany
- In office 27 April 2010 – 16 February 2014
- President: Enrico Rossi

Personal details
- Born: 25 November 1973 (age 52) Florence, Italy
- Education: University of Florence
- Occupation: Business executive

Stella Targetti (born 25 November 1973) is an Italian business executive and politician who served as vice president of Tuscany from 2010 to 2014.

== Education and business career ==
Born in Florence in 1973, she is the daughter of businessman Paolo Targetti, former president of Confindustria Firenze. Targetti graduated in economics and commerce from the University of Florence. Since 2007, she has served as vice president for marketing at Targetti Poulsen, overseeing communication and marketing strategies for the Targetti Group, her family-owned company in architectural lighting.

Since 2004, she has been a member of the board of directors of the Fondazione Targetti, which promotes research and cultural initiatives in light, art, and architecture. She is also publisher of the digital magazine lightingacademy.org, dedicated to lighting design and architecture.

== Political activity ==
Targetti coordinated youth initiatives in Tuscany for the electoral committees supporting Romano Prodi and collaborated with the electoral campaign of Claudio Martini for president of Tuscany. She served as head of the training school of the Democrats of the Left and was elected to the Regional Constituent Assembly of the Democratic Party in 2007. She has also held roles within Confindustria Firenze.

From 27 April 2010 to 16 February 2014, she served as vice president of Tuscany, with responsibility for education, universities and research, and the organization of regional offices. Targetti left her position during a government reshuffle coinciding with Matteo Renzi's appointment as Prime Minister of Italy. Regional president Enrico Rossi stated that the change was due to shifts in the political landscape and not a change in the governing majority. Stefania Saccardi took over Targetti's responsibilities for education and training. The decision caused discontent, leading to a formal warning from the regional Constitutional Guarantee Board. Targetti filed an appeal against the reshuffle, which was subsequently rejected.
