= Marialina Marcucci =

Italian media executive and politician

Vice president of Tuscany
- In office 13 June 1995 – 17 April 2000
- President: Vannino Chiti
- Preceded by: Giovanni Fratini
- Succeeded by: Angelo Passaleva

Regional assessor of Tuscany
- In office 13 June 1995 – 17 April 2000
- President: Vannino Chiti

Personal details
- Born: 28 January 1954 (age 72) Barga, Province of Lucca, Italy
- Profession: Businesswoman, media executive

Marialina Marcucci (born 28 January 1954) is an Italian businesswoman, media executive and politician. She is best known as the founder of Videomusic, one of Italy's first music television channels, and for serving as vice president of Tuscany from 1995 to 2000.

== Life and career ==
Born in Barga and raised in Castelvecchio Pascoli, Marcucci is a member of a local family active in the pharmaceutical, media and paper industries. She is the daughter of entrepreneur Guelfo Marcucci and the sister of businessman and politician Andrea Marcucci and pharmaceutical executive Paolo Marcucci.

In 1984 she founded Videomusic through Beta Television and served as its president. In 1988 she led the acquisition of the British pan-European television channel Super Channel, serving as managing director until its sale to NBC in 1993. She subsequently chaired Marcucci Comunicazione, a group of European companies operating in television broadcasting, satellite transmission and multimedia services.

Marcucci entered politics in 1995, when she was elected to the Regional Council of Tuscany supporting president Vannino Chiti. She was subsequently appointed vice president of Tuscany and regional assessor responsible for culture, communications and entertainment. In 1999 her responsibilities were expanded to include tourism, high technology, emigration and investment in cultural heritage.

After leaving office in 2000, Marcucci returned to the communications and publishing sector, founding Brama Editrice and Ultima. She served as president of the newspaper L'Unità from 2002 to 2008 and later founded Campus Studi del Mediterraneo, an educational foundation collaborating with Italian and international universities.

Since 2007 she has served as president of the Robert Kennedy Foundation of Europe. In 2016 she became the first woman appointed president of the Viareggio Carnival Foundation. In 2020 she received the Marisa Bellisario Award.

In 2026, Marcucci ran as an independent candidate for mayor of Viareggio, receiving 27% of the vote in the first round. She was subsequently elected to the City Council, where she is serving as a member of the opposition group.
