= Roberto Barzanti =

Italian politician

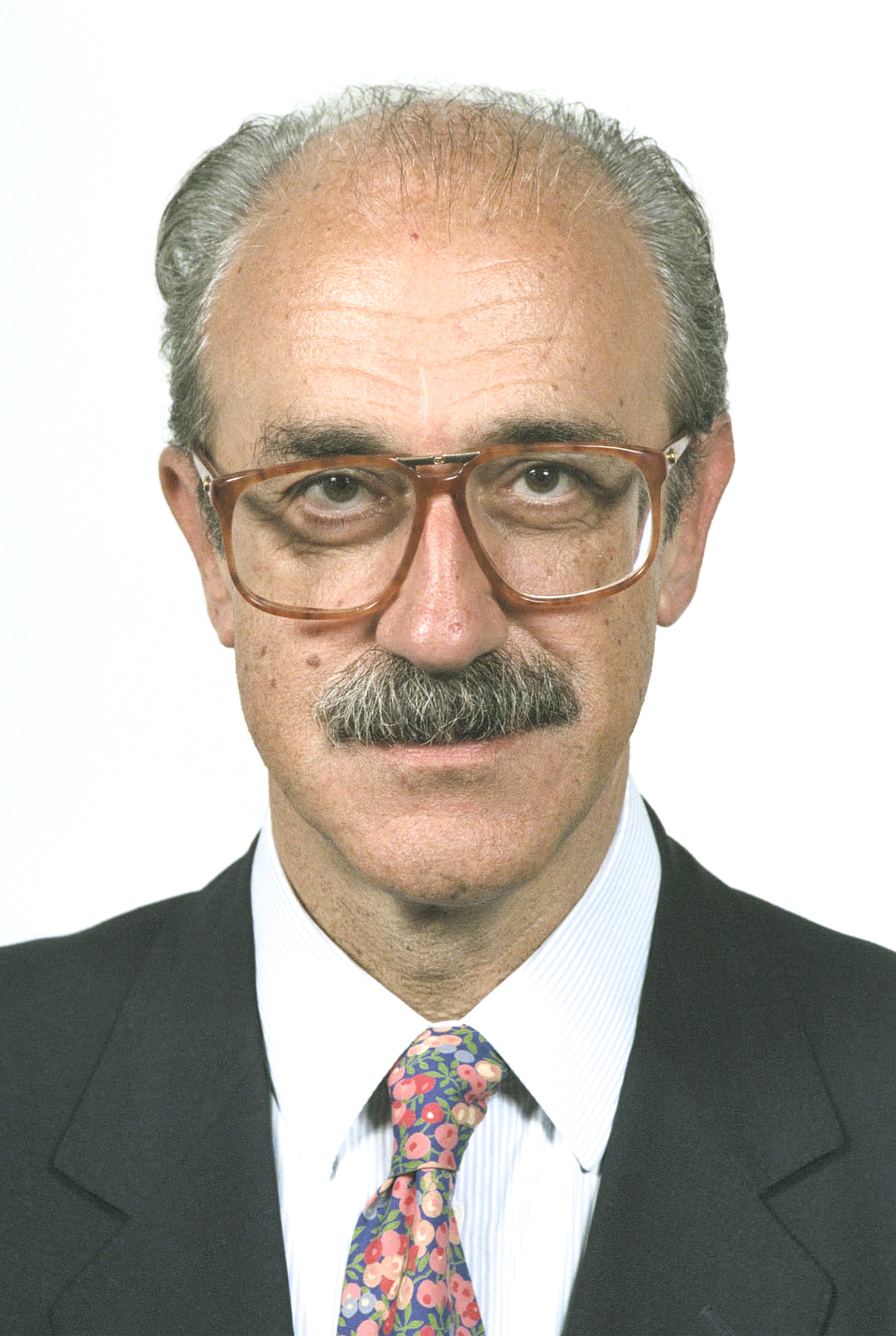
- Barzanti in 1994

Vice-President of the European Parliament
- In office 14 January 1992 – 18 July 1994

Member of the European Parliament
- In office 24 July 1984 – 19 July 1999

Regional assessor of Local Authorities, General Affairs and Personnel of Tuscany
- In office 28 July 1975 – 14 September 1979
- President: Lelio Lagorio (1975–78); Mario Leone (1978–79)

Member of the Regional Council of Tuscany
- In office June 1975 – 14 September 1979

Mayor of Siena
- In office 2 December 1969 – 11 January 1974
- Preceded by: Luciano Mencaraglia
- Succeeded by: Canzio Vannini

Personal details
- Born: 24 January 1939 (age 87) Monterotondo Marittimo, Province of Grosseto, Kingdom of Italy
- Party: PSI (till 1964); PSIUP (1964-1974); PCI (1974-1991); PDS (1991-1998); DS (1998-2007); PD (since 2007)
- Education: Scuola Normale Superiore
- Profession: Audiovisual consultant, academic

Roberto Barzanti (born 24 January 1939) is an Italian politician.

== Career ==
A member of the Italian Socialist Party of Proletarian Unity, Barzanti was elected Mayor of Siena on 2 December 1969.

He joined the Italian Communist Party in 1974 and was elected to the Regional Council of Tuscany in June 1975, being appointed as regional assessor of Local Authorities, General Affairs and Personnel. He held the position until September 1979, when he resigned to take up the role of Deputy Mayor of Siena and President of the Intermunicipal Association.

Barzanti was elected to the European Parliament in 1984, serving for three legislatures (II, III, IV). He was Vice-President of the European Parliament from 4 January 1992 to 18 July 1994.

== Honour ==
- Italy: Knight Grand Cross of the Order of Merit of the Italian Republic (28 july 2010)

== See also ==
- 1984 European Parliament election
- 1989 European Parliament election
- 1994 European Parliament election
- List of mayors of Siena

Political offices
Preceded by Luciano Mencaraglia	Mayor of Siena; 1969–1974	Succeeded by Canzio Vannini
