= 1995 Lombard regional election =

- 23 April 1995

All 90 seats to the Regional Council of Lombardy
- Turnout: 84.24% (▼6.97%)
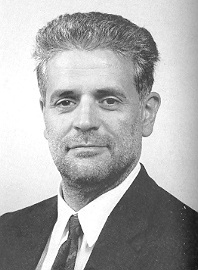

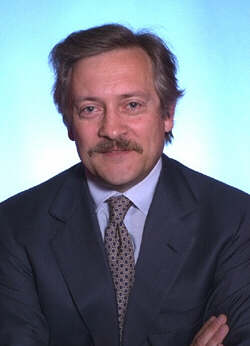

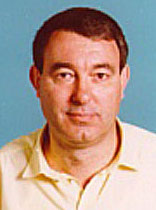
	Majority party	Minority party	Third party
Leader	Roberto Formigoni	Diego Masi	Francesco Speroni
Party	FI	PdD	LN
Alliance	Centre-right	Centre-left
Seats won	54	19	12
Popular vote	2,200,921	1,462,438	937,649
Percentage	41.1%	27.4%	18.7%
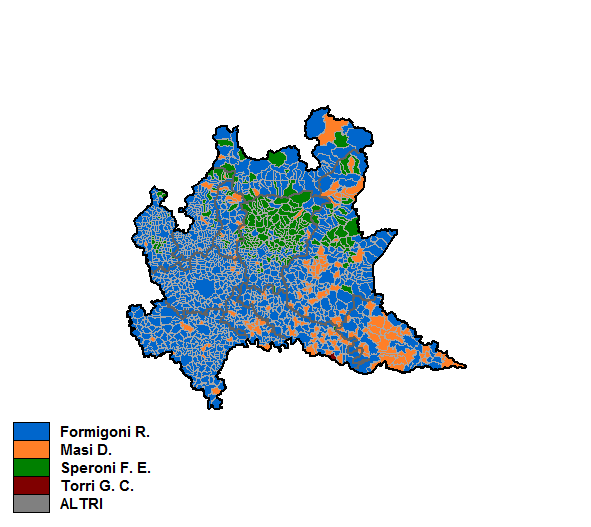
President before election
Paolo Arrigoni
LN
President-elect
Roberto Formigoni
FI

The 1995 Lombard regional election took place on 23 April 1995. The 6th term of the Regional Council was chosen.

For the first time the President of the Region was directly elected by the people, although the election was not yet binding and the President-elect could have been replaced during the term.

Roberto Formigoni (member of the right wing of the Italian People's Party, on the list of Forza Italia) was elected President of the Region, defeating Diego Masi (Segni Pact) and Francesco Speroni (Northern League).

== Electoral system ==
Lombardy used for the first time the national Tatarella Law to elect its Council. Sixty-four councillors are elected in provincial constituencies by proportional representation using the largest remainder method with a Droop quota and open lists; remained seats and votes are grouped at regional level where a Hare quota is used, and then distributed to provincial party lists.

Sixteen councillors are elected at-large using a general ticket: parties are grouped in alliances, and the alliance which receives a plurality of votes elects all its candidates, its leader becoming the President of Lombardy. If an alliance wins more than 60% of votes, only 8 candidates from the regional list will be chosen and the number of those elected in provincial constituencies will be 72; if the winning alliance receives less than 50% of votes, special seats are added to the Council to ensure a large majority for the President's coalition.

== Council apportionment ==
According to the official 1991 Italian census, the 64 Council seats which must be covered by proportional representation were so distributed between Lombard provinces.

BG	BS	CO	CR	LC	LO	MN	MI	PV	SO	VA	total
7	8	4	2	2	1	3	27	3	1	6	64

The allocation is not fixed. Remaining seats and votes after proportional distribution, are all grouped at regional level and divided by party lists. The consequent division of these seats at provincial level usually change the original apportionment. Only 41 seats were directly assigned at provincial level, and the final distribution between provinces changed in this way.

BG	BS	CO	CR	LC	LO	MN	MI	PV	SO	VA	total
+3	+3	+1	=	=	=	-1	+1	+2	=	+1	+10

As it can be seen, the simple plurality victory of the Pole of Freedoms caused the distribution of ten more seats to the President's majority at provincial level. Brescia and Como and Pavia received two new seats, Bergamo and Lodi and Milan and Varese one each.

== Parties and candidates ==
Political party or alliance	Constituent lists	Previous result		Candidate
Political party or alliance	Constituent lists	Votes (%)	Seats	Candidate
Centre-left coalition	Populars	28.6	25	Diego Masi
Centre-left coalition	Democratic Party of the Left	18.8	15	Diego Masi
Centre-left coalition	Federation of the Greens	5.2	3	Diego Masi
Centre-left coalition	Pact of Democrats	—N/a	—N/a	Diego Masi
Centre-left coalition	Labour Federation	—N/a	—N/a	Diego Masi
Centre-left coalition	Populars and Democrats	—N/a	—N/a	Diego Masi
Northern League – Lombard League		18.9	15	Francesco Speroni
Centre-right coalition	National Alliance	2.5	2	Roberto Formigoni
Centre-right coalition	Forza Italia – The People's Pole	—N/a	—N/a	Roberto Formigoni
Centre-right coalition	Christian Democratic Centre	—N/a	—N/a	Roberto Formigoni
Centre-right coalition	Pensioners of Sun	—N/a	—N/a	Roberto Formigoni
Pensioners' Party		1.8	1	Carlo Fatuzzo
Pannella's coalition	Pannella List	1.0	1	Marco Pannella
Pannella's coalition	Autonomist Front	—N/a	—N/a	Marco Pannella
Communist Refoundation Party		—N/a	—N/a	Giuseppe Torri

== Results ==
In the context of the profound political changes that invested Italy between 1992 and 1994, Italian Parliament changed the regional electoral law, adapting them to new majoritarian principle now in vogue in the country, trim and tend bipolar politics. The new political geography, however, did not fit properly to Lombardy where, besides a garrison of far-left, assumed significant importance the presence of Umberto Bossi's Northern League, during the previous five years had not made any secret to aim the conquest of the Regional Presidency as a key step for a transformation of Italy in a federal state. In addition to the League, however, another major innovation had originated in Lombardy in 1994: the descent into the political field of Silvio Berlusconi, who by its movement Forza Italia had collected anti-Communist orphans of deceased traditional parties.

The central political alliances had not been followed up at Lombardy, with the League in sharp contrast with Forza Italia, not only for connecting the latter with the newly formed training nationalist and post-fascist of National Alliance, but mainly because the entrance into the political arena of Forza Italia, accused by the League to be the trojan horse for the recycling of the old political class, had led to the arrest of the Northern League's electoral steady ascent - which had previously yielded the capture of the City of Milan in 1993 - if not also a marked reflux into the consent of the federalist party.

The election on 23 April saw the success of the broad coalition of Berlusconi, grouping ex-Christian Democrats, ex-Socialists, Liberals and post-fascist, and led to presidency Communion and Liberation's Roberto Formigoni that, with the majority premium, was able to give life to the first government in the history of the region that managed to last the entire legislature.

23 April 1995 Lombard regional election results
Candidates	Votes	%	Seats	Parties	Votes	%	Seat
Roberto Formigoni	2,386,732	41.07	16				
Roberto Formigoni	2,386,732	41.07	16	Forza Italia – The People's Pole	1,455,706	29.24	28
Roberto Formigoni	2,386,732	41.07	16	National Alliance	496,939	9.98	8
Roberto Formigoni	2,386,732	41.07	16	Christian Democratic Centre	110,058	2.21	2
Roberto Formigoni	2,386,732	41.07	16	Pensioners of Sun	14,518	0.29	–
Roberto Formigoni	2,386,732	41.07	16	Total	2,077,221	41.72	38
Diego Masi	1,591,417	27.39	–				
Diego Masi	1,591,417	27.39	–	Democratic Party of the Left	821,280	16.50	11
Diego Masi	1,591,417	27.39	–	Italian People's Party	321,314	6.45	4
Diego Masi	1,591,417	27.39	–	Federation of the Greens	154,624	3.11	2
Diego Masi	1,591,417	27.39	–	Pact of Democrats	146,293	2.94	2
Diego Masi	1,591,417	27.39	–	Labour Federation	18,682	0.38	–
Diego Masi	1,591,417	27.39	–	Populars and Democrats	11,146	0.22	–
Diego Masi	1,591,417	27.39	–	Total	1,473,339	29.59	19
Francesco Speroni	1,087,128	18.71	–	Northern League – Lombard League	879,139	17.66	12
Giuseppe Torri	459,051	7.90	–	Communist Refoundation Party	381,221	7.66	5
Marco Pannella	165,838	2.85	–				
Marco Pannella	165,838	2.85	–	Pannella List	90,445	1.82	–
Marco Pannella	165,838	2.85	–	Autonomist Front	5.596	0.11	–
Marco Pannella	165,838	2.85	–	Total	96,041	1.93	–
Carlo Fatuzzo	120,665	2.08	–	Pensioners' Party	71,608	1.44	–
Total candidates	5,810,831	100.00	16	Total parties	4,978,569	100.00	74
Source: Ministry of the Interior – Historical Archive of Elections

Popular vote (party)
FI	29.24%
LN	17.66%
PDS	16.50%
AN	9.98%
PRC	7.66%
PPI	6.45%
FdV	3.11%
PdD	2.94%
CCD	2.21%
Pannella List	1.82%
PP	1.44%
Others	0.99%

Popular vote (coalition)
Pole	41.72%
Olive Tree	29.59%
LN	17.66%
PRC	7.66%
Pannella List	1.93%
Pensioners	1.44%

=== Results by province ===
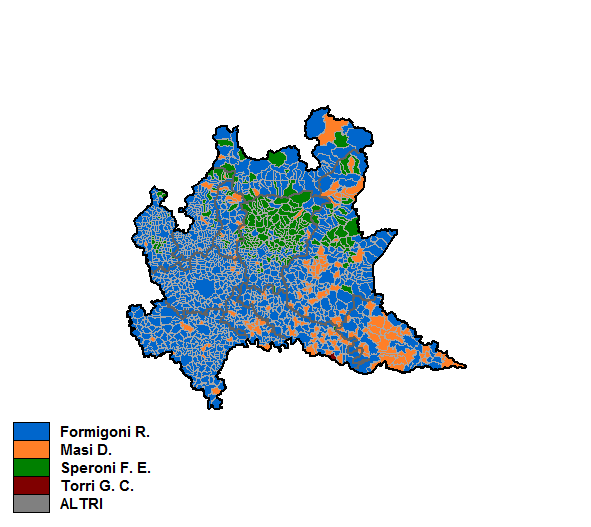
Election results map. Orange denotes municipalities won by Masi, Blue denotes those won by Formigoni, Green denotes those won by Speroni and Dark red denotes those won by Torri.

Province	Roberto Formigoni	Diego Masi	Francesco Speroni	Giuseppe Torri	Turnout
Milan	1,055,959 (44.04%)	686,933 (28.65%)	308,557 (12.87%)	219,034 (9.14%)	81.15%
Brescia	261,475 (37.18%)	206,475 (29.36%)	161,185 (22.92%)	43,162 (6.14%)	88.07%
Bergamo	217,679 (34.90%)	141,144 (22.63%)	188,726 (30.26%)	35,518 (5.69%)	87.70%
Varese	207,136 (40.91%)	110,368 (21.80%)	136,866 (27.03%)	33,079 (6.53%)	82.79%
Como	151,132 (44.32%)	73,498 (21.55%)	80,339 (23.56%)	21,126 (6.19%)	84.77%
Pavia	146,761 (44.74%)	86,502 (26.37%)	47,626 (14.52%)	31,512 (9.61%)	85.90%
Mantua	88,822 (35.44%)	95,032 (37.92%)	36,581 (14.60%)	23,035 (9.19%)	87.04%
Cremona	89,472 (39.35%)	70,704 (31.09%)	33,182 (14.59%)	21,589 (9.49%)	89.81%
Lecco	72,633 (36.72%)	58,694 (29.68%)	46,622 (23.57%)	12,263 (6.20%)	87.32%
Lodi	52,052 (41.28%)	39,594 (31.40%)	15,858 (12.58%)	12,021 (9.53%)	89.04%
Sondrio	43,611 (40.00%)	22,473 (20.61%)	31,586 (28.97%)	6,712 (6.16%)	82.75%

=== Results by capital city ===
City	Roberto Formigoni	Diego Masi	Francesco Speroni	Giuseppe Torri	Turnout
Milan	406,163 (48.34%)	236,249 (28.12%)	77,362 (9.21%)	73,409 (8.74%)	75.87%
Brescia	52,920 (39.95%)	43,844 (33.10%)	20,869 (15.76%)	8,802 (6.65%)	85.27%
Bergamo	33,591 (41.07%)	22,373 (27.35%)	15,659 (19.14%)	4,701 (5.75%)	85.83%
Como	27,783 (49.60%)	13,027 (23.26%)	8,882 (15.86%)	3,801 (6.79%)	80.89%
Varese	22,923 (43.52%)	12,103 (22.98%)	12,746 (24.20%)	2,761 (2.46%)	78.94%
Pavia	22,637 (44.32%)	14,708 (28.80%)	6,701 (13.12%)	4,170 (8.16%)	84.99%
Cremona	20,190 (38.31%)	17,838 (33.85%)	6,353 (12.06%)	5,289 (10.04%)	88.68%
Mantua	12,463 (35.19%)	14,359 (40.54%)	4,015 (11.34%)	3,337 (9.42%)	83.36%
Lecco	12,200 (40.09%)	9,668 (31.77%)	5,555 (18.26%)	1,826 (6.00%)	84.27%
Lodi	12,424 (42.80%)	9,087 (31.31%)	3,574 (12.31%)	2,235 (7.70%)	85.19%
Sondrio	5,938 (42.67%)	3,287 (23.62%)	2,944 (21.16%)	1,103 (7.93%)	77.88%
