= Mauro Ginanneschi =

Italian politician (born 1946)

Member of the Regional Council of Tuscany
- In office May 1985 – 17 April 2000

Regional assessor of Tuscany
- In office 17 June 1986 – 24 April 1992
- In office January 1994 – May 1994
- In office 10 November 1998 – 17 April 2000

Member of the Provincial Council of Grosseto
- In office 1975–1985

Personal details
- Born: 11 August 1946 (age 79) Castel del Piano, Province of Grosseto, Italy
- Party: Italian Communist Party (1970–91); Democratic Party of the Left (1991–98)

Mauro Ginanneschi (born 11 August 1946) is an Italian politician. A member of the Italian Communist Party and later the Democratic Party of the Left, he held several local and regional offices in Tuscany between the 1970s and the late 1990s. He served as a member of the Regional Council of Tuscany and regional assessor.

== Life and career ==
Ginanneschi completed lower secondary education and became politically active within the Italian Communist Party (PCI). He served as a municipal councillor in Arcidosso from 1970 to 1975 and later in Monte Argentario from 1990 to 1995. Between 1975 and 1985 he was a member of the Provincial Council of Grosseto, where he also served as vice-president and assessor for public works.

He was elected to the Regional Council of Tuscany in the 1985 regional elections in the Grosseto constituency, receiving 10,402 preference votes. In June 1986, he joined the regional executive as assessor for land use and urban planning. Re-elected in 1990, Ginanneschi retained executive responsibilities until January 1992, when he became vice president of the Regional Council. Following the dissolution of the PCI, he joined the Democratic Party of the Left. He later returned to the regional executive in 1994.

In the 1995 regional elections, Ginanneschi was re-elected in the Grosseto constituency with 6,405 votes. From November 1998 he served as regional assessor to the presidency, with responsibility for institutional coordination, territorial agreements, and civil protection, later also assuming responsibility for economic and productive activities.

During the early 2000s, he was director of Toscana Promozione, the regional agency responsible for promoting Tuscany. In 2006, he became a member of the board of directors of the Tuscan Archipelago National Park, having been appointed by the Ministry of Agriculture and Forests.
