= Claudio Alvaro Carosi =

Italian politician

Regional assessor for Industry and Labour of Tuscany
- In office 13 August 1985 – 26 May 1987

Regional assessor for Budget and Finance of Tuscany
- In office 18 December 1987 – 22 June 1993

Regional assessor for Healthcare of Tuscany
- In office 25 January 1994 – 24 April 1995

President of the Regional Council of Tuscany
- In office 26 May 1987 – 18 December 1987
- Preceded by: Giacomo Maccheroni
- Succeeded by: Enzo Pezzati

Member of the Regional Council of Tuscany
- In office 1985 – 24 April 1995

Personal details
- Born: 6 February 1942 (age 84) Rome, Kingdom of Italy
- Party: Italian Democratic Socialist Party

Claudio Alvaro Carosi (born 6 February 1942) is an Italian politician who served as a member of the Regional Council of Tuscany and as assessor in the Tuscan regional government.

== Life and career ==
Born in Rome and resident in Florence, Carosi graduated in law and began working in 1966 as a senior manager at INAIL in Prato and Florence, also serving as a training course manager. He was active in trade union and politics as secretary of the Florence provincial federation of the Italian Democratic Socialist Party (PSDI) and later as regional deputy secretary of the party.

Carosi was first elected to the Regional Council of Tuscany in the 1985 Tuscan regional election in the Florence constituency with 1,661 votes. During the legislature he was part of the regional government as assessor for Labour (1985–1987) and later for Budget (1987–1990). From May to December 1987 he served as president of the Regional Council, replacing Giacomo Maccheroni.

He was re-elected in the 1990 election with 3,035 votes and was re-confirmed as a regional assessor for Budget (1990–1993) and then for Healthcare (1994–1995).
