= Andrea Febbraio =

Italian entrepreneur, writer, professor, and investor

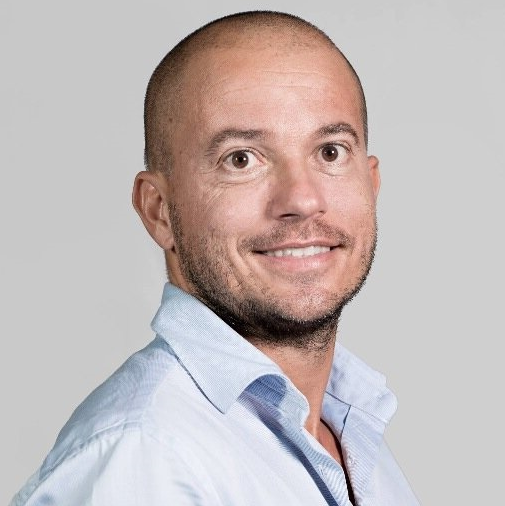
- Occupations: Entrepreneur, Writer, Professor, Podcaster
- Known for: Founder, Hypercast

Andrea Febbraio is an Italian entrepreneur, writer, professor, and podcaster. Febbraio is the founder of Hypercast, an Italian podcast startup. He is also the creator of the podcast "Ciao Cicci."

As a writer, Febbraio is the co-author of Viral Video: Content is King, Distribution is Queen and Buzz Marketing Nei Social Media, business books in the field of digital marketing and social media. Febbraio is an angel investor and venture capitalist as well as a senior lecturer at SDA Bocconi School of Management and LUISS Business School. His success as an entrepreneur was documented in the book Startup di Successo, a book detailing 20 years of Italy's internet entrepreneurs.

== Career ==
Febbraio began his career working at internet platform and digital media agencies during the dot-com boom in the 1990s. He is an economics graduate and became a business school lecturer in 2010. Febbraio is the former CEO of PromoDigital, an online advertising company founded by Diego Masi in 2008. The company was the first buzz marketing platform in Italy and was sold two years later to the Wikio Group, Europe's top blog-ranking service.

Febbraio's expanded his career to encompass that of an educator in 2010. He is a senior lecturer at SDA Bocconi School of Management and LUISS Business School where he teaches M.B.A. students. He is also a professional speaker, previously speaking at events such as the Cannes Lions International Festival of Creativity, Social Media Week, I Strategy, and IAB Forum. His investing career is that of an angel investor as well as a partner in the venture capital firm Adriadne Capital.

As a writer, Febbraio has published two books. The first is Buzz Marketing Nei Social Media, a business book about buzz marketing in social media that was published in 2009. In 2014, he co-authored Viral Video: Content is King, Distribution is Queen along with Dario Caiazzo and Umberto Lisiero.

=== Bibliography ===
Publication year	Title	ISBN	Notes
2013	Viral Video: Content is King, Distribution is Queen	ISBN 9788867050987	Co-author with Dario Caiazzo and Umberto Lisiero, published by Ledizioni
2009	Buzz Marketing Nei Social Media	ISBN 9788895962375	Published by Fausto Lupetti Editore
