= Edda Fagni =

Italian politician, pedagogue and trade unionist

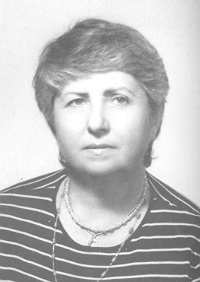

Senator of the Republic
- In office 23 April 1992 – 8 May 1996

Member of the Chamber of Deputies
- In office 2 July 1983 – 22 April 1992

Regional assessor for General affairs, Personnel and Statistics
- In office 18 May 1982 – 31 May 1983
- President: Mario Leone

Member of the Regional Council of Tuscany
- In office June 1980 – 7 June 1983
- Succeeded by: Catalina Schezzini

Personal details
- Born: 28 March 1927 Livorno, Kingdom of Italy
- Died: 28 August 1996 (aged 69) Livorno, Italy
- Party: Italian Communist Party

Edda Fagni (28 March 1927 – 28 August 1996) was an Italian politician, pedagogue and trade unionist. A member of the Italian Communist Party (PCI), she served in the Chamber of Deputies, the Senate, and the Regional Council of Tuscany.

She served as a municipal assessor in Livorno from 1975 to 1980 and was elected to the Regional Council of Tuscany in 1980. From 18 May 1982 until her resignation on 31 May 1983, she served as regional assessor for General affairs, Personnel, Statistics and Data processing.

Fagni was elected to the Chamber of Deputies in 1983 and served until 1992. She was then elected to the Senate, serving from 1992 until 1996. She died in Livorno in 1996 at the age of 69.
