= Lino Federigi =

Italian politician (1927–2006)

Regional assessor of Tuscany
- In office 1970–1985

Member of the Regional Council of Tuscany
- In office 1970–1985

Mayor of Viareggio
- In office 22 August 1988 – 23 October 1989

Personal details
- Born: 28 August 1927 Forte dei Marmi, Kingdom of Italy
- Died: 5 April 2006 (aged 78)
- Party: Italian Communist Party

Lino Federigi (28 August 1927 – 5 April 2006) was an Italian politician of the Italian Communist Party who served as a regional assessor of Tuscany and as a member of the Regional Council of Tuscany. He also served as mayor of Viareggio.

== Life and career ==
A trade unionist by background, he served as secretary of the PCI federation in Viareggio from 1958 to 1970. He held local offices such as councillor of Viareggio and member of the Provincial Council of Lucca.

Federigi was elected to the Regional Council of Tuscany in 1970 and was re-elected in 1975 and 1980. During his fifteen years in regional government, he served as a regional assessor.

He was appointed assessor for trade and tourism during the first legislature of Tuscany's regional government (1970–1975). In 1975, under president Lelio Lagorio, he was given responsibility for labour affairs. Following a government reshuffle in December 1977, he was assigned the portfolios of environment, public housing, and public works, responsibilities he retained in the subsequent administration led by Mario Leone after Lagorio's resignation in 1978. Reappointed as regional assessor in 1980, he served in charge of general and institutional affairs, personnel, statistics, and data processing until May 1982, when he was appointed assessor for soil and environmental protection, public works, public housing, and transport.

He served as mayor of Viareggio from August 1988 to October 1989, heading a coalition government formed by the PCI, Christian Democracy, the Italian Democratic Socialist Party, and the Italian Liberal Party.
