= Alberto Magnolfi =

Italian politician and lawyer

Vice president of Tuscany
- In office 19 July 1990 – 11 January 1992
- President: Marco Marcucci
- Preceded by: Paolo Benelli
- Succeeded by: Giacomino Granchi

Member of the Regional Council of Tuscany
- In office 27 April 2005 – 17 June 2015
- In office 13 August 1985 – 11 January 1992

Personal details
- Born: 8 September 1944 (age 81) Prato, Province of Florence, Kingdom of Italy
- Party: Italian Socialist Party; Forza Italia; The People of Freedom; New Centre-Right
- Occupation: Lawyer

Alberto Magnolfi (born 8 September 1944) is an Italian lawyer and politician who served as a member of the Regional Council of Tuscany and as vice president of Tuscany.

== Life and career ==
A member of the Italian Socialist Party (PSI), he served as municipal assessor for urban planning and as deputy mayor of Prato from 1975 to 1985, before being elected to the Regional Council of Tuscany in 1985 and again in 1990.

During his first period in regional office, Magnolfi served as regional assessor for transport, infrastructure and public housing, and later as vice president of Tuscany and regional assessor for healthcare (1990–1991). Following the dissolution of the PSI in the early 1990s, he left active politics and returned to legal practice.

Magnolfi joined Forza Italia in 2003 and was elected once again to the Regional Council of Tuscany in 2005 and 2010. During this period he chaired the Forza Italia and later The People of Freedom group in the council. In 2013 he became leader of the New Centre-Right group in the Regional Council.
