= Giacomino Granchi =

Italian politician (1946–2011)

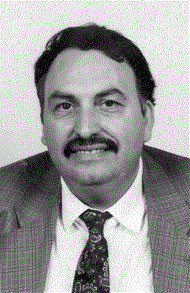

Mayor of Pisa
- In office 15 July 1986 – 20 January 1990
- Preceded by: Oriano Ripoli
- Succeeded by: Sergio Cortopassi

Vice president of Tuscany
- In office 11 January 1992 – 20 October 1992
- Preceded by: Alberto Magnolfi
- Succeeded by: Paolo Giannarelli

Member of the Regional Council of Tuscany
- In office 29 May 1990 – 24 April 1995

Personal details
- Born: 14 November 1946 Pisa, Italy
- Died: 3 April 2011 (aged 64) Pisa, Tuscany, Italy
- Party: Italian Socialist Party
- Profession: Employee

Giacomino Granchi (14 November 1946 – 3 April 2011) was an Italian politician.

Granchi was a member of the Italian Socialist Party and was elected mayor of Pisa on 15 July 1986, after the resignation of mayor Oriano Ripoli. He served as assessor for urban planning in the Regional Government of Tuscany (1990–1992), and vice president of Tuscany in 1992.

Political offices
Preceded by Oriano Ripoli	Mayor of Pisa; 1986–1990	Succeeded by Sergio Cortopassi
