= Anselmo Pucci =

Italian trade unionist and politician (1923–1998)

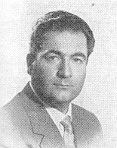

Member of the Chamber of Deputies
- In office 1958–1963

President of the Province of Pisa
- In office 1962–1970
- Preceded by: Antonino Maccarrone
- Succeeded by: Renzo Moschini

Member of the Regional Council of Tuscany
- In office 1970–1980

Regional assessor for Public Works and Roads of Tuscany
- In office 1970–1975

Regional assessor for Agriculture of Tuscany
- In office 1975–1980

Personal details
- Born: 3 February 1923 Palaia, Province of Pisa, Kingdom of Italy
- Died: 25 March 1998 (aged 75) Pisa, Tuscany, Italy
- Party: Italian Communist Party
- Occupation: Trade unionist

Anselmo Pucci (3 February 1923 – 25 March 1998) was an Italian trade unionist and politician of the Italian Communist Party. He served as a member of the Chamber of Deputies from 1958 to 1963, as president of the Province of Pisa from 1962 to 1970, and as a member of the Regional Council of Tuscany from 1970 to 1980.
