= Mia Diop =

Italian politician (born 2002)

Vice president of Tuscany
- Incumbent
- Assumed office 10 November 2025
- President: Eugenio Giani
- Preceded by: Stefania Saccardi

Personal details
- Born: Mia Bintou Diop; 3 February 2002 (age 24) Cecina, Tuscany, Italy
- Party: Democratic Party

Mia Bintou Diop (born 3 February 2002) is an Italian politician who has served as vice president of Tuscany since November 2025.

== Life and career ==
Diop was born in Cecina in 2002 and grew up in Livorno. She is the daughter of Mbaye Diop, the president of the local Senegalese community and activist of the Democratic Party, and an Italian mother.

Diop graduated from the "Niccolini Palli" classical high school in Livorno and later pursued studies in political science at the University of Pisa. She joined the Democratic Party at the age of sixteen and has been active in the party's youth wing, the Young Democrats.

In 2024, she was elected to the Livorno City Council and also became a member of the national leadership of the party.

On 10 November 2025, during the opening session of the 12th Legislature of Tuscany, Diop was appointed by president Eugenio Giani vice president of the regional government, becoming the youngest person to hold the position in the region's history. Her appointment was seen as a sign of generational renewal within the Democratic Party, particularly among those aligned with Elly Schlein's leadership. In her public statements, Diop positioned herself as a representative of Generation Z, highlighting concerns such as housing insecurity, youth precariousness, and the need for broader institutional representation.

In addition to the regional vice presidency, she was also assigned responsibilities for Peace and International Cooperation; Culture of Legality; Recovery and Requalification of Assets Seized from the Mafia; Public Participation; the Public Relations Office; Commons and Active Citizenship; Lifestyles; and Community Cooperatives.
