= Angelo Passaleva =

Italian politician (born 1933)

Member of the Regional Council of Tuscany
- In office 9 May 1990 – 14 April 2001

President of the Regional Council of Tuscany
- In office 7 June 1995 – 24 May 2000
- Preceded by: Simone Siliani
- Succeeded by: Riccardo Nencini

Vice president of Tuscany
- In office 20 May 2000 – 5 April 2005
- President: Claudio Martini
- Preceded by: Marialina Marcucci
- Succeeded by: Federico Gelli

Regional assessor of Institutional Reforms and Social Policies of Tuscany
- In office 20 May 2000 – 5 April 2005
- President: Claudio Martini

Personal details
- Born: 12 June 1933 (age 93) Turin, Kingdom of Italy
- Party: Christian Democracy; Italian People's Party
- Profession: Physician

Angelo Passaleva (born 12 June 1933) is an Italian physician and politician who served as a member of the Regional Council of Tuscany (1990–2001), president of the same council (1995–2000), regional assessor and vice president of Tuscany (2000–2005).

== Life and career ==
Born in Turin on 12 June 1933, Passaleva graduated in medicine with a specialization in allergology and clinical immunology, and settled in Florence, working as an associate professor at the Faculty of Medicine and Surgery of the University of Florence. Immediately after World War II, he was among the founders of the Catholic Center for Social Studies at Santa Maria Novella.

In the mid-1970s, he was one of the founders of the Movement for Life and the Life Aid Center. He was a member of the executive board of the Italian Society of Allergology and Clinical Immunology and a member of the regional commission for bioethics.

He entered politics in 1985, when he was elected at the City Council of Florence with the Christian Democracy party.

In 1990, Passaleva was a candidate in the Tuscan regional elections in the Florence constituency. He won with 15,802 votes e became a member of the Regional Council of Tuscany on 9 May 1990. In 1994, he joined the Italian People's Party and was re-elected as a regional councilor in the 1995 elections with 8,494 preferences. He also served as president of the council until April 2000.

In 2000, he is re-confirmed as a member of the Regional Council with 4,427 votes and was appointed vice president of the Regional Government of Tuscany, led by president Claudio Martini. He also served as assessor of institutional reforms, local authorities, social policies, childhood, youth, and family.

Passaleva retired from politics at the end of his term in 2005.
