= Oriano Ripoli =

Italian politician (1923–2019)

Mayor of Pisa
- In office 10 September 1985 – 15 July 1986
- Preceded by: Vinicio Bernardini
- Succeeded by: Giacomino Granchi

Personal details
- Born: 19 December 1923 Pisa, Kingdom of Italy
- Died: 11 October 2019 (aged 95) Pisa, Tuscany, Italy
- Party: Italian Socialist Party

Oriano Ripoli (19 December 1923 – 11 October 2019) was an Italian politician.

He was a member of the Italian Socialist Party and was elected Mayor of Pisa on 10 September 1985. He resigned and left his office on 15 July 1986 for a lack of majority.

He died in Pisa on 11 October 2019.

== See also ==
- 1985 Italian local elections
- List of mayors of Pisa

Political offices
Preceded by Vinicio Bernardini	Mayor of Pisa; 1985–1986	Succeeded by Giacomino Granchi
