= Federico Gelli =

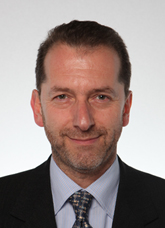

Member of the Chamber of Deputies
- In office 19 March 2013 – 22 March 2018

Vice president of Tuscany
- In office 6 May 2005 – 16 April 2010
- President: Claudio Martini
- Preceded by: Angelo Passaleva
- Succeeded by: Stella Targetti

Member of the Regional Council of Tuscany
- In office 10 May 2000 – 13 May 2005

Personal details
- Born: 25 November 1962 (age 63) Castelnuovo di Val di Cecina, Province of Pisa, Italy
- Party: Democratic Party
- Education: University of Pisa
- Profession: Physician, health manager

Federico Gelli (born 25 November 1962) is an Italian physician and politician who served as a member of the Chamber of Deputies from 2013 to 2018. He previously served as a member of the Regional Council of Tuscany (2000–2005), and as regional assessor and vice president of Tuscany (2005–2010).
