= Fidia Arata =

Italian politician and academic

Regional assessor of Tuscany
- In office 26 September 1978 – 31 May 1983
- President: Mario Leone

Member of the Regional Council of Tuscany
- In office 1970–1985

Mayor of Forte dei Marmi
- In office 6 October 1985 – 27 June 1990

Personal details
- Born: 11 March 1920 Seravezza, Province of Lucca, Kingdom of Italy
- Died: 18 February 2010 (aged 89)
- Party: Italian Socialist Party
- Profession: Philosopher, academic

Fidia Arata (11 March 1920 – 18 February 2010) was an Italian academic and politician of the Italian Socialist Party (PSI). A professor at the University of Pisa, he was among the early members of the Regional Council of Tuscany, where he served for three consecutive terms and held offices including vice president of the council and regional assessor for industry, trade, manufacturing and tourism.

== Life and career ==
Born in Seravezza, in the province of Lucca, Arata graduated in philosophy and taught at the University of Pisa. A partisan during the Resistance movement, he was disabled as a result of his service in the Italian Liberation War.

Arata held several administrative positions in the province of Lucca. He was president of the Provincial Tourism Board and a representative on the Regional Planning Committee. A member of the PSI provincial leadership in Lucca, he also served on the party's national tourism commission.

Elected to the Regional Council of Tuscany in 1970, he served as vice president of the council and chaired several committees, including those for tourism and culture. Re-elected in 1975 and 1980, he became regional assessor for industry, manufacturing, trade and tourism in 1978 and remained in that role until 1983.

Arata served as mayor of Forte dei Marmi from 1985 to 1990. He remained a member of the municipal council until August 1993, when he retired from public life.

He died on 18 February 2010 at the age of 89.
