= Tito Barbini =

Italian politician

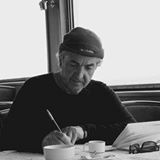

President of the Province of Arezzo
- In office 1980–1985
- Preceded by: Italo Monacchini
- Succeeded by: Franco Parigi

Member of the Regional Council of Tuscany
- In office 9 May 1990 – 17 April 2000

Regional assessor for Social welfare of Tuscany
- In office 19 July 1990 – 15 June 1993
- President: Marco Marcucci (1990–92); Vannino Chiti (1992–93)

Regional assessor for Urban planning and Transports of Tuscany
- In office 15 June 1993 – 17 April 2000
- President: Vannino Chiti

Regional assessor for Agriculture of Tuscany
- In office 20 May 2000 – 5 April 2005
- President: Claudio Martini

Personal details
- Born: 26 September 1945 (age 80) Cortona, Province of Arezzo, Kingdom of Italy
- Party: Italian Communist Party; Democratic Party of the Left
- Occupation: Writer

Tito Barbini (born 26 September 1945) is an Italian politician and writer who served as president of the Province of Arezzo from 1980 to 1985 and later as a member of the Regional Council of Tuscany and regional assessor.

== Life and career ==
Born in Cortona, Barbini was a leading member of the Italian Communist Party (PCI), serving as secretary of its provincial federation in Arezzo and as a member of the party's Central Committee. He was elected mayor of Cortona in 1970 and was re-elected in 1975 before becoming president of the Province of Arezzo in 1980.

In 1990, Barbini was elected to the Regional Council of Tuscany for the PCI and joined the regional government as assessor for social welfare. Re-elected in 1995 as a member of the Democratic Party of the Left (PDS), he served as regional assessor responsible for urban planning, transport, roads and housing. Following the 2000 regional election, he remained in the regional government as an external assessor for agriculture.

After leaving public office, Barbini gradually withdrew from active politics and devoted himself to writing. He became known as a travel writer, publishing several books based on his journeys and experiences around the world.
