= Paolo Giannarelli =

Italian politician and educator

Vice president of Tuscany
- In office 20 October 1992 – 15 June 1993
- President: Vannino Chiti
- Preceded by: Giacomino Granchi
- Succeeded by: Giovanni Fratini

Member of the Regional Council of Tuscany
- In office 29 May 1990 – 17 April 2000

Mayor of Seravezza
- In office 1980 – 5 July 1990

Personal details
- Born: 11 June 1944 (age 82) Seravezza, Province of Lucca, Kingdom of Italy
- Party: Italian Socialist Party; Labour Federation
- Education: University of Pisa
- Occupation: Teacher

Paolo Giannarelli (born 11 June 1944) is an Italian politician who served as a member of the Regional Council of Tuscany (1990–2000) and as vice president of Tuscany (1992–1993).

== Life and career ==
A member of the Italian Socialist Party (PSI), he served as mayor of Seravezza from 1980 to 1990 and was elected to the Regional Council of Tuscany in 1990 and 1995.

During his first term in regional government, Giannarelli served as regional assessor for culture, education and universities until June 1993. From 20 October 1992 to 15 June 1993, he was vice president of Tuscany. Following his re-election in 1995 on the "Toscana Democratica" list, he served as regional assessor for European community policies, institutional reform and relations with local authorities.

From 2000 to 2004, Giannarelli served as a municipal assessor in Certaldo.

Giannarelli was also active in cultural institutions in Tuscany, serving on the boards of the Teatro Comunale di Firenze and the Regional Park of the Apuan Alps. In 2017, he was appointed president of the Croce Bianca association of Querceta.
