= Renzo Moschini =

Italian politician and environmental expert (born 1935)

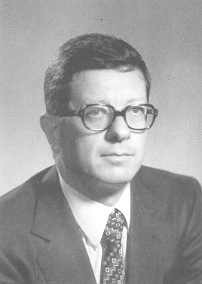

Member of the Chamber of Deputies
- In office 1976–1987

President of the Province of Pisa
- In office 1970–1976
- Preceded by: Anselmo Pucci
- Succeeded by: Gioiello Orsini

Personal details
- Born: 11 May 1935 (age 91) Pisa, Kingdom of Italy
- Party: Italian Communist Party

Renzo Moschini (born 11 May 1935) is an Italian politician, writer and environmental expert. He served as president of the Province of Pisa from 1970 to 1976 and as a member of the Chamber of Deputies from 1976 to 1987.
