= Guido Biondi =

Italian politician, trade unionist and anti-fascist

Regional assessor for Healthcare and Social welfare of Tuscany
- In office 28 July 1970 – 28 July 1975

Regional assessor for General affairs and personnel of Tuscany
- In office 14 September 1979 – 29 July 1980
- In office 31 May 1983 – 13 August 1985

Member of the Regional Council of Tuscany
- In office 1970–1985

Personal details
- Born: 6 February 1927 Trento, Kingdom of Italy
- Died: 9 May 1997 (aged 70) Florence, Italy
- Party: Italian Socialist Party; Italian Socialist Party of Proletarian Unity; Italian Communist Party

Guido Biondi (6 February 1927 – 9 May 1997) was an Italian politician, trade unionist and anti-fascist. A former partisan and survivor of the Bolzano Transit Camp, he served three terms in the Regional Council of Tuscany and held several positions in the Tuscan regional government.

== Life and career ==
Born in Trento, Biondi moved with his family to Verona in 1929. During the Italian resistance movement he joined a partisan formation and was arrested in 1944. He was deported to the Bolzano Transit Camp, where he was registered as prisoner no. 5258.

After the war he settled in Florence and became active in the trade union movement, serving as the local secretary of the Italian General Confederation of Labour (CGIL) from 1954 to 1963. He was a member of the central committee of the Italian Socialist Party and later held leading positions in the Italian Socialist Party of Proletarian Unity (PSIUP).

Biondi was a member of the Florence City Council from 1966 to 1967. In 1970 he was elected to the Regional Council of Tuscany, serving as regional assessor for healthcare and social welfare during the first regional legislature. Re-elected in 1975 and 1980, he later served as vice president of the council and returned to the regional executive in 1983. During his final term he sat with the Independent Left group.

Biondi died in Florence on 9 May 1997.

== Sources ==
- Carlesi, Simona; Gurrieri, Tommaso (2009). Guido Biondi. Un uomo, un'idea. Florence: Polistampa.
- Gianfagna, Andrea, ed. (2020). Gli uomini e le donne della CGIL: Le Segreterie confederali, delle Federazioni nazionali di categoria, delle CGIL regionali, delle Camere del Lavoro (PDF) (3rd ed.). Rome: Ediesse.
- Venegoni, Dario (2005). Uomini, donne e bambini nel lager di Bolzano. Milan: Mimesis.
