= 1995 Lazio regional election =

- 23 April 1995

All 60 seats to the Regional Council of Lazio
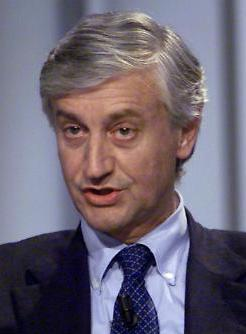

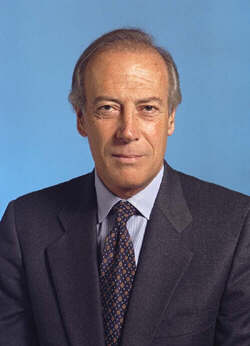
	Majority party	Minority party
Leader	Piero Badaloni	Alberto Michelini
Party	Independent	Forza Italia
Alliance	Centre-left	Centre-right
Seats won	37	23
Popular vote	1,582,897	1,577,521
Percentage	48.1%	48.0%
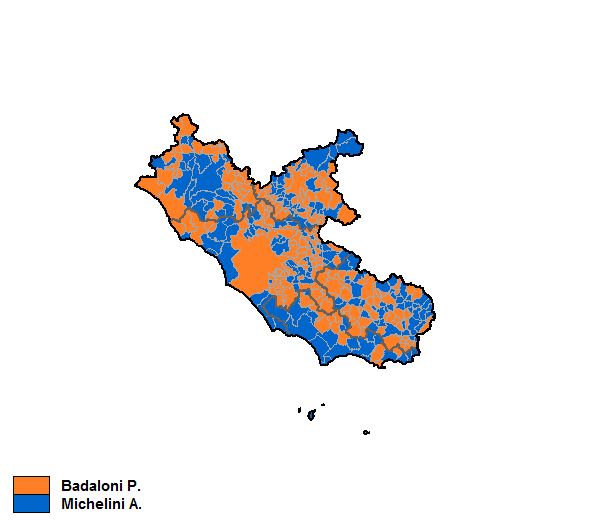
President of Lazio before election
Arturo Osio
Greens
President of Lazio
Piero Badaloni
Independent

The Lazio regional election of 1995 took place on 23 April 1995.

For the first time the President of the Region was directly elected by the people, although the election was not yet binding and the President-elect could have been replaced during the term.

Piero Badaloni (an independent close to the Italian People's Party) was elected President of the region, defeating Alberto Michelini (Forza Italia) by a narrow margin.

== Results ==
23 April 1995 Lazio regional election results
Candidates	Votes	%	Seats	Parties	Votes	%	Seats
Piero Badaloni	1,582,897	48.14	12				
Piero Badaloni	1,582,897	48.14	12	Democratic Party of the Left	763,077	27.24	14
Piero Badaloni	1,582,897	48.14	12	Communist Refoundation Party	258,336	9.22	4
Piero Badaloni	1,582,897	48.14	12	Populars–Pact of Democrats–Liberals	167,518	5.98	3
Piero Badaloni	1,582,897	48.14	12	Federation of the Greens	100,211	3.58	2
Piero Badaloni	1,582,897	48.14	12	Italian Republican Party	31,355	1.12	1
Piero Badaloni	1,582,897	48.14	12	Italian Democratic Socialist Party–Labour Federation	30,823	1.10	1
Piero Badaloni	1,582,897	48.14	12	Federal Italy League	13,516	0.48	–
Piero Badaloni	1,582,897	48.14	12	Total	1,364,836	48.72	25
Alberto Michelini	1,577,521	47.97	–				
Alberto Michelini	1,577,521	47.97	–	National Alliance	687,061	24.52	12
Alberto Michelini	1,577,521	47.97	–	Forza Italia – The People's Pole	530,860	18.95	9
Alberto Michelini	1,577,521	47.97	–	Christian Democratic Centre	117,329	4.19	2
Alberto Michelini	1,577,521	47.97	–	Total	1,335,250	47.66	23
Primo Mastrantoni	73,654	2.24	–				
Primo Mastrantoni	73,654	2.24	–	Pannella List	35,536	1.27	–
Primo Mastrantoni	73,654	2.24	–	The Left of Freedoms	14,785	0.53	–
Primo Mastrantoni	73,654	2.24	–	Federalist Greens	13,259	0.47	–
Primo Mastrantoni	73,654	2.24	–	Total	63,580	2.27	–
Pino Rauti	54,275	1.65	–	Tricolour Flame	37,869	1.35	–
Total candidates	3,288,347	100.00	12	Total parties	2,801,535	100.00	48
Source: Ministry of the Interior
