= Riccardo Nencini =

Italian politician

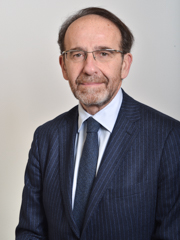

Member of the Senate
- In office 15 March 2013 – 13 October 2022
- Constituency: Arezzo (XVIII)

Secretary of Italian Socialist Party
- In office 6 July 2008 – 31 March 2019
- Preceded by: Enrico Boselli
- Succeeded by: Enzo Maraio

Deputy Minister of Infrastructure and Transport
- In office 28 February 2014 – 1 June 2019
- Prime Minister: Matteo Renzi; Paolo Gentiloni

President of the Regional Council of Tuscany
- In office 24 May 2000 – 23 April 2010
- Preceded by: Angelo Passaleva
- Succeeded by: Alberto Monaci

Member of the European Parliament
- In office 1994–1999
- Constituency: Central Italy

Member of the Chamber of Deputies
- In office 23 April 1992 – 14 April 1994
- Constituency: Florence-Pistoia (XI)

Personal details
- Born: 19 October 1959 (age 66) Barberino di Mugello, Italy
- Party: PSI (until 1994); SI (1995–2007); SDI (1995–2007); PSI (since 2007)
- Education: University of Florence; University of Leicester
- Profession: Politician, Journalist
- Website: www.riccardonencini.it

Riccardo Nencini (born 19 October 1959) is an Italian politician.

Nencini was born at Barberino di Mugello, in the province of Florence. He is the nephew of professional cyclist Gastone Nencini, winner of the 1960 Tour de France. A long-time member of the Italian Socialist Party (PSI), he joined the Italian Socialists (SI) in 1994 and the Italian Democratic Socialists (SDI) in 1998.

From 1994 to 1999 he was member of the European Parliament. From 2000 to 2010 he was president of the Regional Council of Tuscany.

On 5 July 2008 he became secretary of the Italian Socialist Party.

In 2013 Nencini was elected to the Chamber of Deputies among the ranks of the Democratic Party. From 28 February 2014 to 1 June 2018 he served as deputy minister of infrastructure and transport in the governments led by Matteo Renzi and Paolo Gentiloni.

In the 2018 general election he was elected senator in the uninominal constituency of Arezzo.

In 2019 he left the office of PSI secretary and was appointed president of the party.
