= Loretta Montemaggi =

Italian politician (1930–2007)

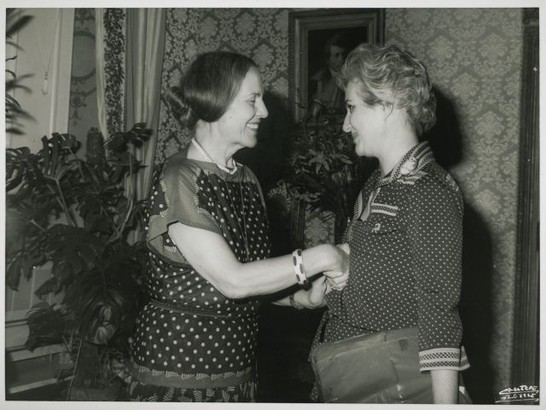
- Montemaggi (right) with President of the Chamber of Deputies Nilde Iotti in 1979

Member of the Regional Council of Tuscany
- In office 1970–1985

President of the Regional Council of Tuscany
- In office 21 July 1975 – 25 October 1983
- Preceded by: Elio Gabbuggiani
- Succeeded by: Giacomo Maccheroni

Personal details
- Born: 11 May 1930 Poggibonsi, Tuscany, Kingdom of Italy
- Died: 17 January 2007 (aged 76) Florence, Tuscany, Italy
- Party: Italian Communist Party
- Spouse: Silvano Sandonnini (m. 1954)
- Children: 1
- Occupation: Politician
- Profession: Public manager

Loretta Montemaggi (11 May 1930 – 17 January 2007) was an Italian politician who served as a member of the Regional Council of Tuscany (1970–1985) and president of the same council (1975–1983).

== Life and career ==
Loretta Montemaggi was born in Poggibonsi to Inigo Montemaggi and Caterina Bardotti. Following her family's relocation to Pontassieve in 1939, her father was employed at the Del Vivo glassworks. Raised in an antifascist environment, during the war years she came into contact with writings on communism. During the conflict, she was displaced to Volognano and, clandestinely, expressed her intention to join the Italian Communist Party (PCI), obtaining her membership card in 1944 at only fourteen years of age, becoming the youngest member of the Florence Federation.

In 1954, she married Silvano Sandonnini and had a daughter, Mirella, in 1956. In the early years of her activism, she dedicated herself to the PCI section of Pontassieve, developing an interest in women's issues and emancipation. From 1946, she participated in the Associazione Ragazze d'Italia, and from 1948 onwards, held responsibilities within the party and the Union of Italian Women (UDI), focusing on the conditions of female workers.

In the 1950s, she worked within the Press and Propaganda section of the PCI, and from 1959 to 1964, served as head of the Women's Commission. She declined parliamentary candidacies in 1958 and later chose to continue her political activities at regional and local levels. In 1960, she was elected to the Florence City Council during Giorgio La Pira's administration, and in 1965, she became a provincial councilor, holding roles as assessor for education and social assistance.

She participated in the early regional legislatures of Tuscany, elected in 1970 as one of two women in the Regional Council, and re-elected in 1975 with an increased number of preferences. During the first legislature (1970–1975), she contributed to drafting the regional statute and chaired the Culture and Health Committees. In the second legislature (1975–1980), Montemaggi became the first woman president of a Regional Council in Italy. She was re-elected for a third term in 1980, continuing to serve as President of the Regional Council until October 1983. After her term in the council ended, she was appointed president of the first Regional Commission for Equal Opportunities, established in 1987, a position she maintained until 1993.

Montemaggi died in Florence on 17 January 2007.
