= Alberto Michelini =

Italian journalist and politician

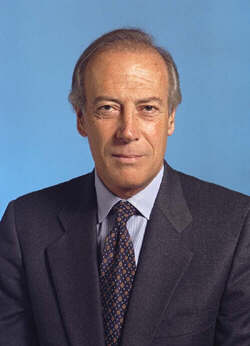

Member of the Chamber of Deputies
- In office 2 July 1987 – 27 April 2006

Member of the European Parliament
- In office 17 June 1984 – 12 June 1994

Personal details
- Born: 25 July 1941 (age 85) Rome, Italy
- Party: DC (until 1994); Segni Pact (1994); FI (1995-2006)
- Education: Sapienza University of Rome
- Occupation: Journalist, politician

Alberto Michelini (born 25 July 1941) is an Italian journalist and politician, former Deputy and Member of the European Parliament.

== Biography ==
Michelini began his journalistic career in the late 1970s as a host and special correspondent for the RAI news programme TG1. He was one of the first to interview Pope John Paul II and later wrote ten books about his pontificate. In 1981, Michelini, as correspondent in the Vatican City, documented the Pope John Paul II assassination attempt.

An expert on Vatican history, Michelini joined the Christian Democrats (DC), and was elected to the European Parliament in 1984 and 1989, and to the Chamber of Deputies in 1987 and 1992.

In 1994, Michelini was re-elected to the Chamber of Deputies with the Segni Pact, but left the party after a few months. The following year, he joined Silvio Berlusconi's Forza Italia (FI) and became the Pole for Freedoms candidate for the Presidency of Lazio at the 1995 regional election, but was defeated by the Olive Tree candidate (and Michelini's former colleague) Piero Badaloni.

In 2006, Michelini left Forza Italia due to his refusal to support the candidacy of Gianni Alemanno as Mayor of Rome, giving his support instead to the incumbent Mayor Walter Veltroni.
