= Paolo Benelli =

Italian politician

President of the Regional Council of Tuscany
- In office 28 June 1990 – 8 June 1993
- Preceded by: Enzo Pezzati
- Succeeded by: Simone Siliani

Member of the Regional Council of Tuscany
- In office 1980 – 5 March 1994
- In office 21 April 1994 – 1995

Vice president of Tuscany
- In office 6 August 1985 – 10 July 1990
- Preceded by: Gianfranco Bartolini
- Succeeded by: Alberto Magnolfi

Regional assessor for Budget and Finance of Tuscany
- In office 13 August 1985 – 26 May 1987

Regional assessor for Healthcare of Tuscany
- In office 26 May 1987 – 10 July 1990

Personal details
- Born: 17 October 1939 Rome, Kingdom of Italy
- Died: 14 April 2010 (aged 70) Florence, Italy
- Party: Italian Socialist Party

Paolo Benelli (17 October 1939 – 14 April 2010) was an Italian politician of the Italian Socialist Party (PSI). He served as a member of the Regional Council of Tuscany from 1980 to 1995, as president of the council from 1990 to 1993, and as regional assessor of Tuscany.

== Life and career ==
Born in Rome and resident in Florence, Benelli graduated in law and was a member of the PSI Central Committee and regional secretary of the party. From 1975 to 1979, he was deputy mayor of Prato in the administration led by Goffredo Lohengrin Landini.

Benelli was elected to the Regional Council of Tuscany in 1980, 1985 and 1990. Between 1985 and 1990 he served as vice-president of the Regional Government of Tuscany and regional assessor for Budget (1985–1987) and later for Healthcare (1987–1990). In 1990 he was elected president of the Regional Council of Tuscany, a position he held until June 1993.

In 1994, Benelli was arrested as part of an investigation into alleged bribery related to a pharmaceutical supply contract. He was convicted at first instance, but was acquitted on appeal on 12 March 2001, with the court finding that no offence had been committed.

He died in Florence on 14 April 2010, aged 70.
