= Piero Angelini =

Italian politician (1936–2024)

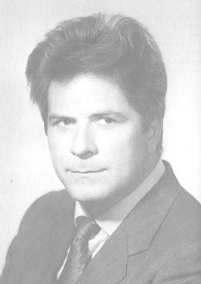
- Angelini in 1980

Member of the Chamber of Deputies
- In office 8 July 1983 – 14 April 1994
- Constituency: Pisa

Member of the Regional Council of Tuscany
- In office 1975 – 24 May 1983

Personal details
- Born: Piero Mario Angelini; 22 January 1936 Lucca, Italy
- Died: 25 September 2024 (aged 88)
- Party: DC; PPI
- Occupation: Lawyer

Piero Mario Angelini (22 January 1936 – 25 September 2024) was an Italian lawyer and politician. A member of Christian Democracy and the Italian People's Party, he served in the Chamber of Deputies from 1983 to 1994.

Angelini died on 25 September 2024, at the age of 88.
