= Emo Bonifazi =

Italian politician (1925–2013)

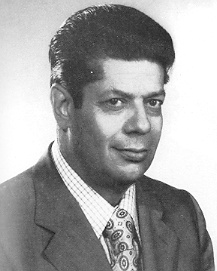

Member of the Chamber of Deputies
- In office 5 June 1968 – 19 June 1979

Personal details
- Born: 25 December 1925 Pienza, Province of Siena, Kingdom of Italy
- Died: 18 March 2013 (aged 87) Siena, Tuscany, Italy
- Party: Italian Communist Party
- Profession: Trade unionist

Emo Bonifazi (25 December 1925 – 18 March 2013) was an Italian politician who served as a deputy for three legislatures from 1968 to 1979.
