= Giuseppe Torri =

Italian politician

Giuseppe Torri, also known as Pippo Torri, is a Lombard far-left politician.

A member of the Regional Council of Lombardy for Proletarian Democracy since 1985, he worked at university level for the Italian Confederation of Workers' Trade Unions. In 1995, he received the nomination for the presidency of the region by the Communist Refoundation Party. He lost, receiving only 8% of the votes.
