= Giuseppe Matulli =

Italian politician (1938–2024)

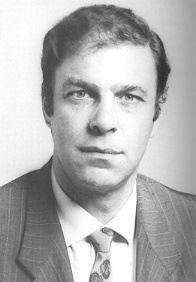
- Matulli in 1990

Member of the Chamber of Deputies
- In office 2 July 1987 – 14 April 1994
- Constituency: Constituency Florence-Pistoia

Member of the Regional Council of Tuscany
- In office 1970–1975
- In office 17 April 1979 – 14 May 1987

Personal details
- Born: 5 December 1938 Marradi, Italy
- Died: 11 February 2024 (aged 85) Florence, Italy
- Party: DC
- Education: University of Florence
- Occupation: Researcher

Giuseppe Matulli (5 December 1938 – 11 February 2024) was an Italian researcher and politician. A member of Christian Democracy, he served in the Chamber of Deputies from 1987 to 1994.

Matulli died in Florence on 11 February 2024, at the age of 85.
