= Giacomo Maccheroni =

Italian politician (1936–2024)

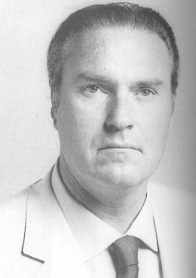
- Maccheroni in 1992

President of the Regional Council of Tuscany
- In office 25 October 1983 – 26 May 1987
- Preceded by: Loretta Montemaggi
- Succeeded by: Claudio Alvaro Carosi

Member of the Chamber of Deputies of Italy for Pisa
- In office 2 July 1987 – 14 April 1994

Personal details
- Born: 1 August 1936 Pontedera, Italy
- Died: 10 October 2024 (aged 88) Pontedera, Italy
- Party: PSI

Giacomo Maccheroni (1 August 1936 – 10 October 2024) was an Italian politician. A member of the Italian Socialist Party, he served as president of the Regional Council of Tuscany from 1983 to 1987 and was a member of the Chamber of Deputies from 1987 to 1994.

Maccheroni died in Pontedera on 10 October 2024, at the age of 88.

== Biography ==
The son and grandson of long-time socialist activists from Pontedera, he joined the Italian Socialist Party in 1950 after completing middle school. From 1958 to 1961, he served as president of the “Lotti” Hospital in Pontedera. A city councilor in Pontedera from 1960 to 1965, he later became a provincial councilor in Province of Pisa. As mayor of Pontedera from 1965 to 1975, he navigated the city through its most difficult period following the 1966 flood. As mayor and head of urban planning, he was called upon to manage the extremely delicate phase of the construction boom in the city of Pontedera, whose urban fabric grew in a disorderly manner, with negative consequences in terms of traffic congestion, a lack of green spaces, and imbalances in the use of built-up areas.

As president of the Tuscan branch of ANCI, he served on the regional executive committee of the Tuscan PSI and on the Pisa PSI federation.

In the 1975 regional elections, he was elected and subsequently served on the Regional Council as the councilor for urban planning. Re-elected in 1980, he continued to serve as councilor for urban planning until November 1983. In 1985, he was re-elected to the regional council, where he served as President of the Regional Council. He remained in office until May 1987, when he resigned to run in the general election, in which he was subsequently elected. He served in the Chamber of Deputies for two terms, until 1994.

He was sentenced to 3 years and 5 months in prison for extortion and fraud in 2001.

Maccheroni wrote his own political autobiography.

He died in Pontedera on October 10, 2024, at the age of 88.
