= 1985 Tuscan regional election =

← 1980	12 May 1985	1990 →
- All 50 seats to the Regional Council of Tuscany
Party	Vote %	Seats	+/–
PCI	46.2%	25	0
DC	26.6%	14	−1
PSI	12.0%	5	0
MSI	4.6%	2	+1
PRI	3.3%	1	0
PSDI	1.7%	1	0
Green List	1.6%	1	New
DP	1.5%	1	0
This lists parties that won seats. See the complete results below.
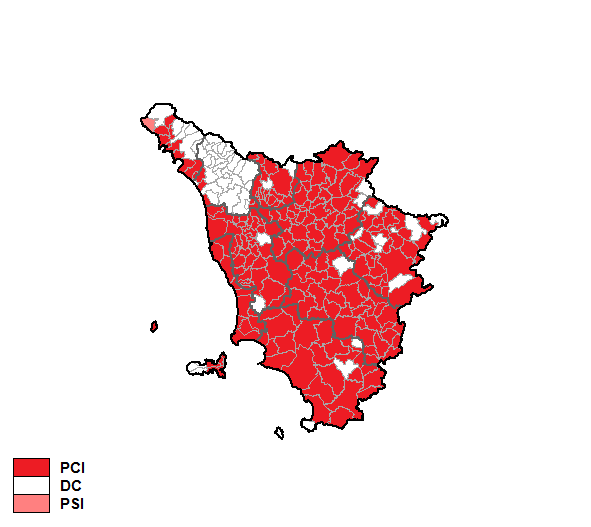
Major party in each municipality.

Tuscan regional election of 1985 took place on 12 May 1985.

== Electoral law ==
Election was held under proportional representation with provincial constituencies where the largest remainder method with a Droop quota was used. To ensure more proportionality, remained votes and seats were transferred at regional level and calculated at-large.

== Results ==
The Italian Communist Party was by far the largest party. After the election Gianfranco Bartolini, the incumbent Communist President of the Region, formed a new government with the support of the Italian Socialist Party and the Italian Democratic Socialist Party.

Parties	votes	votes (%)	seats
Italian Communist Party	1,183,428	46.2	25
Christian Democracy	679,986	26.6	14
Italian Socialist Party	306,797	12.0	5
Italian Social Movement	118,420	4.6	2
Italian Republican Party	84,725	3.3	1
Italian Democratic Socialist Party	43,810	1.7	1
Green List	41,281	1.6	1
Proletarian Democracy	37,098	1.5	1
Italian Liberal Party	28,863	1.1	-
Pensioners Italian Alliance – Venetian League	11,798	0.5	-
Hunting – Fishing – Environment	10,797	0.4	-
Pensioners' National Party	8,234	0.3	-
Valdostan Union – Democratic Party – others	4,208	0.2	-
Humanist Party	1,027	0.0	-
Total	2,560,472	100.0	50

Source: Ministry of the Interior
