= Enzo Pezzati =

Italian politician

President of the Regional Council of Tuscany
- In office 18 December 1987 – 28 June 1990
- Preceded by: Claudio Alvaro Carosi
- Succeeded by: Paolo Benelli

Member of the Regional Council of Tuscany
- In office 1970–1990

Personal details
- Born: 10 June 1926 Florence, Kingdom of Italy
- Died: 19 March 2005 (aged 78) Florence, Italy
- Party: Christian Democracy
- Occupation: Corporate executive

Enzo Pezzati (10 June 1926 – 19 March 2005) was an Italian politician who served as a member of the Regional Council of Tuscany in the first four terms (1970–1990) and as president of the same council from 1987 to 1990.

== Life and career ==
Born in Florence, Pezzati graduated in mathematical sciences and worked as a corporate executive. He later held senior roles in the healthcare sector, including president of the Arcispedale di Santa Maria Nuova in Florence and of the regional association of Tuscan hospitals. He was also secretary of the provincial branch of the Christian Democracy (DC) in Florence between 1977 and 1979.

Pezzati was elected to the Regional Council of Tuscany four times, serving continuously from 1970 to 1990. He first entered the council in the 1970 Tuscan regional election, and was subsequently re-elected in 1975, 1980, and 1985. During his mandate he held several institutional roles, including vice-president of the Regional Council (1975–1979), secretary of the health and social security committee, and president of the DC group in the assembly. From December 1987 to the end of his tenure he served as president of the Regional Council of Tuscany.

He died in Florence on 19 March 2005, aged 78.
