= Diego Masi =

Italian entrepreneur and politician

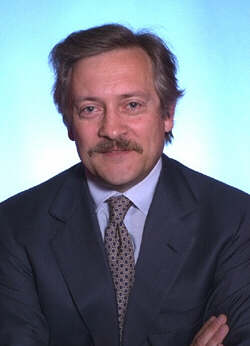
Diego Masi

Diego Masi (Cremona, February 11, 1947) is an Italian entrepreneur and politician.

Masi was city councillor in Milan as part of Christian Democracy. He left this party in 1992, when he followed Mariotto Segni. He was elected for Parliament in the proportional share for the small centre party. He pursued the opposition to the Berlusconi government positions from the centre and subsequently, with the Pact, he was a promoter of the alliance of centre-left The Olive Tree. In 1995, he was a candidate for President of Lombardy Region, supported by the whole centre-left (excluding PRC), but he was defeated by the centre-right candidate, Roberto Formigoni.

At the elections of 1996, he was elected under the coalition of The Olive Tree as a member of the Dini List - Italian Renewal, which had merged with The Pact. He became leader of the Italian Renewal in the Chamber of Deputies. In the D'alema government he was appointed Vice-Minister of Internal Affairs for Immigrations. However, he distanced himself from the centre and the Government and adhered to the Pole for Freedoms. He left politics in 2001.

In 1972, he founded the marketing agency Promotions Italia, where he was president from 1972 until 2009 when the agency became part of WPP group. From 2005 to 2008 he was Vice-president of J. W. Thompson and president of Rmg-Connect, on behalf of WPP Italian Group. In 2008 he founded the marketing company PromoDigital. He was chairman of PromoDigital until April 2010, when the company was sold to Teads.
