= Gianfranco Bartolini =

Italian politician (1927–1992)

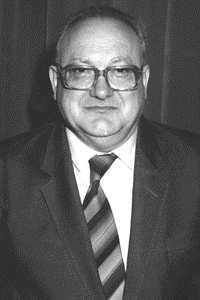

President of Tuscany
- In office 31 May 1983 – 10 July 1990
- Preceded by: Mario Leone
- Succeeded by: Marco Marcucci

Vice president of Tuscany
- In office 28 July 1975 – 31 May 1983
- Preceded by: Walter Malvezzi
- Succeeded by: Paolo Benelli

Member of the Regional Council of Tuscany
- In office June 1975 – 21 March 1990

Personal details
- Born: 17 January 1927 Fiesole, Province of Florence, Kingdom of Italy
- Died: 10 October 1992 (aged 65) Florence, Tuscany, Italy
- Party: Italian Communist Party
- Occupation: Trade unionist, public manager

Gianfranco Bartolini (17 January 1927 – 10 October 1992) was an Italian trade unionist and politician who fought in the Italian Resistance, and served as a member of the Regional Council of Tuscany (1975–1990) and president of Tuscany (1983–1990).
