= Paolo Bartolozzi =

Italian politician (1957–2021)

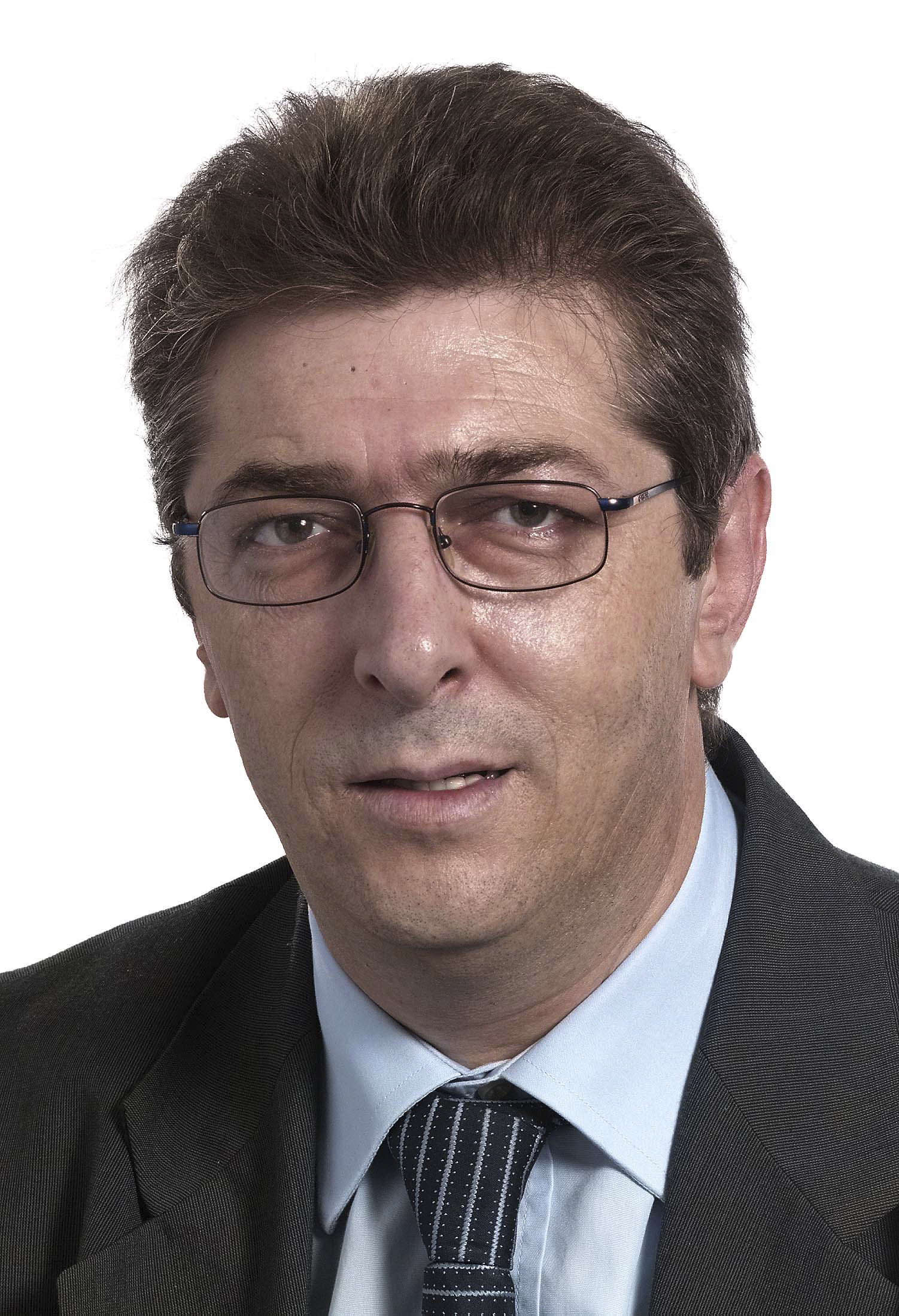
Bartolozzi in 1999

Paolo Bartolozzi (12 September 1957 – 4 February 2021) was an Italian politician who served as a MEP.
