= 1990 Tuscan regional election =

← 1985	6–7 May 1990	1995 →
- All 50 seats to the Regional Council of Tuscany
Party	Vote %	Seats	+/–
PCI	39.8%	22	−3
DC	25.9%	14	0
PSI	13.6%	6	+1
Greens	3.8%	2	+1
PRI	3.5%	1	0
MSI	3.3%	1	−1
CPA	3.3%	1	+1
PSDI	1.6%	1	0
DP	1.1%	1	0
PLI	1.0%	1	+1
This lists parties that won seats. See the complete results below.
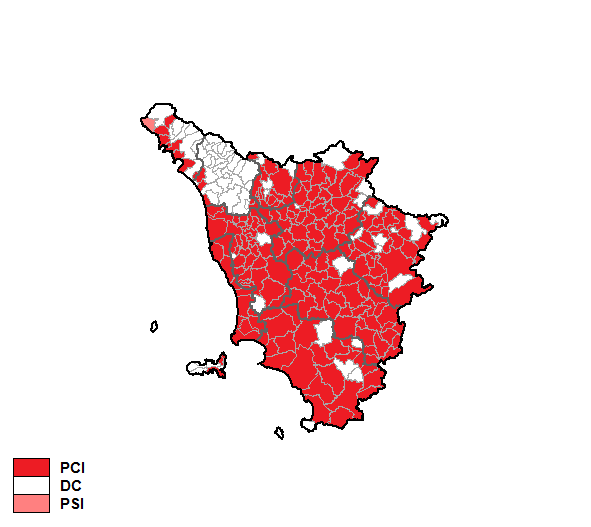
Major party in each municipality.

The Tuscan regional election of 1990 took place on 6 and 7 May 1990.

== Electoral law ==
Election was held under proportional representation with provincial constituencies where the largest remainder method with a Droop quota was used. To ensure more proportionality, remained votes and seats were transferred at regional level and calculated at-large.

== Results ==
The Italian Communist Party was by far the largest party, but lost many votes from five years before. After the election Communist Marco Marcucci formed a government comprising the Italian Socialist Party and the Italian Democratic Socialist Party. In 1992 Vannino Chiti took over from Marcucci and the centre-right Italian Liberal Party joined the government.

Parties	votes	votes (%)	seats
Italian Communist Party	986,513	39.8	22
Christian Democracy	642,623	25.9	14
Italian Socialist Party	337,719	13.6	6
Greens (Green List + Rainbow Greens)	85,784	3.8	2
Italian Republican Party	85,784	3.5	1
Italian Social Movement	82,295	3.3	1
Hunting – Fishing – Environment	76,202	3.1	1
Italian Democratic Socialist Party	39,863	1.6	1
Proletarian Democracy	26,805	1.1	1
Italian Liberal Party	25,872	1.0	1
Antiprohibitionists on Drugs	24,024	1.0	-
Greens Progress	20,692	0.8	-
Northern League Tuscany	20,657	0.8	-
Pensioners' List	11,753	0.5	-
Local list	3.420	0.1	-
Total	2,478,167	100.0	50

Source: Ministry of the Interior
