= 1995 Tuscan regional election =

Italian regional election

- 23 April 1995

All 50 seats to the Regional Council
- Turnout: 85.2% (▼4.4%)
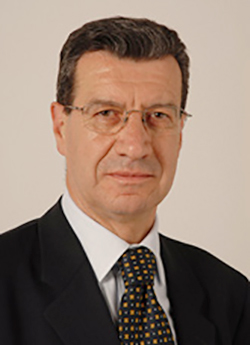

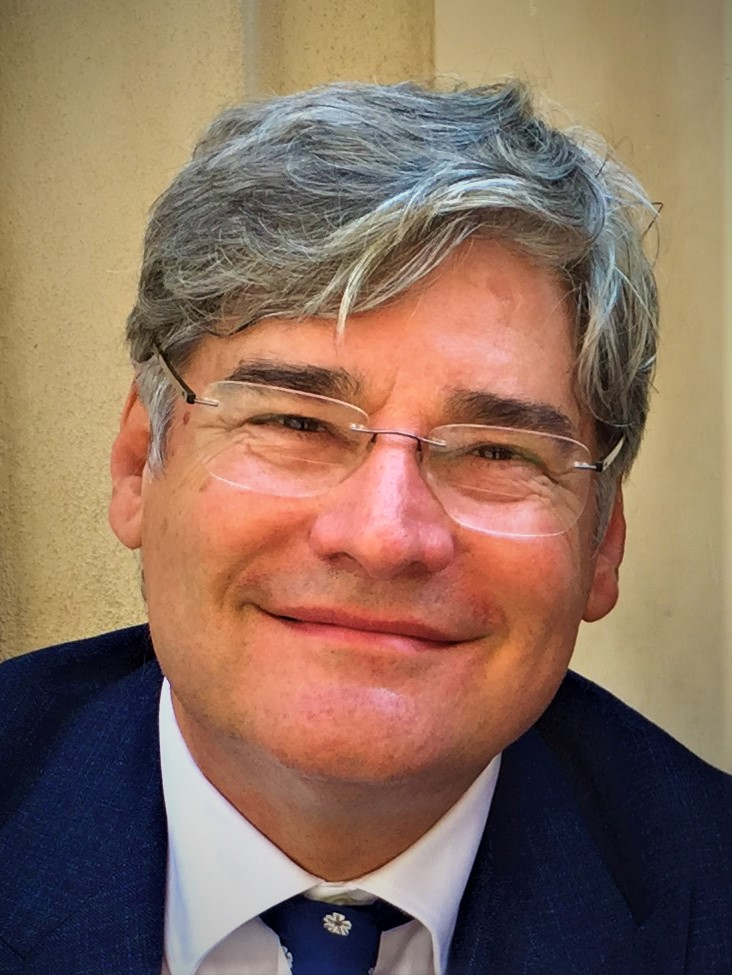
	Majority party	Minority party
Leader	Vannino Chiti	Paolo Del Debbio
Party	PDS	Forza Italia
Alliance	Centre-left	Centre-right
Seats won	33	13
Popular vote	1,188,995	855,287
Percentage	50.1%	36.1%
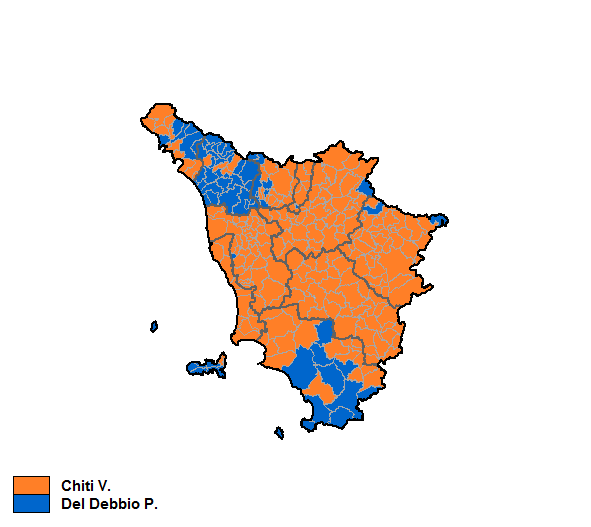
President of Tuscany before election
Vannino Chiti
PDS
President of Tuscany
Vannino Chiti
PDS

The Tuscan regional election of 1995 was one of the 1995 Italian regional elections. It took place on 23 April 1995. Vannino Chiti was elected president of the region of Tuscany, heading the centre-left coalition. Under new electoral laws, this was the first election in which the regional president was directly elected by the people.

== Electoral system ==
For the 1995 election year, regional elections in Tuscany were governed by the "Tatarella Law". This law provided for a mixed electoral system: four-fifths of regional councilors were elected in provincial constituencies by proportional representation, using the largest remainder method with a droop quota and open lists. The residual votes and unassigned seats were grouped into a single regional constituency, where the whole ratios and the highest remainders were divided using the Hare method among the provincial party lists. One-fifth of council seats were reserved for regional lists and assigned with a majoritarian system; the leader of the regional list that scored the highest number of votes was elected to the presidency of the region, while the other candidates were elected as regional councilors.

A threshold of 3% had been established for the provincial lists, which, however, could still have entered the regional council if the regional list to which they were connected had scored at least 5% of valid votes.

Panachage was also allowed: a voter could indicate a candidate for the presidency but prefer a provincial list connected to another candidate.

== Parties and candidates ==
Political party or alliance	Constituent lists	Previous result		Candidate
Political party or alliance	Constituent lists	Votes (%)	Seats	Candidate
Centre-left coalition	Democratic Party of the Left	39.8	22	Vannino Chiti
Centre-left coalition	Populars – Democrats – Liberals	26.9	15	Vannino Chiti
Centre-left coalition	Federation of the Greens	3.8	2	Vannino Chiti
Centre-left coalition	Italian Republican Party	3.5	1	Vannino Chiti
Centre-left coalition	Northern League Tuscany	0.8	–	Vannino Chiti
Centre-left coalition	Labour Federation	—N/a	—N/a	Vannino Chiti
Centre-right coalition	National Alliance	3.3	1	Paolo Del Debbio
Centre-right coalition	Forza Italia – The People's Pole	—N/a	—N/a	Paolo Del Debbio
Centre-right coalition	Christian Democratic Centre	—N/a	—N/a	Paolo Del Debbio
Pannella List		1.0	–	Vincenzo Donvito
Communist Refoundation Party		—N/a	—N/a	Luciano Ghelli

== Results ==
The election resulted in the success of a broad leftist coalition, grouping progressive ex–Christian Democrats, ex-socialists, ex-communists, and greens, and led to the regional presidency of Vannino Chiti that, with the majority premium, was able to give life to the first council in the history of the region that managed to last the entire legislature.

23 April 1995 Tuscan regional election results
Candidates	Votes	%	Seats	Parties	Votes	%	Seats
Vannino Chiti	1,188,995	50.12	10				
Vannino Chiti	1,188,995	50.12	10	Democratic Party of the Left	874,463	40.90	19
Vannino Chiti	1,188,995	50.12	10	Populars–Democrats–Liberals	135,895	6.35	2
Vannino Chiti	1,188,995	50.12	10	Federation of the Greens	57,666	2.70	1
Vannino Chiti	1,188,995	50.12	10	Labour Federation	30,204	1.41	1
Vannino Chiti	1,188,995	50.12	10	Italian Republican Party	16,395	0.77	–
Vannino Chiti	1,188,995	50.12	10	Northern League Tuscany	15,049	0.70	–
Vannino Chiti	1,188,995	50.12	10	Total	1,129,672	52.81	23
Paolo Del Debbio	855,287	36.05	–				
Paolo Del Debbio	855,287	36.05	–	Forza Italia – The People's Pole	409,266	19.13	7
Paolo Del Debbio	855,287	36.05	–	National Alliance	281,298	13.15	5
Paolo Del Debbio	855,287	36.05	–	Christian Democratic Centre	53,291	2.49	1
Paolo Del Debbio	855,287	36.05	–	Total	743,855	34.77	13
Luciano Ghelli	294,128	12.40	–	Communist Refoundation Party	237,405	11.10	4
Vincenzo Donvito	33,856	1.43	–	Pannella List	28,295	1.32	–
Total candidates	2,372,266	100.00	10	Total parties	2,139,227	100.00	40
Source: Ministry of the Interior – Historical Archive of Elections

== See also ==
- 1995 Italian regional elections
