= Marco Marcucci =

Italian politician (born 1949)

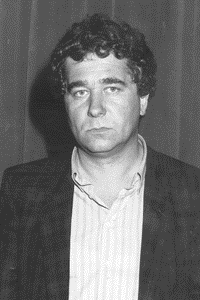

President of Tuscany
- In office 10 July 1990 – 11 January 1992
- Preceded by: Gianfranco Bartolini
- Succeeded by: Vannino Chiti

Member of the Regional Council of Tuscany
- In office June 1980 – 24 April 1995

Mayor of Viareggio
- In office 14 December 1998 – 29 April 2008
- Preceded by: Marco Costa
- Succeeded by: Luca Lunardini

Personal details
- Born: 16 June 1949 (age 77) Viareggio, Province of Lucca, Italy
- Party: Italian Communist Party; Democratic Party of the Left; Democrats of the Left

Marco Marcucci (born 16 June 1949) is an Italian politician who served as a member of the Regional Council of Tuscany (1980–1995), president of Tuscany (1990–1992), and mayor of Viareggio (1998–2008).

== Life and career ==
After earning his high school diploma, he joined the Italian Communist Party (PCI) and served as secretary of the PCI's provincial federation in Lucca from 1975 to 1979. In 1983, he served as regional councilor for the environment for the Tuscany region, and in 1990 he was elected president of the region. In 1991, he joined the Democratic Party of the Left and held the positions of both regional assessor for the environment and president of the Tuscany.

On 26 October 1992, Marcucci was arrested in Florence in connection with the Bilancino Dam scandal. He was replaced as regional president by Vannino Chiti. He was definitively acquitted of this charge in the final appeal in 1999 because the charges were unfounded.

He was subsequently appointed president of the Regional Institute for Economic Planning of Tuscany and also collaborated with the Research Department of the CEIS in Lucca, focusing in particular on educational programs aimed at overcoming drug addiction.

In 1998, as the leader of a centre-left coalition, he was elected mayor of Viareggio. In 2003, he was re-elected mayor, but without the support of Communist Refoundation Party. His term in office ended in 2008.
