= Mario Leone =

Italian politician (1922–2013)

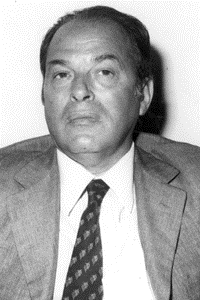

President of Tuscany
- In office 26 September 1978 – 31 May 1983
- Preceded by: Lelio Lagorio
- Succeeded by: Gianfranco Bartolini

Member of the Regional Council of Tuscany
- In office June 1975 – May 1983

Personal details
- Born: 24 August 1922 Florence, Kingdom of Italy
- Died: 17 November 2013 (aged 91) Florence, Tuscany, Italy
- Party: Italian Socialist Party
- Occupation: Manager

Mario Leone (24 August 1922 – 17 November 2013) was an Italian politician who served as president of Tuscany from 1978 to 1983.

A member of the Italian Socialist Party, he also served as deputy mayor of Florence from 1970 to 1974. Leone was elected at the Regional Council of Tuscany in 1975. He was among the founders of the Istituto storico della Resistenza in Toscana (Historical Institute of the Tuscan Resistance).
