= Vannino Chiti =

Italian politician (born 1947)

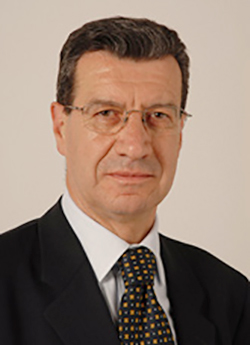

Minister for Constitutional Reforms and Parliamentary Relations
- In office 17 May 2006 – 7 May 2008
- Prime Minister: Romano Prodi
- Preceded by: Carlo Giovanardi (Parliamentary Relations); Roberto Calderoli (Constitutional Reforms)
- Succeeded by: Elio Vito (Parliamentary Relations); Umberto Bossi (Constitutional Reforms)

Mayor of Pistoia
- In office 24 June 1982 – 24 June 1985
- Preceded by: Renzo Bardelli
- Succeeded by: Luciano Pallini

Member of the Regional Council of Tuscany
- In office 18 May 1985 – 17 April 2000

President of Tuscany
- In office 11 January 1992 – 18 May 2000
- Preceded by: Marco Marcucci
- Succeeded by: Claudio Martini

Member of the Chamber of Deputies
- In office 30 May 2001 – 29 April 2008
- Constituency: Florence

Member of the Senate
- In office 29 April 2008 – 22 March 2018
- Constituency: Tuscany

Personal details
- Born: 26 December 1947 (age 78) Pistoia, Italy
- Party: PCI (till 1991); PDS (1991–1998); DS (1998–2007); PD (since 2007)
- Education: University of Florence
- Profession: Politician

Vannino Chiti (born 26 December 1947) is an Italian politician, former president of Tuscany and Minister for Constitutional Reforms and Parliamentary Relations.

== Biography ==
Chiti graduated in philosophy and has always studied the history of catholicism.

In 1970, Chiti joined the Italian Communist Party and became a city councilor in Pistoia, of which he has also been mayor from 1982 to 1985. From 1992 to 2000, Chiti has been President of Tuscany, leading a center-left junta.

He is elected to the Chamber of Deputies with the Democrats of the Left in 2001 and in 2006, year in which Chiti has been appointed Minister for Constitutional Reforms and Parliamentary Relations in the Prodi II Cabinet.

In 2008 and 2013, Chiti is elected to the Senate with the Democratic Party and has been Vice-president of the Senate from 2008 to 2013. A member of the left wing of the PD, Chiti has been politically considered very close to Giuseppe Civati and, along with few others, didn't vote the Rosato electoral law.

Chiti decided not to run for the 2018 general elections, ending after 17 years his experience in Parliament.
