= Assessor (Italy) =

Member of local government in Italy

In Italy an assessor (Italian: assessore) is a member of a Giunta, the executive body in all levels of local government: regions, provinces and comunes.

Assessors are appointed by the chief executive of local government, who chairs the Giunta, the mayor of a comune or the president of a province or region. Assessors serve until they resign, are dismissed by the chief executive, or until the end of the chief executive's term.

In comunes with 15,000 residents or more and in provinces, assessors cannot be members of Consiglio (council), the local legislative body. If members of the council are appointed as assessors, they must resign from the council.

The mayor or president usually assigns to each assessor responsibility for a specific aspect of municipal, provincial or regional affairs and the supervision of corresponding branch of local government, called assessorato (department). Among the assessors one is chosen by mayor or president as his deputy and is called vicesindaco (deputy mayor) or vicepresidente (vice president).

== See also ==
- Alderman
- Scabino
