= Timeline of Pisa =

The following is a timeline of the history of the city of Pisa in the Tuscany region of Italy.

== Prior to 15th century ==
- 225 BCE - A Roman army from Sardinia lands in Pisa.
- 180 BCE - Pisa becomes a Roman colony.
- 89 BCE - Pisans granted Roman citizenship.
- 300 CE - Roman Catholic diocese of Pisa established (approximate date).
- 805 CE - San Paolo a Ripa d'Arno monastery founded.
- 812 CE - Pisa becomes part of the March of Tuscany (territory) of the Holy Roman Empire.
- 990 - San Michele in Borgo monastery founded.
- 1003 - Lucca-Pisa conflict occurs.
- 1004 - Pisa sacked by Saracens.
- 1063 - Pisa Cathedral construction begins.
- 1011 - Pisa unsuccessfully attacked by Saracens again.
- 1092
  - Pisa Cathedral construction completed.
  - Roman Catholic Archdiocese of Pisa established.
- 1095 - Pisans join religious First Crusade forces fighting abroad.
- 1118 - Pisa Cathedral consecrated.
- 1119 - San Pietro in Vinculis church reconsecrated.
- 1132 - San Sisto church consecrated.
- 1140 - Piazza dei Cavalieri, Pisa. the square become the center of Pisa.
- 1147–1150 - The Pisans joined in the Second Crusade.
- 1150 - Santo Sepolcro church built (approximate date).
- 1152 - Pisa Baptistery construction begins.
- 1161 - Walls of Pisa built.
- 1162 - Pisan territory expands.
- 1167 - Flood.^{(it)}
- 1173 - Tower of Pisa construction begins.
- 1187 - Papal election, December 1187 held at Pisa.
- 1228 - Conflict with the united forces of Florence and Lucca near Barga
- 1230 - Santa Maria della Spina church and tower of the San Nicola church built (approximate date).
- 1252 - Santa Caterina church built.
- 1257 - Hospital built.
- 1264 - San Francesco church built.
- 1278 - Camposanto Monumentale (cemetery) built.
- 1284 - Naval Battle of Meloria fought between Pisan and Genoese forces near Livorno; Genoese win.
- 1329 - Santa Maria del Carmine church built.
- 1342 - Lucca annexed to Pisa.
- 1343 - University of Pisa founded by edict of Pope Clement VI.
- 1399 - Republic of Pisa becomes a client state of the Duchy of Milan.

== 15th–19th centuries ==
- 1402 - Gabriele Maria Visconti becomes signore.
- 1406
  - Pisa besieged by Florentine forces.
  - Cittadella Nuova (fortress) construction begins.
- 1482 - Printing press in operation.
- 1494 - French in power.
- 1509 - Florentines in power.
- 1543
  - Orto botanico di Pisa (garden) founded.
  - Palazzo della Sapienza (Pisa) built.
- 1551 - Population: 8,574 within the walls.
- 1555 - Palazzo Lanfranchi, Pisa rebuiling completed.
- 1562 - Piazza dei Cavalieri remodelled.
- 1564
  - Palazzo della Carovana built.
  - Birth of Galileo Galilei, astronomer, physicist and engineer.
- 1569 - Santo Stefano dei Cavalieri church consecrated.
- 1589 - Galileo begins teaching at the university.
- 1590 - Lanfreducci palace built.
- 1596 - Museo storia naturale di Pisa (museum) founded.
- 1605 - Logge di Banchi built.
- 1680 - Flood.^{(it)}
- 1735 - "Austrian grand dukes of the house of Lorraine" in power.
- 1745 - Population: 12,406 within the walls.
- 1777 - Flood.^{(it)}
- 1810 - Scuola Normale Superiore di Pisa (school) founded.
- 1815 - Piazza Santa Caterina created.
- 1841 - Population: 40,477.
- 1844 - Pisa-Livorno railway begins operating.
- 1846 - Pisa–Lucca railway begins operating.
- 1851 - University closes.
- 1859 - University reestablished.
- 1860 - Pisa becomes part of the Kingdom of Italy.
- 1861 - Pisa-Massa railway begins operating.
- 1865 - Teatro Politeama (Pisa) (theatre) opens.
- 1867 - Regio Teatro Nuovo (theatre) opens.
- 1881 - Population: 42,779.
- 1885 - Velodromo Stampace opens.
- 1897 - Population: 65,516.

== 20th century ==
- 1909 - Pisa Sport Club formed.
- 1919 - Arena Garibaldi opens.
- 1930 - Società Storica Pisana (history society) formed.^{(it)}
- 1943 - Bombing of Pisa in World War II in World War II.
- 1944 - Bombing.
- 1945 - Coltano prison camp in operation.
- 1950 - Ponte di Mezzo (bridge) built.
- 1952 - United States military Camp Darby established near city.
- 1963 - Biblioteca Comunale di Pisa (library) established.
- 1979
  - Associazione Teatro di Pisa (theatre organization) formed.
  - 24 November: Italy's first LGBT rights protest march, Pisa79 held.
- 1985 - May: Tuscan communal election, 1985 held.
- 1987 - Sant'Anna School of Advanced Studies established.

== 21st century ==
- 2008 - Marco Filippeschi becomes mayor.
- 2013 - Population: 86,263.
- 2015 - 31 May: Tuscan regional election, 2015 held.
- 2018 - Michele Conti becomes mayor.

== See also ==
- History of Pisa
- List of mayors of Pisa
- List of bishops of Pisa
- List of rulers of the Republic of Pisa, 11th-15th c. (in Italian)
- State Archives of Pisa (state archives)
- History of Tuscany

Other cities in the macroregion of Central Italy:^{(it)}

- Timeline of Ancona, Marche region
- Timeline of Arezzo, Tuscany region
- Timeline of Florence, Tuscany
- Timeline of Grosseto, Tuscany
- Timeline of Livorno, Tuscany
- Timeline of Lucca, Tuscany
- Timeline of Perugia, Umbria region
- Timeline of Pistoia, Tuscany
- Timeline of Prato, Tuscany
- Timeline of Rome, Lazio region
- Timeline of Siena, Tuscany

== Bibliography ==
=== in English ===
- William Smith, ed. (1872) [1854]. "Pisae". Dictionary of Greek and Roman Geography. London: John Murray. hdl:2027/hvd.ah5cur.
- Bella Duffy (1892). The Tuscan Republics (Florence, Siena, Pisa, and Lucca) with Genoa. Story of the Nations. London: T. Fisher Unwin.
- Ismar Elbogen (1905), "Pisa", Jewish Encyclopedia, vol. 10, New York, hdl:2027/msu.31293024395141
- Story of Pisa and Lucca, Mediaeval Towns, London: J.M. Dent & Co., 1907
- Villari, Pasquale (1910). "Pisa" . Encyclopædia Britannica. Vol. 21 (11th ed.). pp. 643–646.
- Benjamin Vincent (1910), "Pisa", Haydn's Dictionary of Dates (25th ed.), London: Ward, Lock & Co., hdl:2027/uc2.ark:/13960/t41r6xh8t
- "Pisa". Catholic Encyclopedia. Vol. 12. New York. 1911.
- "Pisa", Northern Italy (14th ed.), Leipzig: Karl Baedeker, 1913
- William Heywood (1921). History of Pisa: Eleventh and Twelfth Centuries. Cambridge University Press.
- David Herlihy. Pisa in the Early Renaissance: A Study of Urban Growth (New Haven, CT, 1958)
- Jane Skinner Sawyers (1996). "Pisa". In Trudy Ring (ed.). Southern Europe. International Dictionary of Historic Places. Vol. 3. Fitzroy Dearborn. pp. 539–542. ISBN 9781134259588. OCLC 31045650.
- Roy Domenico (2002). "Tuscany: Pisa". Regions of Italy: a Reference Guide to History and Culture. Greenwood. pp. 334+. ISBN 0313307334.
- Christopher Kleinhenz, ed. (2004). "Pisa". Medieval Italy: an Encyclopedia. Routledge. ISBN 0415939291.
- O. Banti. An Illustrated History of Pisa (Pisa, 2010)
- Chris Wickham (2015). "Pisa". Sleepwalking into a New World: The Emergence of Italian City Communes in the Twelfth Century. Princeton University Press. pp. 67–118. ISBN 978-1-4008-6582-6.

=== in Italian ===
- Ranieri Grassi (1836). Descrizione storica e artistica di Pisa e de' suoi contorni con XXII tavole in rame (in Italian). Ranieri Prosperi.
- Emanuele Repetti (1845). "Pisa". Dizionario geografico fisico storico della Toscana (in Italian). Vol. Supplement. Florence. pp. 185–191. hdl:2027/hvd.32044021571781.
- Giovanni Sforza (1871). Memorie storiche della città di Pisa dal 1838 al 1871 (in Italian). Angelo Valenti.
- F. da Scorno (1874). "Principali fatti della storia di Pisa, dall'anno 823 al 1866". Nuova guida di Pisa (in Italian). Giovanni Maria Pizzanelli. (timeline)
- "Pisa". Nuova Enciclopedia Italiana (in Italian) (6th ed.). Turin: Unione Tipografico-Editrice Torinese. 1884. hdl:2027/nnc1.cu08476845.
- "Pisa". Ligúria, Toscana settentrionale, Emília. Guida d'Italia (in Italian). Milan: Touring Club Italiano. 1916. p. 267+. hdl:2027/wu.89003452653.
- "Pisa", Enciclopedia Italiana, 1935
- A. R. Masetti. Pisa storia urbana (Pisa, 1964)
- L. Nuti. Pisa progetto e città, 1814–1865 (Pisa, 1986)
- Gino dell'Ira (1987). Teatri di Pisa (1773-1986) (in Italian).
- E. Tolaini. Pisa (Rome, and Bari, 1992)
- P. L. Rupi and A. Martinelli. Pisa: Storia urbanistica (Ospedaletto, 1997)
