= Enrico Pistolesi =

Mayor of Pisa
- In office 7 July 1960 – 2 January 1961
- Preceded by: Renato Pagni
- Succeeded by: Vittorio Galluzzi

President of the Province of Pisa
- In office 1948–1951
- Preceded by: Aldo Fascetti
- Succeeded by: Antonino Maccarrone

Personal details
- Born: 2 December 1889 Florence, Kingdom of Italy
- Died: 29 February 1968 (aged 78) Pisa, Italy
- Party: Christian Democracy
- Education: Scuola Normale Superiore
- Profession: Engineer, academic

Enrico Pistolesi (2 December 1889 – 29 February 1968) was an Italian mathematician, engineer, academic and politician. He was a pioneer of aerodynamics in Italy and served as professor of applied mechanics at the University of Pisa, where he was dean of the Faculty of Engineering from 1944 to 1965. He also served as president of the Province of Pisa from 1948 to 1951 and as mayor of Pisa from 1960 to 1961 with the Christian Democracy.

Pistolesi was a member of the Accademia Nazionale dei Lincei, the Pontifical Academy of Sciences, the Accademia nazionale delle scienze, and the Turin Academy of Sciences.
