= Massimiliano Angori =

President of the Province of Pisa
- Incumbent
- Assumed office 31 October 2018
- Preceded by: Marco Filippeschi

Mayor of Vecchiano
- Incumbent
- Assumed office 6 June 2016
- Preceded by: Giancarlo Lunardi

Personal details
- Born: 17 July 1967 (age 59) Pisa, Italy
- Party: Democratic Party
- Occupation: Public administrator

Massimiliano Angori (born 17 July 1967) is an Italian politician and public administrator, serving as president of the Province of Pisa since 2018 and mayor of Vecchiano since 2016.

== Life and career ==
Born in Pisa and raised in Nodica, in the municipality of Vecchiano, Angori graduated in natural sciences at the University of Pisa and worked in the public health sector before entering local politics.

He was first elected to the municipal council of Vecchiano in 1997, and was subsequently re-elected in 2001, 2006, and 2011, also serving as municipal assessor.

In June 2016 he was elected mayor of Vecchiano.

In October 2018, Angori was elected president of the Province of Pisa as the candidate of the Democratic Party. He obtained 62.33% of the weighted vote against Michele Conti, mayor of Pisa and centre-right candidate, who received 37.67%. He was re-elected for a second term in December 2022.
