= 1994 Italian local elections =

The 1994 Italian local elections were held on 12 June (with runoffs on 26 June) and 20 November (with runoffs on 4 December). For many cities, they were the first elections conducted after the introduction of the direct election of mayors and presidents of provinces in 1993.

These elections were heavily influenced by the results of the March general election, won by Silvio Berlusconi's Pole of Freedoms–Pole of Good Government alliance. In these elections for the first time the centre-right coalition ran at local level, managing to obtain a majority in several cities. In a small group of cities the centre-left coalition experimented for the first time the alliance between the post-communist Democratic Party of the Left (PDS) and the Christian democratic Italian People's Party (PPI).

The first round of June elections were held on the same day of the 1994 European Parliament election.

== Voting system ==
The semipresidential voting system was the one used for all mayoral elections in Italy of cities with a population higher than 15,000. Under this system voters express a direct choice for the mayor or an indirect choice voting for the party of the candidate's coalition. If no candidate receives at least 50% of votes, the top two candidates go to a run-off after two weeks. The winning candidate obtains a majority bonus equal to 60% of seats in the City Council. During the first round, if no candidate gets more than 50% of votes but a coalition of lists gets the majority of 50% of votes or if the mayor is elected in the first round but its coalition gets less than 40% of the valid votes, the majority bonus cannot be assigned to the coalition of the winning mayor candidate.

The election of the City Council is based on a direct choice for the candidate with a preference vote: the candidate with the majority of the preferences is elected. The number of the seats for each losing party is determined proportionally, using D'Hondt seat allocation. Only coalitions with more than 3% of votes are eligible to get any seats.

== Municipal elections ==
=== Mayoral election results ===
Alliance of Progressives (PDS and allies)
Centre-left coalition (PDS–PPI and allies)
Pole of Freedoms–Pole of Good Government (FI and allies)
Centrist coalition (PPI and allies)
Northern League (LN)

Region	City	Incumbent mayor	Elected mayor	1st round		2nd round		Seats	Source
Region	City	Incumbent mayor	Elected mayor	Votes	%	Votes	%	Seats	Source
June elections
Piedmont	Asti	Giorgio Galvagno (PSI)	Alberto Bianchino (PDS)	13,951	28.73	20,892	56.86	24 / 40	
Lombardy	Como	Renzo Pigni (PSI)	Alberto Botta (FI)	23,787	40.53	22,461	54.46	24 / 40	
Veneto	Rovigo	Luigi Frezzato (PDS)	Fabio Baratella (PDS)	9,690	28.24	15,626	55.26	24 / 40	
Veneto	Verona	Enzo Erminero (DC)	Michela Sironi Mariotti (FI)	50,314	29.50	74,032	61.51	28 / 46	
Friuli-Venezia Giulia	Gorizia	Erminio Tuzzi (DC)	Gaetano Valenti (FI)	11,424	42.13	12,807	57.66	24 / 40	
Liguria	Savona	Sergio Tortarolo (PDS)	Francesco Gervasio (FI)	22,507	47.10	22,761	52.92	24 / 40	
Emilia-Romagna	Parma	Mara Colla (PSI)	Stefano Lavagetto (PDS)	37,299	31.26	51,588	54.74	24 / 40	
Emilia-Romagna	Piacenza	Filippo Grandi (PLI)	Giacomo Vaciago (Ind)	23,551	32.00	31,259	51.04	24 / 40	
Tuscany	Lucca	Arturo Pacini (DC)	Giulio Lazzarini (CS)	15,360	30.71	20,544	53.04	24 / 40	
Tuscany	Pistoia	Lido Scarpetti (PDS)	Lido Scarpetti (PDS)	21,971	36.89	26,963	62.06	24 / 40	
Lazio	Rieti	Paolo Bigliocchi (PSI)	Antonio Cicchetti (AN)	14,304	48.12	13,601	57.05	24 / 40	
Abruzzo	L'Aquila	Giuseppe Placidi (DC)	Antonio Carmine Centi (PDS)	14,293	32.51	20,029	57.01	24 / 40	
Basilicata	Matera	Francesco Saverio Acito (DC)	Mario Manfredi (Ind)	13,053	36.72	19,080	61.15	24 / 40	
Calabria	Catanzaro	Antonio Bevilaqua (PRI)	Benito Gualtieri (PPI)	17,804	31.81	19,889	55.06	24 / 40	
Calabria	Vibo Valentia	Bruno Panuccio (DC)	Giuseppe Iannello (PDS)	7,939	38.96	8,238	50.59	24 / 40	
Sicily	Enna	Vincenzo Vigiano (DC)	Antonio Onofrio Alvano (FI)	4,356	25.16	7,696	50.14	12 / 30	
Sicily	Messina	Salvatore Francesco Leonardi (DC)	Francesco Providenti (PPI)	34,187	26.84	62,689	60.05	12 / 40	
Sicily	Ragusa	Giorgio Massari (DC)	Giorgio Chessari (PDS)	11,818	29.40		59.60	17 / 30	
Sicily	Syracuse	Vincenzo Di Raimondo (DC)	Marco Fatuzzo (Ind)	20,536	31.60	22,781	54.15	14 / 40	
Sicily	Trapani	Mario Buscaino (Ind)	Mario Buscaino (PDS)	12,463	33.46		63.10	12 / 30	
Sardinia	Cagliari	Gaetano Giua Marassi (DC)	Mariano Delogu (AN)	38,242	35.11	47,326	54.52	24 / 40	
Sardinia	Oristano	Pietro Arca (DC)	Mariano Scarpa (PDS)	3,807	19.70	8,384	52.93	24 / 40	
November elections
Lombardy	Brescia	Paolo Corsini (PDS)	Mino Martinazzoli (PPI)	55,905	41.53	65,899	56.47	24 / 40	
Lombardy	Sondrio	Flaminio Benetti (PPI)	Alcide Molteni (PDS)	4,035	26.67	7,702	57.69	24 / 40	
Veneto	Treviso	Gianfranco Gagliardi (PPI)	Giancarlo Gentilini (LN)	12,652	22.97	24,888	54.83	24 / 40	
Tuscany	Massa	Luigi Della Pina (PPI)	Roberto Pucci (PDS)	21,186	49.10	23,779	67.37	24 / 40	
Tuscany	Pisa	Sergio Cortopassi (PSI)	Piero Floriani (PDS)	33,321	53.18	–	–	24 / 40	
Abruzzo	Pescara	Angelo Tranfaglia	Carlo Pace (Ind)	37,356	46.89	38,135	52.07	24 / 40	
Apulia	Brindisi	Francesco Arina (PPI)	Michele Errico (PDS)	16,344	30.73	22,277	51.29	24 / 40	

== Provincial elections ==
=== Presidential election results ===
Centre-left coalition (PDS–PPI and allies)
Pole of Freedoms–Pole of Good Government (FI and allies)
National Alliance (AN)

Region	Province	Incumbent president	Elected president	1st round		2nd round		Seats
Region	Province	Incumbent president	Elected president	Votes	%	Votes	%	Seats
January elections
Sicily	Catania	Antonio Pennisi	Nello Musumeci (AN)	128,239	32.7		66.4	7 / 45
June elections
Tuscany	Lucca	Pier Giorgio Licheri (DC)	Enrico Grabau (AN)		44.9		51.5	18 / 30
Marche	Ancona	Mariano Guzzini (PDS)	Marisa Galeazzi (PDS)	137,737	50.1	—	—	18 / 30
Calabria	Reggio Calabria	Mario Galletta (DC)	Umberto Pirilli (FI)		47.3		52.0	18 / 30
Sicily	Agrigento	Marika Nicosia Caruselli (DC)	Stefano Vivacqua (PSI)		24.8		51.2	19 / 35
Sicily	Caltanissetta	Ernesto Gioacchino Fasulo (DC)	Vincenzo Rampulla (Ind)		46.5		52.6	18 / 30
Sicily	Enna	Michele Galvagno (DC)	Michele Galvagno (PPI)		22.1		54.7	8 / 25
Sicily	Messina	Amelia Ioli (DC)	Giuseppe Buzzanca (AN)		51.8	—	—	18 / 30
Sicily	Palermo	Francesco Caldaronello (DC)	Francesco Musotto (FI)		60.7	—	—	26 / 45
Sicily	Ragusa	Giuseppe Lonatica (PDS)	Giovanni Mauro (FI)		49.4		51.0	9 / 25
Sicily	Syracuse	Salvatore Baio (PDS)	Mario Cavallaro (AN)		57.8	—	—	21 / 35
Sicily	Trapani	Vincenzo Russo (PDS)	Carmelo Spitaleri (FdV)		30.0		56.7	10 / 35
November elections
Tuscany	Massa-Carrara	Amedeo Boiardi (PSI)	Franco Gussoni (PPI)	50,353	46.4		56.0	14 / 24
Apulia	Foggia	Teodoro Moretti (PSI)	Antonio Pellegrino (Ind)		57.3	—	—	18 / 30
