= Antonino Maccarrone =

Italian physician and politician (1922–1972)

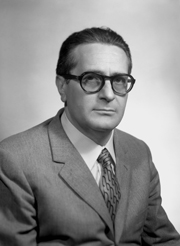

Member of the Senate of the Republic
- In office 1963–1972
- Constituency: Tuscany

President of the Province of Pisa
- In office 1951–1962
- Preceded by: Aldo Fascetti
- Succeeded by: Anselmo Pucci

Personal details
- Born: 7 November 1922 Santa Teresa di Riva, Province of Messina, Kingdom of Italy
- Died: 31 October 1972 (aged 49) Pisa, Tuscany, Italy
- Party: Italian Communist Party
- Education: University of Pisa
- Occupation: Physician

Antonino Maccarrone (7 November 1922 – 31 October 1972) was an Italian physician and politician of the Italian Communist Party. He served as president of the Province of Pisa from 1951 to 1962 and as a member of the Italian Senate from 1963 until his death in 1972.
