= Luigi Bulleri =

Italian politician (1934–2024)

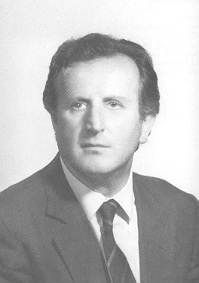
- Bulleri in 1992

Member of the Chamber of Deputies of Italy
- In office 8 July 1983 – 22 April 1992
- Constituency: Pisa

Mayor of Pisa
- In office 14 May 1976 – 14 May 1983
- Preceded by: Elia Lazzari
- Succeeded by: Vinicio Bernardini

Personal details
- Born: 10 May 1934 Pomarance, Italy
- Died: 18 September 2024 (aged 90) Pisa, Italy
- Party: PCI

Luigi Bulleri (10 May 1934 – 18 September 2024) was an Italian politician. A member of the Italian Communist Party, he served as mayor of Pisa from 1976 to 1983 and was a member of the Chamber of Deputies from 1983 to 1992.

Bulleri died in Pisa on 18 September 2024, at the age of 90.
