= Fabio Guidi =

Italian noble, landowner and politician (1863–1944)

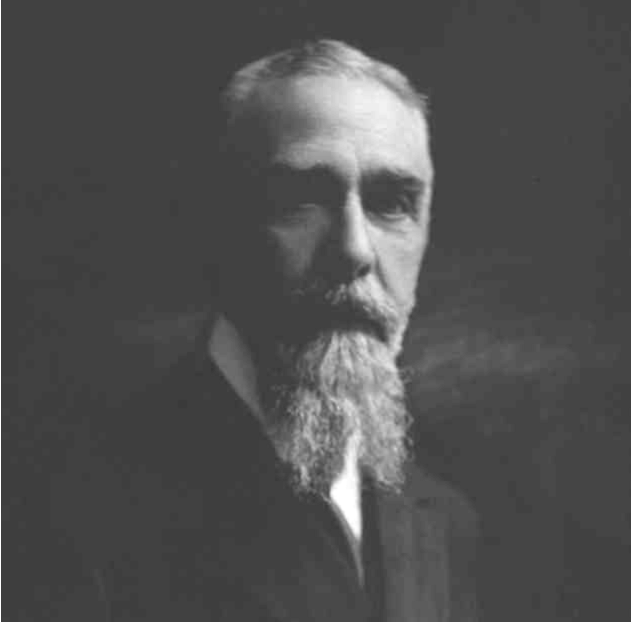

Member of the Senate of the Kingdom of Italy
- In office 23 May 1939 – 5 August 1943

President of the Province of Pisa
- In office 1911–1920
- Preceded by: Cesare Pierini
- Succeeded by: Luigi Giovannardi

Personal details
- Born: 24 January 1863 Pisa, Kingdom of Italy
- Died: 18 April 1944 Volterra, Italian Social Republic
- Party: National Fascist Party
- Occupation: Landowner, entrepreneur

Fabio Luigi Giovanni Vittorio Guidi (24 January 1863 – 18 April 1944) was an Italian noble, landowner, entrepreneur and politician. He served as president of the Province of Pisa from 1911 to 1920 and was a member of the Senate of the Kingdom of Italy from 1939 to 1943. He also served as mayor of Volterra from 1925 to 1927 and later as podestà of Volterra from 1929 to 1934.
