= Andrea Pieroni (politician) =

Italian politician (born 1958)

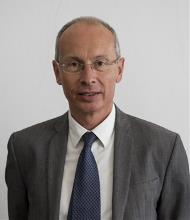

Member of the Regional Council of Tuscany
- In office 17 June 2015 – 11 November 2025

President of the Province of Pisa
- In office 14 June 2004 – 14 October 2014
- Preceded by: Gino Nunes
- Succeeded by: Marco Filippeschi

Personal details
- Born: 23 September 1958 (age 68) Montopoli in Val d'Arno, Province of Pisa, Italy
- Party: Democratic Party
- Education: University of Pisa

Andrea Pieroni (born 23 September 1958) is an Italian politician who served as president of the Province of Pisa (2004–2014) and as a member of the Regional Council of Tuscany (2015–2025).

Political offices
Preceded by Gino Nunes	President of the Province of Pisa; 2004–2014	Succeeded by Marco Filippeschi
