= Gino Nunes =

Italian politician (1941–2013)

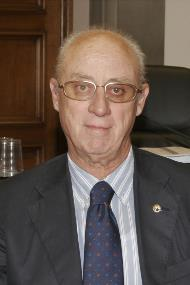

President of the Province of Pisa
- In office 20 July 1990 – 14 June 2004
- Preceded by: Osvaldo Tozzi
- Succeeded by: Andrea Pieroni

Member of the Regional Council of Tuscany
- In office 13 May 2005 – 30 March 2010

Personal details
- Born: 1 November 1941 Livorno, Kingdom of Italy
- Died: 30 June 2013 (aged 71) Pisa, Tuscany, Italy
- Party: Italian Communist Party (until 1991); Democratic Party of the Left (1991–1998); Democrats of the Left (1998–2007); Democratic Party (2007–2013)
- Education: University of Pisa
- Occupation: Physician, trade unionist

Gino Nunes (1 November 1941 – 30 June 2013) was an Italian physician, trade unionist and politician. He served as president of the Province of Pisa from 1990 to 2004 and as a member of the Regional Council of Tuscany from 2005 to 2010.

== Life and career ==
Gino Nunes was born in Livorno on 1 November 1941. He graduated in medicine and surgery from the University of Pisa in 1966 and worked as a dermatologist at the university clinic. In 1979 he left medicine to enter full-time politics, having been involved in political life since his youth.

He began his career in the CGIL trade union, becoming provincial secretary for local authorities and healthcare and later leading the Chamber of Labour in Pontedera. He then joined the provincial leadership of the Italian Communist Party and served as deputy mayor of Pisa from 1985 to 1990.

In 1990 he was elected president of the Province of Pisa, a position he held for three consecutive terms until 2004, making him the longest-serving provincial president in the institution's history. During this period he also held roles within the Union of Italian Provinces (UPI) and on the board of the University of Pisa. He additionally served as vice-president of the Interporto Toscano in Livorno.

In 2005 he was elected to the Regional Council of Tuscany for the constituency of Pisa with the centre-left coalition Uniti nell'Ulivo. He served on the Third Commission (Economic Development) and participated in special and investigative commissions, later joining the Democratic Party group following its formation in 2007. He remained a regional councillor until 2010.

Nunes died on 30 June 2013 in Pisa at the age of 71 after a long illness.

== Sources ==
- "Nunes Gino". Anagrafe degli amministratori locali e regionali (in Italian). Ministero dell'interno.
- "Nunes Gino eletto nelle legislature VIII" (in Italian). Consiglio regionale della Toscana.
