= Fausta Giani Cecchini =

President of the Province of Pisa
- In office 1981–1985
- Preceded by: Roberto Misuri
- Succeeded by: Osvaldo Tozzi

Mayor of Pisa
- In office December 1968 – July 1970
- Preceded by: Giulio Battistini
- Succeeded by: Franco Gemignani

Personal details
- Born: 8 December 1922 Castelfiorentino, Province of Florence, Kingdom of Italy
- Died: 30 March 2004 (aged 81) Pisa, Tuscany, Italy
- Party: Italian Socialist Party

Fausta Giani Cecchini (8 December 1922 – 30 March 2004) was an Italian politician and member of the Italian Socialist Party. She served as mayor of Pisa from 1968 to 1970 and as president of the Province of Pisa from 1981 to 1985. She was the first woman to serve as mayor of a provincial capital in Tuscany.

== Life and career ==
Giani Cecchini was active in the Italian resistance movement during World War II. After the war, she became a leading figure in local politics in Pisa within the Italian Socialist Party.

She was elected mayor of Pisa in December 1968 following the resignation of Giulio Battistini, serving until 1970. From 1981 to 1985 she served as president of the Province of Pisa.

She died on 30 March 2004 in Pisa at the age of 81. She was married to the philosopher Augusto Cecchini. Their children included Angelo Cecchini, a professor of American studies at the University of Pisa, and Maurizio Cecchini, a cardiologist.

A street in the neighborhood of Cisanello, in Pisa, was named in her honor in 2011.
