= Ferdinando Giuseppe Giuli Rosselmini Gualandi =

Italian jurist and politician (1869–1957)

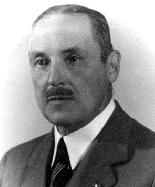

Member of the Senate of the Kingdom of Italy
- In office 23 January 1940 – 5 August 1943

President of the Province of Pisa
- In office 3 July 1938 – July 1942
- Preceded by: Giovanni Corsi
- Succeeded by: Braccino Braccini

Personal details
- Born: 25 October 1869 Pisa, Kingdom of Italy
- Died: 27 February 1957 Pisa, Italy
- Party: National Fascist Party
- Occupation: Jurist, landowner

Ferdinando Giuseppe Giuli Rosselmini Gualandi (25 October 1869 – 27 February 1957) was an Italian jurist, landowner and politician of the National Fascist Party. He served as president of the Province of Pisa from 1938 to 1942 and as a member of the Senate of the Kingdom of Italy from 1940 to 1943. He was previously elected mayor of Lorenzana in 1898.
