= Giulio Battistini =

Italian academic and politician (1912–2004)

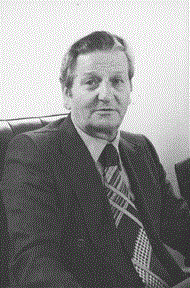

Member of the Chamber of Deputies
- In office 1958–1963
- Constituency: Pisa–Livorno–Lucca–Massa Carrara

Member of the Regional Council of Tuscany
- In office 1970–1980

Mayor of Pisa
- In office July 1967 – December 1968
- Preceded by: Renato Pagni
- Succeeded by: Fausta Giani Cecchini
- In office June 1971 – July 1971
- Preceded by: Vinicio Bernardini
- Succeeded by: Elia Lazzari

Personal details
- Born: 5 April 1912 Pisa, Kingdom of Italy
- Died: 19 February 2004 (aged 91) Pisa, Italy
- Party: Christian Democracy
- Profession: University professor

Giulio Battistini (5 April 1912 – 19 February 2004) was an Italian physicist, engineer, academic and politician. A member of Christian Democracy, he served as a university professor at the University of Pisa before entering politics. He was a full professor of Electrical machine and Electrical engineering construction, and from 1960 to 1985 he was director of the Institute of Electrical Engineering.

He was elected to the Chamber of Deputies in 1958, where he served until 1963. Between 1960 and 1967, he was a member of the European Parliament. He later held local and regional political offices, including mayor of Pisa and member of the Regional Council of Tuscany.
