= Michele Conti =

Michele Conti may refer to:

- Michele Conti (politician) (born 1970), Italian politician
- Michele Conti (motorcyclist) (born 1983), Italian motorcycle racer
