= Giovanni Corsi (politician) =

Italian engineer and politician (1867–1953)

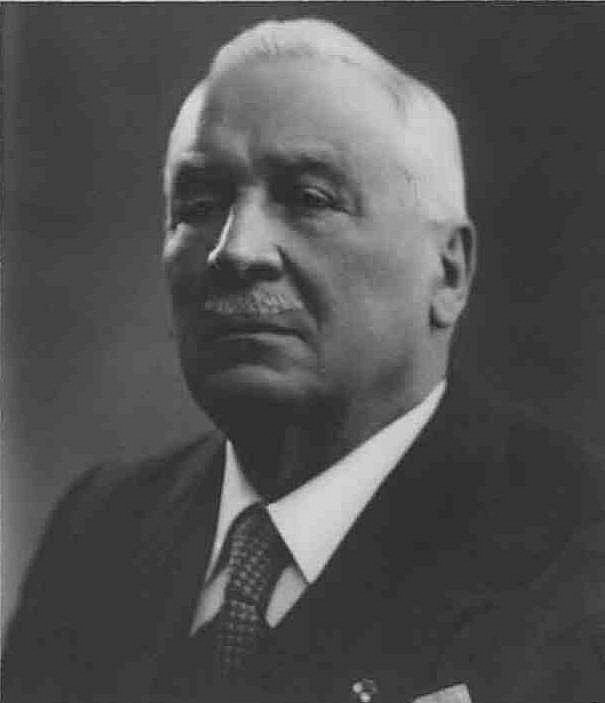

Member of the Senate of the Kingdom of Italy
- In office 14 November 1939 – 5 August 1943

President of the Province of Pisa
- In office 22 February 1923 – 3 July 1938
- Preceded by: Annibale Messerini
- Succeeded by: Ferdinando Giuseppe Giuli Rosselmini Gualandi

Personal details
- Born: 28 January 1867 Calcinaia, Province of Pisa, Kingdom of Italy
- Died: 12 December 1953 Pisa, Italy
- Party: National Fascist Party
- Occupation: Civil engineer

Giovanni Corsi (28 January 1867 – 12 December 1953) was an Italian civil engineer and politician of the National Fascist Party. He served as president of the Province of Pisa from 1923 to 1938 and was a member of the Senate of the Kingdom of Italy from 1939 until 1943.
