= Osvaldo Tozzi =

Italian politician (1930–2026)

President of the Province of Pisa
- In office 15 July 1986 – 20 July 1990
- Preceded by: Fausta Giani Cecchini
- Succeeded by: Gino Nunes

Personal details
- Born: 1 September 1930 Radicondoli, Italy
- Died: 23 July 2026 (aged 95) Pisa, Italy
- Party: PCI
- Education: University of Pisa

Osvaldo Tozzi (1 September 1930 – 23 July 2026) was an Italian politician. A member of the Italian Communist Party, he served as president of the Province of Pisa from 1986 to 1990.

Tozzi died on 23 July 2026, at the age of 95.
