= List of presidents of the Province of Pisa =

President of the Province of Pisa
- Presidente della Provincia di Pisa
- Incumbent; Massimiliano Angori since 31 October 2018
- Residence: Palazzo della Provincia
- Term length: 4 years
- Inaugural holder: Emilio Bianchi
- Formation: 1889

The president of the Province of Pisa is the head of the provincial government in Pisa, Tuscany, Italy. The president oversees the administration of the province, coordinates the activities of the municipalities, and represents the province in regional and national matters. The provincial government is headquartered in the Palazzo della Provincia in Pisa, where the council chamber is located.

Since October 2018, the office has been held by Massimiliano Angori of the Democratic Party.

== History ==
The Provincial Deputation was established in 1861 following the unification of Italy, serving as the executive branch of the province alongside the Provincial Council, which acts as the legislative body. Until 1889, the role of president of the deputation was held by the prefect. The first president elected in 1889 was Emilio Bianchi, who served until 1893.

During the Fascist regime (1926–1944), the Provincial Rectorate replaced the deputation, and presidents were appointed by the central government. After World War II, the Provincial Deputation was briefly reinstated (1944–1951) before the modern office of the President of the Province was established in 1951, elected by the Provincial Council.

From 1995 to 2014, the president was elected directly by the citizens of the province. Following the 2014 Delrio reform, presidents are elected by the Assembly of the mayors and municipal councillors of the province's municipalities, and the term of office was reduced from five to four years.

== List ==
=== Presidents of the Provincial Deputation (1889–1926) ===
No.	Portrait	Name	Term of office		Party
No.	Portrait	Name	Start	End	Party
1		Emilio Bianchi	1889	1893	
2		Francesco Bacci	1893	1895	
3		Giuseppe Raffaello Cerrai	1895	1896	
4		Amerigo Lecci	1897	August 1900	
5		Antonio Moschini	August 1900	August 1902	
6		Niccola Borri	August 1902	April 1909	
7		Cesare Pierini	April 1909	August 1911	
8		Fabio Guidi	August 1911	August 1920	
9		Luigi Giovannardi	August 1920	August 1922	
10		Annibale Messerini	September 1922	22 February 1923	
11		Giovanni Corsi	22 February 1923	7 August 1926	

=== Presidents of the Provincial Rectorate (1926–1944) ===
No.	Portrait	Name	Term of office		Party
No.	Portrait	Name	Start	End	Party
–		Giovanni Corsi	7 August 1926	29 April 1929	Royal commissioner
1		Giovanni Corsi	29 April 1929	3 July 1938	National Fascist Party
2		Ferdinando Giuseppe Giuli Rosselmini Gualandi	3 July 1938	18 July 1942	National Fascist Party
3		Braccino Braccini	18 July 1942	26 September 1944	National Fascist Party

=== Presidents of the Provincial Deputation (1944–1951) ===
No.	Portrait	Name	Term of office		Party
No.	Portrait	Name	Start	End	Party
1		Aldo Fascetti	1944	February 1948	Christian Democracy
2		Enrico Pistolesi	1948	1951	Christian Democracy

=== Presidents of the Province (1951–present) ===
No.	Portrait	Name	Term of office		Party	Election
No.	Portrait	Name	Start	End	Party	Election
1		Antonino Maccarrone	1951	1956	Italian Communist Party	1951
1		Antonino Maccarrone	1956	1960	Italian Communist Party	1956
1		Antonino Maccarrone	1960	1962	Italian Communist Party	1960
2		Anselmo Pucci	1962	1964	Italian Communist Party	1960
2		Anselmo Pucci	1964	1970	Italian Communist Party	1964
3		Renzo Moschini	1970	1975	Italian Communist Party	1970
4		Gioiello Orsini	1975	1980	Italian Socialist Party	1975
5		Roberto Misuri	1980	1981	Italian Socialist Party	1980
6		Fausta Giani Cecchini	1981	1985	Italian Socialist Party	1980
7		Osvaldo Tozzi	15 July 1986	20 July 1990	Italian Communist Party	1985
8		Gino Nunes	20 July 1990	7 June 1995	Italian Communist Party	1990
8		Gino Nunes	7 June 1995	14 June 1999	Democratic Party of the Left	1995
8		Gino Nunes	14 June 1999	14 June 2004	Democrats of the Left	1999
9		Andrea Pieroni	14 June 2004	8 June 2009	The Daisy / Democratic Party	2004
9		Andrea Pieroni	8 June 2009	14 October 2014	Democratic Party	2009
10		Marco Filippeschi	14 October 2014	31 October 2018	Democratic Party	2014
11		Massimiliano Angori	31 October 2018	11 December 2022	Democratic Party	2018
11		Massimiliano Angori	11 December 2022	Incumbent	Democratic Party	2022

== Sources ==
- Cifelli, Alberto (2008). L'istituto prefettizio dalla caduta del fascismo all'Assemblea costituente. I Prefetti della Liberazione (PDF). Rome: Scuola Superiore dell'Amministrazione dell'Interno. Archived from the original (PDF) on 2019-09-03.
- Fasano Guarini, Elena (2004). La Provincia di Pisa (1865-1990). Bologna: Il Mulino.
- Menichini, Piera (2005). "I presidenti delle Province dall'Unità alla Grande guerra: repertorio analitico". Storia Amministrazione Costituzione (13): 277–278.
