= Cittadella Nuova =

Fortress in Pisa, Italy

Coordinates: 43°42′39.71″N 10°24′24.36″E

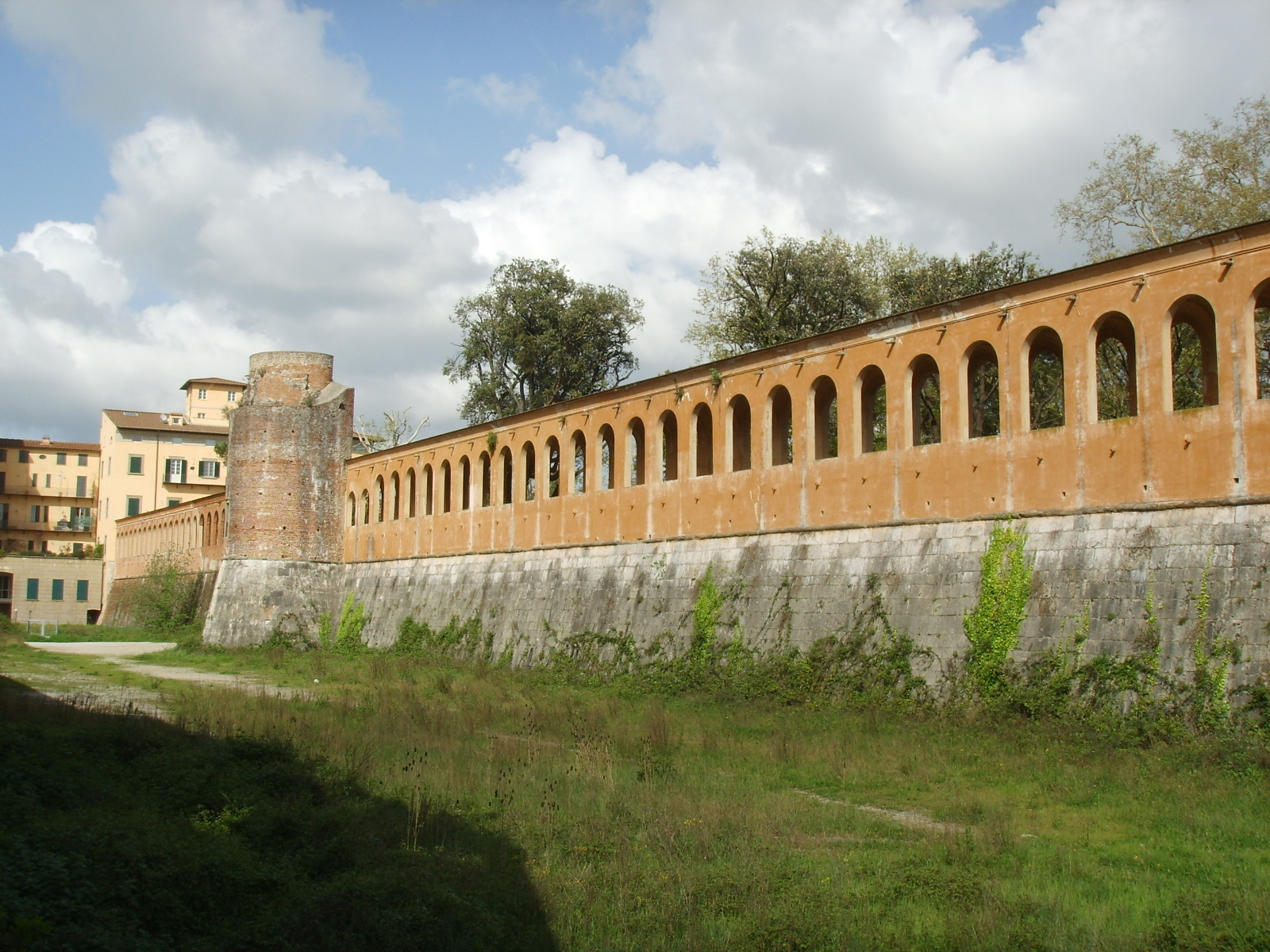
Chemin de ronde, with turret

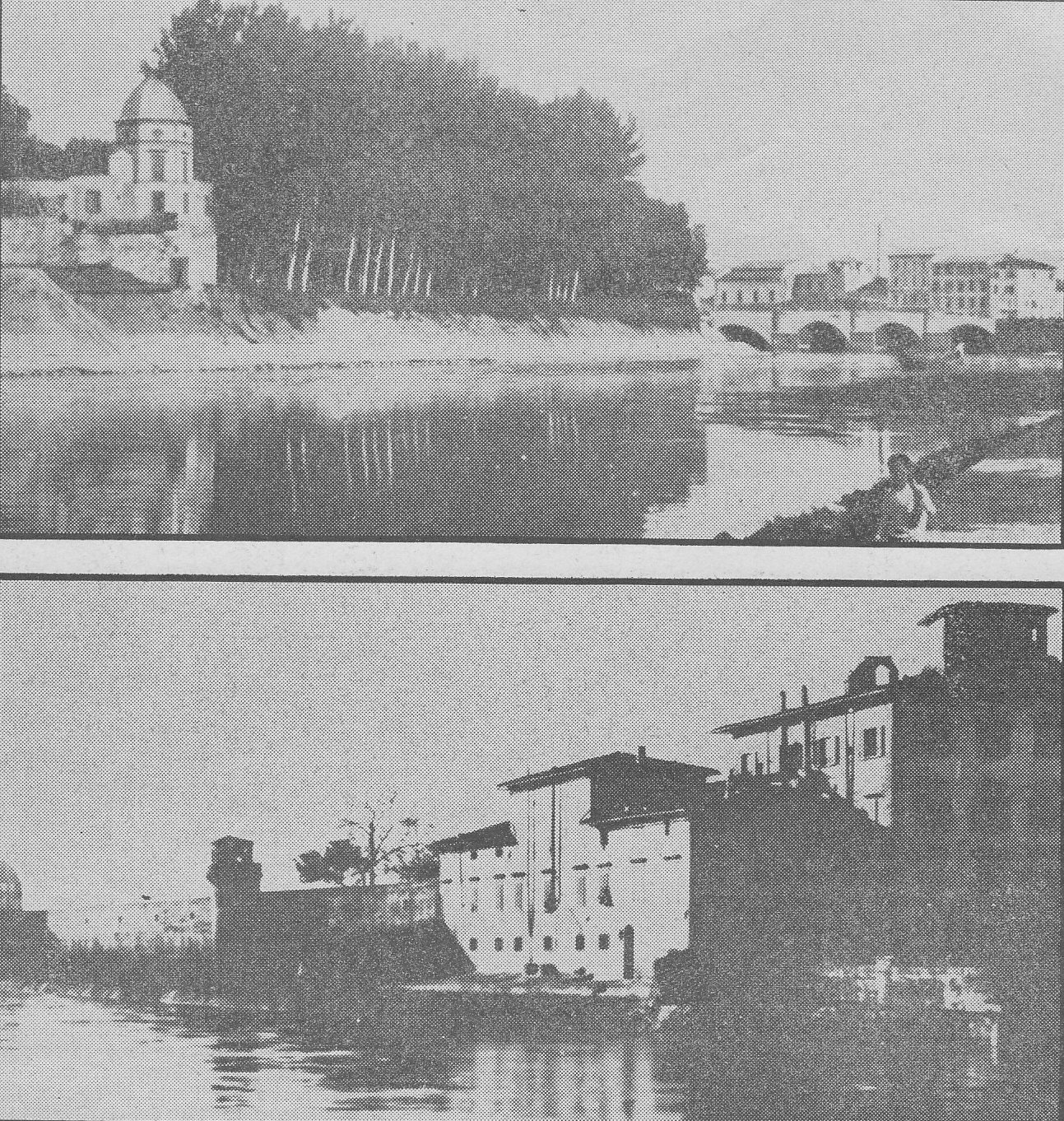
Two images of the Giardino Scotto when it still overlooked the Arno

The Cittadella Nuova (New Citadel), now called the Giardino di Scotto or Giardino Scotto (Scotto's Garden) is an old fortress in Pisa.

== History ==
The citadel was called "nuova" (new) to distinguish it from the older Cittadella Vecchia on the seaward side of the city. The Cittadella Nuova is located on the extreme opposite side of the city walls of Pisa in Lungarno Fibonacci, on the south bank of the river Arno between the Ponte della Vittoria and the Ponte della Fortezza.

Construction began in 1440 during the first period of Florentine rule. In the course of the Pisan revolt and battles which led to the Florentine reconquest of the city, the fortress was damaged and had to be restored by architect Giuliano da Sangallo.

This new reconstruction was designed to stand against forces using cannon - one of the first fortresses in Italy to do so.

Inside the fortifications of the Cittadella Nuova, there is an extensive garden created at the beginning of the nineteenth century by architect Giovanni Caluri for the Livornese shipping-magnate, Domenico Scotto.

The Scotto brother had acquired the fortress in 1798 when grand-duke Leopold I of Tuscany put it up for sale and quickly began work on the construction of a palace with a vast green space. Legend has it that the enormous plane tree which rises in the middle of the garden, was planted during a theatrical performance by Carlo Goldoni, but in reality he died before the Scotto family acquired the garden.

In the 1930s, the area became a public garden and was used for shows, theatrical performances, concerts and as an open-air cinema in summer - a role which it retains to this day.

The Scotto family's palace was largely destroyed during the Second World War and the garden grew ever more degraded until 2008 when it was largely reconstructed and refitted.

== Other images ==
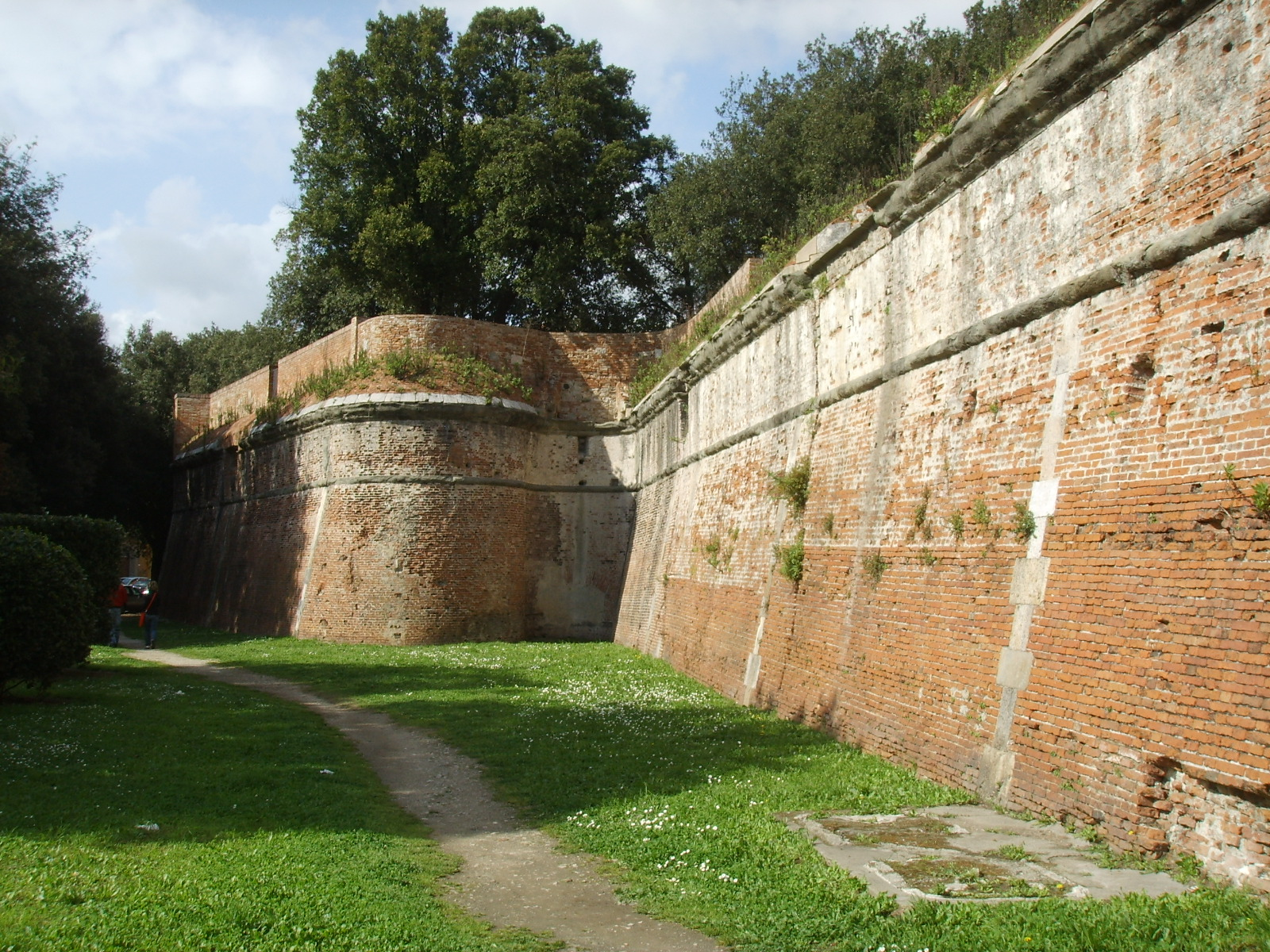
Bastion

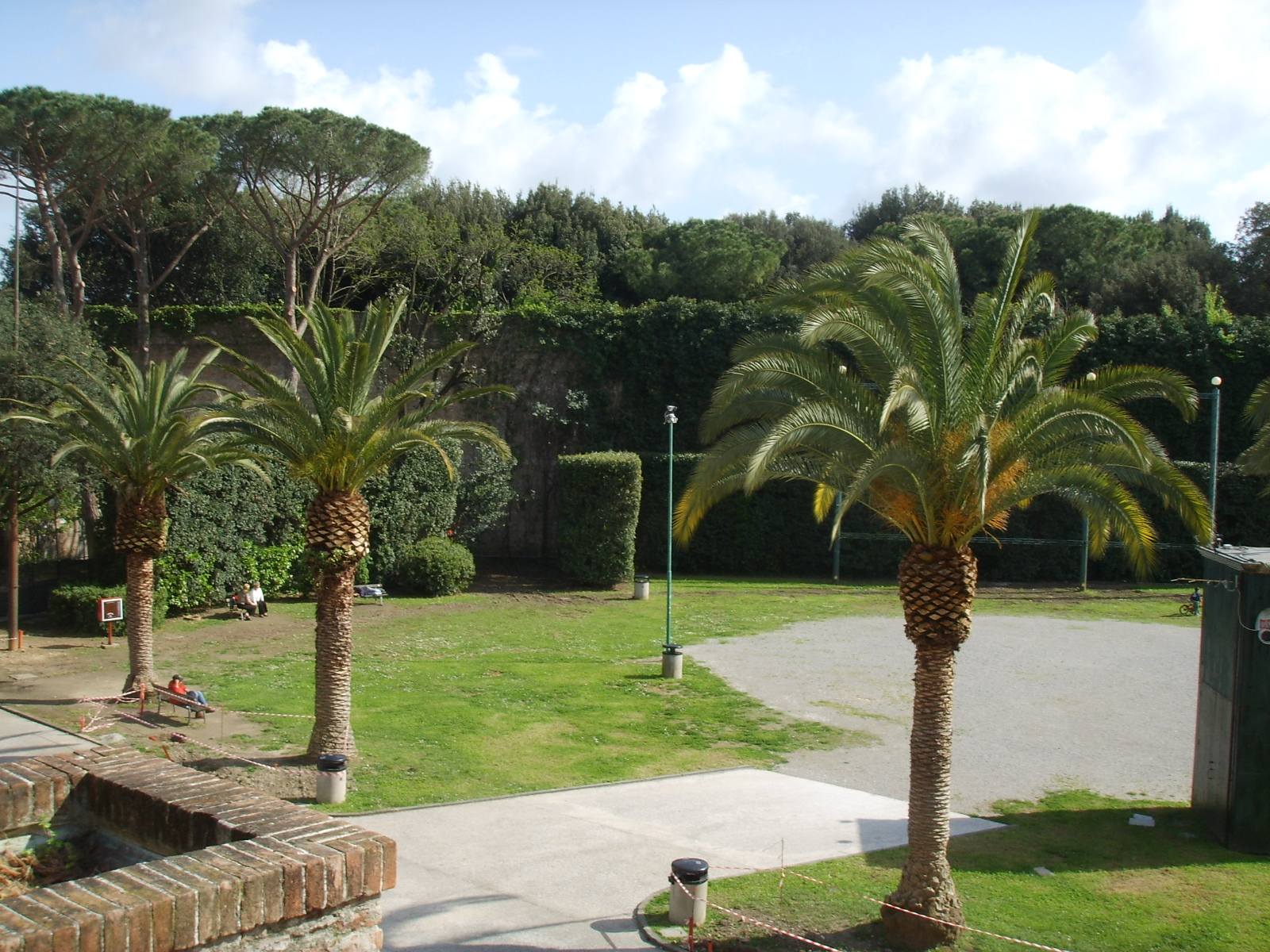
Garden

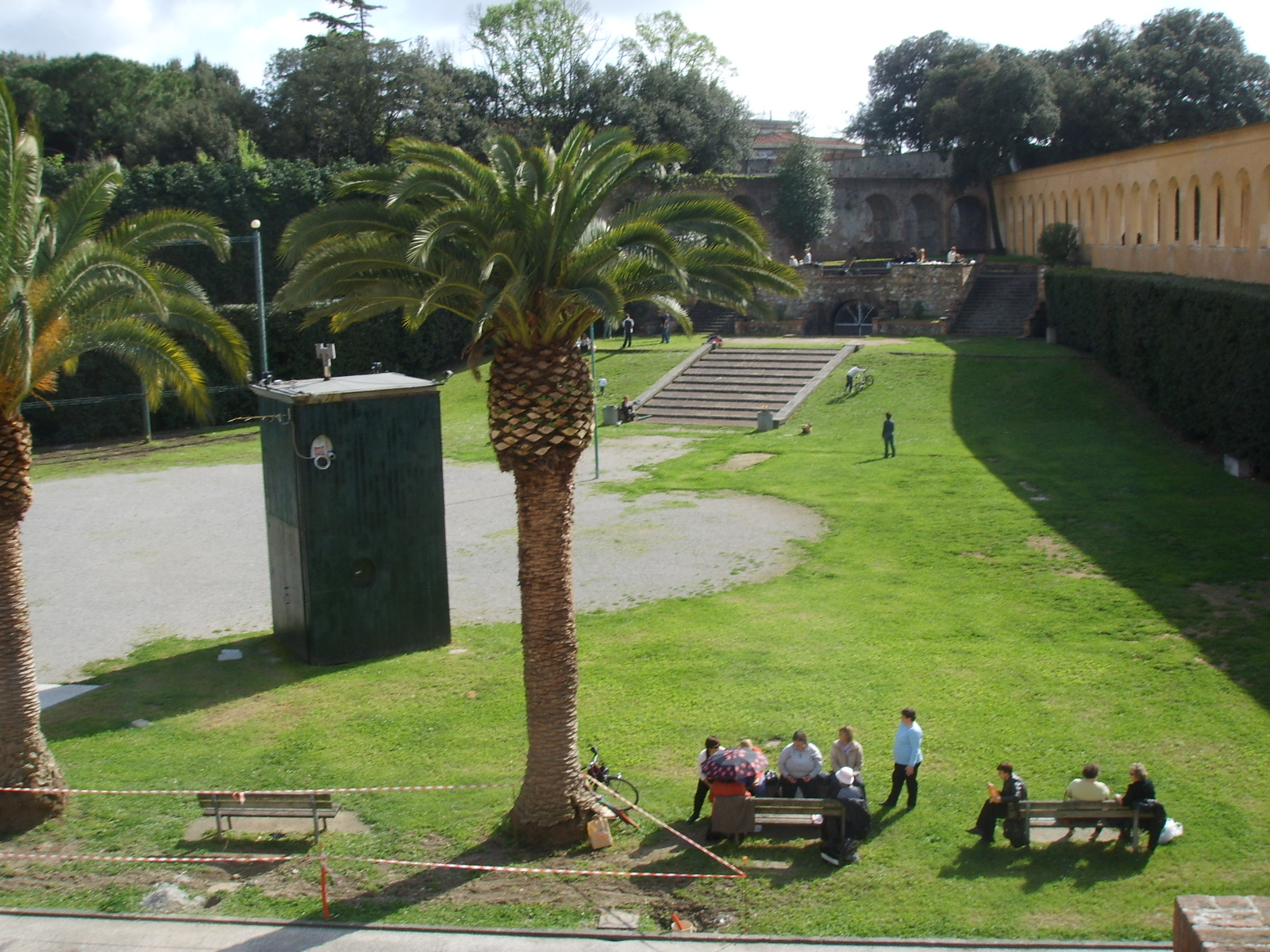
Natural amphitheatre

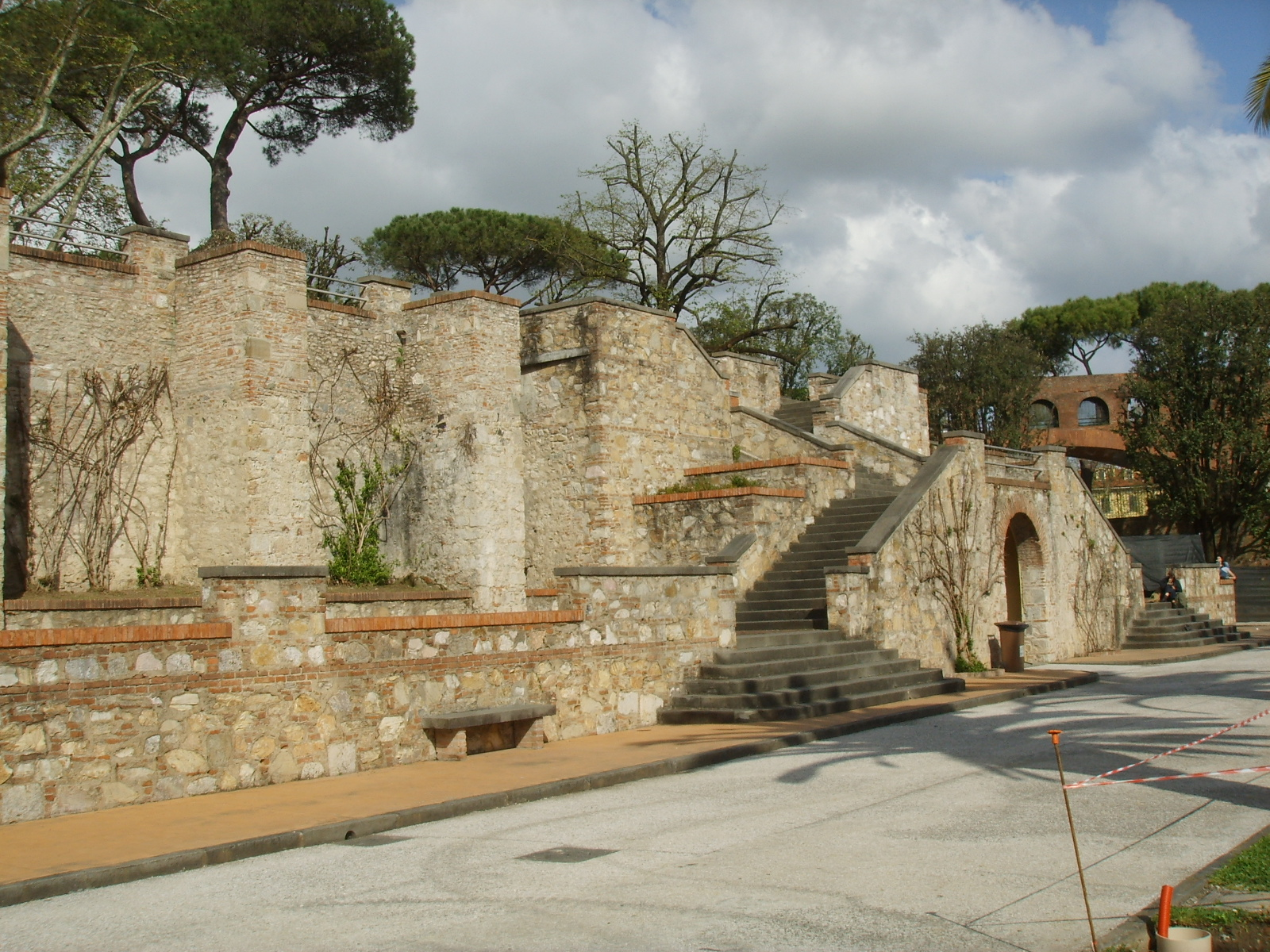
Stairway

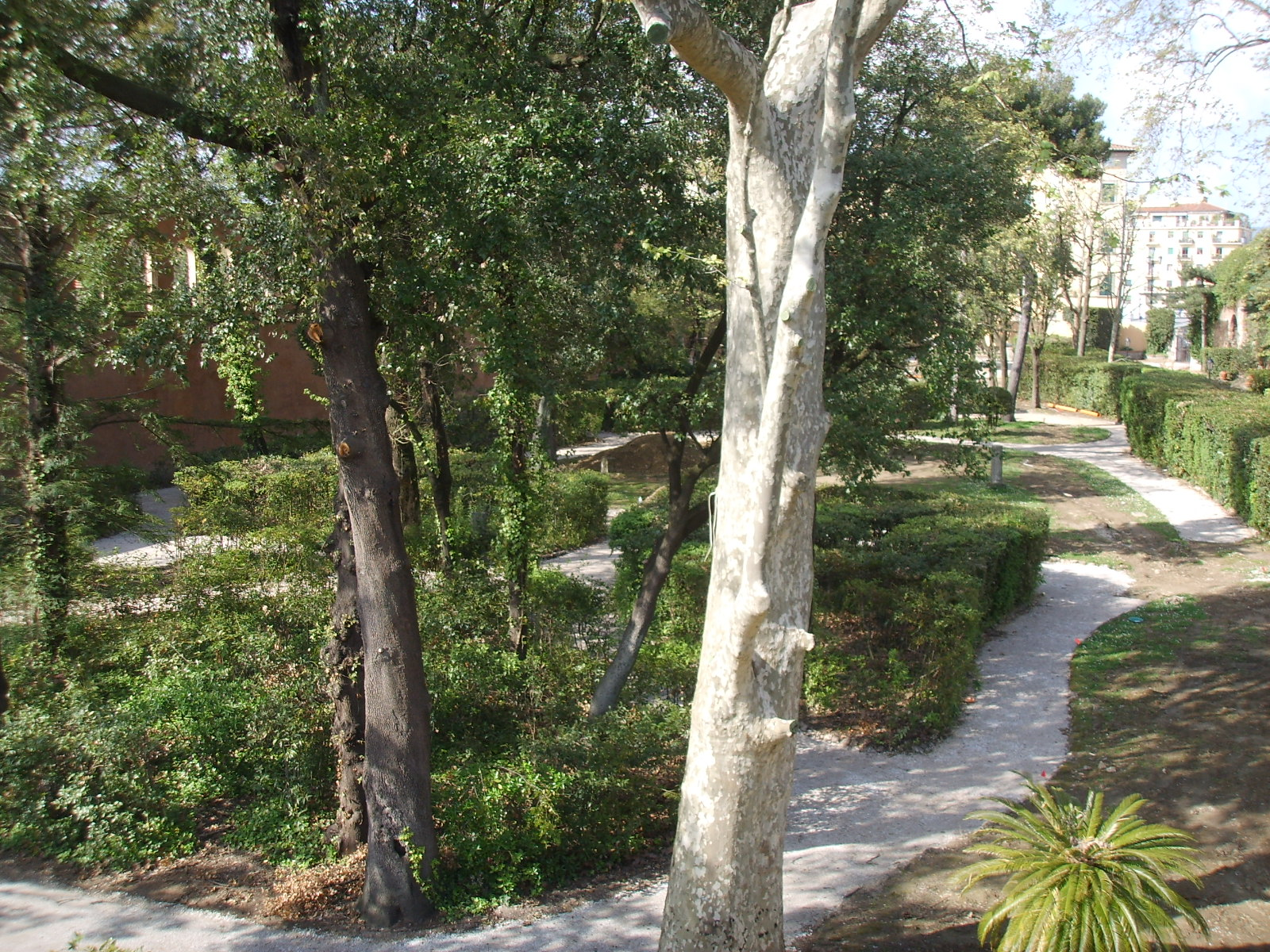
Restored portion of the garden (April 2008)

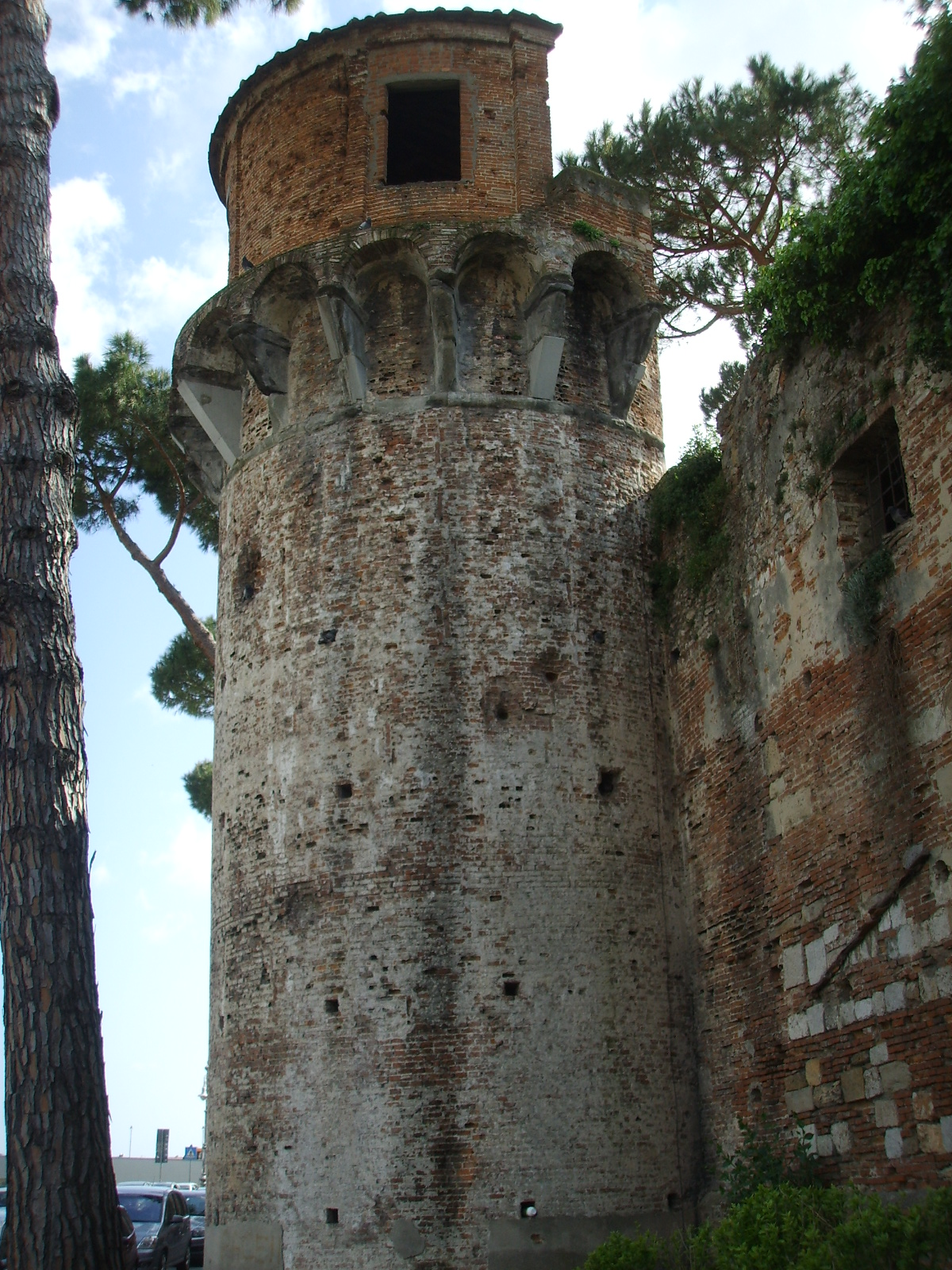
Turret

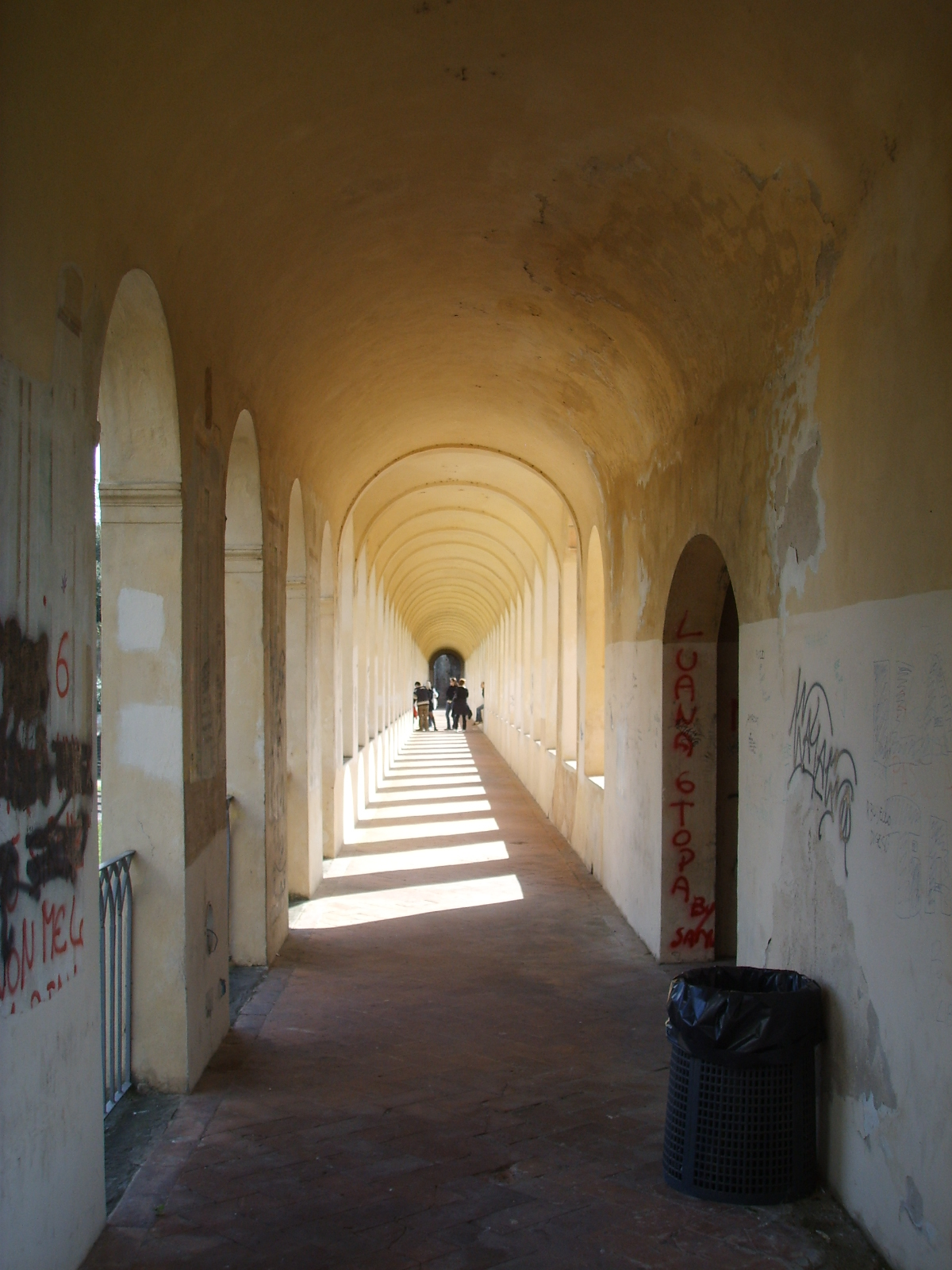
Interior of the chemin de ronde

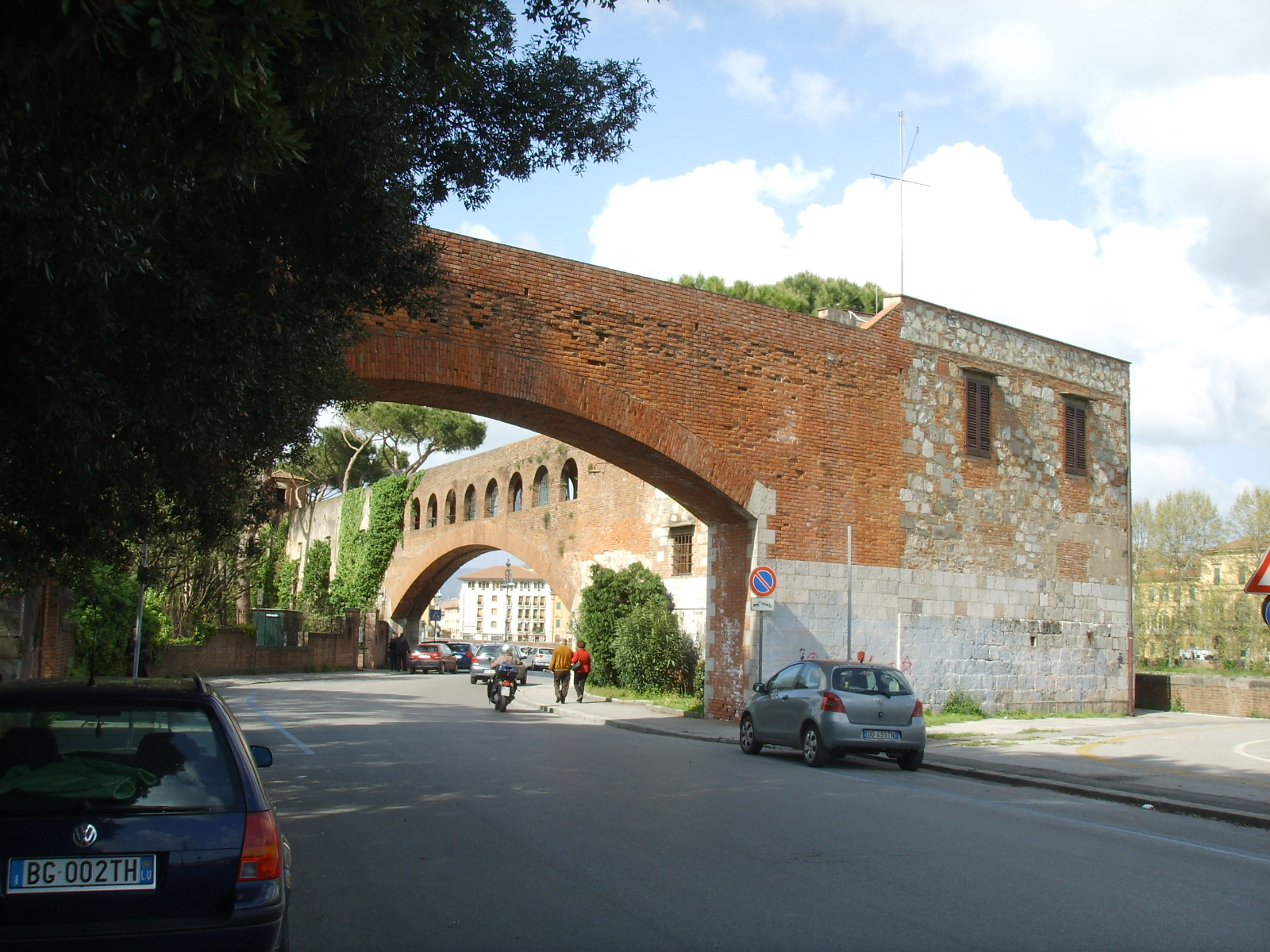
Arched passageway to the riverside
