= Sergio Cortopassi =

Italian politician

Mayor of Pisa
- In office 16 July 1990 – 1 September 1994
- Preceded by: Giacomino Granchi
- Succeeded by: Piero Floriani

Personal details
- Born: 7 May 1946 (age 80) San Miniato, Tuscany, Italy
- Party: Italian Socialist Party
- Profession: employee

Sergio Cortopassi (born 7 May 1946 in San Miniato) is an Italian politician.

He was a member of the Italian Socialist Party and was elected Mayor of Pisa on 16 July 1990. He resigned and left his office on 1 September 1994.

== Biography ==
A member of the Italian Socialist Party, he was elected mayor of Pisa on July 16, 1990, and governed the Tuscan city until September 1, 1994, when the city government was placed under administrative supervision. During the term of the city government led by Paolo Fontanelli, he served as councilor for the budget and taxation.

From 2008 to 2011, he served as president of the Fondazione Teatro di Pisa, and from 2011 to 2013, he served as sole director of Pisamo, the City of Pisa’s transportation management company.

== See also ==
- 1990 Italian local elections
- List of mayors of Pisa

Political offices
Preceded by Giacomino Granchi	Mayor of Pisa; 1990–1994	Succeeded by Piero Floriani
