= Renato Pagni =

Italian politician

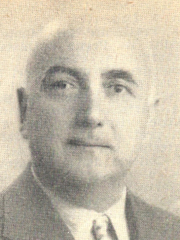

Member of the Senate of the Republic
- In office 1960–1963

Mayor of Pisa
- In office 11 June 1951 – 1 July 2956
- Preceded by: Italo Bargagna
- Succeeded by: Italo Pellegrini
- In office 17 December 1958 – 7 July 1960
- Preceded by: Vittorio Galluzzi
- Succeeded by: Enrico Pistolesi
- In office 11 August 1964 – 14 March 1965
- Preceded by: Umberto Viale
- Succeeded by: Roberto Supino
- In office 14 May 1965 – 14 February 1967
- Preceded by: Roberto Supino
- Succeeded by: Giulio Battistini

Personal details
- Born: 23 March 1902 Bientina, Province of Pisa, Kingdom of Italy
- Died: 5 February 1981 Pisa, Tuscany, Italy
- Party: Christian Democracy
- Occupation: Teacher

Renato Pagni (23 March 1902 – 5 February 1981) was an Italian politician for the Christian Democracy, who served as a member of the Senate of the Republic from 1960 to 1963. He also served as mayor of Pisa for multiple terms between 1951 and 1967.
