= Italo Bargagna =

Italian politician

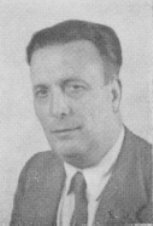

Member of the Constituent Assembly of Italy
- In office 1946–1948

Mayor of Pisa
- In office 31 March 1946 – 11 June 1951
- Preceded by: Carlo Zanetto Lami (podestà)
- Succeeded by: Renato Pagni

Personal details
- Born: 3 April 1889 Pisa, Kingdom of Italy
- Died: 27 April 1970 (aged 81)
- Party: Italian Communist Party

Italo Bargagna (3 April 1889 – 27 April 1970) was an Italian politician who served as a member of the Constituent Assembly of Italy (1946–1948) and mayor of Pisa (1944–1951).
