= Vittorio Galluzzi =

Italian lawyer and politician (1901–1970)

Member of the Chamber of Deputies
- In office 14 September 1966 – 4 June 1968

Mayor of Pisa
- In office 14 August 1956 – 17 December 1958
- Preceded by: Italo Pellegrini
- Succeeded by: Renato Pagni
- In office 2 January 1961 – 14 October 1961
- Preceded by: Enrico Pistolesi
- Succeeded by: Umberto Viale

Personal details
- Party: Italian Socialist Party
- Profession: Lawyer

Vittorio Galluzzi (14 January 1901 – 27 July 1970) was an Italian lawyer and politician who served as mayor of Pisa (1956–1958, 1961) and later as a member of the Chamber of Deputies (1966–1968).
