= Piero Floriani =

Italian politician

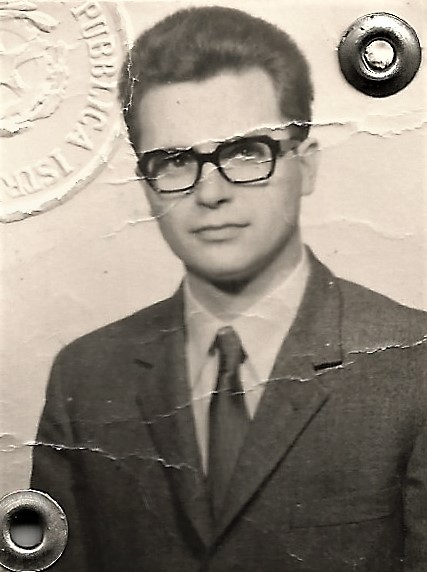
- Piero Floriani in 1970

Mayor of Pisa
- In office 24 November 1994 – 14 December 1998
- Preceded by: Sergio Cortopassi
- Succeeded by: Paolo Fontanelli

Personal details
- Born: January 19, 1942 Raša, Istria County, Croatia
- Died: October 9, 2018 (aged 76) Pisa, Tuscany, Italy
- Party: Democratic Party of the Left
- Education: University of Pisa
- Profession: professor

Piero Floriani was an Italian professor and politician.

He was a professor of philology and Italian literature at Pisa University.

Member of the Democratic Party of the Left, he served as Mayor of Pisa from 24 November 1994 to 14 December 1998.

== See also ==
- 1994 Italian local elections
- List of mayors of Pisa

Political offices
Preceded by Sergio Cortopassi	Mayor of Pisa; 1994–1998	Succeeded by Paolo Fontanelli
