= Elia Lazzari =

Italian politician (1927–2019)

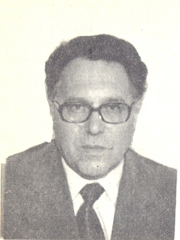

Member of the Senate of the Republic
- In office 5 July 1976 – 11 July 1983
- Constituency: Pisa

Mayor of Pisa
- In office 13 July 1971 – 19 May 1976
- Preceded by: Giulio Battistini
- Succeeded by: Luigi Bulleri

Personal details
- Born: 27 March 1927 Sant'Angelo in Vado, Province of Pesaro, Kingdom of Italy
- Died: 24 December 2019 (aged 92) Pisa, Tuscany, Italy
- Party: Christian Democracy (until 1971); Italian Communist Party (since 1971)
- Profession: Teacher

Elia Lazzari (27 March 1927 – 24 December 2019) was an Italian teacher, trade unionist and politician. He served as mayor of Pisa (1971–1976) and as a Senator (1976–1983). He was a member of Christian Democracy before joining the Italian Communist Party in the early 1970s.

== Biography ==
A middle school teacher, he was one of the leading figures in Pisa local politics during the 1970s.

A labor unionist and former member of the ACLI and the Christian Democracy (Italy), he aligned himself with the Italian Communist Party in 1971 and, following an agreement reached between the PCI (whose leader in the City Council was then Massimo D'Alema), the PSI, and the left wing of the Christian Democrats, he became mayor of Pisa in July 1971, a position he held until May 1976.

He was elected to the Senate of the Republic (Italy) in 1976and 1979 on the PCI ticket, joining the Independent Left (Italy) caucus on both occasions. His term in Parliament ended in July 1983.

He died on Christmas Eve 2019 at the age of 92.
