= Enzo Erminero =

Italian businessman and politician (1931–2023)

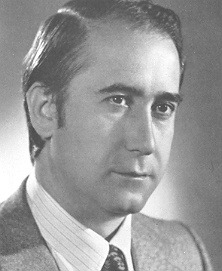
- Erminero in 1970

Mayor of Verona
- In office 24 April 1993 – 1 December 1993
- Preceded by: Aldo Sala
- Succeeded by: Alberto De Muro (as prefectural commissioner)

Member of the Chamber of Deputies of Italy for Veneto 2
- In office 5 June 1968 – 11 July 1983

Personal details
- Born: 8 June 1931 Verona, Italy
- Died: 26 November 2023 (aged 92) Verona, Italy
- Party: DC
- Occupation: Entrepreneur

Enzo Erminero (8 June 1931 – 26 November 2023) was an Italian businessman and politician. A member of Christian Democracy, he served in the Chamber of Deputies from 1968 to 1983 and was Mayor of Verona from April to December 1993.

Erminero died in Verona on 26 November 2023, at the age of 92.
