= Ponte della Vittoria, Pisa =

Bridge in Pisa

Ponte della Vittoria
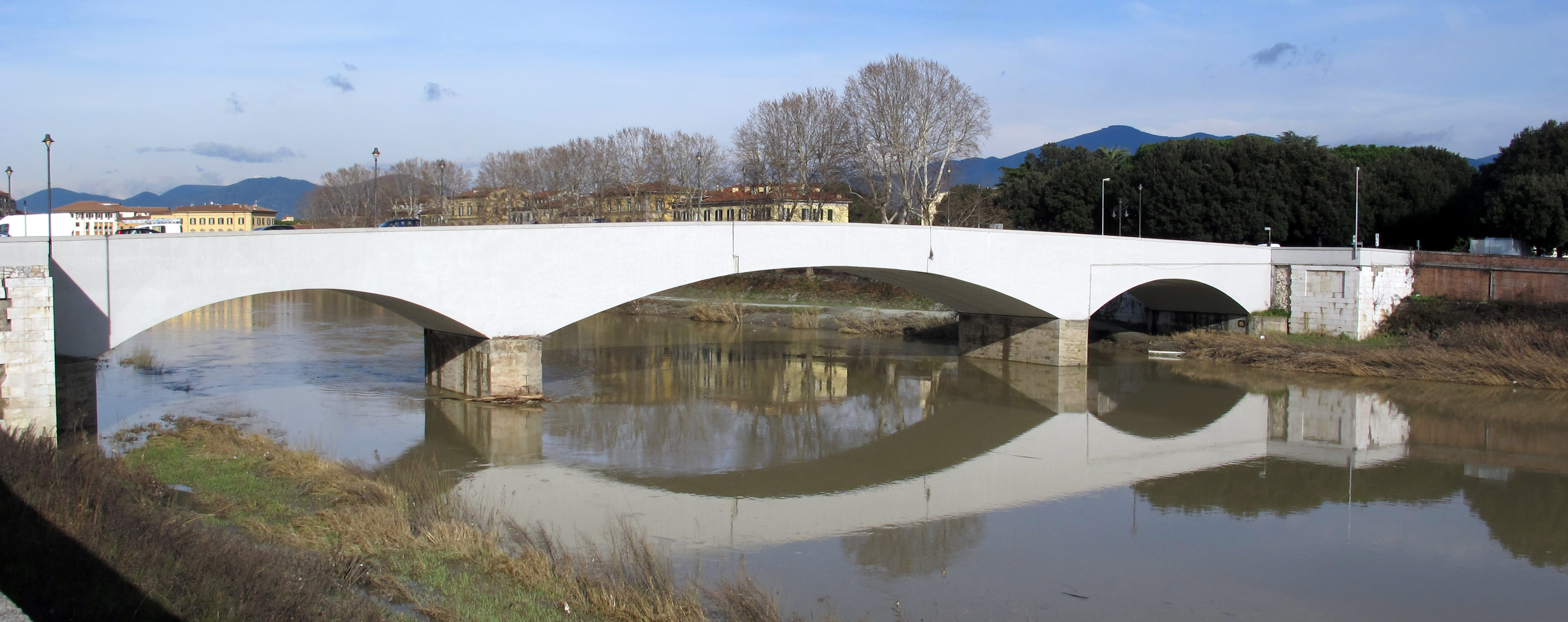
- Coordinates: 43°42′36″N 10°24′30″E
- Locale: Pisa

Characteristics
- Design: Arch bridge
- Material: Reinforced concrete, stone facing
- Total length: 122.40
- Height: 12.25
- No. of spans: 49

History
- Engineering design by: Sogene
- Construction start: 1949
- Construction end: 1950

Location
- Interactive map of Ponte della Vittoria

The Ponte della Vittoria (Bridge of Victory) is a bridge over the Arno in Pisa.

== Technical characteristics ==
The Ponte della Vittoria is 122.4 metres long, with a maximum height of 12.25 metres and three arches with a maximum span of 49 metres. It is made of reinforced concrete. Two false shoulders emphasise the join with the riverside balustrade with concrete cassons faced with stone.

== History ==
In the Fascist period, various public works were planned for the city of Pisa, of which only the bridge on the site of the Ponte della Vittoria which connected the station and the Politeama was actually built.

The construction was completed in 1931, but the bridge collapsed on the evening of 22 December 1934, before it had even been inaugurated. The cause of the collapse was linked to the excessive pomp required by the Fascist architecture of the period: in fact, it was caused by the excessive load resulting from the large quantity of marble statues.

The bridge was rebuilt a few years later only to be destroyed during the Second World War and was quickly rebuilt again by the Sogene between February 1949 and March 1950, on behalf of the Ministry of Public Labour.

== Bibliography ==
- Giorgio Batini, Album di Pisa, Firenze, La Nazione, 1972.
- Francesco Guerrieri, Lucia Bracci, Giancarlo Pedreschi, I ponti sull'Arno dal Falterona al mare, Firenze, Edizioni Polistampa, 1998.
