= Aldo Fascetti =

Italian lawyer, politician and industrial manager (1901–1960)

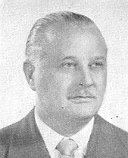

Member of the Chamber of Deputies
- In office 1948–1958

President of the Province of Pisa
- In office September 1944 – February 1948
- Preceded by: Braccino Braccini
- Succeeded by: Enrico Pistolesi

Personal details
- Born: 22 October 1901 Pisa, Kingdom of Italy
- Died: 25 September 1960 (aged 58) Pisa, Italy
- Party: Christian Democracy
- Occupation: Lawyer

Aldo Fascetti (22 October 1901 – 25 September 1960) was an Italian lawyer, politician and industrial manager. He served as a member of the Chamber of Deputies from 1948 to 1958 and was president of the Institute for Industrial Reconstruction (IRI) from 1956 until his death.

== Sources ==
- "Fascetti, Aldo". Enciclopedia Italiana. Vol. III Appendice. Treccani. 1961.
- Gaudio, Angelo (1995). "FASCETTI, Aldo". Dizionario Biografico degli Italiani. Vol. 45. Rome: Treccani.
