= Marco Filippeschi =

Italian politician (born 1960)

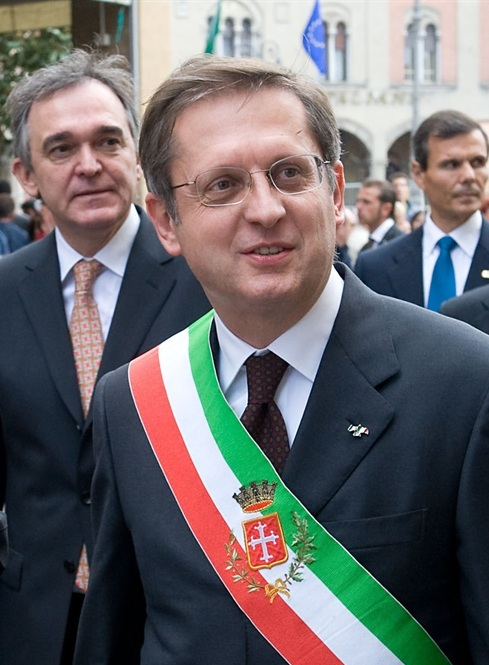

Mayor of Pisa
- In office 29 April 2008 – 27 June 2018
- Preceded by: Paolo Fontanelli
- Succeeded by: Michele Conti

President of the Province of Pisa
- In office 14 October 2014 – 31 October 2018
- Preceded by: Andrea Pieroni
- Succeeded by: Massimiliano Angori

Member of the Chamber of Deputies
- In office 30 May 2001 – 28 April 2008

Personal details
- Born: 2 July 1960 (age 65) Fauglia, Province of Pisa, Italy
- Party: Italian Communist Party (1980-1991); Democratic Party of the Left (1991-1998); Democrats of the Left (1998-2007); Democratic Party (since 2007)
- Profession: employee

Marco Filippeschi (born 2 July 1960) is an Italian politician.

== Life and career ==
Filippeschi was elected with the Democrats of the Left at the 2001 Italian general election, serving as a member of the Chamber of Deputies for two legislatures (XIV, XV). He has been a member of the Democratic Party since 2007.

He was elected mayor of Pisa on 29 April 2008 and re-elected for a second term on 26 May 2013.

He served as president of the Province of Pisa from 14 October 2014 to 31 October 2018.

== See also ==
- 2001 Italian general election
- 2006 Italian general election
- 2008 Italian local elections
- 2013 Italian local elections
- List of mayors of Pisa

Political offices
Preceded by Paolo Fontanelli	Mayor of Pisa; 2008–2018	Succeeded by Michele Conti
Preceded by Andrea Pieroni	President of the Province of Pisa; 2014–2018	Succeeded by Massimiliano Angori
