= Pisa79 =

The March Against Violence Against Homosexuals (Italian: Marcia contro la violenza sugli/sulle omosessuali), also known as Pisa79, held in Pisa on November 24, 1979, was a protest march against anti-LGBT violence and aimed at promoting LGBT rights, as a reaction to a homophobic murder and the general climate of anti-LGBT violence. The event was organized by local LGBT collective Orfeo. As the first homosexual pride demonstration authorized by a Questura (the local provincial headquarters of Italian police) and sponsored by a municipality, it is considered to be Italy's first Gay pride march.

== Background ==
On Tuesday, May 22, 1979, five 16-year-old boys found a corpse, shot to death, in a pine forest near Livorno. At the same time, the mother and brother of 48-year old Dario Taddei of Santa Croce sull'Arno filed a missing person's report after he had left Sunday afternoon and had not returned. The dead man was later identified as Taddei by his mother and brother. Based on the testimonies, that Taddei had friends in "homosexual environments", investigators linked the murder to homophobia.

On July 26, 1979, Pisa's gay collective and Radical Association (Associazione Radicale Pisana) published a joint statement in newspaper "L'Unità", denouncing the protracted and increasingly strong climate of discrimination, exclusion and violence against the LGBT community, and claimed the right to free expression of gender and sexual orientation and called on institutions to take a clear and concrete position with respect to the "Gay issue" (questione Gay).

On November 1, 1979, at 11 a.m. on the premises of the former occupied convent at 61 Via del Colosseo in Rome, a press conference was held to open the 2nd National Convention of Homosexuals. Felix, a Fiat worker and journalist for the gay newspaper "Lambda", opened the conference, outlining the goals and schedule of events. The convention included debates, film screenings, theatrical performances, photo exhibitions, audiovisuals, poetry readings, a day in homage to Pasolini and a gay march, without the participation of organizations and political parties.

Following the conference presentation, a debate was opened regarding the document presented on Lambda, which concerned the construction of a representative press organ of the homosexual movement. The discussion continued within the committees over the next few days and resulted in a final motion discussed at the assembly on November 4, where the creation of a widespread structure of collectives and the running of a "gay page" titled "Pagina frocia" in the far-left newspaper Lotta Continua was proposed. The march planned for November 4 was not authorized by the Questura, so the mobilization was postponed to the planned November 24 demonstration in Pisa.

== Events ==
The concentration was set for 3 p.m. on November 24, in Piazza dei Cavalieri, and at 4 p.m. a procession of about 500 people made its way through the city following Via Ulisse Dini, Borgo Stretto, Ponte di Mezzo, Lungarno Gambacorti, Via Mazzini, Piazza Vittorio Emanuele, Corso Italia and ended in Via di Banchi. The demonstration was received mostly positively by the city residents, although there were isolated incidents of protest with the throwing of water and food. At the end of the mobilization, 6 p.m., a closing meeting was convened in the municipal library, where the event was discussed and a play was improvised by Ciro Cascina. At 9:30 p.m., a gay party was held in the deconsecrated church of San Bernardino on Pietro Gori Street.

The next day at 9 a.m., a national convention on "Homosexual Movement and Mass Media" was held at the headquarters of far-left party Democrazia Proletaria at 12 San Frediano Street. The convention posed as a continuation of what had been discussed at the II national convention in Rome on the need to find a point of agreement within the movement in handling relations with the mass media. However, the results of the round table were not satisfactory, and since no common point of view emerged, the discussion was left to individual collectives. At the same time, the first meeting of the homosexual teachers' coordination was held, at which the groundwork was laid for organizing a subsequent national conference at which to gather proposals for regulations on sexual information and the fight against sexual orientation discrimination within schools.

On November 10, 2009, on the 30th anniversary of the march, the Pisa '79 Committee (Comitato Pisa '79) was created to promote four days dedicated to the reconstruction, promotion and dissemination of the events of November 24 and 25, 1979. The planned initiatives were a conference, an exhibition, the publication of materials on the web and the production of a documentary.

The conference, hosted by the Municipal Library of Pisa on Saturday, Nov. 28, 2009, delved into the historical context of the 1979 Pisa event and the path taken by the Italian LGBT community 30 years after that first “descent into the streets.” A theatrical performance by Ciro Cascina was also held at the close of the conference. The exhibition, hosted by the Pisa Municipal Library from Nov. 25 to 28, 2009, illustrated a chronology of events related to homosexual rights from the 1960s through 1982 (the year of the “taking of the Cassero”) with a focus on photographic images, documents and newspaper articles related to the days of Nov. 24 and 25, 1979. Also on that occasion, the Committee produced the documentary "Pisa 1979-2009. La prima marcia gay 30 anni dopo" (Pisa 1979–2009. The first gay march 30 years later), that was released April 19, 2010 and presented at the Turin GLBT Film Festival - From Sodom to Hollywood. The documentary collects the testimonies of some of the participants in the event.
