= Paolo Fontanelli =

Italian politician (born 1953)

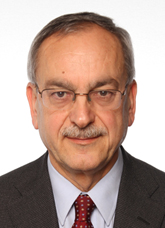

Member of the Chamber of Deputies
- In office 29 April 2008 – 22 March 2018

Mayor of Pisa
- In office 14 December 1998 – 13 February 2008
- Preceded by: Piero Floriani
- Succeeded by: Marco Filippeschi

Member of the Regional Council of Tuscany
- In office 7 June 1995 – 21 December 1998

Personal details
- Born: 5 July 1953 (age 72) Santa Maria a Monte, Province of Pisa, Italy
- Party: Italian Communist Party (1975-1991); Democratic Party of the Left (1991-1998); Democrats of the Left (1998-2007); Democratic Party (2007-2017); Article One (2017-2023)
- Profession: employee

Paolo Fontanelli (born 5 July 1953) is an Italian politician.

== Career ==
Fontanelli was elected to the Regional Council of Tuscany in 1995. He was elected mayor of Pisa on 14 December 1998 and re-elected for a second term on 27 May 2003.

He was a member of the Democratic Party from 2007 until 2017, when he joined Article One.

Fontanelli was elected at the 2008 Italian general election, serving as member of the Chamber of Deputies for two legislatures (XVI, XVII).

== See also ==
- 2008 Italian general election
- 2013 Italian general election
- List of mayors of Pisa

Political offices
Preceded by Piero Floriani	Mayor of Pisa; 1998–2008	Succeeded by Marco Filippeschi
