= List of mayors of Pisa =

Mayor of Pisa
- Sindaco di Pisa

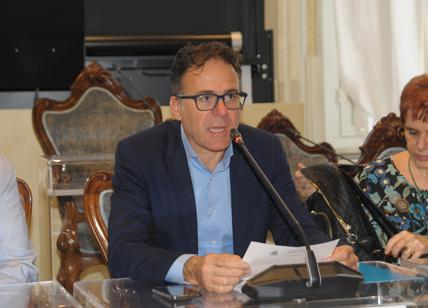
- Incumbent; Michele Conti since 27 June 2018
- Appointer: Popular election
- Term length: 5 years, renewable once
- Inaugural holder: Angelo Del Punta
- Formation: 1865
- Website: Official website

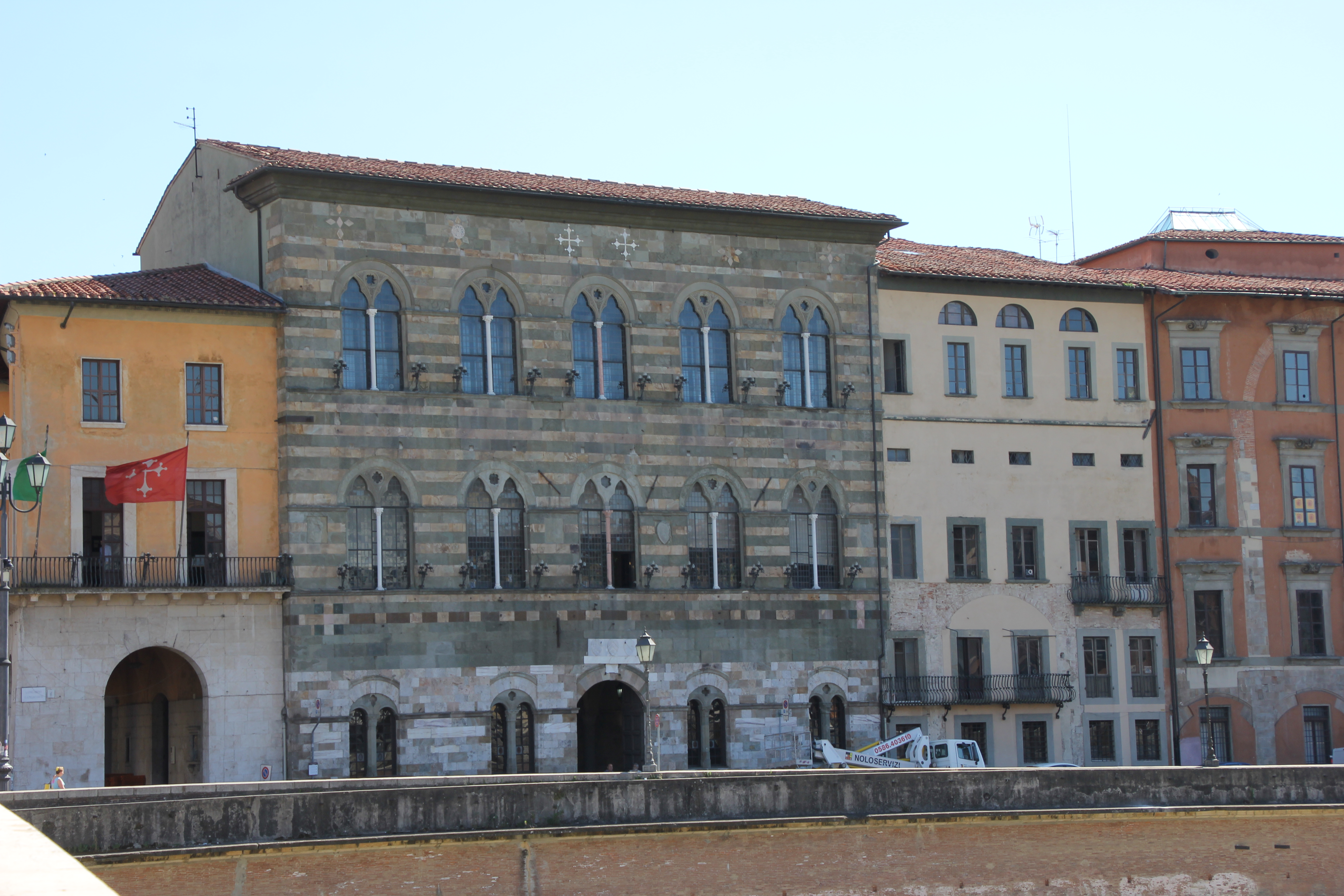
Palazzo Gambacorti is Pisa' City Hall

The mayor of Pisa is an elected politician who, along with the Pisa's city council, is accountable for the strategic government of Pisa in Tuscany, Italy.

Michele Conti (Lega) became mayor on 27 June 2018.

== Overview ==
The mayor is elected by the population of Pisa, who also elect the members of the city council, controlling the mayor's policy guidelines and is able to enforce his resignation by a motion of no confidence. The mayor is entitled to appoint and release the members of his government.

Since 1994 the mayor is elected directly by Pisa's electorate: in all mayoral elections in Italy in cities with a population higher than 15,000 the voters express a direct choice for the mayor or an indirect choice voting for the party of the candidate's coalition. If no candidate receives at least 50% of votes, the top two candidates go to a second round after two weeks. The election of the City Council is based on a direct choice for the candidate with a preference vote: the candidate with the majority of the preferences is elected. The number of the seats for each party is determined proportionally.

== Kingdom of Italy (1861–1946) ==
In 1865, the Kingdom of Italy created the office of the mayor of Pisa (Sindaco di Pisa), appointed by the King himself. From 1889 to 1926 the mayor was elected by the city council. In 1926, the Fascist dictatorship abolished mayors and City councils, replacing them with an authoritarian Podestà chosen by the National Fascist Party. The office of mayor was restored in 1944 during the Allied occupation.

	Mayor	Term start	Term end	Party
1	Angiolo Del Punta	1865	1867	
2	Giuseppe Bianchi	1869	1873	
3	Mario Rizzari	1873	1876	
4	Tommaso Simonelli	1877	1884	
5	Leopoldo Peverada	1884	1889	
6	Angiolo Nardi Dei	1889	1895	
7	Giuseppe Gambini	1895	1899	
8	Giuseppe Raffaello Cerrai	1899	1900	
9	Vittorio Frascani	1900	1901	
(7)	Giuseppe Gambini	1901	1903	
(9)	Vittorio Frascani	1903	1904	
10	Dario Baldi	1904	1905	
–	Vittorio Menzinger	1905	1906	Royal commissioner
11	Alessandro D'Ancona	1906	1907	
(7)	Giuseppe Gambini	1907	1910	
12	Francesco Buonamici	1910	1914	
(9)	Vittorio Frascani	1914	1920	
13	Francesco Pardi	1920	1922	
14	Guido Buffarini Guidi	1922	1925	National Fascist Party
Fascist Podestà (1926–1943)
1	Guido Buffarini Guidi	1927	1933	National Fascist Party
2	Giovanni D'Achiardi	1936	1939	National Fascist Party
3	Carlo Zanetto Lami	1939	1943	National Fascist Party
Allied occupation (1944–1946)
15	Italo Bargagna	1944	1946	Italian Communist Party

== Republic of Italy (since 1946) ==
=== City Council election (1946-1994) ===
From 1946 to 1994, the Mayor of Pisa was elected by the City's Council.

	Mayor	Term start	Term end	Party	Election
1	Italo Bargagna	31 March 1946	11 June 1951	PCI	1946
2	Renato Pagni	11 June 1951	1 July 1956	DC	1951
3	Italo Pellegrini	1 July 1956	14 August 1956	DC	1956
4	Vittorio Galluzzi	14 August 1956	17 December 1958	PSI	1956
(2)	Renato Pagni	17 December 1958	7 July 1960	DC	1958
5	Enrico Pistolesi	7 July 1960	2 January 1961	DC	1958
(4)	Vittorio Galluzzi	2 January 1961	14 October 1961	PSI	1960
Special Prefectural Commissioner tenure (14 October 1961–1 July 1962)
6	Umberto Viale	1 July 1962	14 August 1964	DC	1962
(2)	Renato Pagni	14 August 1964	14 March 1965	DC	1962
7	Roberto Supino	14 March 1965	14 May 1965	PSDI	1962
(2)	Renato Pagni	14 May 1965	6 July 1966	DC	1962
(2)	Renato Pagni	6 July 1966	14 February 1967	DC	1966
Special Prefectural Commissioner tenure (14 February 1967–1 July 1967)
8	Giulio Battistini	1 July 1967	14 December 1968	DC	1967
9	Fausta Giani Cecchini	14 December 1968	8 July 1970	PSI	1967
10	Franco Gemignani	8 July 1970	14 October 1970	DC	1970
11	Giuseppe Prosperi	14 October 1970	14 April 1971	DC	1970
12	Vinicio Bernardini	14 April 1971	14 June 1971	PCI	1970
(8)	Giulio Battistini	14 June 1971	14 July 1971	DC	1970
13	Elia Lazzari	14 July 1971	15 July 1975	PCI	1970
13	Elia Lazzari	15 July 1975	14 May 1976	PCI	1975
14	Luigi Bulleri	14 May 1976	30 July 1980	PCI	1975
14	Luigi Bulleri	30 July 1980	14 May 1983	PCI	1980
(12)	Vinicio Bernardini	14 May 1983	14 September 1985	PCI	1980
15	Oriano Ripoli	14 September 1985	15 July 1986	PSI	1985
16	Giacomino Granchi	15 July 1986	20 January 1990	PSI	1985
Special Prefectural Commissioner tenure (20 January 1990–16 July 1990)
17	Sergio Cortopassi	16 July 1990	1 September 1994	PSI	1990
Special Prefectural Commissioner tenure (1 September 1994–24 November 1994)

=== Direct election (since 1994) ===
Since 1994, under provisions of new local administration law, the Mayor of Pisa is chosen by direct election, originally every four, and since 2003 every five years.

	Mayor	Took office	Left office	Party	Coalition	Election
18	Piero Floriani (1942–2018)	24 November 1994	14 December 1998	PDS	PDS • PRC • FdV	1994
19	Paolo Fontanelli (b. 1953)	14 December 1998	27 May 2003	DS; PD	The Olive Tree (DS-PPI-FdV-PdCI-SDI)	1998
19	Paolo Fontanelli (b. 1953)	27 May 2003	13 February 2008 (Note: Resigned in order to participate in the national general election.)	DS; PD	The Olive Tree (DS-DL-PdCI-SDI)	2003
Special Prefectural Commissioner tenure (13 February 2008 – 29 April 2008)
20	Marco Filippeschi (b. 1960)	29 April 2008	28 May 2013	PD	PD • PSI • IdV and leftist lists	2008
20	Marco Filippeschi (b. 1960)	28 May 2013	27 June 2018	PD	PD • SEL and leftist lists	2013
21	Michele Conti (b. 1970)	27 June 2018	30 May 2023	Lega; FdI	Lega • FI • FdI	2018
21	Michele Conti (b. 1970)	30 May 2023	Incumbent	Lega; FdI	FdI • Lega • FI	2023
