= Vinicio Bernardini =

Italian politician (1926–2020)

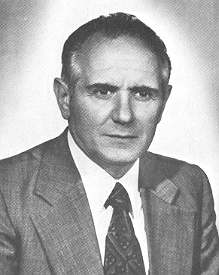
Bernardini

Vinicio Bernardini (16 July 1926 – 23 November 2020) was an Italian politician.

== Biography ==
He served as a Deputy from 1976 to 1983 and Mayor of Pisa for two terms.

Bernardini died on 23 November 2020, of complications from COVID-19. He was 94.
