= Michele Conti (politician) =

Italian politician

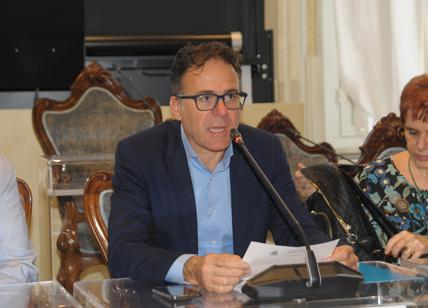

Mayor of Pisa
- Incumbent
- Assumed office 27 June 2018
- Preceded by: Marco Filippeschi

Personal details
- Born: 3 March 1970 (age 56) Pisa, Italy
- Party: Brothers of Italy (since 2026)
- Other political affiliations: MSI (till 1995); AN (1995–2009); Lega (2018-2026)
- Education: University of Pisa
- Profession: Agronomist

Michele Conti (born 3 March 1970) is an Italian politician, who is currently serving as the Mayor of Pisa since May 2018.

He was a member of right-wing party National Alliance from 1995 to 2009 and he served as municipal councillor in Pisa. He ran for Mayor of Pisa at the 2018 Italian local elections, supported by a centre-right coalition formed by Lega Nord, Forza Italia and Brothers of Italy. He won and took office on 27 June 2018.

== Biography ==
Born in Pisa in 1970, he spent most of his childhood in Ghezzano, a hamlet of San Giuliano Terme. After completing a degree in agronomy, he became a certified agronomist. In 1996, he began his professional career at the Experimental Zooprophylactic Institute of Lazio and Tuscany, first working at the Grosseto branch and then moving to the Pisa branch.

Formerly director of the Pisa Agricultural Consortium, he is now an executive at the Tirreno Consortium, now known as Consorzi Agrari d'Italia.

== See also ==
- 2018 Italian local elections
- List of mayors of Pisa

Political offices
| Preceded by Marco Filippeschi | Mayor of Pisa since 2018 | Incumbent |
