= Province of Pisa =

Province of Italy

Coordinates: 43°43′N 10°24′E

Province of Pisa Provincia di Pisa (Italian)
- Province
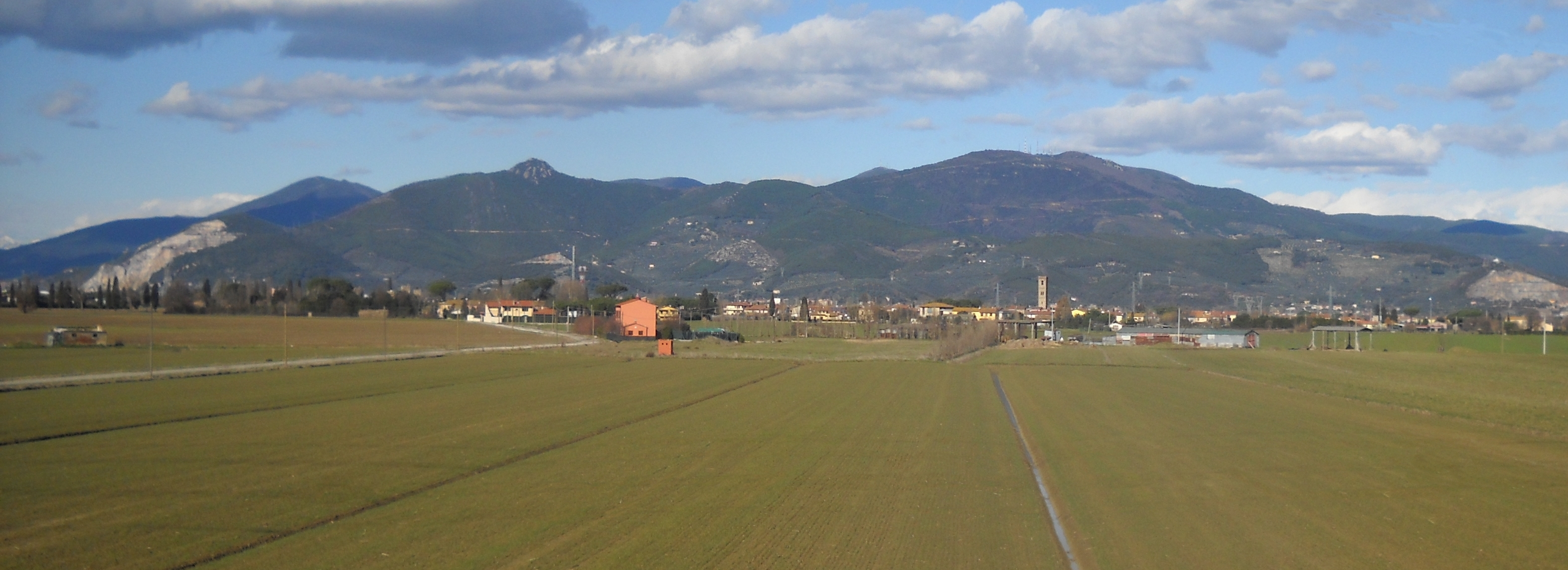
- Panoramic view of Latignano

- Flag Coat of arms

- Location of the province of Pisa in Italy
- Country: Italy
- Region: Tuscany
- Capital(s): Pisa
- Municipalities: 37

Government
  - President: Massimiliano Angori (PD)

Area
  - Total: 2,444.72 km^{2} (943.91 sq mi)

Population (2026)
  - Total: 419,588
  - Density: 171.630/km^{2} (444.520/sq mi)

GDP
  - Total: €12.429 billion (2015)
  - Per capita: €29,497 (2015)
- Time zone: UTC+1 (CET)
  - Summer (DST): UTC+2 (CEST)
- Postal code: 56010, 56011, 56017, 56019-56022, 56025, 56027, 56029-56038, 56040-56043, 56046, 56048
- Telephone prefix: 050, 0565, 0571, 0586, 0587, 0588
- Vehicle registration: PI
- ISTAT code: 050
- Website: www.provincia.pisa.it

The Province of Pisa (Italian: Provincia di Pisa) is a province in the region of Tuscany in central Italy. Its capital is the city of Pisa. It has a population of 419,588 in an area of 2,444.72 square kilometres (943.91 sq mi) across its 37 municipalities.

With a history that dates to the Etruscans and Phoenicians, the province achieved considerable power and influence in the Mediterranean in the 12th and 13th centuries. Pisa, the provincial capital, is known for its Leaning Tower, and other historic landmarks that attract tourists.

== History ==
The area has a long maritime history dating back to the Etruscans, the Phoenicians and the Gauls. Under the Roman Empire, it was responsible for naval battles against the Ligurians, Gauls and Carthaginians, becoming a Roman colony in 180 B.C. and gaining further colonial independence under Julius Caesar. Thanks to its complex river system, with the fall of the Roman Empire, Pisa did not suffer unduly and was able to combat Saracen pirates. In 828, it launched an expedition against the north African coast while in 871, Pisan troops helped to defend Salerno from the Moors.

In the 11th century, Pisa became a republic, reaching its zenith in the 12th and 13th centuries when its navy controlled the western Mediterranean. As a Maritime Republic, its power extended well beyond the Italian peninsula. After first being an ally then a rival of the Republic of Genoa, it suffered defeat at the Battle of Meloria in 1284. As a result, it began to decline and in 1406 was annexed to Florence, becoming part of the Grand Duchy of Tuscany in the 16th century. In the 20th century, Pisa was hit hard by allied bombing and Nazi reprisals.

The current province descends from the Grand Duchy, while its territories are part of the former Maritime Republic of Pisa. In 1925, the municipalities of Bibbona, Campiglia Marittima, Castagneto Carducci, Cecina, Collesalvetti, Piombino, Rosignano Marittimo, Sassetta, and Suvereto were transferred to the Province of Livorno, and at the same time the municipalities of Castelfranco di Sotto, Montopoli in Val d'Arno, San Miniato, Santa Croce sull'Arno, and Santa Maria a Monte were acquired by the province of Florence. In 1938, the comune of Castellina Marittima bought a small slice of the territory of the municipality of Cecina, part of the province of Livorno, which was attributed to an administrative error.

== Geography ==
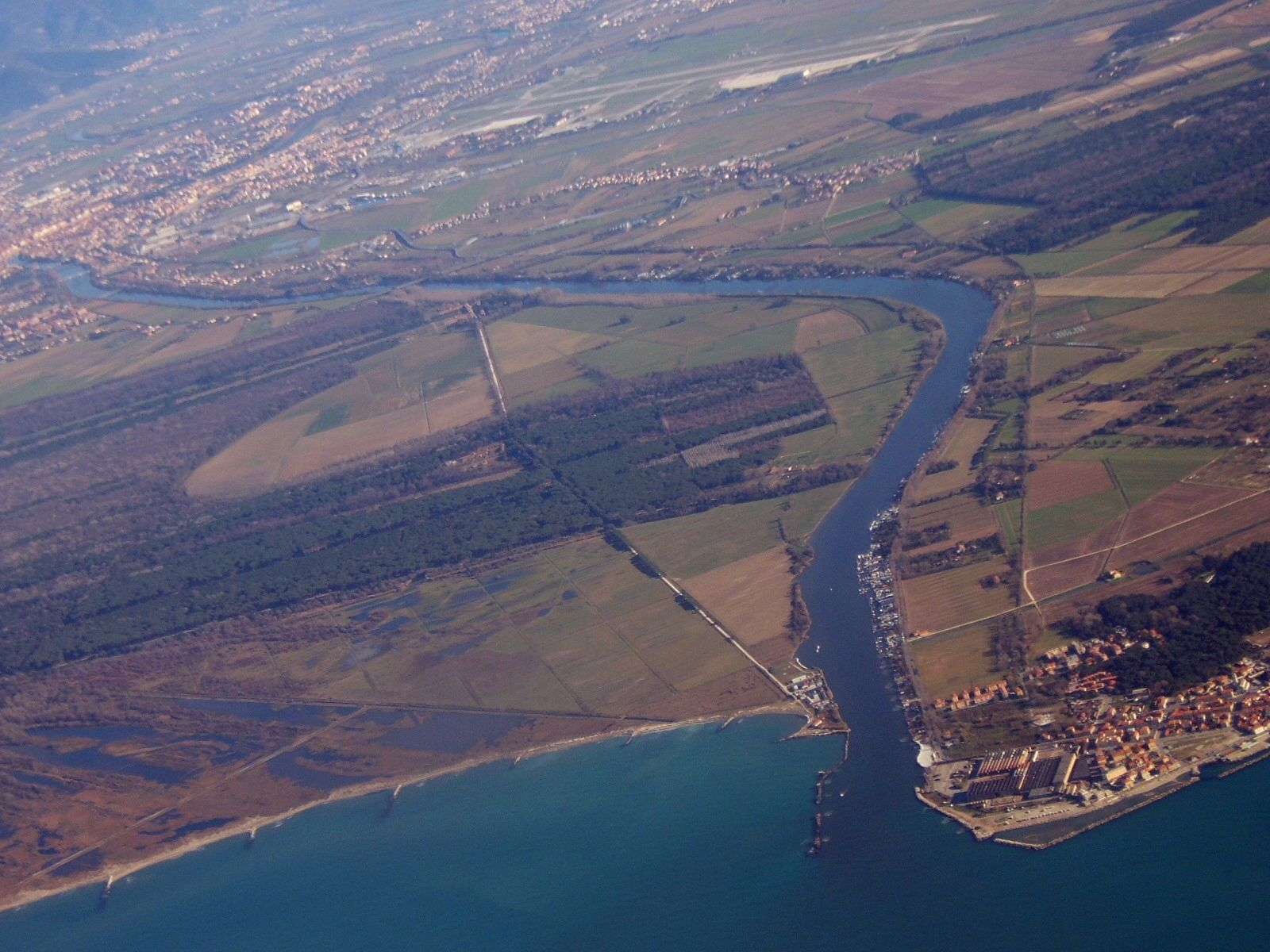
Mouth of the Arno River

Pisa Province extends from the alluvial plain of the Arno River, in western Tuscany, to the Ligurian Sea and has the shape of a gun upside down. It is bordered to the north by the province of Lucca, to the east by the Metropolitan City of Florence and province of Siena, to the south by province of Grosseto, and to the west by the province of Livorno and the Ligurian Sea. The province contains 39 comuni (municipalities). The most populous cities in the province as of 2013 are Pisa (86,494), Cascina (44,040), San Giuliano Terme (31,039), Pontedera (28,793), San Miniato (27,580), Ponsacco (15,503).

The northern area is mountainous, containing the Apennine mountain range of Mount Pisano, adjacent to the extreme offshoot of the Apuan Alps, that separates the province of Pisa from Lucca. The highest point of Monte Pisano range and of the province is at Monte Serra (917 m or 3,009 ft). The Pisan coast, extends for about 15 km (9.3 mi), and includes the following locations: Calambrone, Tirrenia and Marina di Pisa in the Municipality of Pisa, a stretch of coast about 1 km (0.62 mi), protected as a park and administered by the City of San Giuliano Terme; Vecchiano Marina, in the municipality of Vecchiano, is also located in the park. The area of Pisa is flat, but, a few miles further south, in the southern part of the province, is classic Tuscan landscape consisting of hills, forests and ancient villages. Of particular note in the south is the Val di Cecina, the valley of the Cecina River, and the ancient city of Volterra to the west. The southern area of the province is hilly, containing the peak of Monte Aia dei Diavoli (867m).

== Government ==
=== List of presidents ===
List of presidents of the province since 2014, the year of the Delrio reform.

President	Term start	Term end	Party
Marco Filippeschi	14 October 2014	31 October 2018	PD
Massimiliano Angori	31 October 2018	Incumbent	PD

=== Municipalities ===
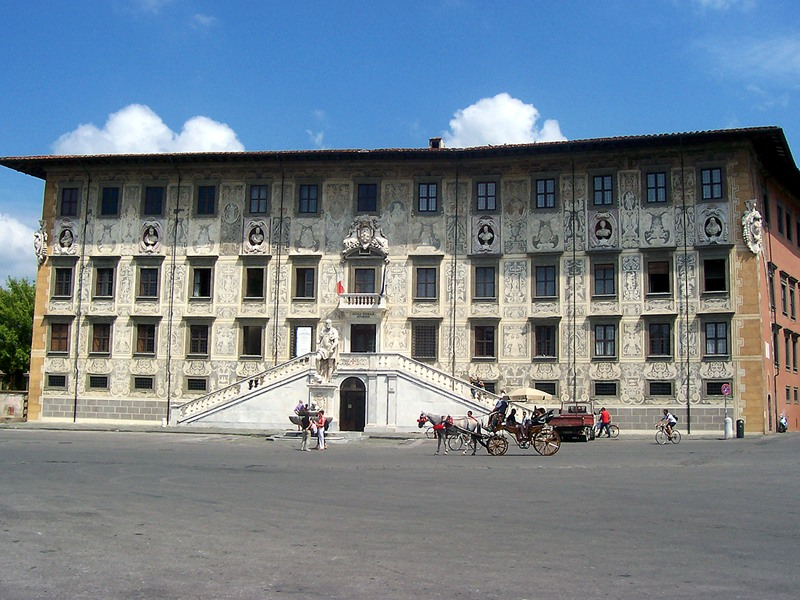
Carovana Palace, Pisa

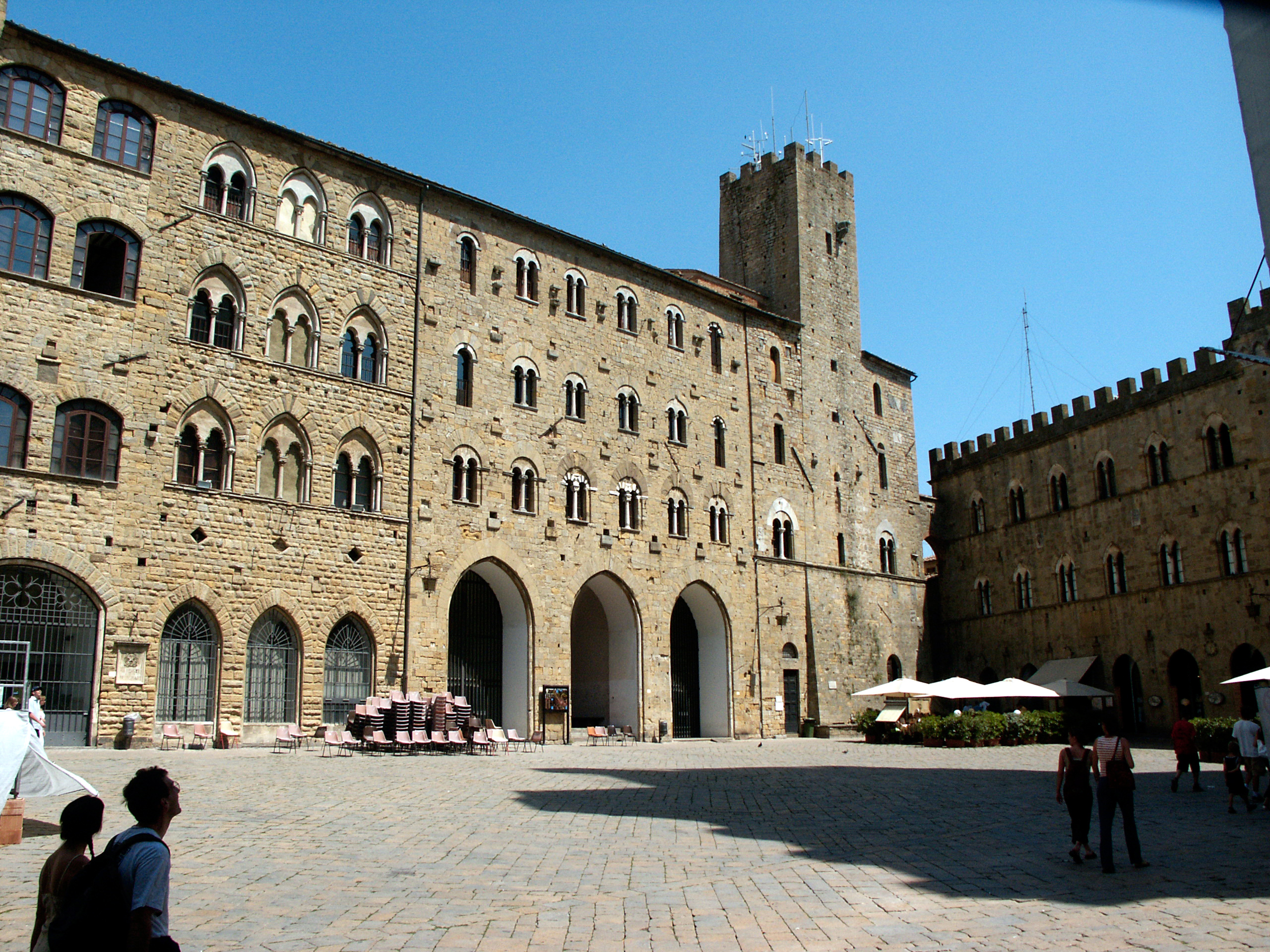
Piazza del Priori, Volterra

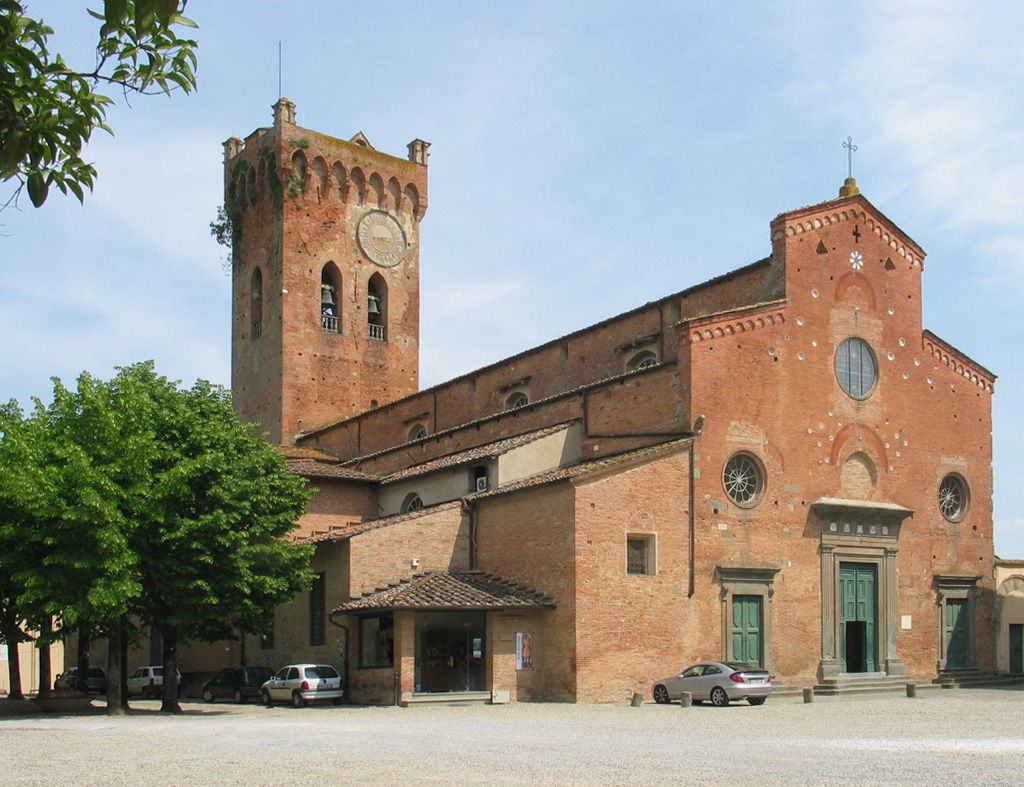
San Miniato Cathedral

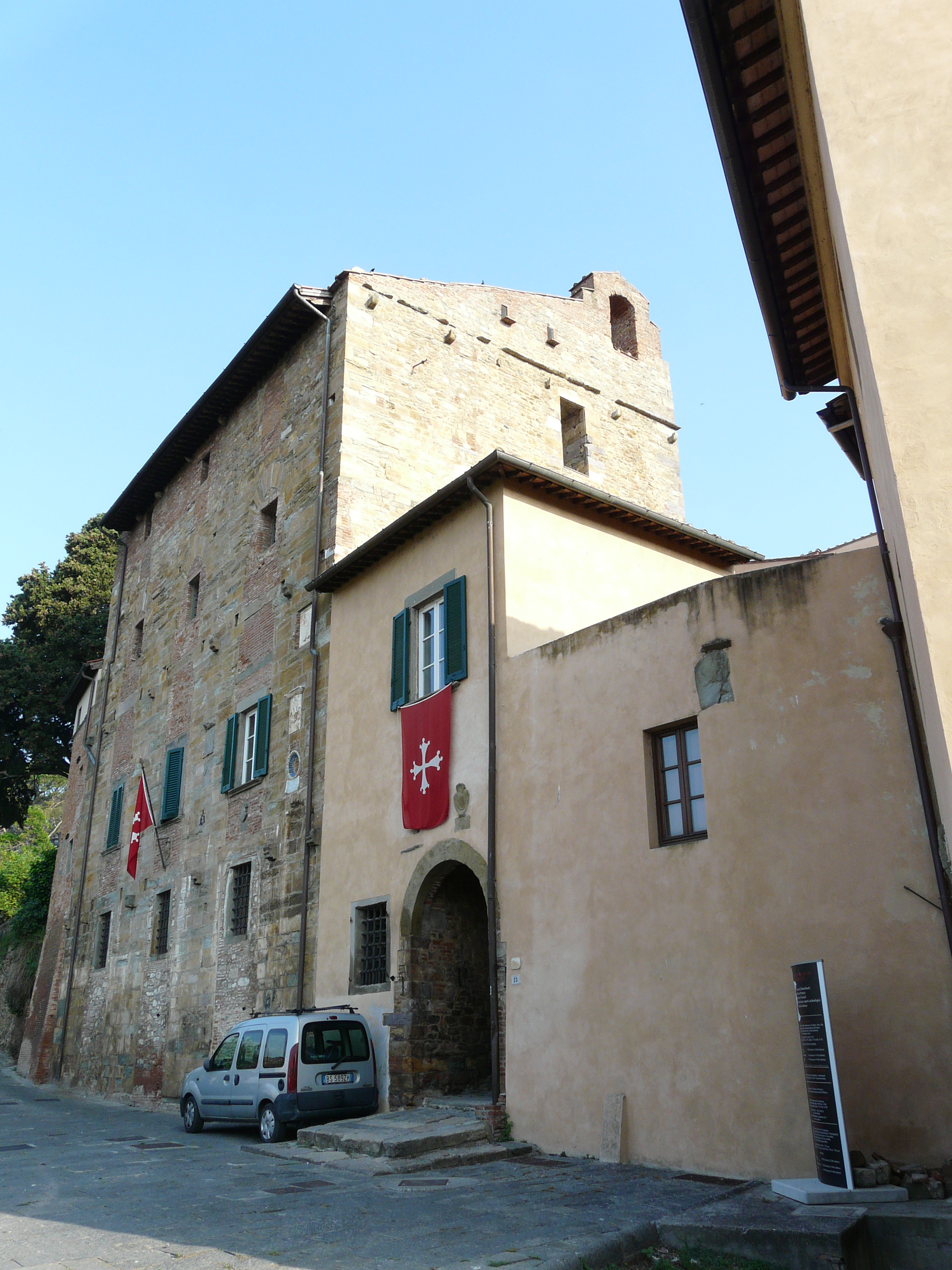
Vicopisano

The province has 37 municipalities:

- Bientina
- Buti
- Calci
- Calcinaia
- Capannoli
- Casale Marittimo
- Casciana Terme Lari
- Cascina
- Castelfranco di Sotto
- Castellina Marittima
- Castelnuovo di Val di Cecina
- Chianni
- Crespina Lorenzana
- Fauglia
- Guardistallo
- Lajatico
- Montecatini Val di Cecina
- Montescudaio
- Monteverdi Marittimo
- Montopoli in Val d'Arno
- Orciano Pisano
- Palaia
- Peccioli
- Pisa
- Pomarance
- Ponsacco
- Pontedera
- Riparbella
- San Giuliano Terme
- San Miniato
- Santa Croce sull'Arno
- Santa Luce
- Santa Maria a Monte
- Terricciola
- Vecchiano
- Vicopisano
- Volterra

== Demographics ==
As of 2026, the population is 419,588, of which 49.1% are male, and 50.9% are female. Minors make up 14.3% of the population, and seniors make up 25.9%.

Historical population

Year	Pop.	±%
1861	239,588	—
1871	264,154	+10.3%
1881	279,904	+6.0%
1901	311,047	+11.1%
1911	323,742	+4.1%
1921	330,477	+2.1%
1931	335,049	+1.4%
1936	341,428	+1.9%

Year	Pop.	±%
1951	350,002	+2.5%
1961	362,396	+3.5%
1971	375,933	+3.7%
1981	388,800	+3.4%
1991	385,285	−0.9%
2001	384,555	−0.2%
2011	411,190	+6.9%
2021	417,041	+1.4%

Source: ISTAT

=== Immigration ===
As of 2025, immigrants make up 13.2% of the total population. The 5 largest foreign countries of birth are Albania, Romania, Senegal, Morocco, and Ukraine.

== Economy ==
The province of Pisa has a wide variety of companies and organisations in the public and private sectors. One of the main areas of production is leather and footwear, where some 800 enterprises employing about 10,000 workers manufacture 35% of the Italy's total output in the sector. Since 2003, clothing has also been under development. There are also a number of enterprises in the chemical sector, while pharmaceuticals are also a strong sector. Catalysed by the CNR national research authority, facilities have been developed in Cascina, Pontedera, Santa Croce and Peccioli. There are also a number of software development firms and IT consultancies. While in recent years the economic crisis has reduced activities in most areas, agriculture had continued to grow, thanks to traditional crops, wine production and diversification in the fruit and vegetables sector. Other sectors that have recently prospered include technology (+3.4%) and glass (+4.5%) while there have been drops in footwear (-3.1%), metals (-2%), electronics and transport equipment (-9.7%), construction (-7.8%) and manufacturing (-8.2%).

Tourism is also an important contributor to the local economy but in 2013 it suffered from a reduction of 10.7% in the number of visitors to the province, with a reduction of 3.5% in nights spent in hotels.

== Main sights ==
In addition to the many sights in the city of Pisa (the Leaning Tower, the cathedral and the Carovana Palace), the province has many attractions in its other towns and villages. The historic city of Volterra is noted for its cathedral, its Etruscan and Roman remains and its museums, churches and palaces.

Set on the top of three hills, the medieval city of San Miniato has a cathedral, a fortress tower, two palaces and numerous old churches.

The province has many villages of interest, including Vicopisano with its fortress and towers, Calci with its Charterhouse (now a museum), and Buti with its castle and Medici villa.

Other points of interest include the Villa di Corliano in San Giuliano Terme, the gated medieval village of Castelfranco di Sotto, the towers of Montopoli in Val d'Arno, the bell-tower of Peccioli, and the Rocca Sillana fortress in Pomarance.
