= Timeline of Livorno =

The following is a timeline of the history of the city of Livorno in the Tuscany region of Italy.

== Prior to 20th century ==
- 1077 - Matilda of Tuscany tower built.
- 1284 - Naval Battle of Meloria (1284) fought near Livorno with the win of Genoa.
- 1303 - Livorno Lighthouse built.
- 1399 - Livorno sold by Pisa to the Visconti.
- 1407 - Livorno becomes part of the Republic of Genoa.
- 1421 - Livorno becomes part of the Republic of Florence.
- 1423 - Torre del Marzocco (tower) built.
- 1551 - Population: 749.
- 1571 - Port of Livorno construction begins.
- 1575 - Pisa-Livorno Navicelli channel created.
- 1603 - Synagogue of Livorno built.
- 1606
  - Livorno attains city status.
  - Cathedral of Saint Francis of Assisi built.
- 1626 - Monument of the Four Moors erected in the Piazza Micheli.
- 1630 - Venezia Nuova area development begins.
- 1645 - Old English Cemetery, Livorno established (until 1838).
- 1653 - 4 March: Naval battle fought near city during the First Anglo-Dutch War.
- 1691 - Port declared Free port.
- 1718 - Status as free port confirmed in the War of the Quadruple Alliance.
- 1742 - Earthquake.^{(it)}
- 1796 - French forces enter city.
- 1806 - Roman Catholic Diocese of Livorno established.
- 1813 - Attempted siege of Livorno by British and Italian forces.
- 1816 - Biblioteca Labronica (library) founded.
- 1825
  - Società medica di Livorno founded.
  - "British 'factory'" closes.
- 1840 - New Walls of Livorno built.
- 1842 - Cisternone (Livorno) built.
- 1847 - Teatro Carlo Goldoni (Livorno) (theatre) opens.
- 1848 - Cisternino di città built.
- 1849 - May: Siege of Livorno by Austrian forces during the First Italian War of Independence.
- 1856 - Santa Maria del Soccorso, Livorno opened.
- 1857 - June: Fire.
- 1867 - Livorno–Rome railway opened.
- 1868 - Livorno's free port status ends.
- 1871 - Population: 97,096.
- 1872 - Chamber of Commerce headquartered in the Palazzo della Dogana.
- 1881 - Italian Naval Academy established.
- 1899 - City Archive opens on Via Borra.

== 20th century ==
- 1901 - Population: 78,308.
- 1911 - Population: 105,315.
- 1915 - A.S. Livorno Calcio (football club) formed.
- 1920 - Scuola Labronica artists' group formed.
- 1921 - January: 1st Congress of the Communist Party of Italy held in Livorno.
- 1935
  - Ferrovia Pisa-Tirrenia-Livorno (railway) begins operating.
  - Stadio Edda Ciano Mussolini (stadium) opens.
- 1940 - Bombing of Livorno (1940-1945) in World War II begins.
- 1942 - Palazzo del Governo (Livorno) built.
- 1943 - City bombed by allied forces in World War II; cathedral demolished.
- 1944
  - Bombing by allied forces.
  - Furio Diaz becomes mayor.
- 1945 - Bombing of Livorno ends.
- 1953 - Cathedral reconstructed.
- 1954 - Nicola Badaloni becomes mayor.
- 1962 - New Synagogue of Livorno built.
- 1978 - Il Tirreno newspaper in publication.
- 1985 - May: Tuscan communal election, 1985 held.
- 1992 - Gianfranco Lamberti becomes mayor.
- 1994 - Museo civico Giovanni Fattori (museum) moves into the Villa Mimbelli.

== 21st century ==
- 2004 - Alessandro Cosimi becomes mayor.
- 2013 - Population: 156,998.
- 2014 - Filippo Nogarin becomes mayor.
- 2015 - Population: 159,431
- 2015 - 31 May: Tuscan regional election, 2015 held.
- 2019 - Luca Salvetti becomes mayor.

== See also ==
- History of Livorno and Timeline (in Italian)
- List of mayors of Livorno
- History of Tuscany

Other cities in the macroregion of Central Italy:^{(it)}

- Timeline of Ancona, Marche region
- Timeline of Arezzo, Tuscany region
- Timeline of Florence, Tuscany
- Timeline of Grosseto, Tuscany
- Timeline of Lucca, Tuscany
- Timeline of Perugia, Umbria region
- Timeline of Pisa, Tuscany
- Timeline of Pistoia, Tuscany
- Timeline of Prato, Tuscany
- Timeline of Rome, Lazio region
- Timeline of Siena, Tuscany

== Bibliography ==
=== in English ===
- John Ramsay McCulloch (1877), "Leghorn", A Dictionary, Practical, Theoretical, and Historical, of Commerce and Commercial Navigation, Hugh G. Reid, ed., London: Longmans, Green, and Co., hdl:2027/njp.32101079877088
- Ismar Elbogen (1904), "Leghorn", Jewish Encyclopedia, vol. 7, New York, hdl:2027/mdp.49015002282250
- Ashby, Thomas (1910). "Leghorn" . Encyclopædia Britannica. Vol. 16 (11th ed.). pp. 377–378.
- Benjamin Vincent (1910), "Leghorn", Haydn's Dictionary of Dates (25th ed.), London: Ward, Lock & Co., hdl:2027/uc2.ark:/13960/t41r6xh8t
- Roy Domenico (2002). "Tuscany: Livorno". Regions of Italy: a Reference Guide to History and Culture. Greenwood. pp. 329+. ISBN 0313307334.

=== in Italian ===
- Giuseppe Vivoli (1842), Annali di Livorno (in Italian) 1842-
- P. Volpi, Guida del Forestiere per la città e contorni di Livorno, 1846.
- Giuseppe Piombanti (1903). Guida storica ed artistica della città e dei dintorni di Livorno (in Italian). Bologna: Forni.
- P. Vigo, Livorno. Aspetti storici-artistici, Bergamo 1915.
- "Livorno", Enciclopedia Italiana, 1934
- G. Nudi. Storia urbanistica di Livorno: Dalle origini al secolo XVI (Venice, 1959)
- L. Bortolotti. Livorno dal 1748 al 1958: Profilo storico-urbanistico (Florence, 1970)
- A. Melosi, Resistenza, dopoguerra e ricostruzione a Livorno. 1944/48, S. Giovanni in Persiceto (Bo) 1984.
- D. Matteoni (1985), Livorno, Le città nella storia d'Italia (in Italian)
- Tiziana Noce (2004). Nella città degli uomini: donne e pratica della politica a Livorno fra guerra e ricostruzione (in Italian). Soveria Mannelli: Rubbettino Editore. ISBN 978-88-498-0843-8.
- A. Santini, 400 anni di Livorno, Pisa 2006.
- A. Prosperi (a cura di), Livorno 1606–1806. Luogo di incontro tra popoli e culture, Torino, Allemandi, 2009.
