= Giorgio Stoppa =

Italian physician, partisan and politician (1912–1985)

President of the Province of Livorno
- In office 1951–1956
- Succeeded by: Guido Torrigiani

Personal details
- Born: 22 September 1912 Livorno, Kingdom of Italy
- Died: 29 January 1985 (aged 72) Nice, France
- Party: Italian Communist Party (until 1957); Italian Socialist Party (1957–1985)
- Profession: Physician

Giorgio Stoppa (22 September 1912 – 29 January 1985) was an Italian physician, partisan, and politician. He served as the first elected president of the Province of Livorno after World War II from 1951 to 1956 and was a leading figure in the Italian Resistance in Tuscany.

== Early life and education ==
Stoppa was born in Livorno, the son of Corrado Stoppa. Following his father's profession, he graduated in medicine and worked as a physician at the military hospital of Livorno.

== Resistance activities ==
A member of the Italian Communist Party (PCI), Stoppa deserted the Italian army during World War II and joined the resistance movement in the Colline Metallifere area of Tuscany. He organized a partisan group that became known as the "Doctor's Formation", later officially designated as the 23rd Garibaldi Brigade "Guido Boscaglia" on 16 February 1944.

The brigade operated primarily around Montieri, Travale, and Gerfalco and included writer Carlo Cassola among its members. One of Stoppa's most notable actions, under the partisan nom de guerre "Paolo", was a raid on the local Fascist headquarters in Montieri in March 1944 aimed at capturing Fascist secretary Engels Lambardi, who had opened fire on demonstrators on 20 January, killing two civilians.

== Political career ==
Working closely with local Committees of National Liberation (CLN), Stoppa was in Livorno when the city was liberated by the U.S. 34th Infantry Division on 19 July 1944. With the agreement of the Allied Military Government and the local CLN, he was appointed the first mayor of Livorno following liberation. However, because his family was residing in Montecatini, which remained under German occupation at the time, he declined the position and served only nominally for ten days before being succeeded by Furio Diaz, who formed the city's first post-war municipal administration.

From 1951 to 1956, Stoppa served as president of the Province of Livorno during the province's first post-war legislature.

Following the Hungarian Revolution of 1956, he left the PCI and joined the Italian Socialist Party (PSI). He also served for many years as president of the Medical Association of the Province of Livorno.

== Sources ==
- Martufi, Piergiuseppe (1980). La tavola del pane. Storia della 23ª Brigata Garibaldi Guido Boscaglia. Siena: Edizione ANPI.
- Piazzano, Luis (1979). Leghorn. Decimo porto. Livorno: Debatte Editore.
