= Alessandro Franchi =

Alessandro Franchi may refer to:

- Alessandro Franchi (cardinal) (1819–1878), Italian cardinal and archbishop
- Alessandro Franchi (painter) (1838–1914), Italian painter
- Alessandro Franchi (politician) (born 1975), Italian president of Livorno
