= Capraia Isola =

- Comune
- Comune di Capraia Isola
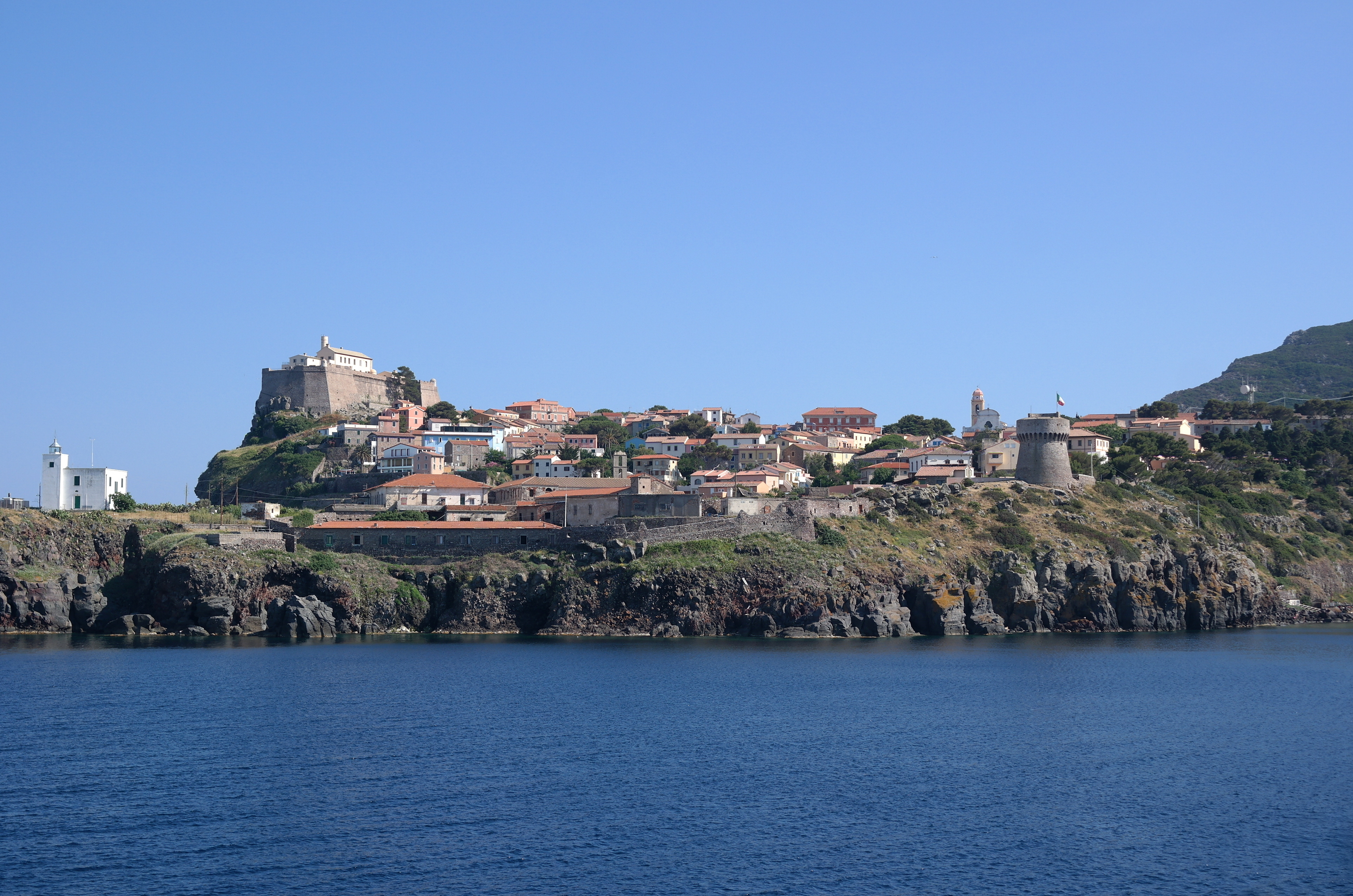

- Flag Coat of arms

- Location within Italy Location within Tuscany
- Coordinates: 43°3′N 9°51′E
- Country: Italy
- Region: Tuscany
- Province: Livorno (LI)
- Frazioni: Porto

Government
  - Mayor: Maria Ida Bessi

Area
  - Total: 19.33 km^{2} (7.46 sq mi)
- Elevation: 52 m (171 ft)

Population (2026)
  - Total: 347
  - Density: 18.0/km^{2} (46.5/sq mi)
- Demonym: Capraiesi
- Time zone: UTC+1 (CET)
  - Summer (DST): UTC+2 (CEST)
- Postal code: 57032
- Dialing code: 0586
- Website: Official website

Capraia Isola (Capraiese: Capraghja Isula, Corsican: Capraia Isula, Ligurian: Cravæa Îzoa) is a village and comune (municipality) in the Province of Livorno in the region of Tuscany in Italy, located on the island of the same name of the Tuscan Archipelago.

It is located 64 km from Livorno, 53 km from the Promontorio di Piombino, 37 km from Gorgona and 31 km from Corsica. With a population of 347, it is the least populous municipality in Italy among those with an outlet to the sea, and the least populous municipality in Tuscany overall.

Since 1996 it has been part of the Arcipelago Toscano National Park.

== Etymology ==
The name of the island referred, since classical antiquity, to the presence of goats (àighes): Àigilon (Αἴγιλον) in Ancient Greek, Capraria and Caprasia in Latin, Capraghja in the Capraiese dialect and Cravæa in Ligurian. Wild goats are now extinct on the island.

== Geography ==
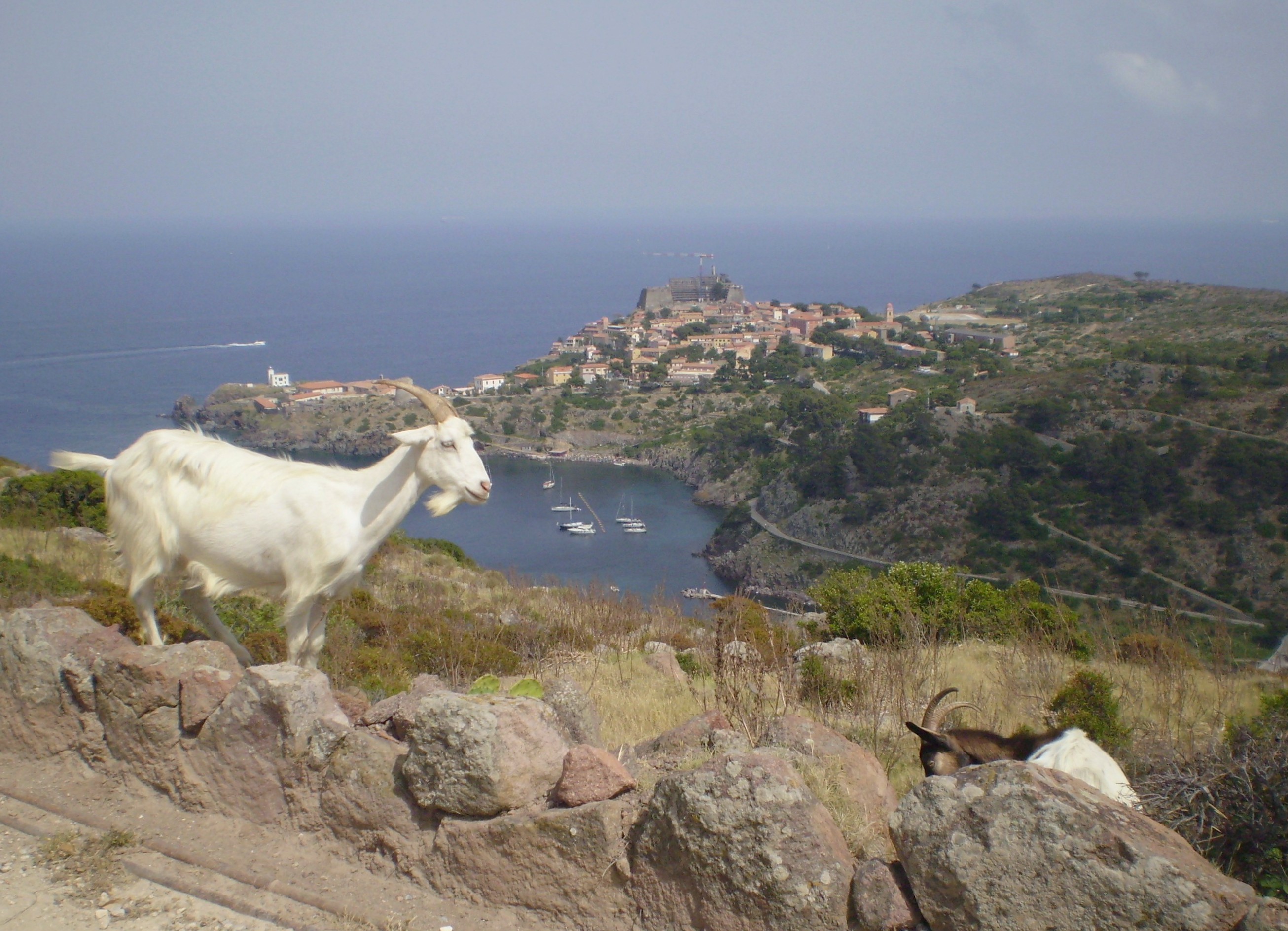
The country from above

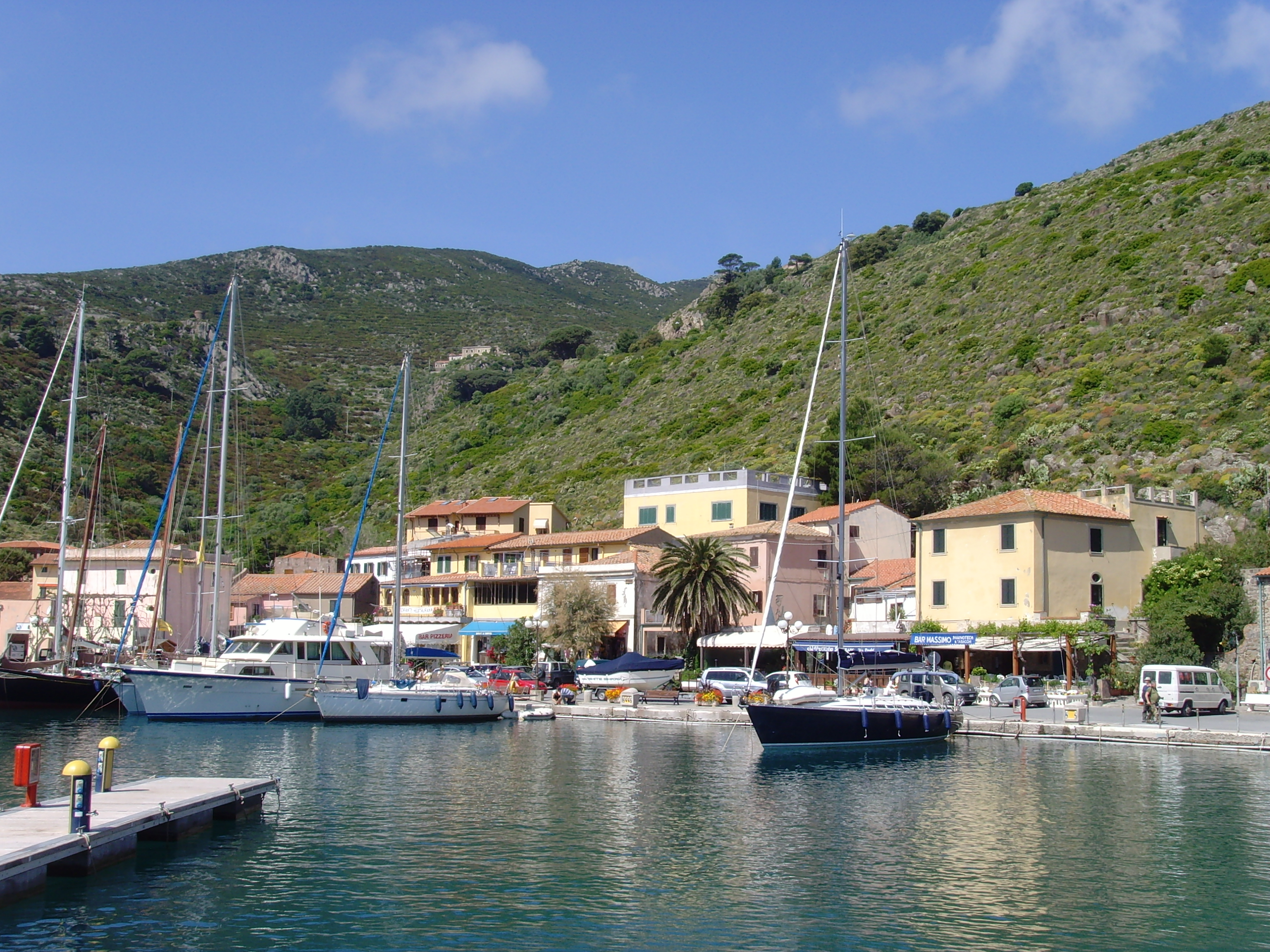
Capraia Marina

The island of Capraia is located in the Canale di Corsica (an arm of the sea on the border between the Ligurian Sea and the Tyrrhenian Sea), and is an island of volcanic origin, the third largest in the Tuscan archipelago after Elba and Giglio. It is approximately 8 km long (from Punta Teglia in the north to Punta dello Zenòbito in the south) and 4 km wide, for a surface area of 19.26 km². The perimeter is approximately 30 km. It is the island of the archipelago furthest from the mainland, being closer to the eastern coast of Corsica than to the Tuscan coast, from which it rises to the west of the Golfo di Baratti (Piombino). It is an island of volcanic origin, with an eruption cone still clearly visible today for half in the typical Cala Rossa, one of the most particular coves of the archipelago.

It has high and rocky coasts with no beaches (occasionally, in Cala della Mortola, a small sandy beach forms) and a small lake basin (called Stagnone or Laghetto) in the most internal mountainous area, with peaks along a central chain (which comes close to1 km from the coast) with peaks of over 400 metres. The highest point is Monte Castello, 447 metres high, which on the western side approaches the sea with cliffs while on the eastern side it descends more gently with small torrent valleys (vadi), the most important of which is the Vado del Porto, approximately 3 km long, which flows into the sea near the Porto di Capraia Isola. The coast is rocky and often inaccessible by land due to the lack of roads; caves and inlets open up along it, with rock pinnacles caused by water erosion.

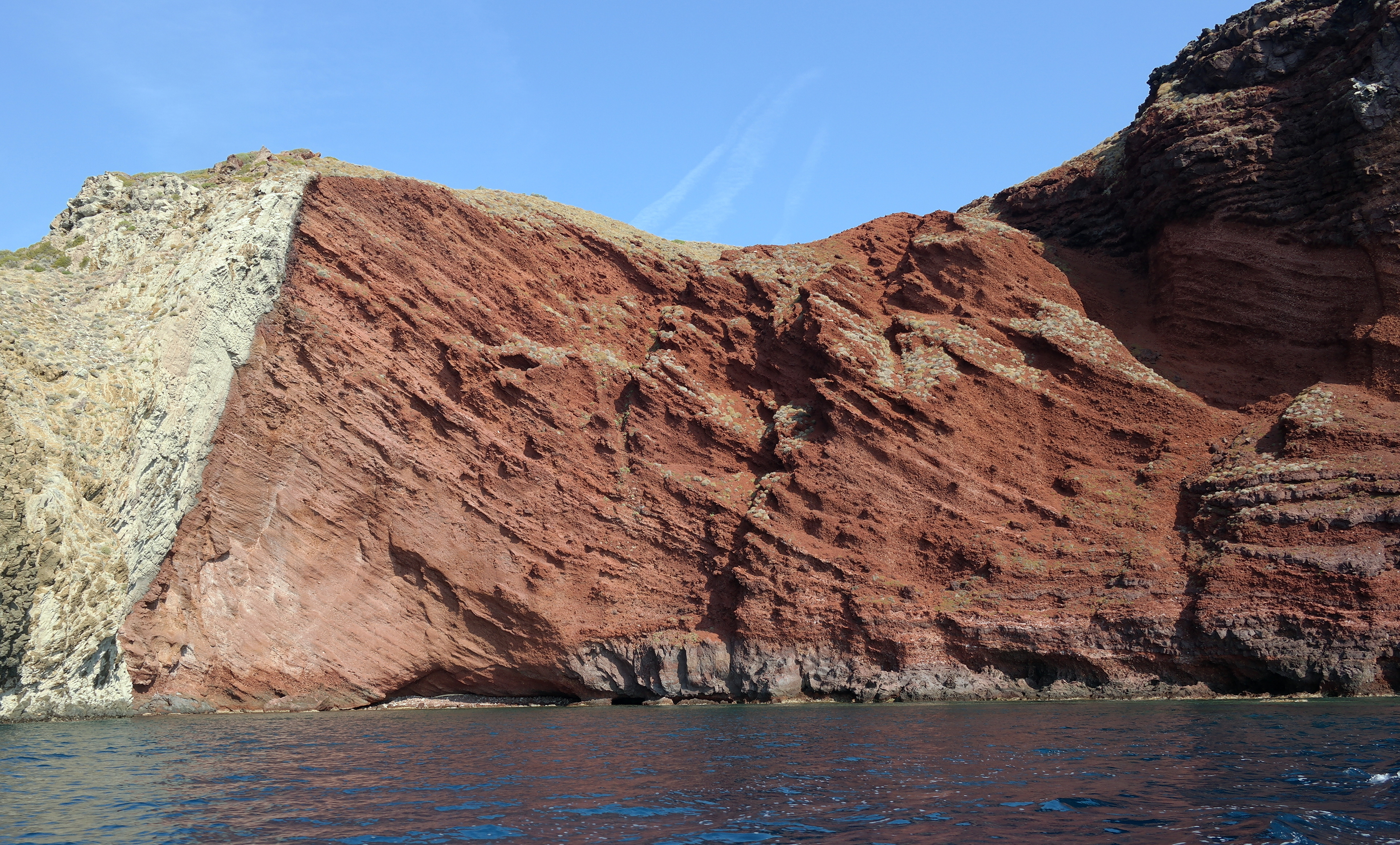
Cala Rossa (The Red Cove)

Geologically, the island's composition is predominantly characterized by andesite flows, combined with tuff and breccia, while at Punta dello Zenòbito, more recent basaltic rocks are found. At the southernmost tip, the remains of an ancient, no longer active volcano are visible, which left traces in the truncated cone-shaped rock walls, with colors ranging from red to black due to the accumulation of lava that settled on the cliffs (Cala Rossa).

== Demographics ==
As of 2026, the population is 347, of which 53.6% are male, and 46.4% are female. Minors make up 6.3% of the population, and seniors make up 33.7%.

Historical population

Year	Pop.	±%
1861	862	—
1871	576	−33.2%
1881	762	+32.3%
1901	560	−26.5%
1911	502	−10.4%
1921	561	+11.8%
1931	385	−31.4%
1936	341	−11.4%

Year	Pop.	±%
1951	465	+36.4%
1961	467	+0.4%
1971	323	−30.8%
1981	395	+22.3%
1991	267	−32.4%
2001	333	+24.7%
2011	394	+18.3%
2021	378	−4.1%

Source: ISTAT

=== Languages and dialects ===
Capraiese
- Capraien
- Capraghja Isula
- Region: Capraia Isola
- Ethnicity: Capraians
- Extinct: 20th century
- Language family: Indo-European: Italic; Latino-Faliscan; Latin; Romance; Italo-Western; Italo-Dalmatian; Italo-Romance; Tuscan; Corsican; Capraiese
- Writing system: Latin

Language codes
- ISO 639-3: –
- Linguist List: cos-cap
- Glottolog: None
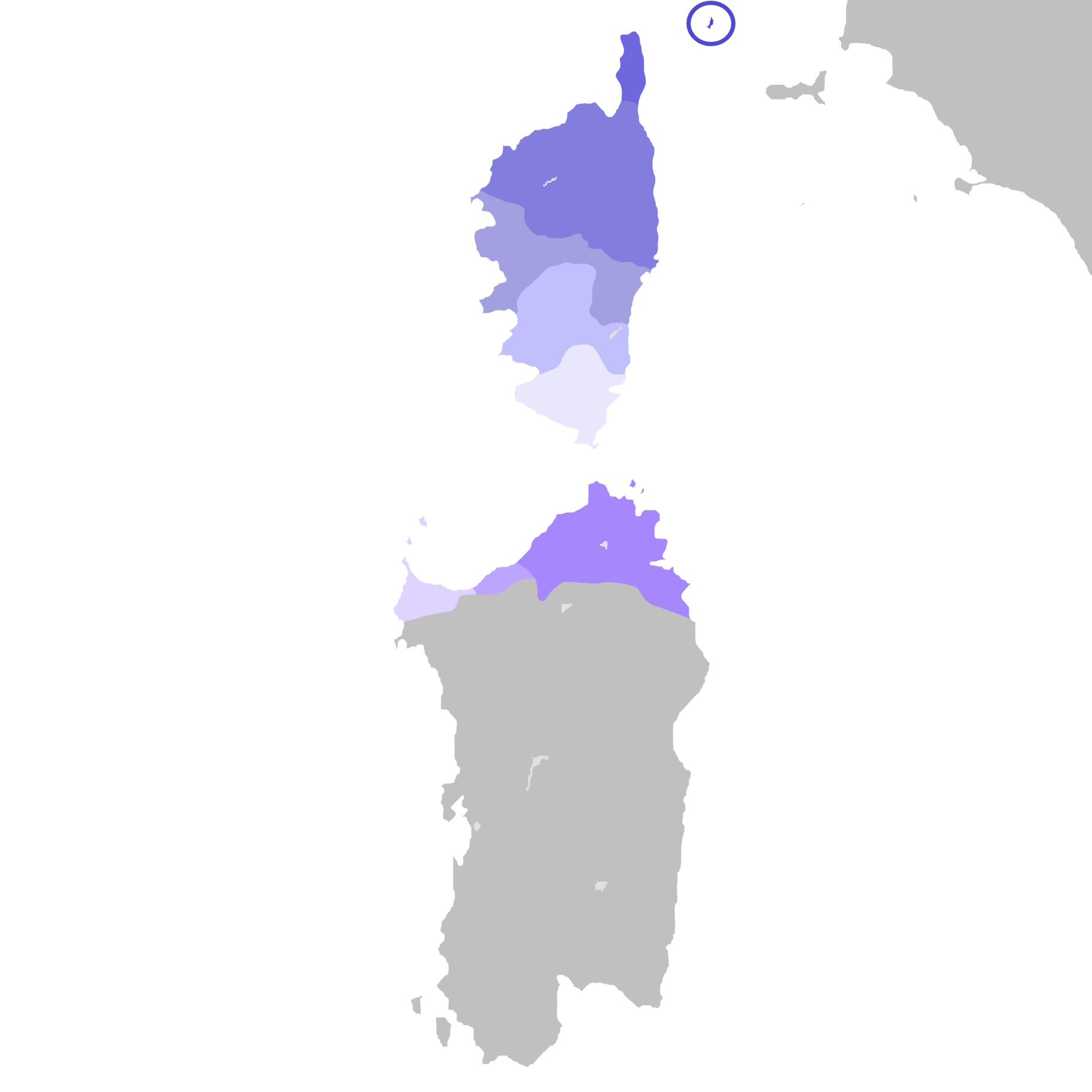
- Capraien (Capraiese)

An interesting aspect of the island's culture is the distinctive dialect spoken on Capraia until recent times: more closely related to Corsican than to mainland Tuscan, it was influenced by Ligurian for centuries, enriching itself with a number of lexical loanwords and morphological components of that origin. The Capraiese dialect died out during the 20th century following the renewal of the island's population: the local stock was gradually replaced by immigrants, mostly relatives of penal colony employees, who eventually became the majority without assimilating the linguistic habits of the old inhabitants.

=== Immigration ===
As of 2025, immigrants make up 12.0% of the total population. The 5 largest foreign countries of birth are Romania, Germany, Poland, Brazil, and Ethiopia.

== See also ==
- Capraia
- Tuscan Archipelago
- Punta Ferraione Lighthouse
