= Iginio Marianelli =

Italian politician (1925–2003)

President of the Province of Livorno
- In office 23 June 1990 – 27 April 1994
- Preceded by: Fabio Baldassarri
- Succeeded by: Claudio Frontera

Mayor of Rosignano Marittimo
- In office 1976–1980

Personal details
- Born: 12 August 1925 Rosignano Marittimo, Province of Livorno, Kingdom of Italy
- Died: 8 June 2003 (aged 77) Rosignano Marittimo, Tuscany, Italy
- Party: Italian Socialist Party
- Occupation: Worker

Iginio Marianelli (12 August 1925 – 8 June 2003) was an Italian politician of the Italian Socialist Party who served as president of the Province of Livorno from 1990 to 1994. He also served as a member of the Provincial Council from 1980 to 1994 and mayor of Rosignano Marittimo from 1976 to 1980.
