= Dino Raugi =

Italian politician and partisan (1926–2007)

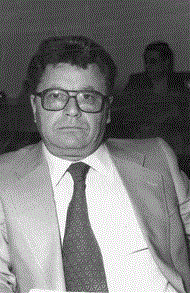
- Raugi in 1975

Mayor of Livorno
- In office 1966–1975
- Preceded by: Nicola Badaloni
- Succeeded by: Alì Nannipieri

Member of the Regional Council of Tuscany
- In office 1975–1985

Regional assessor for Public works and Transports of Tuscany
- In office 1975–1982
- President: Lelio Lagorio (1975–78); Mario Leone (1978–82)

Personal details
- Born: 12 March 1926 Livorno, Kingdom of Italy
- Died: 11 October 2007 (aged 81) Livorno, Italy
- Party: Italian Communist Party

Dino Raugi (12 March 1926 – 11 October 2007), commonly known as Bino Raugi, was an Italian politician and partisan. A member of the Italian Communist Party, he served as mayor of Livorno from 1966 to 1975 and as a member of the Regional Council of Tuscany from 1975 to 1985.

== Sources ==
- Bacci, Renzo. Dalla bottega al carcere fascista. Storia di tre ragazzi livornesi. Florence: Polistampa, 2013.
