= Niccola Costella =

Italian politician and merchant (1844–1907)

Mayor of Livorno
- In office September 1886 – October 1893
- Preceded by: Olinto Fernandez
- Succeeded by: Piero Donnini
- In office October 1897 – October 1898
- Preceded by: Rosolino Orlando
- Succeeded by: Francesco Ardisson

Member of the Chamber of Deputies
- In office 1895–1897
- Constituency: Livorno II

Personal details
- Born: 4 May 1844 Livorno, Grand Duchy of Tuscany
- Died: 13 October 1907 (aged 63) Livorno, Kingdom of Italy
- Occupation: Merchant

Niccola Costella (4 May 1844 – 13 October 1907) was an Italian politician and merchant who served twice as mayor of Livorno and was a member of the Chamber of Deputies of the Kingdom of Italy during the 19th legislature.

== Biography ==
List of mayors of Livorno from 1886 to 1893, he was the last mayor of Livorno to be appointed by royal decree and also the first mayor to be elected by the city council following the reform of 1889.In the May 1895 elections, he was elected to the 19th legislature of the Kingdom of Italy with 3,268 votes in the Livorno II electoral district.

He served as mayor of Livorno once again from October 1897 to October 1898, following the resignation of Rosolino Orlando.
