= Valdo Del Lucchese =

Italian politician (1923–2015)

President of the Province of Livorno
- In office 1970–1972
- Preceded by: Silvano Filippelli
- Succeeded by: Alì Nannipieri

Personal details
- Born: May 1923 Chianni, Province of Pisa, Kingdom of Italy
- Died: 10 January 2015 (aged 91) Livorno, Tuscany, Italy
- Party: PSI; PSIUP; PCI

Valdo Del Lucchese (May 1923 – 10 January 2015) was an Italian politician and trade unionist who served as president of the Province of Livorno from 1970 to 1972.

== Life and career ==
A war invalid, Del Lucchese became involved in politics through workers' struggles in Piombino and later moved to Livorno following the internal reorganization of the Italian Socialist Party led by Rodolfo Morandi. He was a CGIL secretary and provincial councillor before being elected president of the Province of Livorno in 1970 with the Italian Socialist Party of Proletarian Unity. In the first half of the 1980s, he served as a member of the Livorno City Council for the Italian Communist Party, in the administration headed by Alì Nannipieri.

Del Lucchese worked for the local health service and was director of the Livorno hospital library. In 2003 he founded an association for palliative care and was awarded the rank of Commander of the Order of Merit of the Italian Republic. From 2008 to 2015 he served as vice president of the National Association of War Invalids and Disabled Veterans (ANMIG).

He was hospitalized on 4 January 2015 with pneumonia and died six days later at the age of 91.

== Books ==
- Del Lucchese, Valdo (2012). Passato presente futuro. Compendio della storia dell'Associazione nazionale fra mutilati e invalidi di guerra 1917-2012. Rome: Associazione nazionale fra mutilati ed invalidi di guerra.
