= Stagnone della Capraia =

Lake in Tuscany, Italy

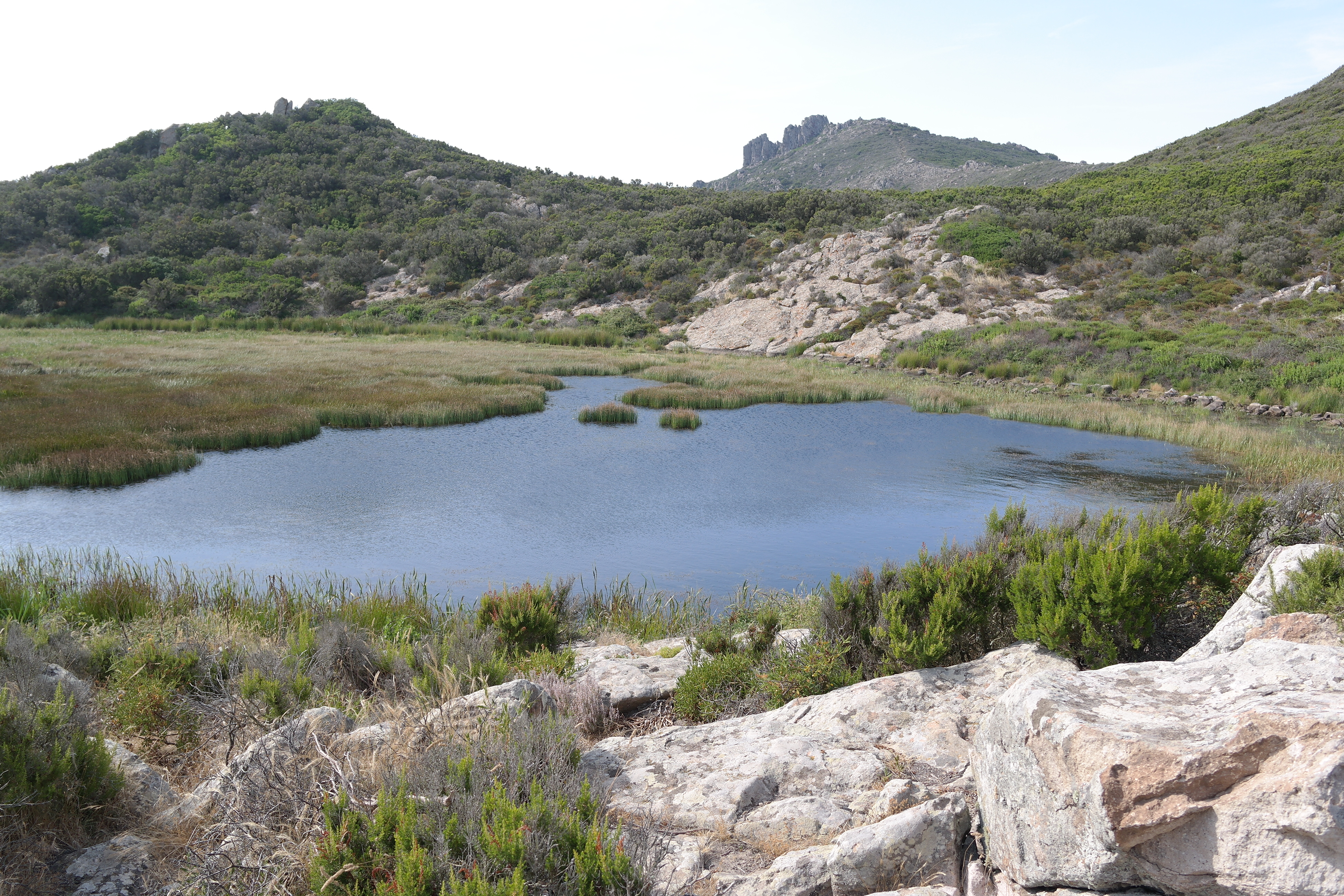

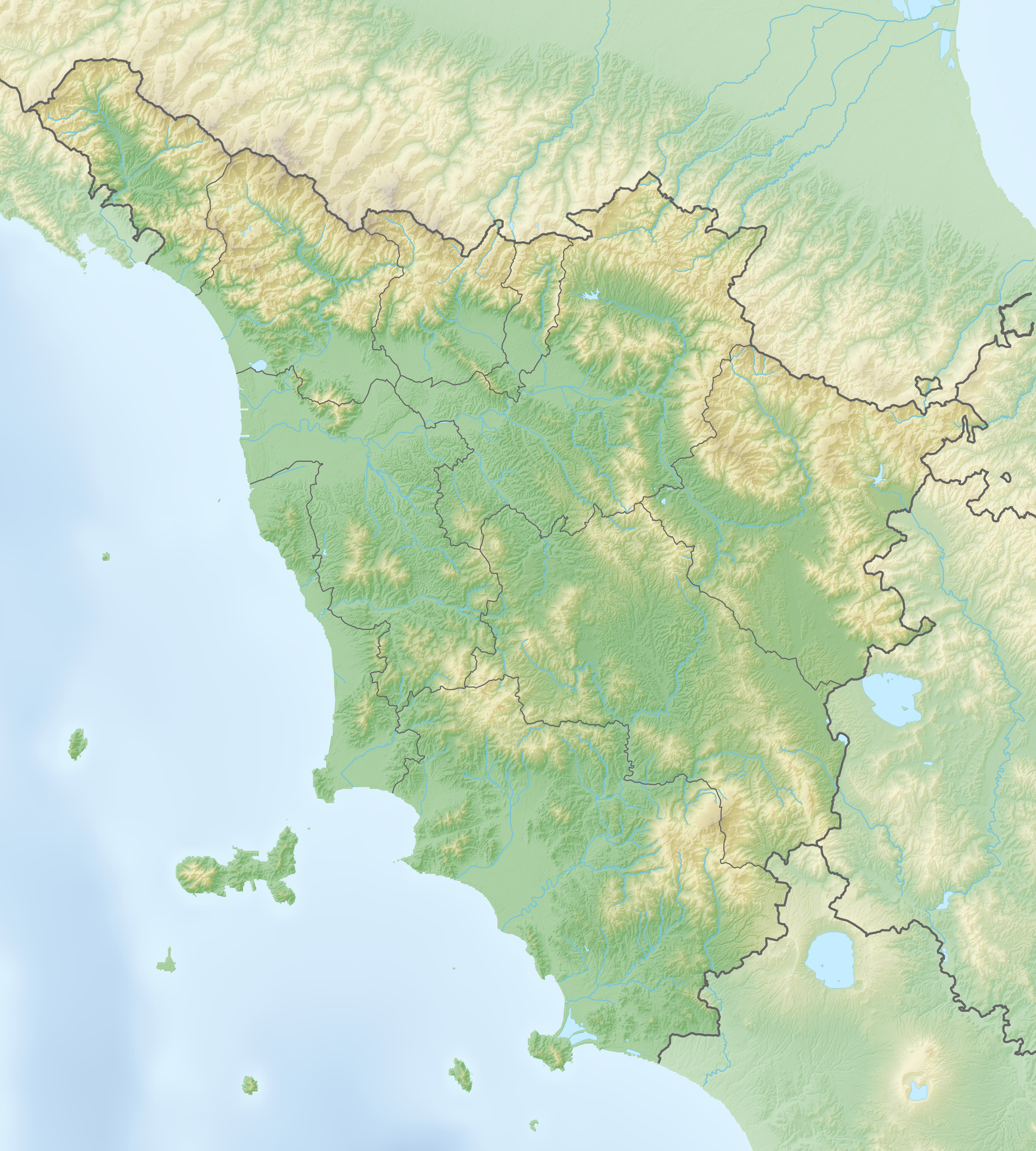
- Location within Tuscany
- Location: Province of Livorno, Tuscany
- Coordinates: 43°02′25.00″N 09°48′34.00″E
- Basin countries: Italy
- Surface area: 0.5 ha (1.2 acres)
- Surface elevation: 321 m (1,053 ft)

Stagnone della Capraia is a lake on the island Capraia in the Province of Livorno, Tuscany, Italy. At an elevation of 321 m, its surface area is 0.5 ha (1.2 acres). It forms the only permanent wetland in the Tuscan Archipelago.
