= Fernando Barbiero =

Italian physician and politician (1923–2006)

President of the Province of Livorno
- In office 1975–1980
- Preceded by: Alì Nannipieri
- Succeeded by: Emanuele Cocchella

Personal details
- Born: 15 October 1923 Pedivigliano, Province of Cosenza, Kingdom of Italy
- Died: 29 June 2006 (aged 82) Livorno, Tuscany, Italy
- Party: Italian Socialist Party
- Education: University of Modena
- Occupation: Physician

Fernando Barbiero (15 October 1923 – 29 June 2006) was an Italian politician and physician who served as president of the Province of Livorno from 1975 to 1980.

== Life and career ==
Born in Pedivigliano, in the province of Cosenza, Barbiero graduated in medicine from the University of Modena and specialized in pulmonology. He moved to Livorno in the early 1950s and worked at the Villa Corridi sanatorium. In 1968 he became head of pulmonology, a position he held until 1993.

A member of the Italian Socialist Party, Barbiero served for many years as a provincial councillor and was elected president of the Province of Livorno in 1975. He later served for several years as president of Toremar. He died at the Spedali Riuniti hospital in Livorno on 29 June 2006, aged 82.
