= Claudio Frontera =

Italian politician (born 1952)

President of the Province of Livorno
- In office 27 April 1994 – 14 June 2004
- Preceded by: Iginio Marianelli
- Succeeded by: Giorgio Kutufà

Personal details
- Born: 13 July 1952 (age 74) Volterra, Province of Pisa, Italy
- Party: Italian Communist Party; Democratic Party of the Left; Democrats of the Left; Democratic Party

Claudio Frontera (born 13 July 1952) is an Italian politician who served as president of the Province of Livorno from 1994 to 2004.

== Life and career ==
Born in Volterra, Frontera graduated in education with a specialisation in psychology from the University of Florence in 1978. A member of the Italian Communist Party (PCI), he served as Livorno's assessor for education and culture from 1980 to 1987 and was elected to the Provincial Council of Livorno in 1990.

Frontera became president of the Province of Livorno in April 1994, succeeding Iginio Marianelli. He was directly elected in 1995 with 56.5% of the vote as the candidate of a centre-left coalition and was re-elected in 1999 as the candidate of The Olive Tree. Following the dissolution of the PCI, he joined the Democratic Party of the Left and later the Democrats of the Left. From 1999 to 2005, he also served as president of the UPI Tuscany.

From 2007 to 2013, Frontera taught in the master's programme in public and political communication at the University of Pisa. He later served as president of the Tuscany System Foundation from 2008 to 2012.
