= Eugenio Sansoni =

Italian politician and lawyer (1828–1906)

Mayor of Livorno
- In office December 1865 – 18 February 1867
- Preceded by: Michele D'Angiolo (gonfalonier)
- Succeeded by: Federigo De Larderel

Member of the Chamber of Deputies
- In office 2 March 1869 – 2 November 1870

Personal details
- Born: 14 February 1828 Livorno, Grand Duchy of Tuscany
- Died: 26 February 1906 (aged 78) Livorno, Kingdom of Italy
- Profession: Lawyer

Eugenio Sansoni (14 February 1828 – 26 February 1906) was an Italian lawyer and politician. He was the first mayor of Livorno appointed by royal decree, serving from December 1865 to February 1867. In 1869, Sansoni was elected to the Chamber of Deputies of the Kingdom of Italy, representing the Livorno I constituency during the 10th legislature. He briefly served again as acting mayor in 1874 following the resignation of Federigo De Larderel.

== Biography ==
A lawyer by profession, Sansoni was the first mayor of Livorno to be appointed by Royal Decree in December 1865 and was elected to the 10th Legislature of the Kingdom of Italy in the second round of elections in February 1869. He served as mayor again in the summer of 1874 following the resignation of Federigo De Larderel.
