= Guido Torrigiani =

Italian mathematician, computer scientist and politician (1920–2000)

President of the Province of Livorno
- In office 1956–1964
- Preceded by: Giorgio Stoppa
- Succeeded by: Silvano Filippelli

Personal details
- Born: 13 January 1920 Porto Santo Stefano, Monte Argentario, Province of Grosseto, Kingdom of Italy
- Died: 7 June 2000 (aged 80) Pisa, Tuscany, Italy
- Party: Action Party (until 1947); Italian Socialist Party
- Education: Scuola Normale Superiore
- Occupation: Mathematician, computer scientist

Guido Torrigiani (13 January 1920 – 7 June 2000) was an Italian mathematician, computer scientist and politician. A member of the Italian Socialist Party, he served as president of the Province of Livorno from 1956 to 1964 and later played a significant role in the development of academic computing at the University of Pisa.

== Life and career ==
Born in Porto Santo Stefano, Torrigiani studied at the Scuola Normale Superiore in Pisa, graduating in mathematics in 1942. After initially joining the Action Party, he became a member of the Italian Socialist Party following the former's dissolution.

Torrigiani settled in Livorno and taught mathematical analysis at the Italian Naval Academy. In 1956 he was elected president of the Province of Livorno and was subsequently re-elected for a second term.

During the 1960s, he was invited by his friend Alessandro Faedo to help establish the Centro Nazionale Universitario di Calcolo Elettronico (CNUCE), one of Italy's pioneering computing research centres. Torrigiani later served as its director until 1979. He also taught mathematical analysis in the engineering faculty of the University of Pisa and conducted research at the Department of Applied Mathematics "Ulisse Dini".

From 1975 to 1990 he served as president of the Pietro Mascagni Institute of Musical Studies in Livorno, promoting musical and concert activities in the city.

He died in Pisa on 7 June 2000 following a cardiac arrest. Among the tributes paid after his death was a message from Italian president Carlo Azeglio Ciampi, a personal friend.

== Sources ==
- La vita democratica a Livorno. I risultati del voto in città dalla Liberazione ad oggi (PDF). Livorno: Comune di Livorno. 2003. Archived from the original (PDF) on 2019-04-24.
