= Emanuele Cocchella =

Italian politician (1922–2013)

President of the Province of Livorno
- In office 1980–1985
- Preceded by: Fernando Barbiero
- Succeeded by: Fabio Baldassarri

Personal details
- Born: 28 February 1922 Livorno, Kingdom of Italy
- Died: 5 January 2013 (aged 90) Livorno, Italy
- Party: PSI (until 1964); PSIdUP (1964–1972); PCI (1972–1991); PDS (1991–1998); DS (1998–2007); SEL (2009–2013)
- Education: University of Pisa
- Occupation: Teacher

Emanuele Cocchella (28 February 1922 – 5 January 2013) was an Italian politician and anti-fascist who served as president of the Province of Livorno from 1980 to 1985.

== Life and career ==
Known as "Manuel", Cocchella grew up in Fascist Italy and became involved in anti-fascism as a young man. During World War II he served as an officer cadet and later joined the Badoglio government forces, participating in the liberation of Italy.

He graduated in literature and philosophy from the University of Pisa in 1952. He worked as a teacher and secondary-school principal and served for many years as president of the Livorno provincial section of the National Association of Italian Partisans.

A member of the Italian Socialist Party, Cocchella entered the Livorno municipal administration in 1960. He joined the Italian Socialist Party of Proletarian Unity in 1964 and held several municipal portfolios, later serving as deputy mayor from 1970 to 1975.

Cocchella joined the Italian Communist Party and was elected to the Provincial Council of Livorno in 1975. He served as vice president and assessor for education before becoming president of the Province of Livorno from 1980 to 1985. He subsequently remained active in the political left, joining the Democratic Party of the Left, the Democrats of the Left and later Left Ecology Freedom.

Cocchella died on 5 January 2013 in Livorno, at the age of 90.
