= Alì Nannipieri =

Italian politician (1925–2007)

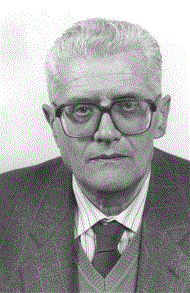

Mayor of Livorno
- In office 1975–1985
- Preceded by: Dino Raugi
- Succeeded by: Roberto Benvenuti

President of the Province of Livorno
- In office 1972–1975
- Preceded by: Valdo Del Lucchese
- Succeeded by: Fernando Barbiero

Member of the Regional Council of Tuscany
- In office May 1985 – March 1990

Regional assessor for General affairs, Personnel and Assets of Tuscany
- In office May 1985 – October 1988
- President: Gianfranco Bartolini

Personal details
- Born: 10 August 1925 Bagni di San Giuliano, Province of Pisa, Kingdom of Italy
- Died: 24 November 2007 Livorno, Italy
- Party: Italian Communist Party

Alì Nannipieri (10 August 1925 – 24 November 2007) was an Italian politician of the Italian Communist Party. He served as president of the Province of Livorno from 1972 to 1975 and as mayor of Livorno from 1975 to 1985. He later became a member of the Regional Council of Tuscany, where he served as regional assessor from 1985 to 1988.
