= Maria Ida Bessi =

Italian politician (born 1961)

President of the Province of Livorno
- In office 1 November 2018 – 26 November 2022
- Preceded by: Alessandro Franchi
- Succeeded by: Sandra Scarpellini

Mayor of Capraia Isola
- Incumbent
- Assumed office 27 May 2026
- Preceded by: Lorenzo Renzi
- In office 10 June 2018 – 15 May 2023
- Preceded by: Gaetano Guarente
- Succeeded by: Lorenzo Renzi

Personal details
- Born: 13 April 1961 (age 65) Capraia Isola, Province of Livorno, Italy

Maria Ida Bessi (born 13 April 1961) is an Italian politician who served as president of the Province of Livorno from 2018 to 2022, becoming the first woman to hold the office.

== Life and career ==
Bessi was born in Capraia Isola, province of Livorno, in 1961. She began her political career in the late 1980s, when she was elected to the municipal council of Capraia Isola as a civic-list candidate. She was re-elected in 2001, 2006 and 2016, and also served as a municipal assessor with executive responsibilities.

In June 2018, Bessi was elected mayor of Capraia Isola, leading the civic list Insieme per Capraia, with 71.86% of the vote, defeating Arturo Vasuino, who received 28.13%.

In October 2018, Bessi was elected president of the Province of Livorno supported by the centre-left coalition, receiving 78% of the weighted vote against 22% for Maurizio Papi, the mayor of Porto Azzurro. She became the first woman to serve as president of the province.

In May 2023, Bessi narrowly lost re-election as mayor of Capraia Isola, receiving 49.49% of the vote against Lorenzo Renzi's 49.83%. She was re-elected mayor in 2026 with 63.61% of the vote.
