= Giorgio Kutufà =

Italian politician (1948–2020)

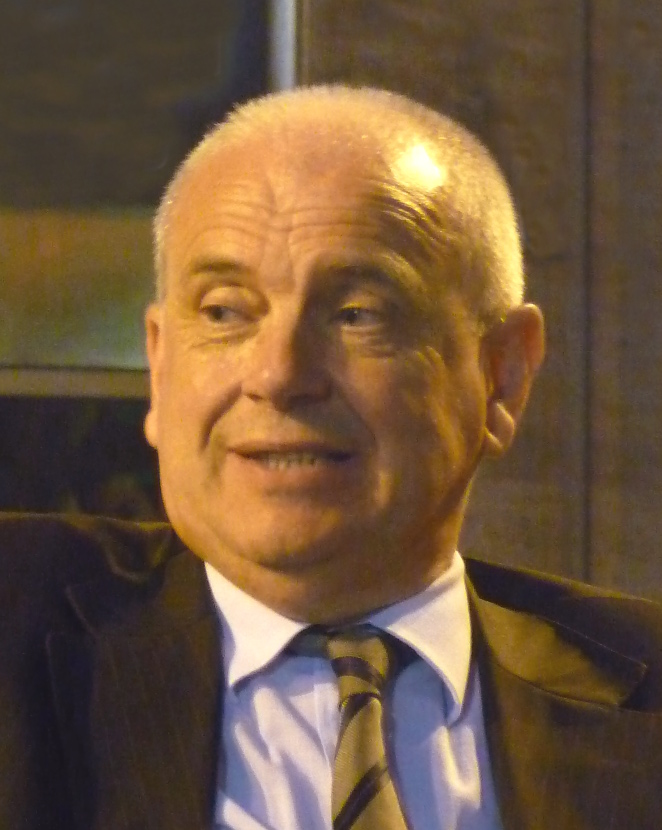
- Kutufà in 2009

President of the Province of Livorno
- In office 13 June 2004 – 14 October 2014
- Preceded by: Claudio Frontera
- Succeeded by: Alessandro Franchi

Member of the Regional Council of Tuscany
- In office 13 August 1985 – 13 June 1995

Member of the Livorno municipal council
- In office 1970–1985

Personal details
- Born: 10 April 1948 Livorno, Italy
- Died: 13 May 2020 (aged 72) Livorno, Italy
- Party: Democratic Party
- Other political affiliations: Christian Democracy
- Spouse: Daniela
- Education: University of Pisa

Giorgio Kutufà (10 April 1948 – 13 May 2020) was an Italian politician who served as the President of the Province of Livorno from 13 June 2004 to 14 October 2014. He also served in the Regional Council of Tuscany from 1985 to 1995.

== Biography ==
Giorgio Kutufà was born and raised in Livorno. He studied economics and commerce at the University of Pisa. Kutufà returned to the university as a member of the Faculty of Economics later in his life.

Kutufà was first elected to the Livorno municipal council in 1970, where he served from 1970 to 1985 as a member of the Christian Democrats (DC). He was then elected to the Regional Council of Tuscany from 1985 to 1995. Following the dissolution of the Christian Democratic (DC) party in 1994, Kutufà became a co-founder of Toscana Democratica.

Kutufà served as President of the Province of Livorno for two terms from 13 June 2004 to 14 October 2014. He became provincial President in 2004 when his center left coalition comprising Democrats of the Left, The Daisy, Party of Italian Communists, Federation of the Greens, and the Italian Democratic Socialists, captured 59.3% of the vote in the June 2004 election.

In 2009, Giorgio Kutufà won a second term as President of the Province of Livorno when his new center-left coalition, this time supported by the Democratic Party, Italy of Values and Left Ecology Freedom parties, won 54.4% of the vote in the 6–7 June election.

Giorgio Kutufà died from a long illness on 13 May 2020 at the age of 72. He was survived by his wife, Daniela, and two children, Ilaria and Luigi.
