= List of presidents of the Province of Livorno =

President of the Province of Livorno
- Presidente della Provincia di Livorno
- Incumbent; Sandra Scarpellini since 26 November 2022
- Residence: Palazzo Granducale
- Term length: 4 years
- Inaugural holder: Dino Malenchini
- Formation: 1889
- Deputy: Eleonora Agostinelli

The president of the Province of Livorno is the head of the provincial government in Livorno, Tuscany, Italy. The president oversees the administration of the province, coordinates the activities of the municipalities, and represents the province in regional and national matters. The provincial government is headquartered in the Palazzo Granducale in Livorno, where the council chamber is located.

Since November 2022, the office has been held by Sandra Scarpellini of the Democratic Party.

== History ==
The Provincial Deputation was established in 1861 following the unification of Italy, serving as the executive branch of the province alongside the Provincial Council, which acts as the legislative body. Until 1889, the role of president of the deputation was held by the prefect. The first president elected in 1889 was Dino Malenchini, who served until 1902.

During the Fascist regime (1928–1944), the Provincial Rectorate replaced the deputation, and presidents were appointed by the central government. After World War II, the Provincial Deputation was briefly reinstated (1944–1951) before the modern office of the President of the Province was established in 1951, elected by the Provincial Council.

From 1995 to 2014, the president was elected directly by the citizens of the province. Following the 2014 Delrio reform, presidents are elected by the Assembly of the mayors and municipal councillors of the province's municipalities, and the term of office was reduced from five to four years.

== List ==
=== Presidents of the Provincial Deputation (1889–1929) ===
No.	Portrait	Name	Term of office		Party
No.	Portrait	Name	Start	End	Party
1		Dino Malenchini	1889	1902	
2		Amilcare Galeotti (18??–1932)	1902	1914	
3		Angelo Bonichi (18??–1932)	1914	1921	
—		Saverio Bonomo	1922	19 July 1923	Prefectural commissioner
(3)		Angelo Bonichi (18??–1932)	19 July 1923	April 1929	National Fascist Party

=== Presidents of the Provincial Rectorate (1929–1944) ===
No.	Portrait	Name	Term of office		Party
No.	Portrait	Name	Start	End	Party
1		Angelo Bonichi (18??–1932)	April 1929	22 March 1932	National Fascist Party
2		Arrigo Galeotti	7 April 1932	?	National Fascist Party
		?	?	?	National Fascist Party

=== Presidents of the Provincial Deputation (1944–1951) ===
No.	Portrait	Name	Term of office		Party
No.	Portrait	Name	Start	End	Party
		Giuseppe Funaro	?	?	Italian Socialist Party

=== Presidents of the Province (1951–present) ===
No.	Portrait	Name	Term of office		Party	Election
No.	Portrait	Name	Start	End	Party	Election
1		Giorgio Stoppa (1912–1985)	1951	1956	Italian Communist Party	1951
2		Guido Torrigiani (1920–2000)	1956	1960	Italian Socialist Party	1956
2		Guido Torrigiani (1920–2000)	1960	1964	Italian Socialist Party	1960
3		Silvano Filippelli (1919–1977)	1964	1970	Italian Communist Party	1964
4		Valdo Del Lucchese (1923–2015)	1970	1972	Italian Socialist Party of Proletarian Unity	1970
5		Alì Nannipieri (1925–2007)	1972	1975	Italian Communist Party	1970
6		Fernando Barbiero (1923–2006)	1975	1980	Italian Socialist Party	1975
7		Emanuele Cocchella (1922–2013)	1980	1985	Italian Communist Party	1980
8		Fabio Baldassarri (b. 1946)	26 June 1985	23 June 1990	Italian Communist Party	1985
9		Iginio Marianelli (1925–2003)	23 June 1990	20 April 1994	Italian Socialist Party	1990
10		Claudio Frontera (b. 1952)	27 April 1994	24 April 1995	Democratic Party of the Left	1990
10		Claudio Frontera (b. 1952)	24 April 1995	14 June 1999	Democratic Party of the Left	1995
10		Claudio Frontera (b. 1952)	14 June 1999	14 June 2004	Democrats of the Left	1999
11		Giorgio Kutufà (1948–2020)	14 June 2004	8 June 2009	The Daisy / Democratic Party	2004
11		Giorgio Kutufà (1948–2020)	8 June 2009	14 October 2014	Democratic Party	2009
12		Alessandro Franchi (b. 1975)	14 October 2014	1 November 2018	Democratic Party	2014
13		Maria Ida Bessi (b. 1961)	1 November 2018	26 November 2022	Centre-left independent	2018
14		Sandra Scarpellini (b. 1968)	26 November 2022	Incumbent	Democratic Party	2022

== Sources ==
- La vita democratica a Livorno. I risultati del voto in città dalla Liberazione ad oggi. Livorno: Comune di Livorno. 2003.
- Ceccotti, Paola (2006). Il fascismo a Livorno. Empoli: Ibiskos.
- Cifelli, Alberto (2008). L'istituto prefettizio dalla caduta del fascismo all'Assemblea costituente. I Prefetti della Liberazione (PDF). Rome: Scuola Superiore dell'Amministrazione dell'Interno. Archived from the original (PDF) on 2019-09-03.
- Menichini, Piera (2005). "I presidenti delle Province dall'Unità alla Grande guerra: repertorio analitico". Storia Amministrazione Costituzione (13): 258–259.
