= Capraia =

Italian island

Native name: Isola di Capraia (Italian) Isula di Capraghja (Corsican)
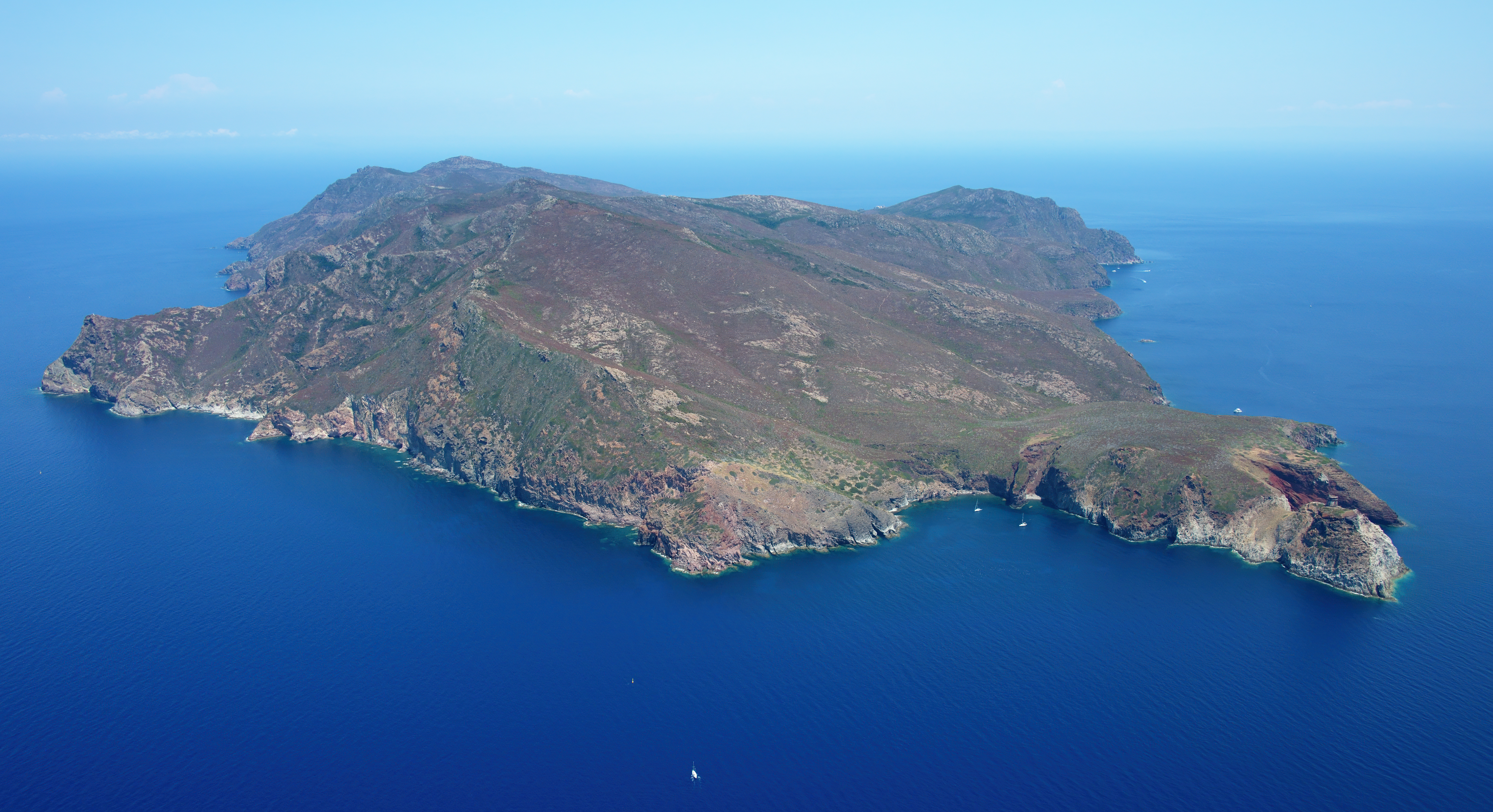

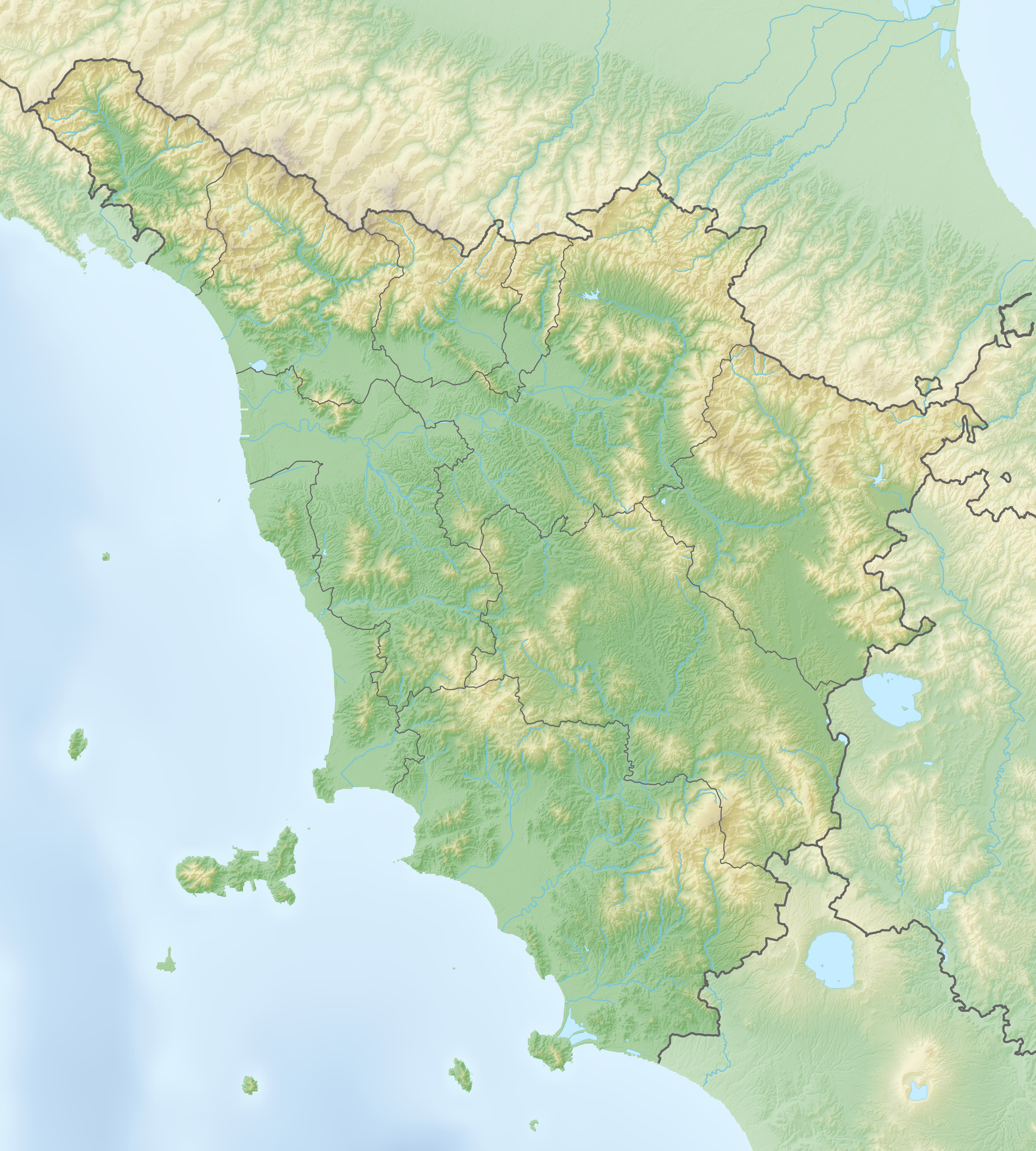
- Location within Italy Location within Tuscany

Geography
- Location: Tyrrhenian Sea
- Coordinates: 43°02′14″N 9°49′06″E
- Archipelago: Tuscan Archipelago
- Area: 19.33 km^{2} (7.46 sq mi)
- Highest elevation: 466 m (1529 ft)

Administration
- Italy
- Region: Tuscany
- Province: Livorno
- Comune: Capraia Isola

Demographics
- Population: 407 (December 2018)

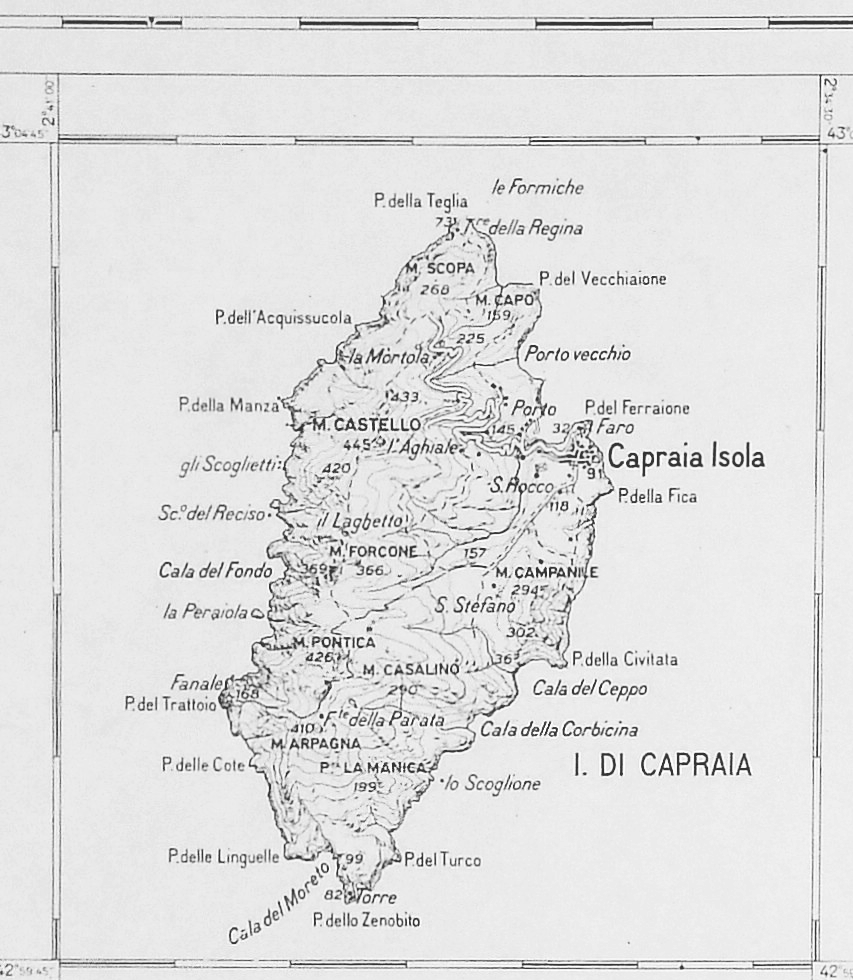
Map of the island

Capraia is an Italian island, the northwesternmost of the seven islands of the Tuscan Archipelago, and the third largest after Elba and Giglio.

It is also a comune (Capraia Isola) belonging to the Province of Livorno. The island has a population of about 400.

== Geography ==
Capraia is 62 kilometres (39 mi) from the city of Livorno by sea, and 32 kilometres (20 mi) northwest of the island of Elba; it is slightly closer, at 30 kilometres (19 mi), to the French island of Corsica. The island is accessible by ferries that depart from the port of Livorno.

Capraia is of volcanic origin, has an area of 19 square kilometres (7.3 mi^{2}) and its highest point is 466 metres (1,529 ft) above sea level. It is about 8 kilometres (5 mi) long (from Punta della Teglia to Punta dello Zenobio) and about 4 kilometres (2 mi) wide. It has a coastline that is about 30 kilometres (19 mi) in circumference. The island is part of the Arcipelago Toscano National Park and marine sanctuary. There is a tiny lake on the island, called Stagnone della Capraia.

The island's small harbour, Porto di Capraia, is connected to the village by the one and only asphalted road on the island. The village, dominated by the Fortress of St George, preserves its original characteristics unaltered. Sites of tourist interest include the Church of the Assunta, the Church of St Nicola and the Sacred Heart of Jesus, the Church and Convent of St Antonio, and the Church of St Stefano alla Piana. The Fortress is not open to visitors.

The island produces wine, and is a centre of the anchovy fishery. About 40 kilometres (25 mi) to the north is the island of Gorgona, which is also famous for its anchovies. In the summer the island is also a popular stopping point for yachts sailing between Livorno, Elba, and Corsica.

== History ==
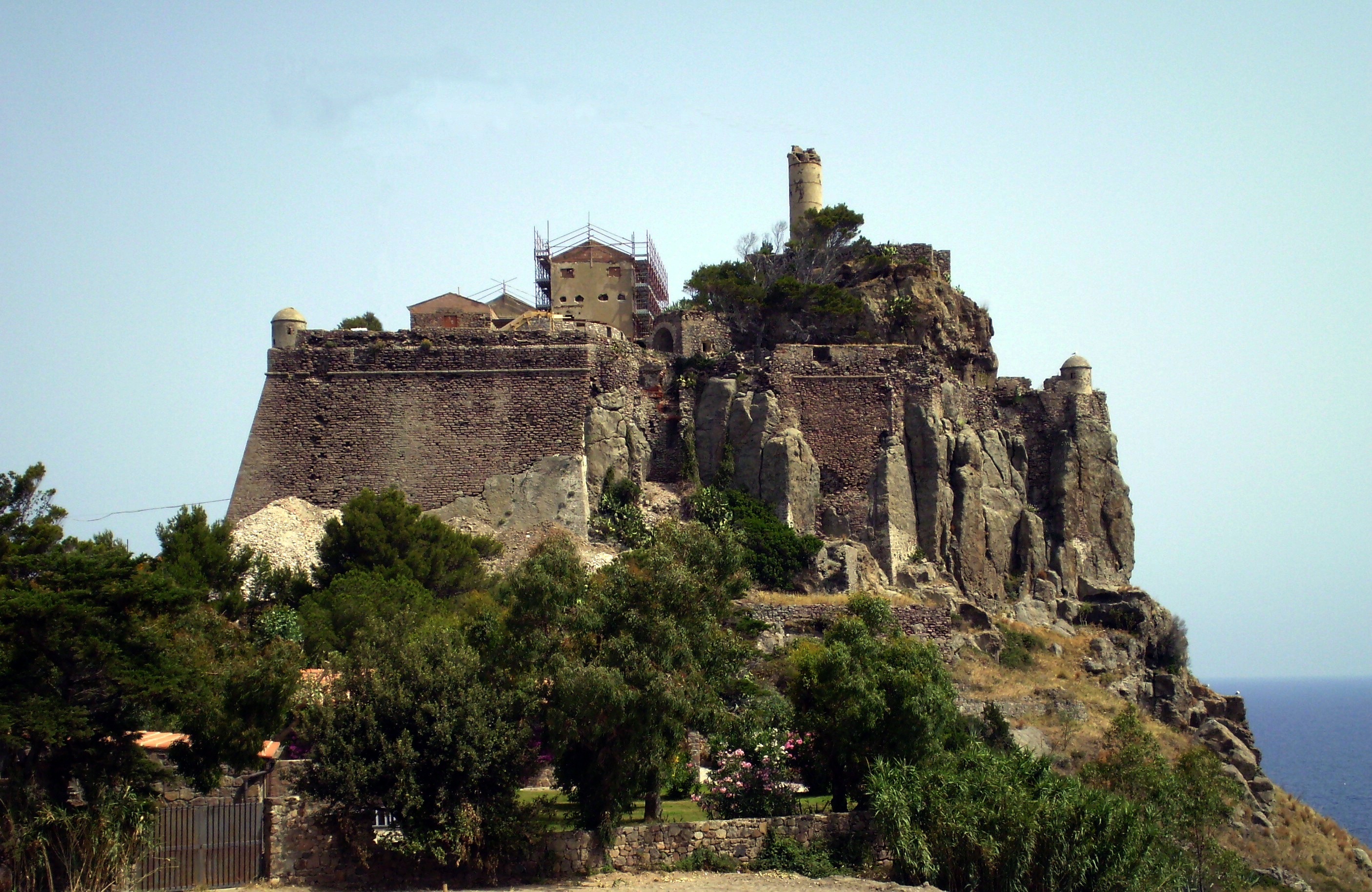
Fortress of St. George

The Greeks called the island Aegylon or Aegyllion (Αίγυλλον Greek for Rocky Island, often mistaken with "Goat place", see also Giglio). Its current name may have originated in the Etruscan carpa (stone), a word that comes from the archaic Greek Kalpe (sepulchral stone). The Romans called the island Capraria, name morphing often mistaken to reflect the presence of wild goats (Latin: caprī, or Greek: capros κάπρος, wild boar), while it actually was meant to indicate a rocky island, "a place for goats".

In the 4th century AD it housed a cenobium, where the church of St. Stephen now stands. The early 5th century poet Rutilius recorded that the island was "a mess" and that there were many monastic communities by his time.

In 1055 it was raided by Saracen pirates, and later the Republic of Pisa owned it. It became part of the Republic of Genoa after the Battle of Meloria, being assigned to the patrician Jacopo de Mari (1430). In 1540 the Genoese built the Forte San Giorgio on a pre-existing fortification that the Ottoman corsair Turgut Reis had demolished. The Genoese also built three coastal watch towers (part of a system of Genoese towers) to protect against pirates. The three are:

- Torre del Porto (1541), which protected the entrance to the harbour, and which replaced or added to an earlier tower dating to 1510;
- Torre dello Zenobito (1545); and
- Torre delle Barbici (1699), also known as Torre della Teja or Torre della Regina. It is the only tower with a square shape, which makes it somewhat similar to the De Redin towers on Malta. Torre delle Barbici is in a fairly dilapidated state. Since 2009 a path connects it to the port.

In 1767 troops under Pasquale Paoli of the new independent Corsican Republic occupied Capraia. It was captured during the French conquest of Corsica, but returned to Genoa and detached from Corsica under the terms of the Treaty of Versailles (1768).

In 1796 the British, under Admiral Lord Horatio Nelson, occupied the island for a short time, following the creation of the short-lived Anglo-Corsican Kingdom. After the Congress of Vienna in 1815 annexed the Republic of Genoa to the Kingdom of Sardinia, Capraia became part of the province of Genoa. Then in 1925, it was assigned to Livorno.

Between 1873 and 1986 a penal colony occupied almost two-thirds of Capraia. In 1986 the government closed the penal colony and opened the island to visitors.

== See also ==
- List of islands of Italy
- Tuscan Archipelago
- Punta Ferraione Lighthouse
