= Sandra Scarpellini =

Italian politician (born 1968)

President of the Province of Livorno
- Incumbent
- Assumed office 26 November 2022
- Preceded by: Maria Ida Bessi

Mayor of Castagneto Carducci
- Incumbent
- Assumed office 26 May 2014
- Preceded by: Fabio Tinti

Personal details
- Born: 14 December 1968 (age 57) Rosignano Marittimo, Province of Livorno, Italy
- Party: Democratic Party

Sandra Scarpellini (born 14 December 1968) is an Italian politician of the Democratic Party who has served as president of the Province of Livorno since 2022.

Scarpellini was elected to the municipal council of Castagneto Carducci in June 2009. She was elected mayor in 2014 and re-elected in 2019 and 2024. In November 2022, she was chosen by the Democratic Party as its candidate for president of the Province of Livorno. Scarpellini was elected with 69.3% of the weighted votes, defeating Davide Montauti, who received 30.7%.
