= Roberto Benvenuti =

Italian politician (1945–2010)

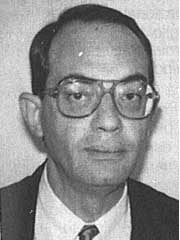

Member of the Senate of the Republic
- In office 23 April 1992 – 8 May 1996

Mayor of Livorno
- In office 22 June 1985 – 31 December 1991
- Preceded by: Alì Nannipieri
- Succeeded by: Gianfranco Lamberti

Personal details
- Born: 8 October 1945 Livorno, Kingdom of Italy
- Died: 11 December 2010 (aged 65) Las Vegas, Nevada, United States
- Party: Italian Communist Party (until 1991); Democratic Party of the Left (1991–1998)
- Occupation: Journalist

Roberto Benvenuti (8 October 1945 – 11 December 2010) was an Italian politician. A member of the Italian Communist Party and later the Democratic Party of the Left, he served as mayor of Livorno from 1985 to 1991 and as a member of the Italian Senate from 1992 to 1996.
