= Silvano Filippelli =

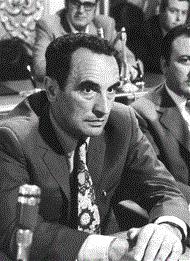

Regional assessor for Education and Culture of Tuscany
- In office 1970–1975
- President: Lelio Lagorio

Member of the Regional Council of Tuscany
- In office 1970–1975

President of the Province of Livorno
- In office 1965–1970
- Preceded by: Guido Torrigiani
- Succeeded by: Valdo Del Lucchese

Personal details
- Born: 4 February 1919 Livorno, Kingdom of Italy
- Died: 13 December 1977 (aged 58) Livorno, Italy
- Party: Italian Communist Party
- Occupation: Teacher, art critic, documentary filmmaker

Silvano Filippelli (4 February 1919 – 13 December 1977) was an Italian politician, teacher, art critic, and documentary filmmaker. A member of the Italian Communist Party, he served as president of the Province of Livorno from 1965 to 1970 and as regional assessor for Education and Culture in the first legislature of Tuscany (1970–1975).

== Life and career ==
Born in Livorno in 1919, the son of painter Cafiero Filippelli and Ottorina Annarella, Filippelli became involved in anti-fascist circles while still a young man. After studying at the Accademia di Belle Arti di Firenze and attending architecture courses, he worked as a teacher of drawing and art history in Piombino and Livorno. Following the fall of Fascism, he joined the Italian Communist Party (PCI) and became an important figure in Livorno's cultural scene, co-founding the city's film society, organizing cultural events, directing experimental theatre productions, and producing documentary films focused on Livorno.

Filippelli entered local politics in the 1950s. He served as Livorno's municipal assessor for public works and urban planning from 1955 to 1960, then as vice-president and public works assessor of the Province of Livorno from 1960 to 1965. He was president of the Province of Livorno between 1965 and 1970, while also overseeing planning and tourism policies.

Elected to the first Regional Council of Tuscany in 1970, Filippelli served as regional assessor for Education and Culture until 1975, promoting cultural and educational initiatives during the formative years of the regional government. He remained active in public and cultural affairs until his death from an aneurysm in 1977 while serving as president of Tuscany's regional committee for RAI decentralization.

== Sources ==
- "Silvano Filippelli" (in Italian). Regione Toscana.
- "Silvano Filippelli" (in Italian). Consiglio regionale della Toscana.
- "Filippelli, Silvano". Sistema Informativo Unificato per le Soprintendenze Archivistiche (in Italian). Ministero della cultura.
- Donzelli, F. (1987). Pittori livornesi: secondo Novecento (in Italian). Bologna: Cappelli.
