= Federigo De Larderel =

Italian politician and industrialist (1815–1876)

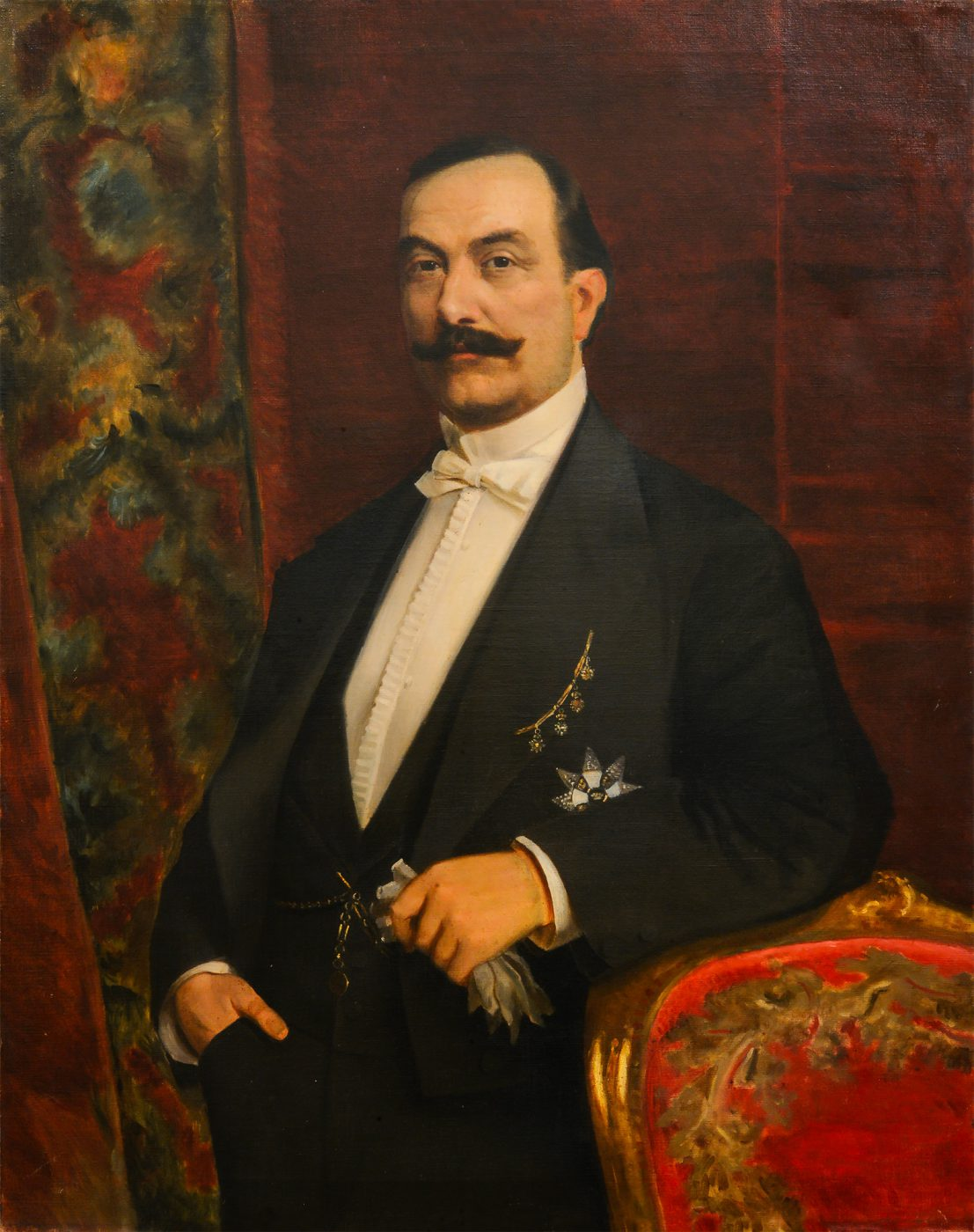

Mayor of Livorno
- In office 11 April 1870 – April 1874
- Preceded by: Eugenio Sansoni
- Succeeded by: Andrea Giovannetti

Senator of the Kingdom of Italy
- In office 22 December 1870 – 29 January 1876

Personal details
- Born: 21 April 1815 Livorno, French Empire
- Died: 29 January 1876 (aged 60) Florence, Kingdom of Italy
- Occupation: Industrialist

Federigo De Larderel (21 April 1815 – 29 January 1876) was an Italian industrialist and politician who served as mayor of Livorno from 1870 to 1874 and as a senator of the Kingdom of Italy from 1870 until his death.
