= Punta Ferraione Lighthouse =

Punta del Ferraione
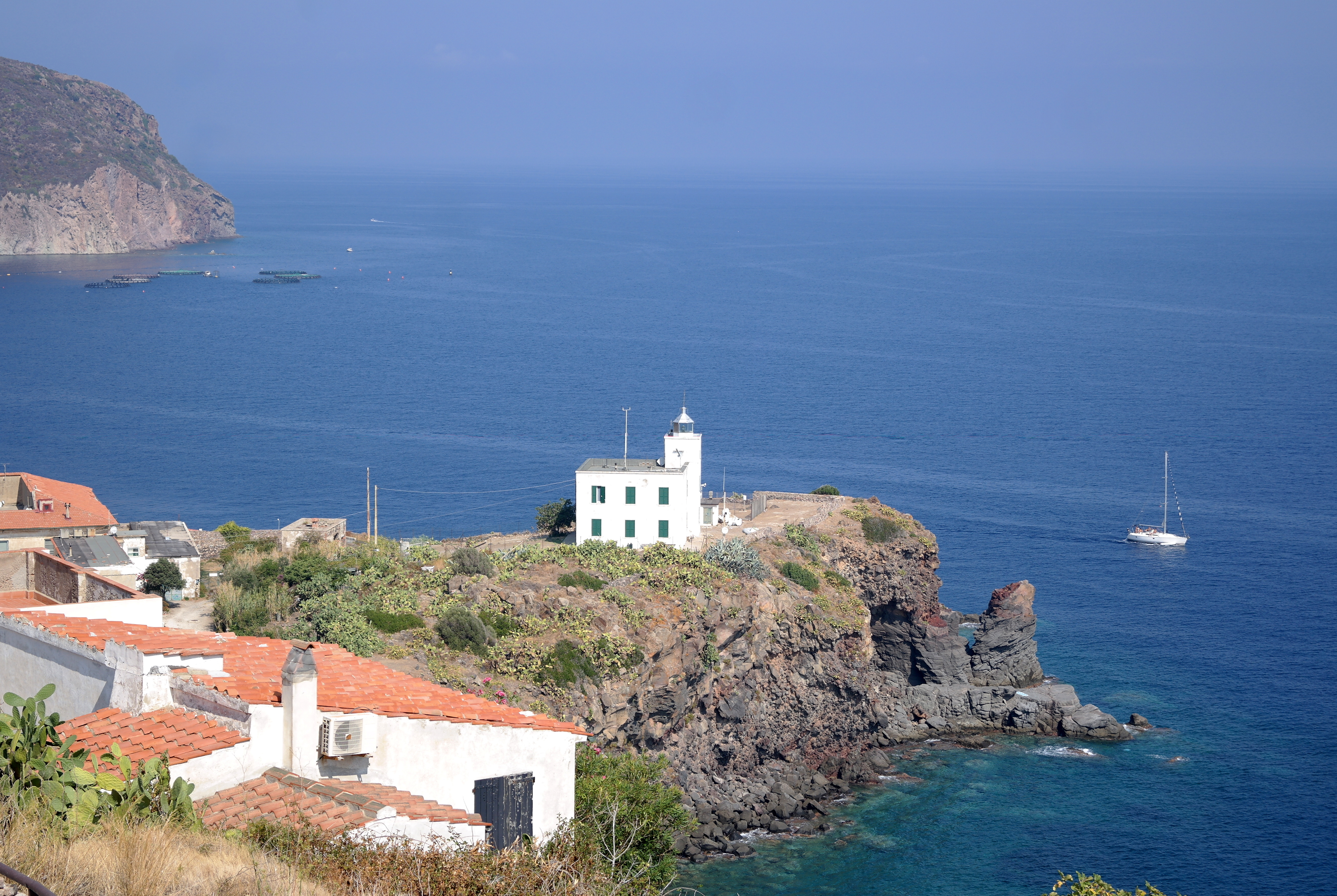
- Punta Ferraione Lighthouse
- Location: Capraia; Tuscany; Italy
- Coordinates: 43°03′04.2″N 9°50′39.27″E

Tower
- Constructed: 1868 (first)
- Foundation: concrete base
- Construction: masonry tower
- Height: 12 metres (39 ft)
- Shape: quadrangular tower with lantern and gallery attached to a 2-storey keeper's house
- Markings: white tower and keeper's house, grey metallic lantern
- Operator: Marina Militare

Light
- First lit: 1908 (current)
- Focal height: 30 metres (98 ft)
- Lens: Type TD
- Light source: main power
- Range: main: 16 nautical miles (30 km; 18 mi) reserve: 10 nautical miles (19 km; 12 mi)
- Characteristic: L Fl W 6s.
- Italy no.: 1996 E.F

Punta Ferraione Lighthouse (Italian: Faro di Punta del Ferraione) is an active lighthouse located on the eastern tip of a small bay which delimits the harbour of the island of Capraia in the Tuscan Archipelago on the Tyrrhenian Sea.

== Description ==
The lighthouse, built in 1868 and refurbished in 1908, consists of a quadrangular tower, 12 metres (39 ft) high, attached to the northern corner of the 2-storey keeper's house; both are painted white. The lantern and the lantern roof have an octagonal shape and are painted grey metallic. Though the lighthouse is automated and there is no keeper in service, the building accommodate the local office of the Guardia Costiera.

The light is positioned at 30 metres (98 ft) above sea level and emits a long white flash in a 6 seconds period, visible up to a distance of 16 nautical miles (30 km; 18 mi). The lighthouse is completely automated and managed by the Marina Militare with the identification code number 1996 E.F.

== See also ==
- List of lighthouses in Italy
- Capraia
