= Gianfranco Lamberti =

Italian politician

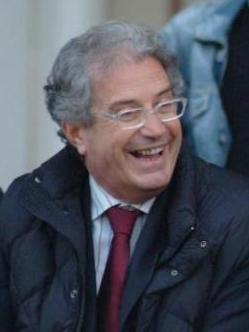

Mayor of Livorno
- In office 5 February 1992 – 14 June 2004
- Preceded by: Roberto Benvenuti
- Succeeded by: Alessandro Cosimi

Mayor of Montecorvino Pugliano
- In office 6 June 2016 – 1 March 2018
- Preceded by: Domenico Di Giorgio
- Succeeded by: Alessandro Chiola

Personal details
- Born: 25 January 1947 Salerno, Italy
- Died: 1 March 2018 (aged 71) Livorno, Italy
- Party: Italian Communist Party (until 1991); Democratic Party of the Left (1991–1998); Democrats of the Left (1998–2007)

Gianfranco Lamberti (25 January 1947 – 1 March 2018) was an Italian politician who served as mayor of Livorno from 1992 to 2004 and as mayor of Montecorvino Pugliano from 2016 until his death.

== Life and career ==
A surgeon by profession, Lamberti graduated in Medicine and Surgery from the University of Naples Federico II. He worked in the healthcare sector in Tuscany before entering politics through trade union activity.

A member of the Italian Communist Party, he later joined its successor parties, namely the Democratic Party of the Left and the Democrats of the Left. He was elected mayor of Livorno in 1992 and was re-elected twice, serving until 2004.

After leaving local government, he remained active in politics and civic initiatives. In 2016 he was elected mayor of Montecorvino Pugliano, in Campania, a position he held until his death on 1 March 2018.
