= Filippo Nogarin =

Italian politician

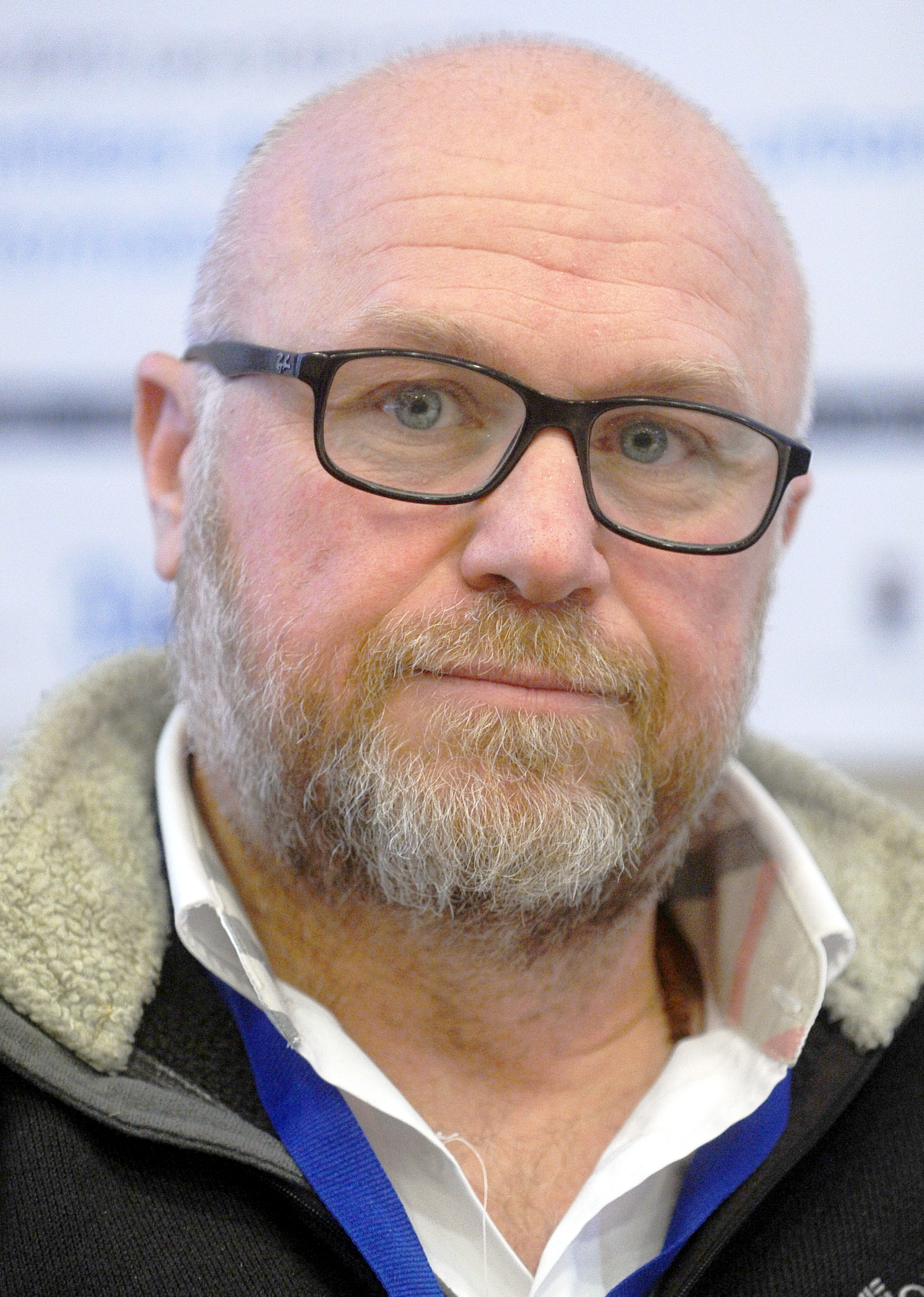

Mayor of Livorno
- In office 9 June 2014 – 11 June 2019
- Preceded by: Alessandro Cosimi
- Succeeded by: Luca Salvetti

Personal details
- Born: 4 September 1970 (age 56) Livorno, Tuscany, Italy
- Party: Five Star Movement
- Education: University of Pisa
- Profession: Engineer

Filippo Nogarin (born 4 September 1970) is an Italian politician.

He is a member of the Five Star Movement and he served as Mayor of Livorno from 9 June 2014 to 11 June 2019.

Nogarin was a candidate for the European Parliament at the 2019 European Parliament election in Italy, but was not elected.

== See also ==
- 2014 Italian local elections
- List of mayors of Livorno

Political offices
Preceded by Alessandro Cosimi	Mayor of Livorno; 2014–2019	Succeeded by Luca Salvetti
