= Alessandro Cosimi =

Italian politician

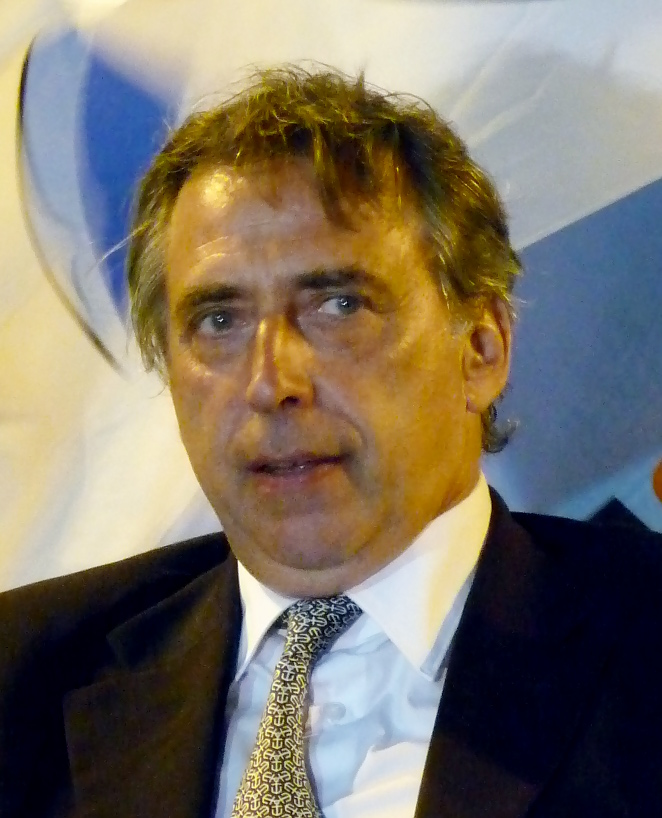

Mayor of Livorno
- In office 14 June 2004 – 9 June 2014
- Preceded by: Gianfranco Lamberti
- Succeeded by: Filippo Nogarin

Personal details
- Born: 10 November 1955 (age 70) Livorno, Italy
- Party: PDS (1995-1999); DS (1999-2007); PD (2007-2020); Italia Viva (since 2020)
- Education: University of Pisa
- Profession: Physician

Alessandro Cosimi (born 10 November 1955) is an Italian politician.

After two terms as municipal councillor (1995-1999; 1999-2004), he ran for mayor of Livorno at the 2004 local elections, supported by a centre-left coalition. He was elected on 13 June and took office on 14 June 2004. Cosimi was confirmed for a second term at the 2009 elections.

== See also ==
- 2004 Italian local elections
- 2009 Italian local elections
- List of mayors of Livorno

Political offices
Preceded by Gianfranco Lamberti	Mayor of Livorno; 2004–2014	Succeeded by Filippo Nogarin
