= Alessandro Franchi (politician) =

Italian politician

Member of the Regional Council of Tuscany
- Incumbent
- Assumed office 29 October 2025

President of the Province of Livorno
- In office 13 October 2014 – 31 October 2018
- Preceded by: Giorgio Kutufà
- Succeeded by: Maria Ida Bessi

Mayor of Rosignano Marittimo
- In office 23 June 2009 – 10 June 2019
- Preceded by: Alessandro Nenci
- Succeeded by: Daniele Donati

Personal details
- Born: 28 May 1975 (age 51) Livorno, Italy
- Party: Democratic Party
- Education: University of Pisa

Alessandro Franchi (born 28 May 1975) is an Italian politician who has served as a member of the Regional Council of Tuscany since 2025. He previously served as president of the Province of Livorno and mayor of Rosignano Marittimo.

== Life and career ==
Franchi was born in Livorno in 1975. He attended a technical commercial school in Cecina and later graduated in economics from the University of Pisa in 2007.

He began his political career in 1995 when he was elected as a municipal councillor in Rosignano Marittimo. He was re-elected in 1999 and subsequently served as deputy mayor and municipal assessor with responsibilities for tourism, culture, sport, and urban planning until 2009.

In June 2009, Franchi was elected mayor of Rosignano Marittimo as the candidate of a centre-left coalition and was re-elected in 2014, serving until 2019.

On 13 October 2014, he was elected president of the Province of Livorno, a position he held until 31 October 2018.

In April 2021, he was elected secretary of the Livorno provincial federation of the Democratic Party.

In the 2025 Tuscan regional elections, he was elected to the Regional Council of Tuscany for the Livorno constituency, receiving 6,605 votes.
