= Luca Salvetti =

Italian politician and journalist

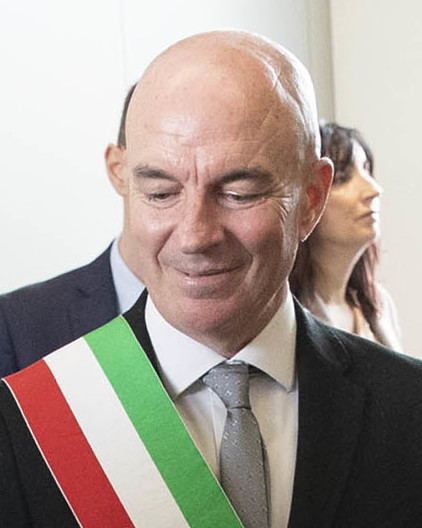

Mayor of Livorno
- Incumbent
- Assumed office 11 June 2019
- Preceded by: Filippo Nogarin

Personal details
- Born: 9 September 1966 (age 60) Livorno, Italy
- Party: Centre-left Independent
- Education: University of Pisa
- Profession: Journalist

Luca Salvetti (born 9 September 1966) is an Italian politician and journalist.

He ran for mayor of Livorno at the 2019 local elections, supported by the Democratic Party in a centre-left coalition. He was elected on 9 June and took office on 11 June 2019.

Political offices
Preceded by Filippo Nogarin	Mayor of Livorno since 2019	Incumbent
