= List of mayors of Livorno =

Mayor of Livorno
- Sindaco di Livorno

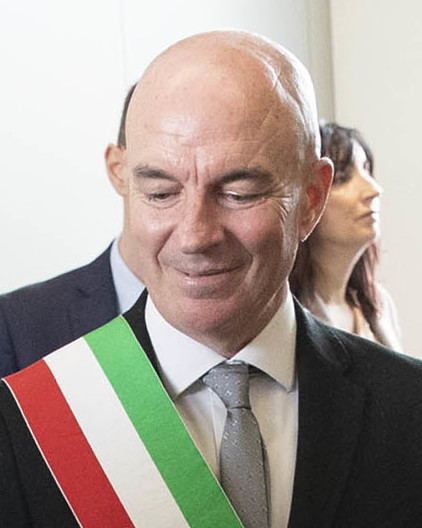
- Incumbent; Luca Salvetti since 11 June 2019
- Appointer: Popular election
- Term length: 5 years, renewable once
- Inaugural holder: Eugenio Sansoni
- Formation: 1865
- Website: Official website

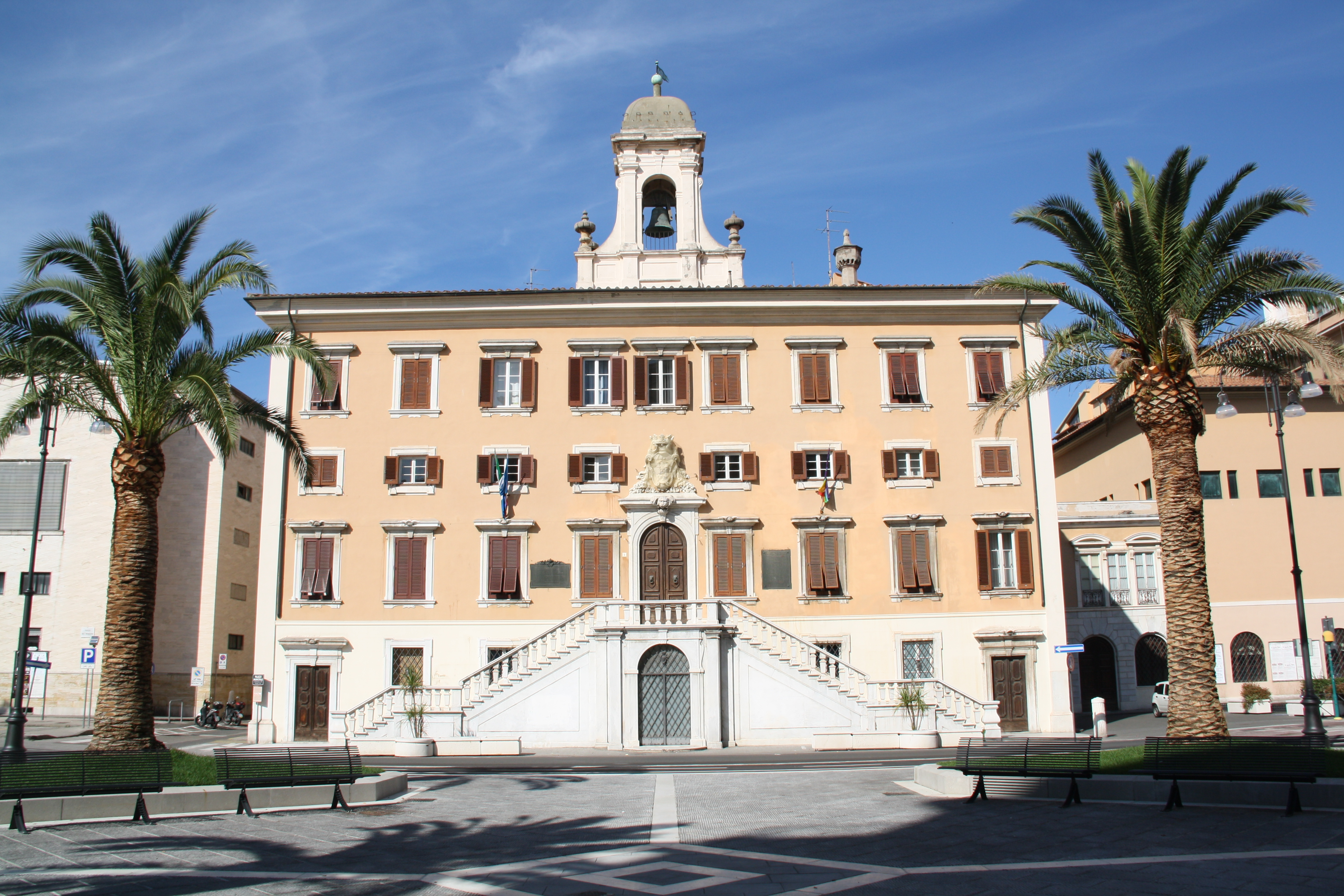
Livorno's Town Hall.

The mayor of Livorno is an elected politician who, along with Livorno's City Council, is accountable for the strategic government of Livorno in Tuscany, Italy.

The current mayor is Luca Salvetti, a centre-left independent, who took office on 11 June 2019.

== Overview ==
According to the Italian Constitution, the mayor of Livorno is member of the City Council.

The mayor is elected by the population of Livorno, who also elect the members of the City Council, controlling the mayor's policy guidelines and is able to enforce his resignation by a motion of no confidence. The mayor is entitled to appoint and release the members of his government.

Since 1995 the mayor is elected directly by Livorno's electorate: in all mayoral elections in Italy in cities with a population higher than 15,000 the voters express a direct choice for the mayor or an indirect choice voting for the party of the candidate's coalition. If no candidate receives at least 50% of votes, the top two candidates go to a second round after two weeks. The election of the City Council is based on a direct choice for the candidate with a preference vote: the candidate with the majority of the preferences is elected. The number of the seats for each party is determined proportionally.

== Kingdom of Italy (1861–1946) ==
In 1865, the Kingdom of Italy created the office of Mayor of Livorno (Sindaco di Livorno), appointed by the King himself. From 1890 to 1926 the mayor was elected by the city council. In 1926, the Fascist dictatorship abolished mayors and City councils, replacing them with an authoritarian Podestà chosen by the National Fascist Party. The office of mayor was restored in 1944 during the Allied occupation.

	Mayor	Term start	Term end	Party
–	Michele D'Angiolo	1858	1863	
1	Eugenio Sansoni	1865	1867	
–	Francesco Domenico Guerrazzi	1868	1869	
2	Federigo De Larderel	1870	1874	
3	Andrea Giovannetti	1877	1879	
4	Ottorino Giera	1879	1881	
5	Piero Donnini	1881	1883	
6	Olinto Fernandez	1884	1885	
7	Niccola Costella	1886	1893	
(5)	Piero Donnini	1894	1894	
8	Rosolino Orlando	1895	1897	
(7)	Niccola Costella	1897	1898	
9	Francesco Ardisson	1901	1901	
10	Cesare Pacchiani	1901	1903	
11	Giuseppe Malenchini	1903	1911	
12	Giovanni Targioni-Tozzetti	1911	1915	
(8)	Rosolino Orlando	1915	1920	
13	Uberto Mondolfi	1920	1922	PSI
14	Marco Tonci Ottieri della Ciaia	1923	1926	PNF
Fascist Podestà (1926–1944)
1	Marco Tonci Ottieri della Ciaia	1927	1933	PNF
2	Ezio Visconti	1933	1937	PNF
3	Aleardo Campana	1940	1944	PNF
Allied occupation (1944–1946)
15	Furio Diaz	1944	1946	PCI

== Italian Republic (since 1946) ==
=== City Council election (1946–1995) ===
From 1946 to 1995, the mayor of Livorno was elected by the City Council.

	Mayor	Term start	Term end	Party
1	Furio Diaz	1946	1954	PCI
2	Nicola Badaloni	1954	1966	PCI
3	Dino Raugi	1966	1975	PCI
4	Alì Nannipieri	1975	1985	PCI
5	Roberto Benvenuti	22 June 1985	31 December 1991	PCI
6	Gianfranco Lamberti	5 February 1992	24 April 1995	PDS

=== Direct election (since 1995) ===
Since 1995, under provisions of new local administration law, the mayor of Livorno is chosen by direct election, originally every four, then every five years.

	Mayor	Took office	Left office	Party	Coalition	Election
(6)	Gianfranco Lamberti (1947–2018)	24 April 1995	14 June 1999	PDS; DS	The Olive Tree (PDS-PPI-FdV-PdD)	1995
(6)	Gianfranco Lamberti (1947–2018)	14 June 1999	14 June 2004	PDS; DS	The Olive Tree (DS-PPI-FdV-Dem)	1999
7	Alessandro Cosimi (b. 1955)	14 June 2004	8 June 2009	DS; PD	The Olive Tree (DS-DL-PdCI-IdV)	2004
7	Alessandro Cosimi (b. 1955)	8 June 2009	9 June 2014	DS; PD	PD • IdV • SEL	2009
8	Filippo Nogarin (b. 1970)	9 June 2014	11 June 2019	M5S	M5S	2014
9	Luca Salvetti (b. 1966)	11 June 2019	13 June 2024	Ind	PD	2019
9	Luca Salvetti (b. 1966)	13 June 2024	Incumbent	Ind	PD • AVS	2024

== See also ==
- Timeline of Livorno

== Bibliography ==
- Piombanti, Giuseppe (1903). Guida storica ed artistica della città e dei dintorni di Livorno. Livorno. pp. 148–154.
