= Nicola Badaloni =

Italian philosopher and politician (1924–2005)

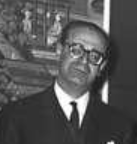

Mayor of Livorno
- In office 1954–1966
- Preceded by: Furio Diaz
- Succeeded by: Dino Raugi

Personal details
- Born: 21 December 1924 Livorno, Kingdom of Italy
- Died: 20 January 2005 (aged 80) Livorno, Italy
- Party: Italian Communist Party
- Education: University of Pisa
- Profession: Philosopher, academic

Nicola Badaloni (21 December 1924 – 20 January 2005) was an Italian philosopher, historian of philosophy, and communist politician. He served as mayor of Livorno from 1954 to 1966 and was a leading figure in Italian Marxist thought and historiography.

== Life and career ==
Born in Livorno into a family of Jewish origin on his mother's side, Badaloni experienced the impact of the Italian racial laws of 1938, which deeply influenced his early antifascist convictions. He studied philosophy at the University of Pisa, where he came into contact with influential thinkers such as Guido Calogero, Cesare Luporini, and Arturo Massolo.

He graduated in 1945 with a thesis on Retorica e storicità in Vico, under the supervision of Cesare Luporini. During the 1940s, he was active in antifascist circles and began his lifelong engagement with Marxist philosophy and historical materialism.

After World War II, Badaloni worked as a philosophy teacher and later became a university professor at the University of Pisa. He also began his political career in local administration in Livorno.

He became mayor of Livorno in 1954, a position he held until 1966. During his tenure, he focused on post-war reconstruction, urban development, social housing, and public infrastructure, while maintaining a strong emphasis on the city's working-class traditions and democratic culture.

Badaloni later became a professor of history of philosophy and published extensively on Giordano Bruno, Giambattista Vico, Tommaso Campanella, Antonio Conti, and Marxist theory. He was a prominent member of the Italian Communist Party and contributed to major cultural institutions linked to Italian Marxism, including the Gramsci Institute.

Badaloni died in Livorno on 20 January 2005.

== Works ==
- La filosofia di Giordano Bruno (1955)
- Introduzione a Giambattista Vico (1961)
- Marxismo come storicismo (1962)
- Tommaso Campanella (1965)
- Democratici e socialisti livornesi nell'Ottocento (1966)
- Antonio Conti. Un abate libero pensatore tra Newton e Voltaire (1968)
- Per il comunismo. Questioni di teoria (1972)
- Il marxismo di Gramsci (1975)
- Dialettica del capitale (1980)
- Forme della politica e teorie del cambiamento (1983)
- Giordano Bruno tra cosmologia ed etica (1988)
- Il problema dell'immanenza nella filosofia politica di Antonio Gramsci (1988)
- Laici e credenti all'alba del moderno (2005)
