= Furio Diaz =

Italian historian and politician

Mayor of Livorno
- In office 1944–1954
- Preceded by: Aleardo Campana (podestà)
- Succeeded by: Nicola Badaloni

Personal details
- Born: 14 April 1916 Livorno, Kingdom of Italy
- Died: 9 December 2011 (aged 95) Livorno, Italy
- Party: Italian Communist Party (until 1957); Italian Socialist Party (1957–1994)
- Occupation: Historian

Furio Diaz (14 April 1916 – 9 December 2011) was an Italian historian and politician who served as mayor of Livorno from 1944 to 1954.

== Life and career ==
Diaz was born in Livorno. After the fall of Fascism, he became mayor of Livorno and contributed to the city's post-war reconstruction.

Initially active in the Italian Communist Party, he left in 1957 after the Hungarian Revolution of 1956, together with intellectuals such as Antonio Giolitti, later joining the Italian Socialist Party.

From 1963 onward, Diaz pursued an academic career in history. He taught modern history at the University of Pisa and later history and historiography of modern history at the Scuola Normale Superiore. He also collaborated with major Italian historical institutions, including the Rivista Storica Italiana and the Fondazione Giangiacomo Feltrinelli.

== Works ==
- Storicismi e storicità (1956)
- Voltaire storico (1958)
- Filosofia e politica nel Settecento francese (1962–1973)
- Francesco Maria Gianni. Dalla burocrazia alla politica sotto Pietro Leopoldo di Toscana (1966)
- Per una storia illuministica (1973)
- Dal movimento dei Lumi al movimento dei popoli (1986)
- I Lorena in Toscana. La Reggenza (1988)
- L'incomprensione italiana della Rivoluzione francese (1989)
- La stagione arida (1992)
- L'utopia liberale (1995)
- Storici dell'Ottocento (2003)
