= List of members of the Regional Council of Tuscany, 2010–2015 =

The IX Legislature of the Regional Council of Tuscany, the legislative assembly of Tuscany, was inaugurated on 16 April 2010, following the 2010 regional election.

Alberto Monaci (Democratic Party) served as the president of the council, while Enrico Rossi (Democratic Party) served as president of Tuscany at the head of his first regional government.

== Members by party of election ==
=== Democratic Party ===
- Alessia Ballini (until 2 February 2011, deceased)
  - Eugenio Giani (since 15 February 2011)
- Paolo Bambagioni
- Caterina Bini (until 26 March 2013, elected to the Chamber of Deputies)
  - Aldo Morelli (since 26 March 2013)
- Anna Rita Bramerini (until 7 May 2010, appointed regional assessor)
  - Lucia Matergi (since 7 May 2010)
- Enzo Brogi
- Vittorio Bugli (until 26 March 2013, appointed regional assessor)
  - Vanessa Boretti (since 26 March 2013)
- Vincenzo Ceccarelli (until 26 March 2013, appointed regional assessor)
  - Lucia De Robertis (since 26 March 2013)
- Pieraldo Ciucchi
- Nicola Danti (until 1 July 2014, elected to the European Parliament)
  - Severino Saccardi (since 1 July 2014)
- Ivan Ferrucci
- Daniela Lastri
- Andrea Manciulli (until 26 March 2013, elected to the Chamber of Deputies)
  - Simone Naldoni (since 26 March 2013)
- Fabrizio Mattei
- Alberto Monaci (president of the Regional Council)
- Gianluca Parrini
- Giovanni Ardelio Pellegrinotti
- Rosanna Pugnalini
- Marco Remaschi
- Loris Rossetti
- Enrico Rossi (president of Tuscany)
- Marco Ruggeri
- Marco Spinelli
- Pier Paolo Tognocchi
- Matteo Tortolini
- Gianfranco Venturi

=== Federation of the Left–Greens ===
- Paolo Marini
- Mauro Romanelli
- Monica Sgherri

=== The People of Freedom ===
- Andrea Agresti
- Paolo Enrico Ammirati
- Alessandro Antichi
- Salvadore Bartolomei
- Roberto Giuseppe Benedetti
- Giovanni Donzelli
- Monica Faenzi (until 7 May 2010, candidate president, resignation)
  - Dario Locci (from 7 May 2010 to 1 February 2013, deceased)
  - Gabriele Chiurli (since 11 February 2013)
- Jacopo Maria Ferri
- Stefania Fuscagni
- Alberto Magnolfi
- Paolo Marcheschi
- Claudio Marignani
- Stefano Mugnai
- Nicola Nascosti
- Giovanni Santini
- Marco Taradash
- Tommaso Villa

=== Lega Nord Toscana ===
- Antonio Gambetta Vianna
- Claudio Morganti (until 23 April 2010, resignation)
  - Gian Luca Lazzeri (since 23 April 2010)
- Marina Staccioli

=== Italy of Values ===
- Sonia Alfano (until 23 April 2010, resignation)
  - Maria Luisa Chincarini (since 23 April 2010)
- Fabio Evangelisti (until 23 April 2010, resignation)
  - Marta Gazzarri (since 23 April 2010)
- Giuliano Fedeli
- Marco Manneschi
- Francesco Pardi (until 23 April 2010, resignation)
  - Cristina Scaletti (from 23 April 2010 to 7 May 2010, appointed regional assessor)
  - Rudi Russo (since 7 May 2010)

=== Union of the Centre ===
- Francesco Bosi (until 23 April 2010, candidate president, resignation)
  - Giuseppe Del Carlo (since 23 April 2010)
- Nedo Lorenzo Poli (until 23 April 2010, resignation)
  - Marco Carraresi (since 23 April 2010)

== Executive branch ==
The Regional Government (Giunta Regionale) was sworn in on 27 April 2010.

Member	Party	Delegate for
Enrico Rossi (president)	PD	–
Stella Targetti (vice president)	PD	Education, university and research
Salvatore Allocca	FdS	Welfare
Anna Rita Bramerini	PD	Environment
Luca Ceccobao	PD	Transports
Anna Marson	IdV	Urban planning
Riccardo Nencini	PSI	Accounting
Gianni Salvadori	PD	Agriculture
Cristina Scaletti	IdV	Culture
Daniela Caterina Rita Scaramuccia	Ind.	Healthcare
Gianfranco Simoncini	PD	Productive activities and employment

A new government sworn in in April 2013 with the substitutions of Riccardo Nencini with Vittorio Bugli, and of Luca Ceccobao with Vincenzo Ceccarelli. Following a shift in the regional political landscape due to Matteo Renzi's appointment as Prime Minister of Italy, on 16 February 2014 president Rossi removed Stella Targetti, Cristina Scaletti, and Salvatore Allocca from the executive, replacing them with Stefania Saccardi, Sara Nocentini, and Emmanuele Bobbio.
