= List of members of the Regional Council of Tuscany, 2005–2010 =

The VIII Legislature of the Regional Council of Tuscany, the legislative assembly of Tuscany, was inaugurated on 27 April 2005, following the 2005 regional election.

Riccardo Nencini (Italian Democratic Socialists) served as the president of the council, while Claudio Martini (Democrats of the Left) served as president of Tuscany at the head of his second regional government.

== Members ==
- Andrea Agresti
- Marcella Amadi
- Fabiana Angiolini
- Rossella Angiolini
- Anna Annunziata
- Alessandro Antichi (candidate president)
- Paolo Bartolozzi (until 8 July 2008, elected to the European Parliament)
  - Leopoldo Provenzali (since 8 July 2008)
- Giuliana Baudone
- Roberto Benedetti
- Maurizio Bianconi (until 14 May 2008, elected to the Chamber of Deputies)
  - Angela Notaro (since 14 May 2008)
- Caterina Bini
- Francesco Bosi (until 5 May 2005, resigned)
  - Luca Paolo Titoni (since 5 May 2005)
- Anna Rita Bramerini (until 13 May 2005, appointed regional assessor)
  - Loriano Valentini (since 13 May 2005)
- Enzo Brogi
- Eduardo Bruno
- Vittorio Bugli
- Marco Carraresi
- Anna Maria Celesti
- Adriano Chini (until 24 July 2007, appointed deputy mayor of Campi Bisenzio)
  - Nicola Danti (since 24 July 2007)
- Luca Ciabatti (candidate president)
- Pieraldo Ciucchi
- Paolo Cocchi (until 16 August 2007, appointed regional assessor)
  - Diego Ciulli (since 16 August 2007)
- Riccardo Conti (until 13 May 2005, appointed regional assessor)
  - Severino Saccardi (since 13 May 2005)
- Erasmo D'Angelis
- Giuseppe Del Carlo
- Maurizio Dinelli
- Roberta Fantozzi
- Jacopo Maria Ferri
- Filippo Fossati
- Agostino Fragai (until 13 May 2005, appointed regional assessor)
  - Daniela Belliti (since 13 May 2005)
- Stefania Fuscagni
- Federico Gelli (until 13 May 2005, appointed vice president of Tuscany)
  - Lucia Franchini (since 13 May 2005)
- Luciano Ghelli (until 24 April 2008, deceased)
  - Paolo Marini (since 14 May 2008)
- Ambra Giorgi (until 14 July 2009, appointed vice president of the Province of Prato)
  - Cristina Pacini (since 14 July 2009)
- Bruna Giovannini
- Alfonso Lippi
- Mario Lupi
- Virgilio Luvisotti
- Alberto Magnolfi
- Andrea Manciulli
- Aldo Manetti
- Paolo Marcheschi
- Claudio Martini (president of Tuscany)
- Fabrizio Mattei
- Alberto Monaci
- Marco Montemagni (until 13 May 2005, appointed regional assessor)
  - Giuseppe Bertolucci (from 13 May 2005 to 27 April 2006, appointed regional assessor)
  - Marco Montemagni (since 27 April 2006)
- Riccardo Nencini (president of the Regional Council)
- Gianluca Parrini
- Ilio Pasqui
- Niccolò Pecorini (until 17 January 2006, appointed regional secretary of the Communist Refoundation Party)
  - Carlo Bartoloni (since 17 January 2006)
- Alessia Petraglia
- Piero Pizzi
- Rosanna Pugnalini
- Marco Remaschi
- Mauro Ricci
- Fabio Roggiolani
- Enrico Rossi (until 13 May 2005, appointed regional assessor)
  - Gino Nunes (since 13 May 2005)
- Monica Sgherri
- Virgilio Simonti
- Alessandro Starnini
- Giancarlo Tei
- Pier Paolo Tognocchi
- Massimo Toschi (until 13 May 2005, appointed regional assessor)
  - Ardelio Pellegrinotti (since 13 May 2005)
- Achille Totaro (until 26 July 2006, elected to the Senate of the Republic)
  - Marco Cellai (since 26 July 2006)
- Denis Verdini (until 5 May 2005, resigned)
  - Angelo Pollina (since 5 May 2005)

== Executive branch ==
The Regional Government (Giunta Regionale) was sworn in on 6 May 2005.

Member	Party	Delegate for
Claudio Martini (president)	DS	–
Federico Gelli (vice president)	DL	
Marino Artusa	FdV	
Anna Rita Bramerini	DS	
Ambrogio Angelo Brenna	DL	
Susanna Cenni	DS	
Riccardo Conti	DS	
Agostino Fragai	DS	
Marco Montemagni	CI	
Enrico Rossi	DS	
Gianni Salvadori	DL	
Gianfranco Simoncini	DS	
Massimo Toschi	Ind.	
Maria Concetta Zoppi	DS	

On 22 June 2006, Montemagni was replaced by Giuseppe Bertolucci. On 30 July 2007, Artusa and Zoppi were replaced by Marco Betti e Paolo Cocchi; Eugenio Baronti (RC) was also appointed assessor.
