= Mario Lolini =

Italian politician (born 1958)

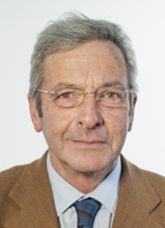

Member of the Chamber of Deputies
- In office 23 March 2018 – 13 October 2022

Personal details
- Born: 27 January 1958 (age 68) Grosseto, Italy
- Party: National Alliance; The People of Freedom; Lega
- Profession: Entrepreneur

Mario Lolini (born 27 January 1958) is an Italian politician who served as a Deputy from 23 March 2018 to 13 October 2022. On 24 December 2020, he was appointed Federal Commissioner of Lega Nord Toscana by Matteo Salvini, serving until February 2023.

== Life and career ==
Born in Grosseto on 27 January 1958, Lolini graduated from the "Guglielmo Marconi" scientific high school, and began his entrepreneurial career managing his own agricultural estate specialized in rice cultivation.

He entered politics as a member of the right-wing party National Alliance and served as a city councilor in Grosseto from 1997 to 2005 during the two terms of mayor Alessandro Antichi. Elected again in the 2006 local elections, he held the position of vice-president of the City Council. On 13 November 2009, he joined the People of Freedom party.

Lolini was a candidate for mayor of Grosseto at the 2011 municipal election, supported by the People of Freedom, Nuovo Polo per Grosseto, Lega Nord, and The Right. He received 35.41% of the votes in the first round and was defeated in the runoff on 29 May, receiving 42.72% against the center-left candidate Emilio Bonifazi. Switching to Lega Nord in preparation for the 2016 local elections, he supported the mayoral candidacy of Antonfrancesco Vivarelli Colonna and was elected again as a city councilor.

In the 2018 general election, he was elected to the Chamber of Deputies for the uninominal constituency of Grosseto, with 37% of the votes, defeating the Democratic Party candidate and former provincial president Leonardo Marras. He served as vice-president of the Thirteenth Commission for Agriculture.

On 24 December 2020, Lolini was appointed by Matteo Salvini as the regional commissioner for Lega Nord Toscana. In the 2022 general election, he was a candidate for a second term in the multi-member constituency Toscana 2 but was not elected. In February 2023, he was replaced as the head of the Tuscan federation of the party by Luca Baroncini.

== Bibliography ==
- Bonifazi, Emilio (2015). Grosseto e i suoi amministratori dal 1944 al 2015. Grosseto: Innocenti Editore.
