= Lio Lenzi =

Italian politician (1898–1960)

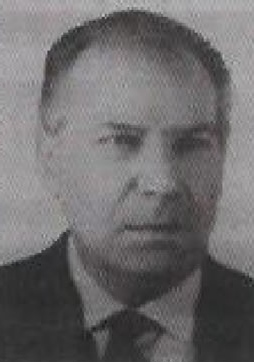

Mayor of Grosseto
- In office 17 June 1944 – 10 June 1951
- Preceded by: Angelo Maestrini (podestà)
- Succeeded by: Renato Pollini

Personal details
- Born: 13 November 1898 Livorno, Kingdom of Italy
- Died: 26 September 1960 (aged 61) Grosseto, Italy
- Party: Italian Communist Party
- Profession: glazier

Lio Lenzi (13 November 1898 – 26 September 1960) was an Italian politician.

He was the first Mayor of Grosseto elected after the fall of fascism and the establishment of the Republic of Italy.

== Life and career ==
Lenzi was born in Livorno and participated at the foundation of the Italian Communist Party in 1921. He joined the anti-fascist movement Arditi del Popolo opposing the National Fascist Party blackshirts. Being persecuted after the establishment of the fascist government, Lenzi moved to Grosseto in 1926 where he started to work as glazier and kept promoting communist ideology in that city. For this reason he was beaten and severely injured by the fascists in 1937. He was one of the regulars at the workshop of the sculptor Ivo Pacini, a meeting place for antifascist intellectuals, artists, and writers, also exhibiting as a painter in some trade union exhibitions.

During World War II he joined the Resistance movement and established the Grosseto National Liberation Committee (CLN) in 1943 together with various local representatives of the other clandestine parties.

After the Allied invasion of Italy, Lenzi was appointed Mayor of Grosseto by the CLN with the approval of the Allied forces led in Grosseto by colonel R.A.B. Hamilton on 17 June 1944. He was confirmed Mayor of Grosseto on 27 March 1946 as the result of the first democratic elections held on 10 March.

On 20 April 1949, following the discovery of weapons inside the town hall, Prefect Gaetano Orrù temporarily suspended the administration, appointing Giacinto Guida as the prefectural commissioner and entrusting the investigations to the judiciary. Two revolvers, along with bullets and magazines, were found in the office of the municipal treasurer, and other weapons were discovered just outside the building. This led to dissatisfaction in the city and among the political parties, prompting a discussion in Parliament: Interior Minister Mario Scelba, while positively assessing the precautionary measure taken by the prefect, ordered the reinstatement of the city council. On 24 May, the prefect revoked the suspension of the council but did not reinstate Lenzi as a mayor until the conclusions of the judiciary were awaited. Lenzi, cleared of all charges, was able to resume his duties as mayor on 18 November 1949. The resulting political tensions made the remainder of his term uncertain and characterized by numerous defections: as many as eighteen councilors resigned without being replaced.

Lenzi did not seek re-election in 1951 and retired from politics. The writer Luciano Bianciardi remembered Lenzi in a 1952 article: "I met Lio Lenzi, a communist, a noble craftsman from Livorno who was then making a living in his little glassblowing shop, and he later became the first democratic mayor of my city, incurring the serious ire of the 'gentlemen' who did everything possible to ruin him and succeeded: today he no longer even has his glassblowing shop".

Lenzi died in Grosseto on 26 September 1960. In 2012, a street in the San Martino neighborhood of the city was named after him.

== See also ==
- 1946 Italian local elections
- Italian resistance movement
- List of mayors of Grosseto

== Bibliography ==
- Banchi, Aristeo (1993). Si va pel mondo. Grosseto: Arci.
- Bonifazi, Emilio (2016). Grosseto e i suoi amministratori dal 1944 al 2015. Grosseto.
- Capitini Maccabruni, Nicla (1985). La Maremma contro il nazi-fascismo. Grosseto: La Commerciale.

Political offices
Preceded by Angelo Maestrini (podestà)	Mayor of Grosseto; 1944–1951	Succeeded by Renato Pollini
