= Anna Rita Bramerini =

Italian politician (born 1968)

Regional assessor of Economy and Tourism of Tuscany
- In office 6 May 2005 – 30 July 2007
- President: Claudio Martini

Regional assessor of Environment of Tuscany
- In office 30 July 2007 – 17 June 2015
- President: Claudio Martini (2007–10); Enrico Rossi (2010–15)

Personal details
- Born: 25 August 1968 (age 58) Castel del Piano, Province of Grosseto, Italy
- Party: Democrats of the Left; Democratic Party
- Education: University of Siena
- Profession: Lawyer

Anna Rita Bramerini (born 25 August 1968) is an Italian politician who served as regional assessor of Economy and Tourism (2005–2007) and of Environment (2007–2015) in the regional government of Tuscany.

== Life and career ==
Bramerini was born on 25 August 1968, in Castel del Piano, in the province of Grosseto, Italy. She resides in Arcidosso. A passionate basketball player in her youth, she spent years competing as part of the Arcidosso women's basketball team. She graduated in law from the University of Siena.

In 1995, she was elected as a councilor in the municipality of Arcidosso, where she held the position of assessor of culture, education, and social policies until 1999. Re-elected in 1999, Bramerini simultaneously served as a member of the Provincial Executive of Grosseto, with responsibilities for culture, education, equal opportunities, sports, and social policies. Between 2001 and 2004, she served as provincial assessor of culture, land reclamation, waste management, and territorial planning. Following her re-appointment in 2004, she took charge of the environment, energy, and territorial development.

From 1999 to 2004, Bramerini was also a member of the board of the Polo Universitario Grossetano.

Bramerini was elected to the Regional Council of Tuscany in April 2005 during regional elections, representing the Grosseto constituency as the lead candidate for the "United in the Olive Tree" coalition. On 13 May 2005, she was appointed to the Regional Executive as regional assessor of Economy and Tourism. On 30 July 2007, her role shifted, and she became assessor of Environment.

In the subsequent 2010 regional elections, she was re-elected in the Grosseto constituency with the Democratic Party. Her resignation from the council was formalized on 7 May 2010, to allow her to be re-confirmed in the Regional Executive as assessor of Environment. Her vacant council position was filled by Lucia Matergi.

Bramerini served in the regional government until 2015. In June 2016, she was appointed director of the Grosseto branch of CNA (Confederazione Nazionale dell'Artigianato).
