= Gabriele Bellettini =

Italian politician (1943–2022)

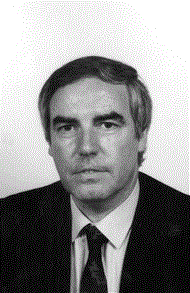
- Bellettini in 1990

Member of the Regional Council of Tuscany
- In office 28 May 1990 – 24 April 1995

Deputy mayor of Grosseto
- In office 4 April 2005 – 30 May 2006
- Mayor: Alessandro Antichi
- Preceded by: Andrea Agresti
- Succeeded by: Lucia Matergi

Mayor of Grosseto (acting)
- In office 16 May 2005 – 30 May 2006

Personal details
- Born: 15 September 1943 Tatti, Massa Marittima, Province of Grosseto, Kingdom of Italy
- Died: 17 March 2022 (aged 78) Grosseto, Tuscany, Italy
- Party: Christian Democracy; Union of the Centre
- Spouse: Laura Marcucci
- Children: 1
- Profession: Teacher

Gabriele Bellettini (15 September 1943 – 17 March 2022) was an Italian politician who served as a member of the Regional Council of Tuscany (1990–1995), and as deputy mayor and acting mayor of Grosseto (2005–2006). He was also president of the Venerable Archconfraternity of Misericordia of Grosseto from 1992 to 2017.

== Life and career ==
Bellettini was born in Tatti, Massa Marittima, in the province of Grosseto, on 15 September 1943 to Lio, an elementary teacher, and Liliana. He obtained a diploma in physical education from the Superior Institute of Physical Education (ISEF) and moved to Grosseto, where he worked as a teacher. His younger brother Paolo became a doctor. Bellettini was also the coordinator of physical education services at the Provincial Education Office in Grosseto and held positions in various local sports clubs. Additionally, he served as a council member for the local health authority and the Misericordia Hospital in Grosseto.

In 1975, he was elected as a city councilor in Grosseto. In the 1990 regional elections, he was elected to the Regional Council of Tuscany on the Christian Democracy list with 9,093 votes. Within the Tuscan assembly, Bellettini was a member of the Special Commission on Community Issues and International Cooperation, and served as the secretary of the Commission on Productive Activities.

In 1997, Bellettini was re-elected to the city council of Grosseto, where he also held the position of assessor. He was reconfirmed in both roles in 2001. In 2002, he joined the Union of the Centre party.

In April 2005, following the resignation of mayor Alessandro Antichi and deputy mayor Andrea Agresti, who were both elected to the Regional Council of Tuscany, he was appointed deputy mayor of Grosseto. The following month, he officially became the acting mayor of Grosseto, leading the municipal administration until the local elections in May 2006. As the mayoral candidate for Grosseto from the centre-right coalition, Bellettini received 37% of the votes and was defeated in the first round by the centre-left candidate Emilio Bonifazi. He retired from politics at the end of his term as city councilor in 2011.

He was also very active in social activities, and served as president of the Venerable Archconfraternity of Misericordia in Grosseto from 1992 to 2017. Under his leadership, the archconfraternity renewed its skills by managing civil protection operations in areas affected by natural disasters.

Bellettini died on 17 March 2022 in Grosseto after a long illness, and is buried in the cemetery of Misericordia.

== Bibliography ==
- Barbara Adamanti; Laura Tamburini (2021). Arciconfraternita della Misericordia di Grosseto (1792-1990). Elenco. Inventari. Grosseto: Archivio di Stato di Grosseto.
- Emilio Bonifazi (2015). Grosseto e i suoi amministratori dal 1944 al 2015. Grosseto: Innocenti Editore.
