= Fabrizio Rossi =

Italian politician

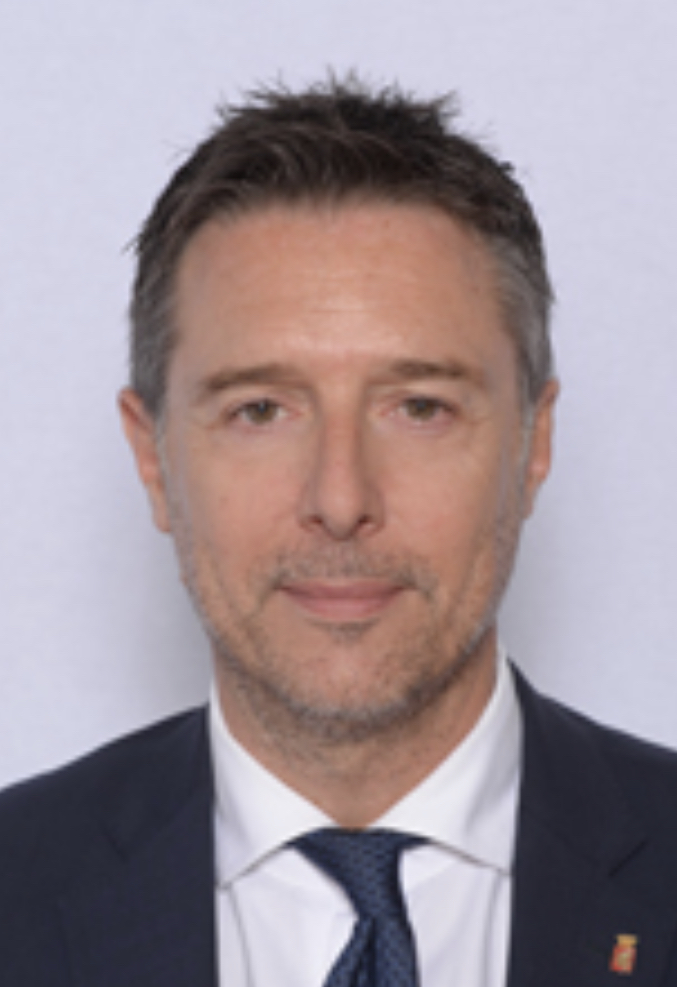

Member of the Chamber of Deputies
- Incumbent
- Assumed office 13 October 2022

Deputy mayor of Grosseto
- In office 18 October 2021 – 21 February 2023
- Mayor: Antonfrancesco Vivarelli Colonna
- Preceded by: Luca Agresti
- Succeeded by: Bruno Ceccherini

Personal details
- Born: 2 March 1975 (age 51) Montalcino, Tuscany, Italy
- Party: Brothers of Italy
- Education: University of Siena
- Profession: Lawyer

Fabrizio Rossi (born 2 March 1975) is an Italian politician who has served as a Deputy since 13 October 2022.

== Life and career ==
Born in Montalcino on 2 March 1975, Rossi grew up in Grosseto. He graduated in law from the University of Siena, and works as a lawyer.

In 2011, he was elected to the Grosseto city council for The People of Freedom. He later joined Brothers of Italy, a party of which he has been the provincial coordinator since its founding and for which he was re-elected in the 2016 municipal elections. On 27 June 2016, he was appointed as the assessor of urban planning and sports in the administration led by mayor Antonfrancesco Vivarelli Colonna.

In November 2020, he became the regional coordinator for Brothers of Italy in Tuscany. In the 2021 municipal elections in Grosseto, he was the most voted candidate for the city council, receiving 1,376 personal preferences. On 18 October, he was reappointed as assessor for a second term and named the deputy mayor of Grosseto.

In the 2022 Italian general election, he was elected as a deputy in the uninominal constituency of Grosseto with 40.7% of the votes, defeating former regional president Enrico Rossi, the candidate from the Democratic Party.
