= Andrea Agresti =

Italian politician (born 1953)

Deputy mayor of Grosseto
- In office 7 May 1997 – 4 April 2005
- Mayor: Alessandro Antichi
- Preceded by: Anna Maria Spada
- Succeeded by: Gabriele Bellettini

Member of the Provincial Council of Grosseto
- In office 19 July 2004 – 10 October 2005

Member of the Regional Council of Tuscany
- In office 27 April 2005 – 17 June 2015

Personal details
- Born: 24 November 1953 (age 72) Roccastrada, Province of Grosseto, Italy
- Party: Italian Social Movement; National Alliance; The People of Freedom; New Centre-Right
- Children: 4

Andrea Agresti (born 24 November 1953) is an Italian politician who served as a member of the Regional Council of Tuscany (2005–2015) and deputy mayor of Grosseto (1997–2005).

== Life and career ==
Agresti was born in Roccastrada, province of Grosseto, on 24 November 1953. He works as a construction entrepreneur.

After a long period of activism in the Youth Front, in 1975 he was elected for the first time as a municipal councilor for the Italian Social Movement in Grosseto. In 1995, he joined the National Alliance, a party for which he served as a member of the national assembly and the provincial executive. In 1997, he took on the role of deputy mayor of Grosseto and assessor of public works and civil protection. He was reconfirmed deputy mayor in May 2001.

In 2000, Agresti ran for the Tuscan regional election, where he received 9,555 votes but was not elected. In 2004, he was elected to the Provincial Council of Grosseto.

Agresti was elected at the Regional Council of Tuscany in the 2005 regional election. Within the Tuscan assembly, he held various positions, including vice president of the Sixth Commission "Territory and Environment", a member of the Special Labor Commission, chairman of the Inquiry Commission on waste separation, and a member of the Special Commission on relations with the European Union and the international activities of the Region. In 2009, he joined the People of Freedom party, for which he was a member of the provincial board in Grosseto and a member of the national council.

In the 2010 Tuscan elections, he was again elected in the Grosseto constituency on the People of Freedom list and was reconfirmed as a member of the Sixth Commission "Territory and Environment," serving as vice president.

After the dissolution of the People of Freedom party in 2013, he chose not to join the new Forza Italia. On 20 November 2013, he joined the New Centre-Right party, of which he served as treasurer. He ended his term as a regional councillor in June 2015.

His son Luca also served as deputy mayor of Grosseto from 2016 to 2021.

== Bibliography ==
- Bonifazi, Emilio (2015). Grosseto e i suoi amministratori dal 1944 al 2015. Grosseto: Innocenti Editore.
