= 2005 Italian regional elections =

- 3–4 April 2005

Presidents and regional assemblies of Piedmont, Lombardy, Veneto, Liguria, Emilia-Romagna, Tuscany, Marche, Umbria, Lazio, Campania, Abruzzo, Apulia, Basilicata and Calabria
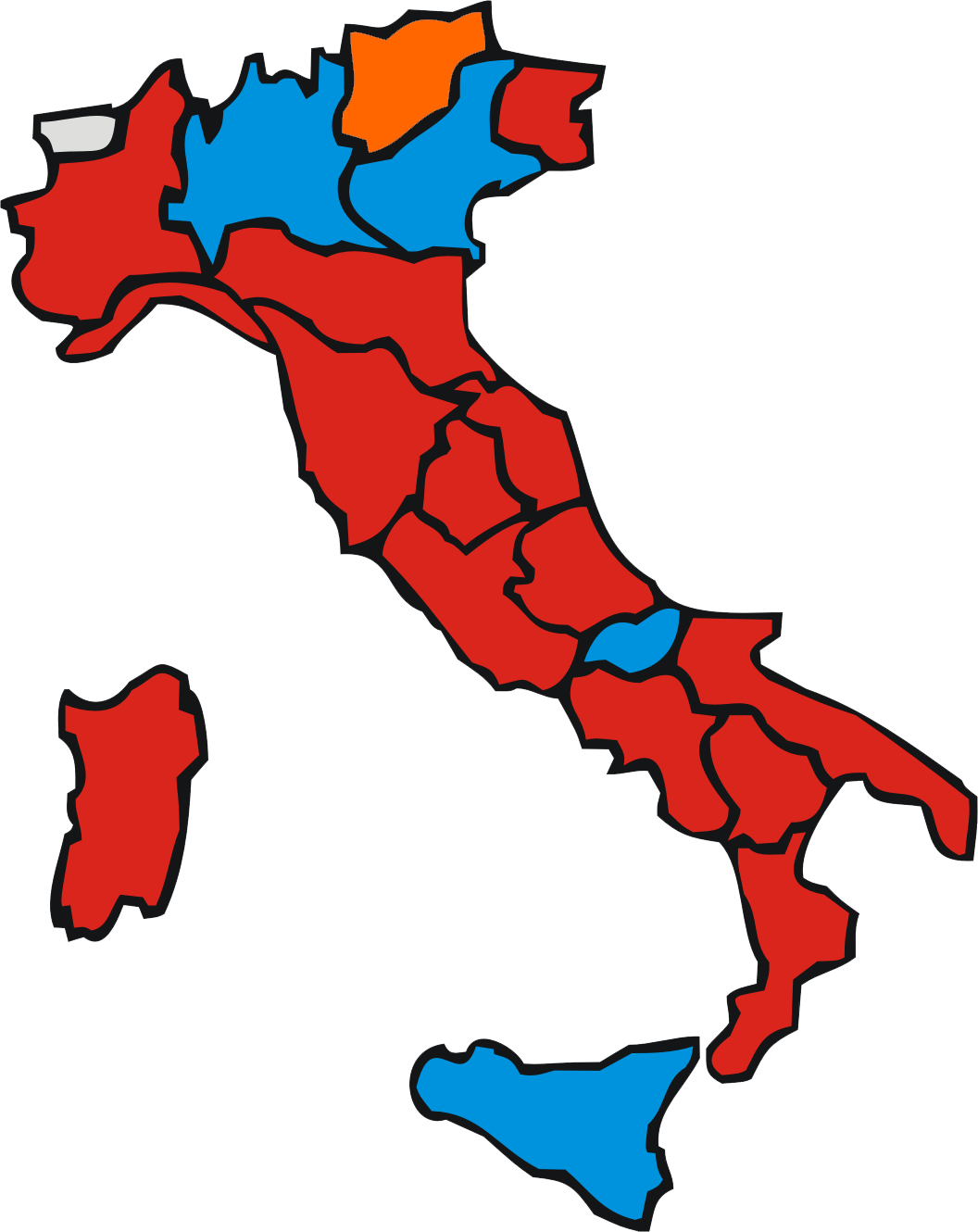
- Elected Presidents: The House of Freedoms The Union

The Italian regional elections of 2005 were held on 3–4 April.

The elections were a major victory (11–2) for the centre-left coalition The Union, led by Romano Prodi. The centre-right coalition, which had been in power at the national level since 2001, was defeated in all the regions it governed except for its strongholds, Lombardy and Veneto. As a result of the elections, the national government led by Silvio Berlusconi acknowledged defeat and entered a political crisis, which led to the fall of the Berlusconi II Cabinet and the formation of the Berlusconi III Cabinet, with some ministers being replaced.

Due to a series of bureaucratic issues involving the submission of the Social Alternative list in Basilicata, the election there was held two weeks later. In that region, the victory of the centre-left coalition brought the final tally to 12–2.

== Coalitions ==
The Union was the direct successor to The Olive Tree coalition, which had represented the centre-left in the 1996 and 2001 general elections. However, The Union also included parties from the radical left, which had not been affiliated with The Olive Tree.

== Overall results ==
=== Regional councils ===
Alliance	Votes	%	Seats
Centre-left coalition (The Union)	12,103,713	48.71	420 / 733
Centre-right coalition (House of Freedoms)	10,347,271	41.64	306 / 733
Others	2,398,369	9.65	7 / 733
Total	24,849,353	100	733 / 733
Source: Ministry of the Interior

=== Presidents of the regions ===
Region	Outgoing			Elected			Election
Region	President	Party	Alliance	President	Party	Alliance	Election
Piedmont	Enzo Ghigo	FI	Centre-right	Mercedes Bresso	DS	Centre-left	Details
Liguria	Sandro Biasotti	FI	Centre-right	Claudio Burlando	DS	Centre-left	Details
Lombardy	Roberto Formigoni	FI	Centre-right	Roberto Formigoni	FI	Centre-right	Details
Veneto	Giancarlo Galan	FI	Centre-right	Giancarlo Galan	FI	Centre-right	Details
Emilia-Romagna	Vasco Errani	DS	Centre-left	Vasco Errani	DS	Centre-left	Details
Tuscany	Claudio Martini	DS	Centre-left	Claudio Martini	DS	Centre-left	Details
Umbria	Maria Rita Lorenzetti	DS	Centre-left	Maria Rita Lorenzetti	DS	Centre-left	Details
Marche	Vito D'Ambrosio	DS	Centre-left	Gian Mario Spacca	DL	Centre-left	Details
Lazio	Francesco Storace	AN	Centre-right	Piero Marrazzo	Ind	Centre-left	Details
Abruzzo	Giovanni Pace	AN	Centre-right	Ottaviano Del Turco	SDI	Centre-left	Details
Campania	Antonio Bassolino	DS	Centre-left	Antonio Bassolino	DS	Centre-left	Details
Basilicata	Filippo Bubbico	DS	Centre-left	Vito De Filippo	DL	Centre-left	Details
Apulia	Raffaele Fitto	FI	Centre-right	Nichi Vendola	PRC	Centre-left	Details
Calabria	Giuseppe Chiaravalloti	FI	Centre-right	Agazio Loiero	DL	Centre-left	Details

== Summary by region ==
=== Piedmont ===
President				Regional council			
Candidate	Party	Votes	%	Alliance	Votes	%	Seats
Mercedes Bresso	DS	1,226,355	50.9	Centre-left	1,021,386	49.9	38
Enzo Ghigo	FI	1,133,358	47.1	Centre-right	995,573	48.7	25
Others		49,267	2.0	Others	28,770	1.4	0
Voters: 2,606,687 — Turnout: 71.4%

=== Lombardy ===
President				Regional council			
Candidate	Party	Votes	%	Alliance	Votes	%	Seats
Roberto Formigoni	FI	2,841,883	53.8	Centre-right	2,426,620	55.3	52
Riccardo Sarfatti	Ind	2,278,173	43.2	Centre-left	1,845,004	42.1	28
Others		156,815	3.0	Others	112,937	2.6	0
Voters: 5,573,739 — Turnout: 73.0%

=== Veneto ===
President				Regional council			
Candidate	Party	Votes	%	Alliance	Votes	%	Seats
Giancarlo Galan	FI	1,359,879	50.6	Centre-right	1,228,992	53.3	39
Massimo Carraro	Ind	1,138,631	42.3	Centre-left	931,698	40.4	19
Giorgio Panto	PNE	161,642	6.0	PNE	125,690	5.4	2
Others		28,565	1.1	Others	20,434	0.9	0
Voters: 2,834,638 — Turnout: 72.4%

=== Liguria ===
President				Regional council			
Candidate	Party	Votes	%	Alliance	Votes	%	Seats
Claudio Burlando	DS	491,545	52.6	Centre-left	434,617	53.4	25
Sandro Biasotti	FI	434,934	46.6	Centre-right	374,277	45.9	15
Others		7,313	0.8	Others	5,441	0.7	0
Voters: 979,852 — Turnout: 69.6%

=== Emilia-Romagna ===
President				Regional council			
Candidate	Party	Votes	%	Alliance	Votes	%	Seats
Vasco Errani	DS	1,579,989	62.7	Centre-left	1,414,717	62.0	32
Carlo Monaco	FI	886,775	35.2	Centre-right	835,620	36.6	18
Others		51,737	2.1	Others	30,713	1.4	0
Voters: 2,638,487 — Turnout: 76.7%

=== Tuscany ===
President				Regional council			
Candidate	Party	Votes	%	Alliance	Votes	%	Seats
Claudio Martini	DS	1,185,374	57.4	Centre-left	1,024,106	56.7	39
Alessandro Antichi	FI	678,491	32.8	Centre-right	595,975	33.0	21
Luca Ciabatti	PRC	151,560	7.3	PRC	50,907	8.2	5
Others		28,030	1.5	Others	30,713	2.1	0
Voters: 2,156,460 — Turnout: 71.3%

=== Umbria ===
President				Regional council			
Candidate	Party	Votes	%	Alliance	Votes	%	Seats
Maria Rita Lorenzetti	DS	316,770	63.0	Centre-left	290,232	63.2	19
Pietro Laffranco	FI	169,176	33.6	Centre-right	158,028	34.4	11
Others		16,878	3.4	Others	10,733	2.3	0
Voters: 531,529 — Turnout: 74.3%

=== Marche ===
President				Regional council			
Candidate	Party	Votes	%	Alliance	Votes	%	Seats
Gian Mario Spacca	DL	499,381	57.8	Centre-left	454,875	57.6	24
Francesco Massi	FI	333,181	38.5	Centre-right	308,324	39.1	16
Others		32,017	3.7	Others	10,733	2.3	0
Voters: 919,866 — Turnout: 71.5%

=== Lazio ===
President				Regional council			
Candidate	Party	Votes	%	Alliance	Votes	%	Seats
Piero Marrazzo	Ind	1,631,501	50.7	Centre-left	1,342,619	48.5	42
Francesco Storace	AN	1,524,712	47.4	Centre-right	1,392,029	50.3	28
Others		62,498	1.9	Others	34,449	1.2	0
Voters: 3,349,348 — Turnout: 72.7%

=== Abruzzo ===
President				Regional council			
Candidate	Party	Votes	%	Alliance	Votes	%	Seats
Ottaviano Del Turco	SDI	446,407	58.2	Centre-left	424,855	57.9	27
Giovanni Pace	AN	311,547	40.7	Centre-right	302,335	41.2	13
Others		8,517	1.1	Others	6,468	0.9	0
Voters: 825,661 — Turnout: 68.6%

=== Campania ===
President				Regional council			
Candidate	Party	Votes	%	Alliance	Votes	%	Seats
Antonio Bassolino	DS	1,891,895	61.6	Centre-left	1,823,321	63.3	38
Italo Bocchino	AN	1,056,445	34.4	Centre-right	968,309	33.6	22
Others		124,696	4.0	Others	90,802	3.1	0
Voters: 3,294,474 — Turnout: 67.7%

=== Basilicata ===
President				Regional council			
Candidate	Party	Votes	%	Alliance	Votes	%	Seats
Vito De Filippo	DL	236,479	67.0	Centre-left	236,579	68.7	20
Cosimo Latronico	FI	101,725	28.8	Centre-right	96,435	28.0	10
Others		14,763	4.2	Others	11,328	3.3	0
Voters: 372,256 — Turnout: 67.2%

=== Apulia ===
President				Regional council			
Candidate	Party	Votes	%	Alliance	Votes	%	Seats
Nichi Vendola	PRC	1,165,536	49.8	Centre-left	1,065,752	49.7	42
Raffaele Fitto	FI	1,151,405	49.2	Centre-right	1,062,753	49.5	28
Others		21,450	0.9	Others	16,159	0.8	0
Voters: 2,480,064 — Turnout: 70.5%

=== Calabria ===
President				Regional council			
Candidate	Party	Votes	%	Alliance	Votes	%	Seats
Agazio Loiero	DL	663,986	59.0	Centre-left	660,175	60.7	30
Sergio Abramo	FI	447,243	39.7	Centre-right	419,457	38.6	20
Others		15,121	1.3	Others	8,193	0.7	0
Voters: 1,188,233 — Turnout: 64.4%
