= Chiaravalloti =

Chiaravalloti is an Italian surname. Notable people with the surname include:

- Giuseppe Chiaravalloti (1934–2025), Italian judge and politician
- Nicholas Chiaravalloti (born 1972), American politician
