= Loriano Valentini =

Italian politician (born 1950)

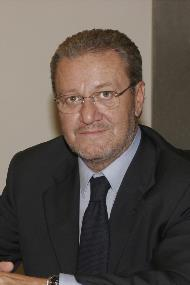

Mayor of Grosseto
- In office 23 January 1992 – 28 April 1997
- Preceded by: Flavio Tattarini
- Succeeded by: Alessandro Antichi

Member of the Regional Council of Tuscany
- In office 3 May 2000 – 30 March 2010

Personal details
- Born: 16 July 1950 (age 75) Grosseto, Italy
- Party: Italian Communist Party (1980-1991); Democratic Party of the Left (1991-1998); Democrats of the Left (1998-2007); Democratic Party (since 2007)

Loriano Valentini (born 16 July 1950) is an Italian politician.

== Life and career ==
Former member of the Italian Communist Party, he joined the Democratic Party of the Left and was elected Mayor of Grosseto in substitution of Flavio Tattarini on 23 January 1992, after the election of mayor Tattarini at the Italian Parliament. Valentini was re-elected in 1993. He ran for a new term at the 1997 Italian local elections, but was defeated by the centre-right candidate Alessandro Antichi.

He served as member of the Regional Council of Tuscany from 2000 to 2010.

Valentini was also president of Fondazione Grosseto Cultura (2012–16) and director of the historical institute ISGREC (2019–21).

== See also ==
- 1993 Italian local elections
- 1997 Italian local elections
- 2000 Italian regional elections
- 2005 Italian regional elections
- List of mayors of Grosseto

== Bibliography ==
- Bonifazi, Emilio (2015). Grosseto e i suoi amministratori dal 1944 al 2015. Grosseto.

Political offices
Preceded by Flavio Tattarini	Mayor of Grosseto; 1992–1997	Succeeded by Alessandro Antichi
