= Loiero =

Loiero is a surname. Notable people with the surname include:

- Agazio Loiero (born 1940), Italian politician
- Trent Loiero (born 2001), Australian rugby league footballer
