= Giovanni Donzelli =

Italian politician (born 1975)

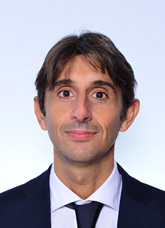
- Donzelli in 2022

Member of the Chamber of Deputies
- Incumbent
- Assumed office 23 March 2018
- Constituency: Tuscany

Member of the Regional Council of Tuscany
- In office 16 April 2010 – 11 April 2018
- Succeeded by: Paolo Marcheschi

Personal details
- Born: 28 November 1975 (age 50) Florence, Italy
- Party: Brothers of Italy (2012–present)
- Other political affiliations: MSI (1994–1995); AN (1995–2009); PdL (2009–2012)
- Education: University of Florence

Giovanni Donzelli (born 28 November 1975) is an Italian politician of Brothers of Italy serving as member of the Chamber of Deputies. He was first elected in the 2018 general election and was re-elected in 2022.

== Career ==
Donzelli was born in Florence in 1975. His parents were left-wing and his father was a member of the Italian Socialist Party. In his youth he was influenced by the massacres committed by the Mafia and the Mani pulite scandal, as well as the funerals of Giovanni Falcone and Paolo Borsellino. At the age of 19 in 1994, he joined the Italian Social Movement's National Action University Front while studying literature at the University of Florence, and later switched to the faculty of agriculture., but he never finished his studies. He was later a member of Youth Action, where he was part of the Protagonist Right faction, and in 1997 he was elected to the university's students' representative council.

In 1999, Donzelli met Giorgia Meloni and Francesco Lollobrigida for the first time, while distributing leaflets outside a high school in Florence. He met his wife on 11 May 2003, when he stood in for Meloni at a debate in Abruzzo. At Youth Action's congress in Viterbo in 2004, he was a leading supporter of Meloni's leadership bid against Carlo Fidanza, who was supported by Gianfranco Fini and Gianni Alemanno. In the 2004 local elections, Donzelli was elected city councillor of Florence for the National Alliance. In 2005, he was elected president of the party's university wing University Action. He was re-elected as city councillor of Florence in 2009, representing The People of Freedom, and in the 2010 Tuscan regional election he was elected to the Regional Council of Tuscany. In 2012 he resigned as president of University Action, and appointed Andrea Volpi as coordinator pro tempore.

In 2012, Donzelli was one of the founders of Brothers of Italy. He was the lead candidate of the party in the 2015 Tuscan regional election, and was re-elected to the regional council. He was elected to the Chamber of Deputies in the 2018 general election, and was a member of the constitutional affairs committee, the EU affairs committee and the inquiry committee on Il Forteto. He was re-elected in the 2022 general election, and became secretary of the chamber, vice president of COPASIR, organizational manager of Brothers of Italy, leader of the party in Rome, and a speculated candidate for the post of Minister for Parliamentary Relations.
