= Renato Pollini =

Italian politician (1925–2010)

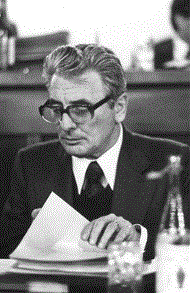

Mayor of Grosseto
- In office 29 July 1951 – 20 July 1970
- Preceded by: Lio Lenzi
- Succeeded by: Giovanni Battista Finetti

Member of the Regional Council of Tuscany
- In office 1970–1983

Member of the Senate of the Republic
- In office 12 July 1983 – 22 April 1992

Personal details
- Born: 8 February 1925 Grosseto, Kingdom of Italy
- Died: 20 August 2010 (aged 85) Florence, Tuscany, Italy
- Party: Italian Communist Party (1944-1991); Democratic Party of the Left (1991-1998)

Renato Pollini (8 February 1925 – 20 August 2010) was an Italian politician.

== Life and career ==
Pollini was a member of the Italian Communist Party and was elected mayor of Grosseto on 29 July 1951. He was re-elected for three other terms in 1956, 1960 and 1964. Pollini served as assessor and member of the Regional Council of Tuscany from 1970 to 1983.

He served at the Italian Parliament as a member of the Senate for two legislatures (IX, X).

== See also ==
- 1983 Italian general election
- 1987 Italian general election
- List of mayors of Grosseto

== Bibliography ==
- Bonifazi, Emilio (2015). Grosseto e i suoi amministratori dal 1944 al 2015. Grosseto.

Political offices
Preceded by Lio Lenzi	Mayor of Grosseto; 1951–1970	Succeeded by Giovanni Battista Finetti
