= Giancarlo Tei =

Italian politician (born 1961)

Member of the Regional Council of Tuscany
- In office 27 April 2005 – 30 March 2010

Mayor of Magliano in Toscana
- In office 26 May 1990 – 14 June 1999
- Preceded by: Patrizio Tofanelli
- Succeeded by: Moreno Gregori

Personal details
- Born: 16 March 1961 (age 65) Magliano in Toscana, Province of Grosseto, Italy
- Party: Italian Socialist Party (1979–98); Italian Democratic Socialists (1998–2007); Italian Socialist Party (2007–11); Democratic Party (2013–18)
- Profession: Surveyor

Giancarlo Tei (born 16 March 1961) is an Italian politician. A member of the Italian Socialist Party and later the Italian Democratic Socialists, he served as a member of the Regional Council of Tuscany and mayor of Magliano in Toscana. He also served as councillor and assessor in Grosseto.

== Life and career ==
Tei was born in 1961 in Magliano in Toscana, province of Grosseto. He obtained a diploma as a surveyor and has worked as an employee of the provincial administration of Grosseto. He entered politics in 1979 as a member of the Italian Socialist Party (PSI) and became its provincial secretary in 1993.

He began his administrative career in 1985 as an assessor in his hometown Magliano and was elected mayor in 1990, serving two terms until 1999. In 1998, following the reorganisation of the PSI, he served as provincial secretary of the Italian Democratic Socialists (SDI) until 2000. From 1999 to 2005, he was assessor in the provincial executive of Grosseto, with responsibility for budget and financial planning.

In the 2005 regional elections, Tei was elected to the Regional Council of Tuscany in the Grosseto constituency on the Uniti nell'Ulivo list. He served as secretary of the Second Council Committee on Agriculture, and sat on oversight and inquiry committees. He later joined the new Italian Socialist Party.

Tei was also elected to the Grosseto City Council in 2006, serving as Socialist group leader. In 2011, he joined a civic list and was appointed assessor for environment, and later for urban planning, in the second Bonifazi administration. In 2013, he became a member of the Democratic Party.

He ran unsuccessfully for mayor of Magliano again in the 2018 and 2023 elections as the candidate of a civic list, but won a seat as municipal councillor on both occasions.
