= Flavio Tattarini =

Italian politician (born 1943)

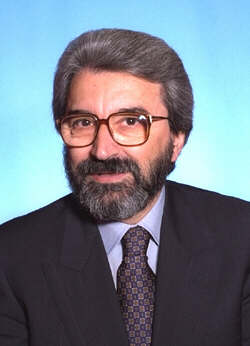

Member of the Chamber of Deputies
- In office 15 April 1992 – 29 May 2001

Mayor of Grosseto
- In office 15 February 1982 – 23 January 1992
- Preceded by: Giovanni Battista Finetti
- Succeeded by: Loriano Valentini

Personal details
- Born: 14 August 1943 (age 82) Santa Fiora, Province of Grosseto, Kingdom of Italy
- Party: Italian Communist Party (1980-1991); Democratic Party of the Left (1991-1998); Democrats of the Left (1998-2007)
- Profession: employee

Flavio Tattarini (born 14 August 1943) is an Italian politician.

== Life and career ==
Former member of the Italian Communist Party, he was elected mayor of Grosseto on 15 February 1982 after the resignation of Giovanni Battista Finetti. He was re-elected in 1985 and resigned on 7 August 1987 after an internal government crisis. Re-elected for the third time in 1988, he remained in office until 23 January 1992, when he resigned again in order to run for the Chamber of Deputies at the 1992 Italian general election.

He served at the Italian Parliament for three legislatures (XI, XII, XIII).

== See also ==
- 1985 Italian local elections
- 1988 Italian local elections
- 1992 Italian general election
- 1994 Italian general election
- 1996 Italian general election
- List of mayors of Grosseto

== Bibliography ==
- Bonifazi, Emilio (2015). Grosseto e i suoi amministratori dal 1944 al 2015. Grosseto.

Political offices
Preceded by Giovanni Battista Finetti	Mayor of Grosseto; 1982–1992	Succeeded by Loriano Valentini
