= Giovanni Battista Finetti =

Italian politician (1940–1983)

Mayor of Grosseto
- In office 20 July 1970 – 15 February 1982
- Preceded by: Renato Pollini
- Succeeded by: Flavio Tattarini

Personal details
- Born: 15 January 1940 Bagno di Gavorrano, Province of Grosseto, Kingdom of Italy
- Died: 2 March 1983 (aged 43) Grosseto, Tuscany, Italy
- Party: Italian Communist Party

Giovanni Battista Finetti (Italian: [dʒoˈvanni batˈtista fiˈnetti]; 15 January 1940 – 2 March 1983) was an Italian politician.

== Life and career ==
Born in Bagno di Gavorrano in 1940, he attended the technical institute in Livorno for three years before leaving his studies in 1956 to join the Italian Communist Party at the age of sixteen. Following a political training course in Rome organized by the party, he became secretary of the Italian Communist Youth Federation (FGCI) in Bagno di Gavorrano and, in 1959, was appointed provincial secretary.

In 1965, he registered as a freelance journalist with the Italian Press Association and worked as a correspondent for L'Unità. After serving as head of propaganda and press for the party in Grosseto, he was appointed secretary of Grosseto's municipal committee in 1967. Between 1965 and 1970, he also served as a municipal councillor in Gavorrano.

Following the 1970 local elections, on 20 July, Finetti was elected mayor of Grosseto, succeeding Renato Pollini. He was re-elected for two additional terms in 1975 and 1980. He resigned on 15 February 1982, and Flavio Tattarini succeeded him as head of the municipal administration.

Finetti was involved in a car accident in Istia d'Ombrone on 23 January 1983 and died on 2 March of the same year. In Grosseto, a street was named after him in 2012, and the municipal swimming pool was dedicated to him in 2015.

His death has been often considered "suspicious" by the conspiracy theories about the so-called "Ustica affair".

== Bibliography ==
- Bonifazi, Emilio (2015). Grosseto e i suoi amministratori dal 1944 al 2015. Grosseto: SEMAR.

== See also ==
- List of mayors of Grosseto

Political offices
Preceded by Renato Pollini	Mayor of Grosseto; 1970–1982	Succeeded by Flavio Tattarini
