= Lucia Matergi =

Italian politician (born 1951)

Deputy mayor of Grosseto
- In office 15 June 2006 – 17 May 2010
- Mayor: Emilio Bonifazi
- Preceded by: Gabriele Bellettini
- Succeeded by: Paolo Borghi

Member of the Regional Council of Tuscany
- In office 7 May 2010 – 17 June 2015

Personal details
- Born: 1 May 1951 (age 75) Grosseto, Italy
- Party: Democratic Party
- Spouse: Nino Muzzi
- Education: Sapienza University of Rome
- Profession: Teacher

Lucia Matergi (born 1 May 1951) is an Italian politician who served as a member of the Regional Council of Tuscany (2010–2015) and deputy mayor of Grosseto (2006–2010).

== Life and career ==
Matergi was born in Grosseto on 1 May 1951. She graduated with a degree in Modern Literature from the Sapienza University of Rome with a thesis on Salvatore Quasimodo's translations of Greek poets. She taught Italian and Latin in various high schools, finally at the Antonio Rosmini High School in Grosseto.

Since the 1980s, she has been the author of projects related to multiculturalism and school theatre. Since 1997, she has launched the Provincial Exhibition of School Theatre "City of Grosseto Award" (Rassegna Provinciale del Teatro della Scuola-Premio Città di Grosseto). She also collaborated with the theatre magazine Scespir.

She entered politics in 2001, contributing to the foundation of the local Democratic Party, of which she was also a member of the regional board. Matergi served as deputy mayor of Grosseto from 2006 to 2010, as well as the assessor of education, university affairs, social policies, and cultural institutions.

In the 2010 regional elections, Matergi was a candidate for the Regional Council of Tuscany. On 7 May 2010, she was elected to replace councilor Anna Rita Bramerini, who had been appointed regional assessor. In the regional assembly, she was a member of the Fourth Commission "Health and Social Policies", within which she dealt with gender policies by coordinating the regional inquiry into family counseling services.

Matergi was the regional vice president and a member of the national leadership of ANCI-Federsanità. Since 2007, she has been engaged in establishing the Health Society of the Grosseto Area (Società della Salute dell'Area Grossetana), and in January 2010 she became its president. In 2012, she became president of the Gramsci Institute of Grosseto, later incorporated into the Fondazione Luciano Bianciardi. In 2014, she founded the Rete Toscana Teatro Scuola, starting a collaboration with the magazine La Ricerca by Loescher.

From September 2006 to May 2007, Matergi served as president of the Fondazione Luciano Bianciardi. In 2018, she was appointed scientific director, organizing the official celebrations for the centenary of the writer in 2022 and 2023.

== Bibliography ==
- Bonifazi, Emilio (2015). Grosseto e i suoi amministratori dal 1944 al 2015. Grosseto: Innocenti Editore.
