= Angelo Ferri =

Italian politician (1815–1874)

Gonfalonier of Grosseto
- In office 1859–1864
- Preceded by: Luigi Romualdi
- Succeeded by: Luigi Romualdi

Member of the Chamber of Deputies
- In office 1867–1870

Mayor of Grosseto
- In office 1870–1870
- Preceded by: Domenico Ponticelli
- Succeeded by: Ippolito Andreini

President of the Provincial Council of Grosseto
- In office September 1862 – 1863
- Succeeded by: Lorenzo Grottanelli
- In office 1867–1874
- Preceded by: Bernardino Martinucci
- Succeeded by: Gaspero Petruccioli

Personal details
- Born: 10 November 1815 Grosseto, Grand Duchy of Tuscany
- Died: 12 October 1874 (aged 58) Strada in Casentino, Castel San Niccolò, Province of Arezzo, Kingdom of Italy
- Occupation: Notary

Angelo Ferri (10 November 1815 – 12 October 1874) was an Italian notary and politician who served as gonfalonier of Grosseto (1859–1864), deputy (1867–1870), and mayor of Grosseto (1870).

== Life and career ==
Born in Grosseto, in the Grand Duchy of Tuscany, Ferri graduated in law from the University of Siena and worked as a notary in his hometown. In 1849, he was elected president of the local bank Cassa di Risparmio Grossetana and joined the public health committee that led the Tuscan government of Francesco Domenico Guerrazzi until the restoration of the Lorraine dynasty.

Active in politics, he represented Poppi at the Tuscan Assembly of 1859. From 1860 to 1864, he served as gonfalonier of the municipality of Grosseto, and later was mayor in 1870. He also served as president of the Provincial Council of Grosseto. Among his numerous civic roles, Ferri was president of the Banca del Popolo, the Agricultural Consortium, and the Teatro degli Industri, as well as a member of the board of the National Bank.

In the 1867 general elections, he was elected in the Grosseto constituency with 726 votes in the first round on 10 March and 828 votes in the runoff on 17 March, defeating candidate Edoardo De Montel. Ferri ran again in the 1870 elections, but received only 65 votes, failing to pass the first round; in the runoff, his fellow townsman Giovanni Morandini won.

He died in Strada in Casentino on 12 October 1874.

Political offices
Preceded by Domenico Ponticelli	Mayor of Grosseto; 1870	Succeeded by Ippolito Andreini
