= Cemetery of Misericordia (Grosseto) =

Cemetery in Grosseto, Italy

- Interactive map of Cemetery of Misericordia

Details
- Established: 1854
- Location: Grosseto, Tuscany
- Country: Italy
- Coordinates: 42.7701°N 11.107°E

The cemetery of Misericordia (cimitero della Misericordia) is a cemetery located on Via Aurelia Nord in Grosseto, Tuscany, Italy. Managed by the lay association Archconfraternity of Misericordia of Grosseto (Arciconfraternita della Misericordia di Grosseto), it was established in 1854 and is one of the two main cemeteries in the city.

== History ==
The first suburban cemetery of Grosseto, called "Leopoldino", was established in 1766 outside the Medici walls, by order of Grand Duke Peter Leopold, and designed by Leonardo Ximenes. In the 19th century, due to poor hygienic conditions, the Archconfraternity of Misericordia of Grosseto decided to build a new cemetery for its members, beginning construction in 1854 with the support of Grand Duke Leopold II.

Designed by Enrico Ciampoli, work lasted over ten years, with some sculptures already completed by 1873. By 1894, the cemetery still appeared unfinished, but notable art works were already present, with increasing interest in funerary sculptures among wealthy families and local and Sienese artists.

In the 20th century, the cemetery was expanded and, thanks to urban development, became an integral part of Grosseto's city center, situated near the railway station.

== Works of art ==
The cemetery has been home to numerous sculptural and architectural works from 1873 to the present day. Initially, in 1873, a monument was placed in memory of Isolina Ademollo by Giuseppe Domenico Felli, who also created a monument to Venanzio Vibri in 1881. Sienese sculptor Tito Sarrocchi created monuments dedicated to Luigi Ponticelli (1880) and Renieri Fanelli (1883). In 1897, the Sellari mausoleum in Egyptian Revival style was built, and in 1902, wrought iron gates designed by Lorenzo Porciatti were crafted by Luciano Zalaffi.

Brothers Vincenzo and Ferruccio Pasquali contributed various monuments and decorative works, including medallions and chapels. Fulvio Corsini created a significant symbolic sculpture (1903) dedicated to the Civinini family.

Among the artists of the 1920s-1930s, notable figures include Tolomeo Faccendi and Ivo Pacini, with works such as commemorative steles, marble decorations, and bas-reliefs. The Pizzetti chapel features a St. Francis sculpture by Belisario Baggiani.

Architecturally, the main chapel and several family chapels stand out, including those designed by Ernesto Ganelli.

== Notable burials ==
- Benedetto Ponticelli (1840–1899), politician and patriot
- Lorenzo Porciatti (1864–1928), architect
- Tolomeo Faccendi (1905–1970), sculptor
- Luciano Bianciardi (1922–1971), writer, journalist, and translator
- Ernesto Ganelli (1901–1985), civil engineer
- Gabriele Bellettini (1943–2022), politician
- Pietro Citati (1930–2022), writer and literary critic

== Sources ==
- Ademollo, Alfonso (1894). Monumenti medievali e moderni della provincia di Grosseto. Grosseto.
- Carini, Umberto; Barabesi, Paola (1998). La Misericordia a Grosseto. Otto secoli di sanità e assistenza. Grosseto: Editrice Maremma.
- Mariagrazia Celuzza; Mauro Papa, eds. (2013). Grosseto visibile. Guida alla città e alla sua arte pubblica. Arcidosso: Edizioni Effigi.
- Enrico Crispolti; Anna Mazzanti; Luca Quattrocchi, eds. (2005). Arte in Maremma nella prima metà del Novecento. Milan: Silvana Editoriale.
