= Benedetto Ponticelli =

Italian patriot and politician (1840–1899)

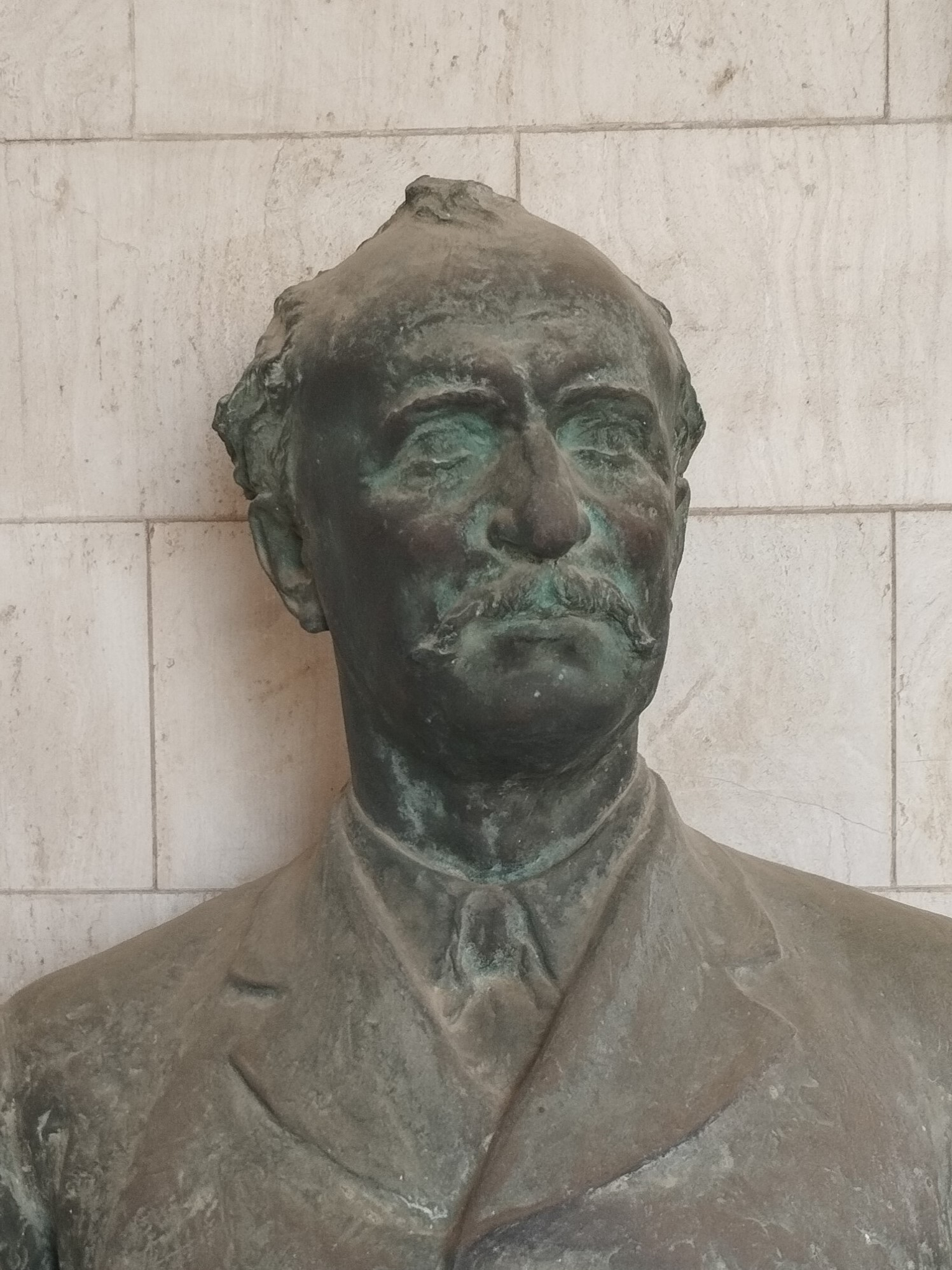
- Bust of Ponticelli in the cemetery of Misericordia

Mayor of Grosseto
- In office 1888–1891
- Preceded by: Ippolito Luciani
- Succeeded by: Giovanni Pizzetti

Personal details
- Born: 24 July 1840 Roccastrada, Grand Duchy of Tuscany
- Died: 5 May 1899 (aged 58) Grosseto, Kingdom of Italy
- Occupation: Landowner

Benedetto Ponticelli (24 July 1840 – 5 May 1899) was an Italian patriot, landowner, agronomist and politician who served as mayor of Grosseto (1888–1891).

== Life and career ==
Born in Roccastrada in 1840 to Luigi and Marianna Passalacqua, in a wealthy family of landowners, he became interested in the patriotic ideals of the Risorgimento at a very young age, actively participating in the Third Italian War of Independence.

As a sergeant of the 3rd Battalion of the Tuscan National Guard, he took part in the Umbrian campaign of 1860–1861, while in 1866 he was a lieutenant and standard-bearer in the 84th Mobilized National Guard. The following year, he secretly hosted on his estate in Vallemaggiore (Rispescia) the "Maremma" column led by Nicola Guerrazzi, which fought in Farnese against the papal troops, supplying it with weapons and provisions. Discovered, he was denounced but no action was ever taken. In 1870, he was appointed captain of the Italian National Guard.

A prominent and influential figure in post-unification Grosseto society, he was also politically active as a city councilor and several times acted as mayor after the resignation of Ippolito Luciani. In June 1888, he was officially appointed mayor of Grosseto by King Umberto I. He was the last mayor of Grosseto to receive the position by royal appointment; at the council meeting on 18 November 1889, lawyer Vittorio Valeri was unanimously elected mayor but declined the position: Ponticelli was then elected, becoming the city's first elected mayor. He remained in office until 1891. During his administration, a commission was established to design the first city's aqueduct, which was inaugurated nine years later by mayor Carlo Ponticelli. Among his other initiatives as mayor were the establishment of a normal school and a gymnasium, and the renovation of the courthouse.

Known for his experiments in the agricultural field, he was also president of the Agricultural Assembly of Grosseto.

He died in his home on Via Montebello in Grosseto on 5 May 1899, and was buried in the Misericordia cemetery.

== Sources ==
- Gaetano Badii (1933). "Benedetto Ponticelli". In Michele Rosi (ed.). Dizionario del Risorgimento nazionale. Vol. 3. Milan: Vallardi. p. 929.
- Enrico Cappelli (E. Cleppali) (2017). Giorgio Bonfiglioli (ed.). Grosseto. Appunti storici. Grosseto: Innocenti Editore.
- Adone Innocenti (1928). Grosseto. Storia ed arte. Grosseto: Etruria Nuova.
- Lucio Niccolai, ed. (2008). L'odore della terra. Biografie di uomini e donne che hanno fatto la Maremma tra XIX e XX secolo. Arcidosso: Edizioni Effigi.

Political offices
Preceded by Ippolito Luciani	Mayor of Grosseto; 1888–1891	Succeeded by Giovanni Pizzetti
