= Ivo Pacini =

Italian sculptor

- Born: 25 November 1883; Grosseto, Kingdom of Italy
- Died: 1959 (aged 75–76); Grosseto, Italy
- Occupation: Sculptor

Ivo Pacini (25 November 1883 – 1959) was an Italian sculptor, active mainly in his native Tuscany.

== Life and career ==
Ivo Pacini was born in Grosseto in 1883 into a family of artists: his father, Ulisse Pacini, was a musician and bandmaster, while his mother was a stage actress. His brother Ugo was active in the local anarchist movement. He trained in the workshop of sculptor Vincenzo Pasquali and began working independently in the 1910s–1920s.

His first documented work is a marble monument to the Catalan anarchist Francisco Ferrer, erected in Roccatederighi in 1914. He also produced funerary sculptures, plaques, and medallions, mainly for the Misericordia cemetery in Grosseto. Several early works, including busts of figures such as Bovio, Carducci, and Socci, as well as the plaque for engineer Tosini of the Croce d'Oro, are now lost.

The sculptor was described in a local chronicle of the time as "a humble artist who lives quietly, does not exhibit his works, does not seek attention and does not wish to be talked about. Some know him as a marble worker, having seen him square a window sill or carve stone for cemeteries; others take him for a stonemason, watching him work with a chisel on blocks of granite".

In the 1920s he opened a workshop in Via Garibaldi, which became a meeting point for local artists and intellectuals. He produced numerous World War I memorials across the province, and his studio was frequented by figures such as Guelfo Civinini and Vincenzo Cardarelli. Artists including Tolomeo Faccendi trained there, helping to form the so-called Grosseto artistic milieu, which led to the first Maremma art exhibition on 24 May 1933. Painter Carlo Gentili recalled that "Ivo Pacini's workshop was the nest for all of us; painters, sculptors, writers [...], musicians, and politicians, from socialists and communists to Freemasons, anarchists, and republicans, met there."

Among his later works were a bust of Giuseppe Mazzini placed in 1950 on the Molino a Vento bastion of the walls of Grosseto and an unrealised monument to Andrea da Grosseto. Pacini died in 1959.

== Works (selection) ==
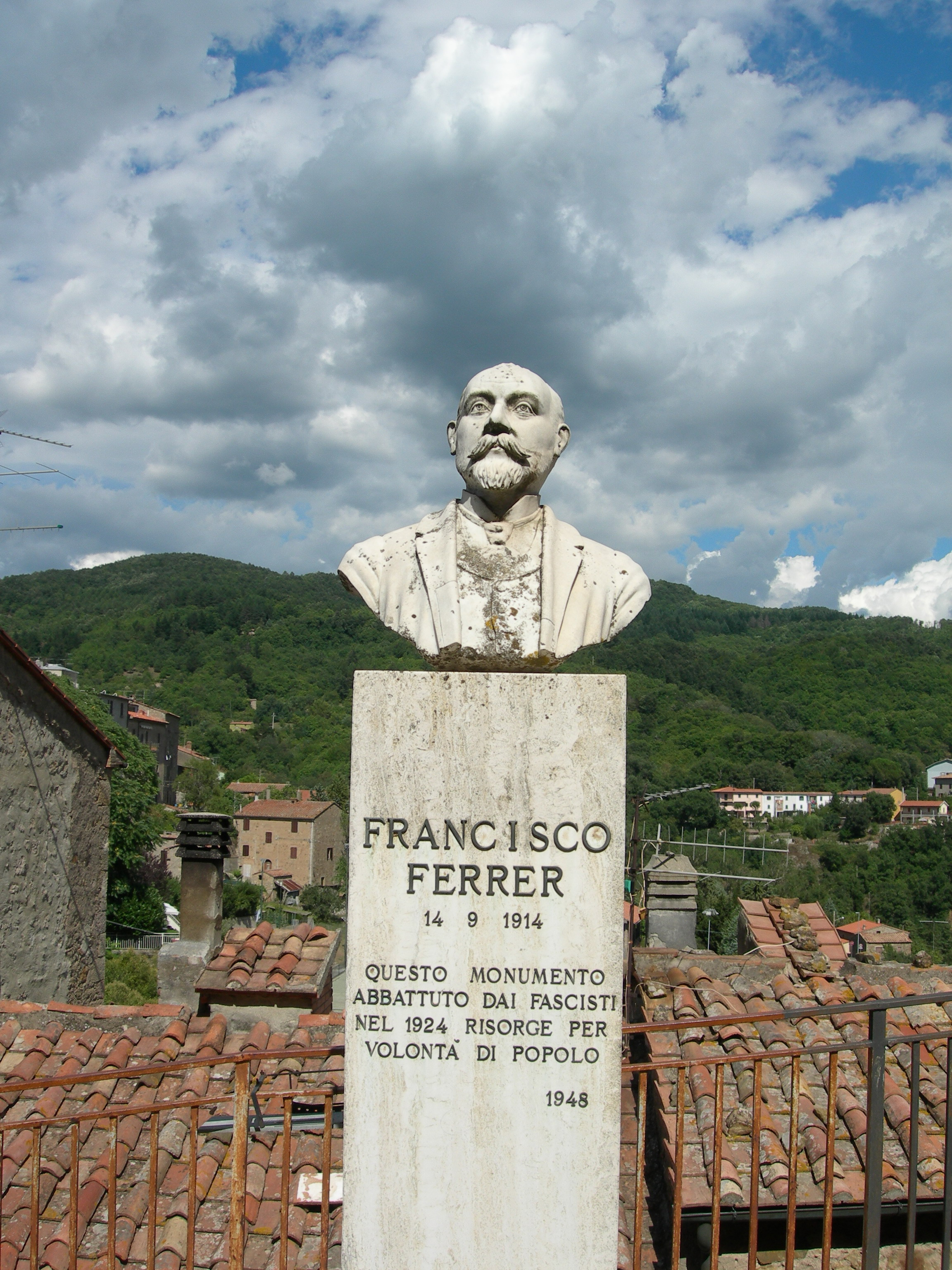
The monument to Francisco Ferrer in Roccatederighi. The original monument (1914) was destroyed by the Fascists in 1924, and a new bust was re-installed in 1948

- Monument to Francisco Ferrer, Roccatederighi (1914)
- World War I Memorial, Campagnatico (1922)
- World War I Memorial, Orbetello (1922)
- World War I Memorial, Gavorrano (1923)
- World War I Memorial, Montorgiali (1923)
- World War I Memorial, Roselle (1925)
- World War I Memorial, Istia d'Ombrone (1931)
- Pietà in the Ulmi Chapel, cemetery of Misericordia, Grosseto (1933)
- Ecce Homo in the Del Fa Chapel, cemetery of Misericordia, Grosseto (1939)
- Monument to Giuseppe Mazzini, bastion Molino a Vento, Grosseto (1950)

== Sources ==
- Mariagrazia Celuzza; Mauro Papa, eds. (2013). Grosseto visibile. Guida alla città e alla sua arte pubblica. Arcidosso: Edizioni Effigi.
- Enrico Crispolti; Anna Mazzanti; Luca Quattrocchi, eds. (2006). Arte in Maremma nella prima metà del Novecento. Milan: Silvana Editoriale.
