= Pietro Citati =

Italian writer and literary critic (1930–2022)

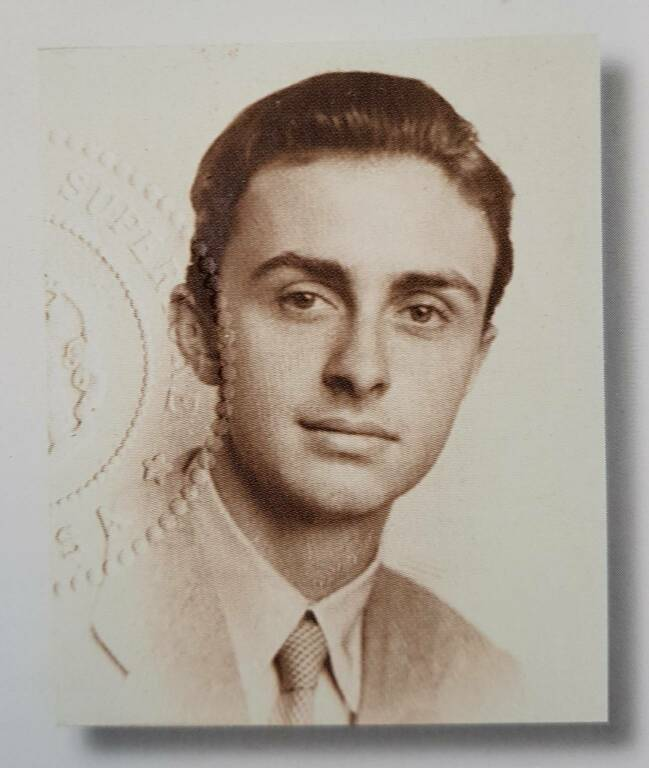
Pietro Citati

Pietro Citati (20 February 1930 – 28 July 2022) was an Italian writer and literary critic.

He was born in Florence. He wrote critical biographies of Goethe, Alexander the Great, Kafka and Marcel Proust as well as a short memoir on his thirty-year friendship with Italo Calvino.

In Kafka, Pietro Citati had the great writer declare: "'I am like you, I am a man like you, I suffer and rejoice as you do, like a meticulous and buoyant angel, a being who lives far away in a world that did not belong even to him."

From 1973 to 1988, he contributed to the cultural section of Corriere della Sera and was the literary critic for la Repubblica between 1988 and 2011, before returning to write for Corriere della Sera.

He died at his villa in Roccamare, in the municipality of Castiglione della Pescaia, on 28 July 2022 at the age of 92. He was buried at the Cemetery of Misericordia in Grosseto.

== Biography ==
Born in Florence to a noble Sicilian family, he spent his childhood and adolescence in Turin, where he attended the Istituto Sociale and, later, the Liceo Classico Massimo d'Azeglio high school. In 1942, during the war, he moved with his family to Liguria.After the war, he returned to Tuscany and graduated in 1951 in modern literature from the University of Pisa as a student of the Scuola Normale Superiore. He began his career as a literary critic by contributing to magazines such as Il Punto - where he met Pier Paolo Pasolini - L'Approdo letterario and Paragone.

From 1954 to 1959 he taught Italian in vocational schools in Frascati and the outskirts of Rome. In the 1960s he wrote for the newspaper Il Giorno (newspaper). From 1973 to 1988 he was literary critic for Corriere della Sera; from 1988 to 2011 for la Repubblica; from 2011 to June 2017 again for Corriere della Sera; from 28 July 2017 again at la Repubblica.

A multifaceted writer, he successfully tried his hand at non-fiction and literary biography of great writers (Alessandro Manzoni, Kafka, Goethe, Tolstoy, Katherine Mansfield, Giacomo Leopardi,). Several of his pages were also devoted to the myths of ancient peoples and Greekness (Homer above all) and to religious and philosophical doctrines such as Hermeticism.

Married to Tuscan Elena Londini, he spent much time at his villa in Roccamare, in the municipality of Castiglione della Pescaia (GR), where he died on 28 July 2022 at the age of 92. He is buried at the Cemetery of Misericordia (Grosseto) in Grosseto, Italy.

== Selected Bibliography ==
- Goethe (Mondadori, 1970)
- Alexandro (Rizzoli, 1974)
- Tolstoy (Longanesi, 1983)
- Kafka (Rizzoli, 1987)
- La colomba pugnalata. Proust e la richerche (Mondadori, 1995)
- La mente colorata. Ulisse e l'Odissea (Mondadori, 2002)
- La morte della farfalla. Zelda e Francis Scott Fitzgerald (Mondadori, 2006)

== Works in English translation ==
- Goethe, trans. Raymond Rosenthal (Dial Press, 1974)
- Tolstoy, trans. Raymond Rosenthal (Schocken Books, 1986)
- Kafka, trans. Raymond Rosenthal (Knopf, 1990)

== Filmography ==
- Dans la peau d'Italo Calvino (2012), documentary by Damian Pettigrew with Pietro Citati and Neri Marcorè in the role of Italo Calvino
