= List of mayors of Grosseto =

Mayor of Grosseto
- Sindaco di Grosseto

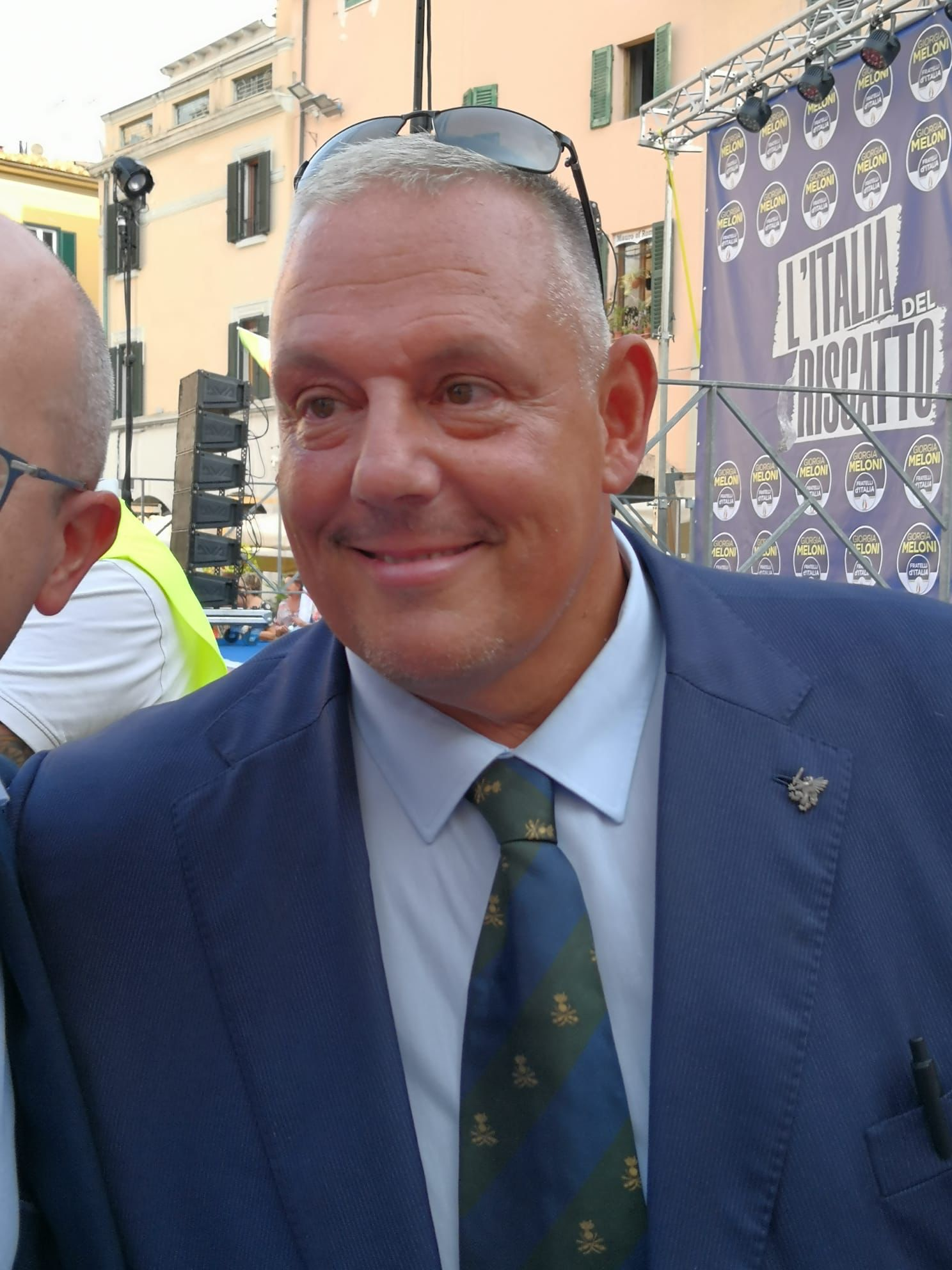
- Incumbent; Antonfrancesco Vivarelli Colonna since 23 June 2016
- Appointer: Popular election
- Term length: 5 years, renewable once
- Inaugural holder: Domenico Ponticelli
- Formation: 1865
- Deputy: Bruno Ceccherini
- Website: Official website

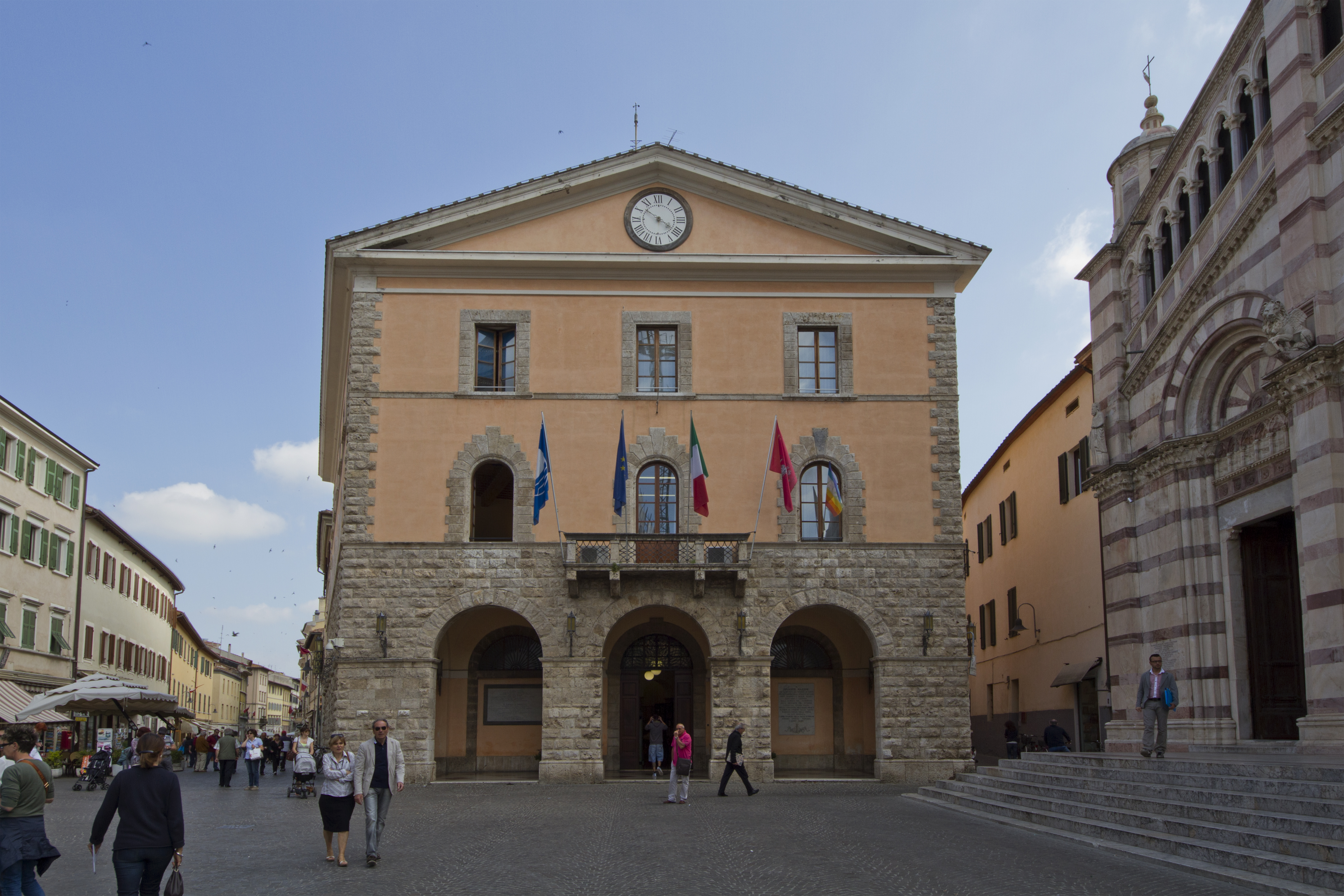
Grosseto's Town Hall.

The mayor of Grosseto is an elected politician who, along with the Grosseto City Council, is accountable for the strategic government of Grosseto in Tuscany, Italy.

The current mayor is Antonfrancesco Vivarelli Colonna, a centre-right independent, who took office on 23 June 2016.

== Overview ==
According to the Italian Constitution, the mayor of Grosseto is member of the City Council.

The mayor is elected by the population of Grosseto, who also elects the members of the City Council, controlling the mayor's policy guidelines and is able to enforce his resignation by a motion of no confidence. The mayor is entitled to appoint and release the members of his government.

Since 1993 the mayor is elected directly by Grosseto's electorate: in all mayoral elections in Italy in cities with a population higher than 15,000 the voters express a direct choice for the mayor or an indirect choice voting for the party of the candidate's coalition. If no candidate receives at least 50% of votes, the top two candidates go to a second round after two weeks. The election of the City Council is based on a direct choice for the candidate with a preference vote: the candidate with the majority of the preferences is elected. The number of the seats for each party is determined proportionally.

== Kingdom of Italy (1861–1946) ==
In 1865, the Kingdom of Italy created the office of the mayor of Grosseto (Sindaco di Grosseto), appointed by the King himself. From 1889 to 1926 the mayor was elected by the city council. In 1926, the Fascist dictatorship abolished mayors and City councils, replacing them with an authoritarian Podestà chosen by the National Fascist Party. The office of mayor was restored in 1944 during the Allied occupation.

	Mayor	Term start	Term end	Party
–	Angelo Ferri	1859	1864	
–	Luigi Romualdi	1864	1865	
1	Domenico Ponticelli	1865	1867	
2	Angelo Ferri	1870	1870	
3	Ippolito Andreini	1870	1879	
4	Ippolito Luciani	1880	1886	
5	Benedetto Ponticelli	1888	1891	
6	Giovanni Pizzetti	1891	1894	
7	Carlo Ponticelli	1895	1902	
8	Egidio Bruchi	1902	1919	
9	Tito Bolognesi	1920	1921	PSI
10	Benedetto Pallini	1922	1924	PLI
11	Ado Scaramucci	1925	1926	PNF
Fascist Podestà (1926–1943)
1	Ado Scaramucci	1926	1935	PNF
2	Ezio Saletti	1935	1937	PNF
3	Angelo Maestrini	1938	1943	PNF
Allied occupation (1944–1946)
12	Lio Lenzi	17 June 1944	27 March 1946	PCI

== Italian Republic (since 1946) ==
=== City Council election (1946–1993) ===
From 1946 to 1993, the Mayor of Grosseto was elected by the City Council.

	Mayor	Term start	Term end	Party
1	Lio Lenzi (1898–1960)	27 March 1946	29 July 1951	PCI
2	Renato Pollini (1925–2010)	29 July 1951	20 July 1970	PCI
3	Giovanni Battista Finetti (1940–1983)	20 July 1970	15 February 1982	PCI
4	Flavio Tattarini (b. 1943)	15 February 1982	23 January 1992	PCI
5	Loriano Valentini (b. 1950)	23 January 1992	22 June 1993	PDS

=== Direct election (since 1993) ===
Since 1993, under provisions of a new local administration law, the Mayor of Grosseto is chosen by direct election, originally every four, the every five years.

	Mayor	Took office	Left office	Party	Coalition	Election
(5)	Loriano Valentini (b. 1950)	22 June 1993	28 April 1997	PDS	PDS • PRI • FdV	1993
6	Alessandro Antichi (b. 1958)	28 April 1997	14 May 2001	FI	FI • AN • CCD • CDU	1997
6	Alessandro Antichi (b. 1958)	14 May 2001	16 May 2005 (Note: Resigned after being elected regional councillor. The deputy mayor Gabriele Bellettini (UDC) held the office till a new municipal election was held.)	FI	FI • AN • UDC	2001
7	Emilio Bonifazi (b. 1961)	31 May 2006	30 May 2011	PD	DS • DL • PRC • PdCI	2006
7	Emilio Bonifazi (b. 1961)	30 May 2011	23 June 2016	PD	PD • PSI • IdV • ApI	2011
8	Antonfrancesco Vivarelli Colonna (b. 1969)	23 June 2016	8 October 2021	Ind	FI • FdI • Lega	2016
8	Antonfrancesco Vivarelli Colonna (b. 1969)	8 October 2021 (Note: Election originally scheduled for June 2021 then postponed due to the COVID-19 pandemic.)	Incumbent	Ind	FI • FdI • Lega	2021

=== Timeline ===
==== By time in office ====
Rank	Mayor	Political Party	Total time in office	Terms
1	Renato Pollini	PCI	18 years, 343 days	4
2	Giovanni Battista Finetti	PCI	11 years, 210 days	3
3	Antonfrancesco Vivarelli Colonna	Ind/FI	10 years, 79 days	2
4	Emilio Bonifazi	PD	10 years, 24 days	2
5	Flavio Tattarini	PCI	8 years, 357 days	3
6	Alessandro Antichi	FI	8 years, 18 days	2
7	Loriano Valentini	PDS	5 years, 95 days	2
8	Lio Lenzi	PCI	4 years, 228 days	1

== Deputy Mayor ==
The office of the deputy mayor of Grosseto was officially created in 1993 with the adoption of the new local administration law. The deputy mayor is nominated and eventually dismissed by the mayor. Here is a list of deputy mayors of Grosseto:

	Deputy	Term start	Term end	Party	Mayor
1	Anna Maria Spada	23 June 1993	28 April 1997	Ind	Valentini
2	Andrea Agresti	7 May 1997	14 May 2001	AN	Antichi
2	Andrea Agresti	24 May 2001	4 April 2005 (Note: Resigned after his election in the Regional Council of Tuscany.)	AN	Antichi
3	Gabriele Bellettini	4 April 2005	31 May 2006	UDC	Antichi
4	Lucia Matergi	15 June 2006	17 May 2010 (Note: Resigned after her election in the Regional Council of Tuscany.)	PD	Bonifazi
5	Paolo Borghi	17 May 2010	30 May 2011	PD	Bonifazi
5	Paolo Borghi	11 June 2011	23 June 2016	PD	Bonifazi
6	Luca Agresti	27 June 2016	8 October 2021	FI	Vivarelli Colonna
7	Fabrizio Rossi	18 October 2021	21 February 2023 (Note: Resigned after his election in the Chamber of Deputies.)	FdI	Vivarelli Colonna
8	Bruno Ceccherini	21 February 2023	Incumbent	FdI	Vivarelli Colonna

== Bibliography ==
- Corsi, Hubert (1987). La lotta politica in Maremma 1900-1925. Rome: Edizioni Cinque Lune.
- Bonifazi, Emilio (2015). Grosseto e i suoi amministratori dal 1944 al 2015. Grosseto: Innocenti Editore.
- Giorgio Bonfiglioli, ed. (2017). Grosseto. Appunti storici. Grosseto: Innocenti Editore.
- Valeria Galimi, ed. (2018). Il fascismo a Grosseto. Figure e articolazioni del potere in provincia (1922-1938). Arcidosso: Edizioni Effigi.
