= Vincenzo Pasquali =

Italian sculptor

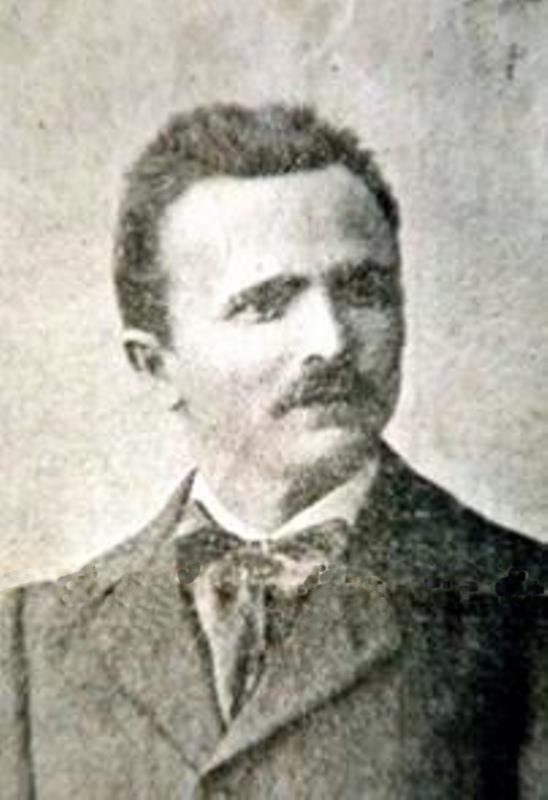
- Born: 25 June 1871; Scarlino, Gavorrano, Province of Grosseto, Kingdom of Italy
- Died: 15 May 1940 (aged 68); Sanremo, Province of Imperia, Kingdom of Italy
- Occupation: Sculptor

Vincenzo Pasquali (25 June 1871 – 25 June 1940) was an Italian sculptor, active mainly in his native Tuscany and in Liguria.

== Life and career ==
Born in Scarlino in 1871, the eldest of four brothers, he moved to Grosseto at a very young age, where he opened a workshop for sculpture, architecture, and ornamentation, along with his brothers Alfredo, Samuele, and Ferruccio. The Pasquali brothers' firm primarily received commissions for gravestones and funerary monuments, garden furnishings, as well as busts and public monuments. Some notable works include: medallions and funerary effigies for the Misericordia cemetery in Grosseto, where he also designed the Gothic-Revival Cappelli chapel; the Barberini chapel at the Scarlino cemetery; marble plaques with the profiles of Aurelio Saffi and Giuseppe Mazzini in Roccatederighi (1895); the monument to Felice Cavallotti (lost) in Grosseto (1899); and the marble and travertine sculptural complex dedicated to Giuseppe Garibaldi in Scarlino (1900).

He later opened the Pasquali Foundry in Pistoia, and national-level commissions increased. Examples include the bronze doors of the Triumph of Caesar over the Barbarians, also exhibited in Munich, and the Meregaglia chapel in the Turin cemetery. In Genoa, he created the equestrian statue of Saint George at the International Exhibition and the statues of Domoculta and Caffaro in the Palazzo Bianco.

In 1915, he settled permanently in Sanremo, where he opened a sculpture studio and gallery, and became the city's official sculptor. Among his Ligurian works are: the statue of Primavera, one of the city's symbols; the statue of Saint Francis at the Capuchin church; the statue of Ondina in Rigolè Square; the bronze monument to the fallen on Corso Mombello, inaugurated on 12 November 1923, by King Victor Emmanuel III. In 1924, he designed the World War I memorials in Dego, Taggia, and Spotorno.

Pasquali was the author of the Italian war memorial in Lyon, inaugurated on 24 May 1925.

He was a member of the Freemasonry. He died on 15 May 1940, and was buried in the Foce cemetery in Sanremo.

== Sources ==
- Mariagrazia Celuzza; Mauro Papa, eds. (2013). Grosseto visibile. Guida alla città e alla sua arte pubblica. Arcidosso: Edizioni Effigi.
- Enrico Crispolti; Anna Mazzanti; Luca Quattrocchi, eds. (2006). Arte in Maremma nella prima metà del Novecento. Milan: Silvana Editoriale.
- Emanuela Duretto; Maurizia Migliorini; Maria Teresa Verda Scajola (1986). Sanremo tra due secoli. Arte e architettura di una "ville de saison" tra '800 e '900. Genoa: Sagep.
