= 2010 Tuscan regional election =

Election

← 2005	28–29 March 2010	2015 →

All 53 seats to the Regional Council
- Turnout: 60.7% (▼10.6%)
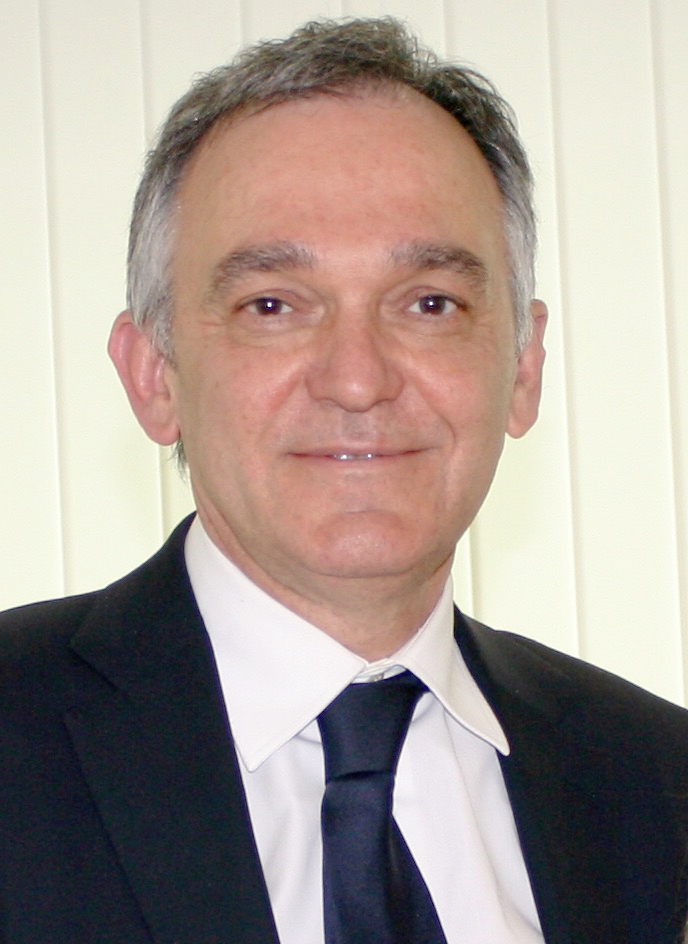

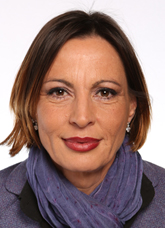
	Majority party	Minority party
Leader	Enrico Rossi	Monica Faenzi
Party	Democratic Party	People of Freedom
Alliance	Centre-left	Centre-right
Last election	39 seats, 57.3%	21 seats, 32.8%
Seats won	32	19
Seat change	▼7	▼2
Popular vote	1,055,751	608,680
Percentage	59.7%	34.4%
Swing	▲3.4%	▲1.6%
President before election
Claudio Martini
Democratic Party
Elected President
Enrico Rossi
Democratic Party

The Tuscan regional election of 2010 took place on 28–29 March 2010.

After two consecutive terms, President Claudio Martini of the Democratic Party chose not run for a third term. His successor, Enrico Rossi, was defeated in a landslide his centre-right opponent Monica Faenzi. The Democrats were by far the largest party, although they lost ground from previous elections.

Minor candidates included Francesco Bosi for the Union of the Centre, Alfonso De Virgilis for the Italian Radicals and Ilario Palmisani for New Force.

== Electoral system ==
Tuscany uses its own legislation of 2004 to elect its Council. The councillors are elected in provincial constituencies by proportional representation using the largest remainder method with a Droop quota and close lists.

In this system parties are grouped in alliances, and the alliance which receives a plurality of votes elects all its candidates, its leader becoming the President of Tuscany.

== Council apportionment ==
According to the official 2001 Italian census, the 33 Council seats which must be covered by proportional representation are so distributed between Tuscan provinces; the highest number of candidates in each list by province is this:

AR	FI	GR	LI	LU	MS	PI	PT	PO	SI
6	17	4	6	7	3	7	5	4	4

The allocation is fixed. Remaining seats and votes after nominal distribution, are all grouped at regional level and divided by party lists. The consequent division of these seats at provincial level usually change the original apportionment.

== Parties and candidates ==
Political party or alliance	Constituent lists	Previous result		Candidate
Political party or alliance	Constituent lists	Votes (%)	Seats	Candidate
Centre-left coalition	Democratic Party	48.8	33	Enrico Rossi
Centre-left coalition	Federation of the Left – Greens	15.2	9	Enrico Rossi
Centre-left coalition	Italy of Values	0.9	–	Enrico Rossi
Centre-left coalition	Left Ecology Freedom	—	—	Enrico Rossi
Centre-right coalition	The People of Freedom	28.1	17	Monica Faenzi
Centre-right coalition	Northern League Tuscany	1.3	–	Monica Faenzi
Union of the Centre		3.7	3	Francesco Bosi

== Results ==
The election was won by President Enrico Rossi of the Democratic Party, supported by the center-left coalition.

Lega Nord Toscana won three seats, its best performance in party history to that point.

The Democratic Party was confirmed as the largest party in the region with 42% of the vote, although with a decline of six points, while The People of Freedom took 27%. The election was the only one other than the 2005 election in which the center-left coalition improved its performance.

28–29 March 2010 Tuscan regional election results
Candidates	Votes	%	Seats	Parties	Votes	%	Seats
Enrico Rossi	1,055,751	59.73	1				
Enrico Rossi	1,055,751	59.73	1	Democratic Party	641,214	42.20	23
Enrico Rossi	1,055,751	59.73	1	Italy of Values	143,194	9.42	5
Enrico Rossi	1,055,751	59.73	1	Federation of the Left – Greens	80,017	5.27	3
Enrico Rossi	1,055,751	59.73	1	Left Ecology Freedom	57,815	3.81	–
Enrico Rossi	1,055,751	59.73	1	Total	922,240	60.70	32
Monica Faenzi	608,680	34.44	1				
Monica Faenzi	608,680	34.44	1	The People of Freedom	412,118	27.12	15
Monica Faenzi	608,680	34.44	1	Northern League Tuscany	98,523	6.48	3
Monica Faenzi	608,680	34.44	1	Total	510,641	33.69	19
Francesco Bosi	81,106	4.59	1	Union of the Centre	72,548	4.77	1
Alfonso De Virgiliis	13,892	0.79	–	Bonino-Pannella List	8,414	0.55	–
Ilario Palmisani	7,980	0.45	–	New Force	5,588	0.37	–
Total candidates	1,767,409	100.00	3	Total parties	1,519,431	100.00	50
Source: Ministry of the Interior – Historical Archive of Elections

== See also ==
- 2010 Italian local elections
