= 1946 Italian local elections =

The 1946 Italian local elections were the first after the fall of fascism in Italy, leading to the re-establishment of all municipal administrations, after the municipalities had been run by mayors and temporary councils appointed by the AMGOT in the South and by the CLN in the North. Voters were able to elect the city councils of 5,722 municipalities for the first time since 1926.

The first turn of municipal elections was held on 10 March (436 municipalities), 17 March (1,033 municipalities), 24 March (1,469 municipalities), 31 March (1,560 municipalities) and 7 April (1,139 municipalities). The second turn of elections was held on 6 October (272 municipalities), 13 October, 20 October (286 municipalities), 27 October (188 municipalities), 3 November, 10 November, 17 November and 24 November.

The municipal elections of 10 March were the first in which women could vote and be able to stand as candidates.

== Electoral system ==
The electoral law enacted by Legislative Decree No. 1 of 1946 established a proportional representation system based on the D'Hondt method for municipalities with more than 30,000 inhabitants, while providing for a multi-member majoritarian system with limited voting — restricted to four-fifths of the seats — for all others.

== Results of the first turn of elections ==
=== Municipal elections of 10 March ===
Results summary of 434 municipalities.

| Party | seats | municipalities |
|---|---|---|
| Christian Democracy (DC) | 178 | |
| Socialists and Communists | 125 | |
| Independents | 79 | |
| Labour Democratic Party (PDL) | 11 | |
| Italian Liberal Party (PLI) | 19 | |
| Concentration of the right | 10 | |
| Italian Republican Party (PRI) | 8 | |
| Common Man's Front (FUQ) | 3 | |
| Action Party (PdA) | 1 | |
| Total | | |

=== Municipal elections of 17 March ===
Results summary of 1,008 municipalities.

| Party | seats | municipalities |
|---|---|---|
| Concentration of the left | 6,155 | 350 |
| Christian Democracy (DC) | 6,028 | 329 |
| Independents | 1,690 | 90 |
| Concentration of the centre | 1,333 | 67 |
| Concentration of the right | 645 | 44 |
| Local parties | 490 | 28 |
| Italian Socialist Party of Proletarian Unity (PSIUP) | 443 | 22 |
| Italian Communist Party (PCI) | 425 | 18 |
| Labour Democratic Party (PDL) | 376 | 25 |
| Italian Liberal Party (PLI) | 312 | 14 |
| Combatants and Veterans | 233 | 13 |
| Italian Republican Party (PRI) | 196 | 8 |
| Common Man's Front (FUQ) | 126 | 7 |
| Action Party (PdA) | 66 | 1 |
| Italian Democracy | 33 | 2 |
| Total | 18,563 | 1,008 |

=== Municipal elections of 24 March ===
Results summary of 1,459 municipalities.

| Party | seats | municipalities |
|---|---|---|
| Christian Democracy (DC) | 9,808 | 539 |
| Concentration of the left | 9,515 | 536 |
| Independents | 1,928 | 97 |
| Concentration of the centre | 1,398 | 66 |
| Italian Socialist Party of Proletarian Unity (PSIUP) | 987 | 34 |
| Italian Communist Party (PCI) | 802 | 39 |
| Local parties | 682 | 43 |
| Concentration of the right | 574 | 30 |
| Italian Liberal Party (PLI) | 481 | 27 |
| Labour Democratic Party (PDL) | 338 | 17 |
| Italian Republican Party (PRI) | 247 | 12 |
| Common Man's Front (FUQ) | 126 | 7 |
| Combatants and Veterans | 196 | 7 |
| Action Party (PdA) | 89 | 4 |
| Italian Democracy | 14 | 1 |
| Total | 27,185 | 1,459 |

In 7 municipalities there was no prevalence of any party.

=== Municipal elections of 31 March ===
Results summary of 1,505 municipalities.

| Party | seats | municipalities |
|---|---|---|
| Christian Democracy (DC) | 10,158 | 575 |
| Concentration of the left | 9,336 | 507 |
| Independents | 2,238 | 125 |
| Concentration of the centre | 1,363 | 70 |
| Italian Socialist Party of Proletarian Unity (PSIUP) | 1,102 | 42 |
| Italian Communist Party (PCI) | 1,099 | 55 |
| Local parties | 818 | 50 |
| Italian Liberal Party (PLI) | 434 | 22 |
| Concentration of the right | 346 | 13 |
| Labour Democratic Party (PDL) | 321 | 16 |
| Combatants and Veterans | 282 | 18 |
| Italian Republican Party (PRI) | 205 | 8 |
| Common Man's Front (FUQ) | 90 | 3 |
| Action Party (PdA) | 35 | - |
| Italian Democracy | 18 | 1 |
| Total | | |

=== Municipal elections of 7 April ===
Results summary of 1,141 municipalities.

| Party | seats | municipalities |
|---|---|---|
| Concentration of the left | 7,997 | 450 |
| Christian Democracy (DC) | 7,095 | 376 |
| Independents | 1,684 | 93 |
| Concentration of the centre | 883 | 46 |
| Concentration of the right | 758 | 38 |
| Italian Socialist Party of Proletarian Unity (PSIUP) | 747 | 34 |
| Local parties | 723 | 41 |
| Italian Communist Party (PCI) | 560 | 24 |
| Italian Liberal Party (PLI) | 260 | 10 |
| Combatants and Veterans | 184 | 7 |
| Labour Democratic Party (PDL) | 181 | 9 |
| Italian Republican Party (PRI) | 171 | 5 |
| Common Man's Front (FUQ) | 55 | 1 |
| Action Party (PdA) | 40 | 1 |
| Italian Democracy | 12 | 1 |
| Total | | |

In 5 municipalities there was no prevalence of any party.
