= Frasso Sabino =

- Comune
- Comune di Frasso Sabino
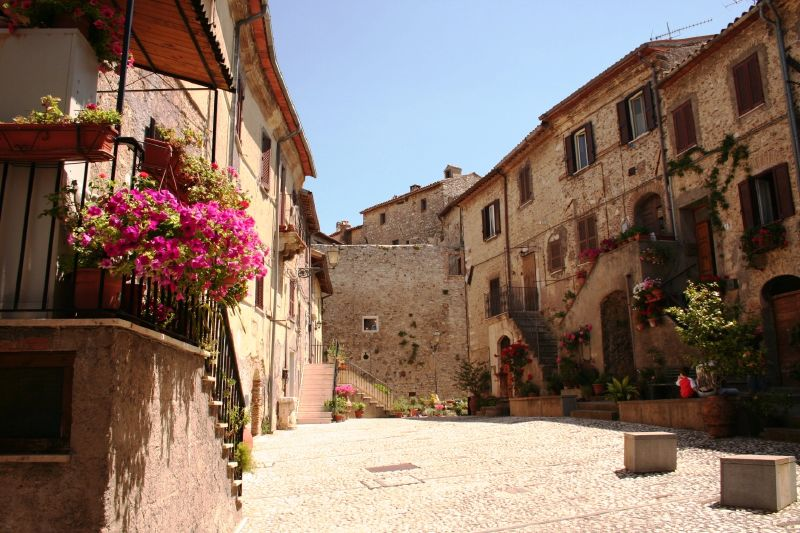
- View of Frasso Sabino

- Coat of arms

- Location within Italy Location within Lazio
- Coordinates: 42°14′N 12°48′E
- Country: Italy
- Region: Lazio
- Province: Rieti (RI)

Government
  - Mayor: Antonio Statuti

Area
  - Total: 4.39 km^{2} (1.69 sq mi)
- Elevation: 412 m (1,352 ft)

Population (31 August 2017)
  - Total: 745
  - Density: 170/km^{2} (440/sq mi)
- Demonym: Frassaroli
- Time zone: UTC+1 (CET)
  - Summer (DST): UTC+2 (CEST)
- Postal code: 02030
- Dialing code: 0765
- Website: Official website

Frasso Sabino (Sabino: U Frassu) is a comune (municipality) in the Province of Rieti in the Italian region of Latium, located about 45 kilometres (28 mi) northeast of Rome and about 20 kilometres (12 mi) southwest of Rieti.
