= Monica Faenzi =

Italian politician

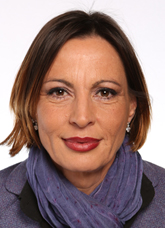

Member of the Chamber of Deputies
- In office 29 April 2008 – 22 March 2018

Mayor of Castiglione della Pescaia
- In office 14 May 2001 – 17 May 2011
- Preceded by: Franco Roggiolani
- Succeeded by: Giancarlo Farnetani

Personal details
- Born: 21 May 1965 (age 61) Grosseto, Italy
- Party: Forza Italia

Monica Faenzi (born 21 May 1965) is an Italian politician who was mayor of Castiglione della Pescaia from 2001 to 2011 and deputy for two legislatures (2008–2013, 2013–2018). She has been described as the "Tuscan Berlusconi".

Faenzi announced in February 2026 that she intended to leave politics.
