= Giuseppe Chiaravalloti =

Italian politician and judge (1934–2025)

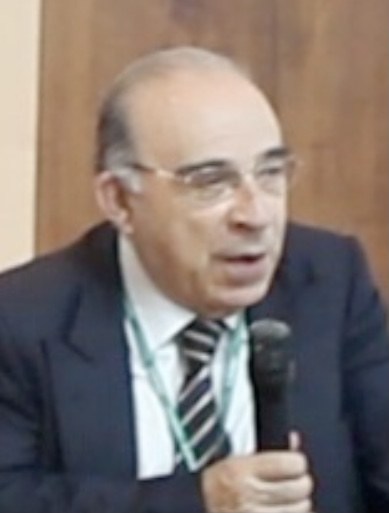
- Chiaravalloti in 2012

President of Calabria
- In office 18 May 2000 – 2 May 2005
- Preceded by: Luigi Meduri
- Succeeded by: Agazio Loiero

Personal details
- Born: 26 February 1934 Satriano, Italy
- Died: 6 January 2025 (aged 90) Catanzaro, Italy
- Party: Forza Italia
- Education: University of Genoa
- Occupation: Judge, politician

Giuseppe Chiaravalloti (26 February 1934 – 6 January 2025) was an Italian judge and politician, President of Calabria.

== Life and career ==
Born in Satriano, in province of Catanzaro, Chiaravalloti graduated in Law at the University of Genoa where, for a short time, he had as a classmate the future actor and screenwriter Paolo Villaggio.

=== Judge career ===
Chiaravalloti entered the magistracy in 1959 and was assigned to the district court of Crotone, being appointed a titular judge from 1964 to 1976 when he became an attorney in Catanzaro.

In 1991, Chiaravalloti was assigned to the General Attorney of the Appellate court of Catanzaro, while from July 1997 to April 2000 he has been attorney general at the Appellate court of Reggio Calabria.

After his experience as governor, Chiaravalloti was commissioner and vice-president of the Authority for the protection of personal data from 2005 to 2012.

=== Political career ===
Chiaravalloti became the official candidate of the House of Freedoms for the office of President of Calabria at the 2000 regional election and won, holding his seat for the following five years.

=== Judicial proceedings ===
Together with his successor Agazio Loiero, Chiaravalloti was involved in the Why Not investigation, then led by judge Luigi de Magistris, created to shed light on alleged wrongdoing in the management of public funds for the development of Calabria. Chiaravalloti was charged for the crime of abuse of office but in 2013 he was absolved definitively by the Court of Cassation for not having committed the fact.

== Death ==
Chiaravalloti died on 6 January 2025, at the age of 90.
