= Fabrizio Mattei =

Italian politician (born 1952)

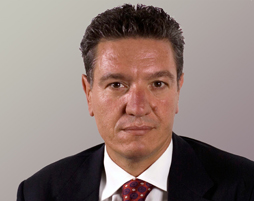

Mayor of Prato
- In office 24 April 1995 – 14 June 2004
- Preceded by: Claudio Martini
- Succeeded by: Marco Romagnoli

Member of the Regional Council of Tuscany
- In office 27 April 2005 – 17 June 2015

Personal details
- Born: 7 January 1952 (age 74) Prato, Province of Florence, Italy
- Party: Italian Communist Party (until 1991); Democratic Party of the Left (1991–1998); Democrats of the Left (1998–2007); Democratic Party (Italy) (from 2007)

Fabrizio Mattei (born 7 January 1952) is an Italian politician who served as mayor of Prato (1995–2004) and as a member of the Regional Council of Tuscany (2005–2015).

== Life and career ==
Born in Prato in 1952, Mattei became involved in student activism before joining the Italian Communist Party at a young age. He later followed the party's evolution into the Democratic Party of the Left and then the Democrats of the Left.

He began his political career at local level, serving as assessor for urban planning and deputy mayor of Prato in the administration led by Claudio Martini. He was elected mayor of Prato in 1995, serving for two terms until 2004.

After leaving municipal office, he was elected to the Regional Council of Tuscany in 2005 for the centre-left coalition Uniti nell'Ulivo, representing the constituency of Prato. During his regional mandate he held roles in several committees, including those dealing with economic development and institutional reforms, and later chaired the committee on electoral legislation. He also served as vice-chair of his political group.

Re-elected in 2010 for the Democratic Party, he chaired the regional commission on mobility and infrastructure.
