= Agazio Loiero =

Italian politician (born 1940)

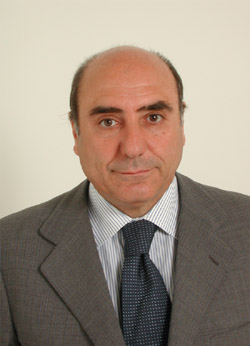

President of Calabria
- In office 2 May 2005 – 12 April 2010
- Preceded by: Giuseppe Chiaravalloti
- Succeeded by: Giuseppe Scopelliti

Minister for Parliamentary Relations
- In office 22 December 1999 – 25 April 2000
- Prime Minister: Massimo D'Alema
- Preceded by: Gian Guido Folloni
- Succeeded by: Patrizia Toia

Minister for Regional Affairs
- In office 25 April 2000 – 11 June 2001
- Prime Minister: Giuliano Amato
- Preceded by: Katia Bellillo
- Succeeded by: Enrico La Loggia

Member of the Chamber of Deputies
- In office 2 July 1987 – 14 April 1994
- In office 30 May 2001 – 26 April 2005
- Constituency: Catanzaro

Member of the Senate of the Republic
- In office 9 May 1996 – 30 May 2001
- Constituency: Calabria

Personal details
- Born: 14 January 1940 (age 86) Santa Severina, Italy
- Party: DC (till 1994); PPI (1994–1996); CCD (1996–1998); UDR (1998–1999); UDEUR (1999–2002); DL (2002–2007); PD (2007–2011); MpA (2011–2013)
- Education: University of Calabria
- Occupation: Politician, editorial consultant

Agazio Loiero (born 14 January 1940) is an Italian politician. He is a former president of Calabria and minister in the second D'Alema government and the second Amato government.

== Early life and education ==
Loiero was born in Santa Severina, in the Calabria region. He graduated in Letters and Philosophy at the University of Calabria. Loiero worked as a columnist for several newspapers, such as Il Messaggero, L'Unità, and the Gazzetta del Sud.

=== Political career ===
Loiero joined Christian Democracy (DC), with which he was elected city councilor in Catanzaro. From 1987 to 1994, Loiero was elected to the country's Chamber of Deputies with the DC; he tried to be re-elected in 1994 with the Pact for Italy but failed the election.

In 1996, Loiero joined the Christian Democratic Centre led by Pier Ferdinando Casini and was re-elected to the Senate of the Republic. In 1998, Loiero left the Pole for Freedoms, the Silvio Berlusconi-led centre-right coalition, and joined the Union of Democrats for Europe, being later appointed Minister for Parliamentary Relations and Minister for Regional Affairs in the respective second governments headed by Massimo D'Alema and Giuliano Amato, respectively.

In 2001, Loiero returned to the Chamber of Deputies, leaving his seat in the Italian Parliament when in the 2005 Calabrian regional election is elected president of the region. Loiero fails to be re-elected governor in the 2010 regional election. In 2007, Loiero joined the National Leadership of the Democratic Party (PD), giving his support to Rosy Bindi during the 2007 leadership election. Loiero left the party in 2011, after having been very critical to secretary Pier Luigi Bersani, and joined the Movement for the Autonomies (MpA). He left the MpA in 2013 when it made an electoral agreement with the centre-right coalition.

=== Judicial proceedings ===
Together with his predecessor Giuseppe Chiaravalloti, Loiero has been involved in the Why Not investigation, then led by judge Luigi de Magistris, created to shed light on alleged wrongdoing in the management of public funds for the development of Calabria. Loiero was charged for the crime of abuse of office; in 2013, he was absolved definitively by Italy's Supreme Court of Cassation for not having committed the fact.
