= Antonfrancesco Vivarelli Colonna =

Italian politician

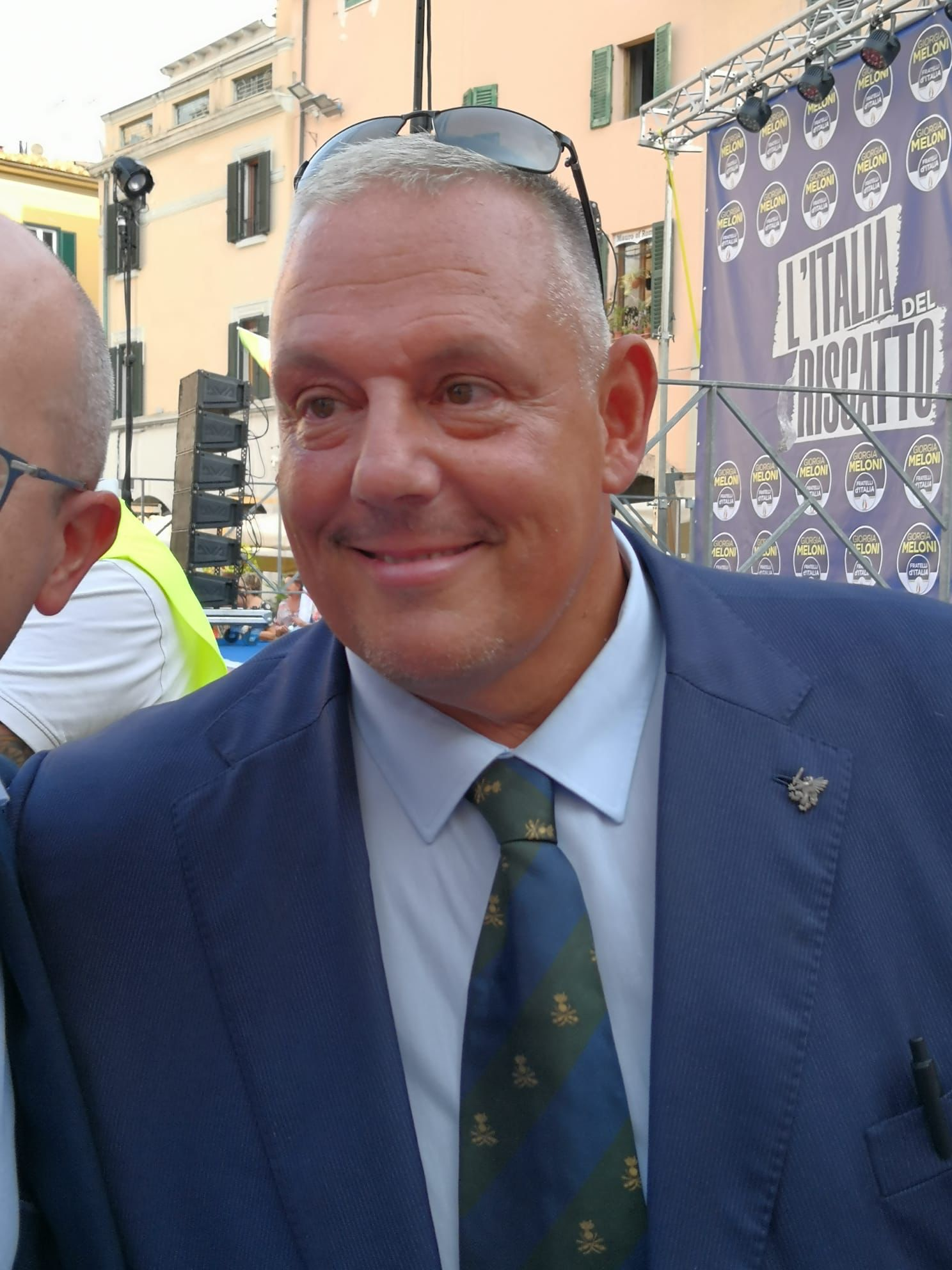

Mayor of Grosseto
- Incumbent
- Assumed office 23 June 2016
- Preceded by: Emilio Bonifazi

President of the Province of Grosseto
- In office 9 January 2017 – 19 December 2021
- Preceded by: Emilio Bonifazi
- Succeeded by: Francesco Limatola

Personal details
- Born: 24 November 1969 (age 56) Florence, Italy
- Party: Forza Italia (since 2025)
- Other political affiliations: Centre-right independent (2016-2025)
- Profession: Entrepreneur

Antonfrancesco Vivarelli Colonna (born 23 November 1969) is an Italian politician.

He currently serves as mayor of Grosseto and was president of the Province of Grosseto from 2017 until 2021.

== Biography ==
Born in Florence, he attended the Naval Academy of Livorno. He graduated as an English and German interpreter at the High School for interpreters and translators in Pisa and started his career as a professional translator and interpreter. Later he became official of the regiment "Piemonte Cavalleria 2º" of Trieste, obtaining the rank of lieutenant.

He took his leave in 1998 and moved to Maremma, where he started to administer the estate and the agricultural business of his family in Orbetello and Grosseto. Vivarelli Colonna held important positions in trade union associations dedicated to safeguarding agriculture, food and livestock. He served as president of "Confartigianato Grosseto" from 2011 to 2016.

He ran for Mayor of Grosseto as an independent at the 2016 Italian local elections, supported by a centre-right coalition formed by Lega Nord, Forza Italia, Brothers of Italy and the civic list "Maremma Migliore". He was elected Mayor of Grosseto on 19 June 2016 and took office on 23 June.

He was elected President of the Province of Grosseto on 8 January 2017.

== See also ==
- 2016 Italian local elections
- List of mayors of Grosseto

Political offices
Preceded by Emilio Bonifazi	President of the Province of Grosseto; 2017–2021	Succeeded by Francesco Limatola
Preceded by Emilio Bonifazi	Mayor of Grosseto since 2016	Succeeded by incumbent
