= Paolo Marcheschi =

Italian politician (born 1961)

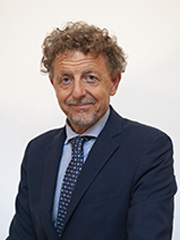
- Marcheschi in 2022

Member of the Senate
- Incumbent
- Assumed office 13 October 2022
- Constituency: Tuscany – P01

Member of the Regional Council of Tuscany
- In office 4 July 2001 – 17 June 2015
- In office 11 April 2018 – 8 October 2020

Personal details
- Born: 23 March 1961 (age 65) Florence, Italy
- Party: Brothers of Italy (since 2012)

Paolo Marcheschi (born 23 March 1961) is an Italian politician serving as a member of the Senate since 2022. He was a member of the Regional Council of Tuscany from 2001 to 2015 and from 2018 to 2020.

== Biography ==
After earning a law degree from the University of Florence, he began a career as an insurance agent and entrepreneur.

A member of Forza Italia (1994) since its founding, he was elected to the Province of Florence Council in 1995 and re-elected in 1999, and has served as the party’s provincial coordinator since 1997.

He ran in the 2000 Tuscan regional elections in the Florence district and finished first among the unelected candidates, taking Denis Verdini seat on the Regional Council on July 4, 2001. He was re-elected to the Regional Council in 2005 and 2010 as well. From June 2009 to May 2010, he also served as a city councilor in Scandicci. From 2010 to 2012, he served as the provincial secretary in Florence for the People of Freedom party; in December 2012, he participated in the split of the People of Freedom party led by Giorgia Meloni, Ignazio La Russa, and Guido Crosetto, which led to the founding of Brothers of Italy, becoming vice president and treasurer of the council group.

In the 2022 general election, he was elected to the Senate as a member of Fratelli d'Italia in the multi-member constituency of Tuscany. As the FdI group leader, he serves on the 7th Committee on Culture and Cultural Heritage, Public Education, Scientific Research, Entertainment, and Sports.

He is also chair of the Oversight Committee, chair of the Waste Management Committee, and vice chair of the Environment and Transportation Committee.
