= Francesco Bosi =

Italian politician (1945–2021)

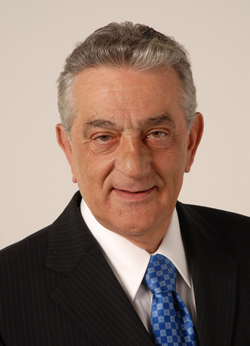

Member of the Regional Council of Tuscany
- In office 9 May 1990 – 24 April 1995

Member of the Senate of the Republic
- In office 9 May 1996 – 27 April 2006

Member of the Chamber of Deputies
- In office 28 April 2006 – 14 March 2013

Mayor of Rio Marina
- In office 14 May 2001 – 16 May 2011
- Preceded by: Giuseppe Pesce
- Succeeded by: Paola Mancuso

Undersecretary of State for the Defence
- In office 11 June 2001 – 17 May 2006
- President: Silvio Berlusconi

Personal details
- Born: 7 April 1945; Piacenza, Kingdom of Italy
- Died: 4 July 2021 (aged 76); Florence, Tuscany, Italy

Francesco Bosi (7 April 1945 – 4 July 2021) was an Italian politician who served as a Senator.
