= Alessandro Antichi =

Italian politician and lawyer (born 1958)

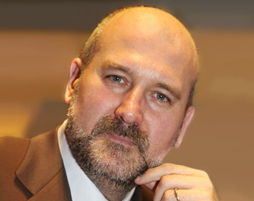

Mayor of Grosseto
- In office 28 April 1997 – 16 May 2005
- Preceded by: Loriano Valentini
- Succeeded by: Emilio Bonifazi

Member of the Regional Council of Tuscany
- In office 27 April 2005 – 17 June 2015

Personal details
- Born: 14 May 1958 (age 68) Grosseto, Italy
- Party: Forza Italia (1995-2009); The People of Freedom (2009-2013)
- Education: University of Siena
- Profession: lawyer

Alessandro Antichi (born 14 May 1958) is an Italian politician and lawyer.

== Life and career ==
Graduated at the University of Siena in 1982, he opened his own law firm in the city of Grosseto in 1985. He joined the centre-right party Forza Italia in 1995 and was elected Mayor of Grosseto on 28 April 1997. Antichi was the first centre-right politician to be elected mayor of the city.

He was re-elected for a second term on 14 May 2001. Antichi resigned three years later in order to run for the office of President of Tuscany at the 2005 Tuscan regional election, but he was ultimately defeated by the centre-left candidate Claudio Martini.

He served as member of the Regional Council of Tuscany from 2005 to 2015.

He ran for the office of President of the Province of Grosseto at the 2009 elections, but lost to Leonardo Marras.

== See also ==
- 2005 Italian regional elections
- List of mayors of Grosseto

== Bibliography ==
- Bonifazi, Emilio (2015). Grosseto e i suoi amministratori dal 1944 al 2015. Grosseto.

Political offices
| Preceded by Loriano Valentini | Mayor of Grosseto; 1997–2005 | Succeeded by Emilio Bonifazi |
