= 2005 Tuscan regional election =

← 2000	3–4 April 2005	2010 →

All 65 seats to the Regional Council
- Turnout: 71.3% (▼3.3%)
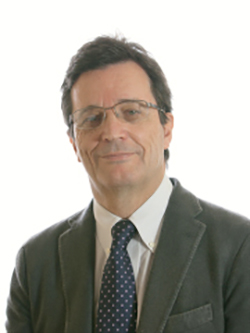

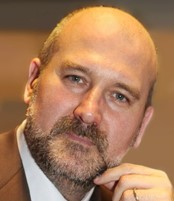
	Majority party	Minority party
Leader	Claudio Martini	Alessandro Antichi
Party	DS	Forza Italia
Alliance	The Union	House of Freedoms
Last election	32 seats, 49.3%	16 seats, 40.0%
Seats won	39	21
Seat change	▲7	▲5
Popular vote	1,185,374	678,491
Percentage	57.4%	32.8%
Swing	▲8.1%	▼1.6%
President before election
Claudio Martini
DS
Elected President
Claudio Martini
DS

The Tuscan regional election of 2005 took place on 3–4 April 2005.

Incumbent Claudio Martini (Democrats of the Left) defeated Alessandro Antichi (Forza Italia) by a landslide.

== Electoral system ==
Tuscany uses its own legislation of 2004 to elect its Council. The councillors are elected in provincial constituencies by proportional representation using the largest remainder method with a Droop quota and close lists.

In this system parties are grouped in alliances, and the alliance which receives a plurality of votes elects all its candidates, its leader becoming the President of Tuscany.

In 2005 the number of the regional councilors rose to 65 from 50.

== Parties and candidates ==
Political party or alliance	Constituent lists	Previous result		Candidate
Political party or alliance	Constituent lists	Votes (%)	Seats	Candidate
The Union	The Olive Tree	45.0	20	Claudio Martini
The Union	Party of Italian Communists	3.0	1	Claudio Martini
The Union	Federation of the Greens	2.2	1	Claudio Martini
The Union	Italy of Values	—	—	Claudio Martini
House of Freedoms	Forza Italia	20.2	8	Alessandro Antichi
House of Freedoms	National Alliance	14.9	5	Alessandro Antichi
House of Freedoms	Union of Christian and Centre Democrats	4.1	2	Alessandro Antichi
House of Freedoms	Northern League Tuscany	0.6	–	Alessandro Antichi
Communist Refoundation Party		6.7	2	Luca Ciabatti

== Results ==
2005 election led to the return to the guide of the Region, for its second consecutive term, Claudio Martini, supported by the center-left coalition.

If the mechanisms of electoral law generated a Regional Council very similar to the incumbent one, popular vote marked a significant increase in the gap between the two sides, which was almost halved. The same plurality party, Democrats of the Left in coalition with other parties in The Olive Tree, increased of more than one hundred thousand preferences. The election was also the test for a list that led, within two years, to the national foundation of a new political entity, the Democratic Party.

Like 1995 election, Communist Refoundation Party run lonely with its candidate.

3–4 April 2005 Tuscan regional election results
Candidates	Votes	%	Seats	Parties	Votes	%	Seats
Claudio Martini	1,185,374	57.37	1				
Claudio Martini	1,185,374	57.37	1	The Olive Tree	880,876	48.77	33
Claudio Martini	1,185,374	57.37	1	Party of Italian Communists	77,126	4.27	3
Claudio Martini	1,185,374	57.37	1	Federation of the Greens	50,235	2.78	2
Claudio Martini	1,185,374	57.37	1	Italy of Values	15,869	0.88	–
Claudio Martini	1,185,374	57.37	1	Total	1,024,106	56.70	38
Alessandro Antichi	678,491	32.84	1				
Alessandro Antichi	678,491	32.84	1	Forza Italia	310,427	17.19	10
Alessandro Antichi	678,491	32.84	1	National Alliance	196,478	10.88	7
Alessandro Antichi	678,491	32.84	1	Union of Christian and Centre Democrats	66,186	3.66	3
Alessandro Antichi	678,491	32.84	1	Northern League Tuscany	22,884	1.27	–
Alessandro Antichi	678,491	32.84	1	Total	595,975	33.00	20
Luca Ciabatti	151,560	7.33	1	Communist Refoundation Party	148,103	8.20	4
Renzo Macelloni	30,062	1.45	–	Socialists and Laics (incl. New PSI, PRI, PLI)	23,379	1.29	–
Mario Gozzoli	20,845	1.01	–	Social Alternative	14,651	0.81	–
Total candidates	2,066,332	100.00	3	Total parties	1,806,214	100.00	62
Source: Ministry of the Interior – Historical Archive of Elections

== See also ==
- 2005 Italian regional elections
