= Enrico Rossi (politician) =

Italian politician and former President of Tuscany

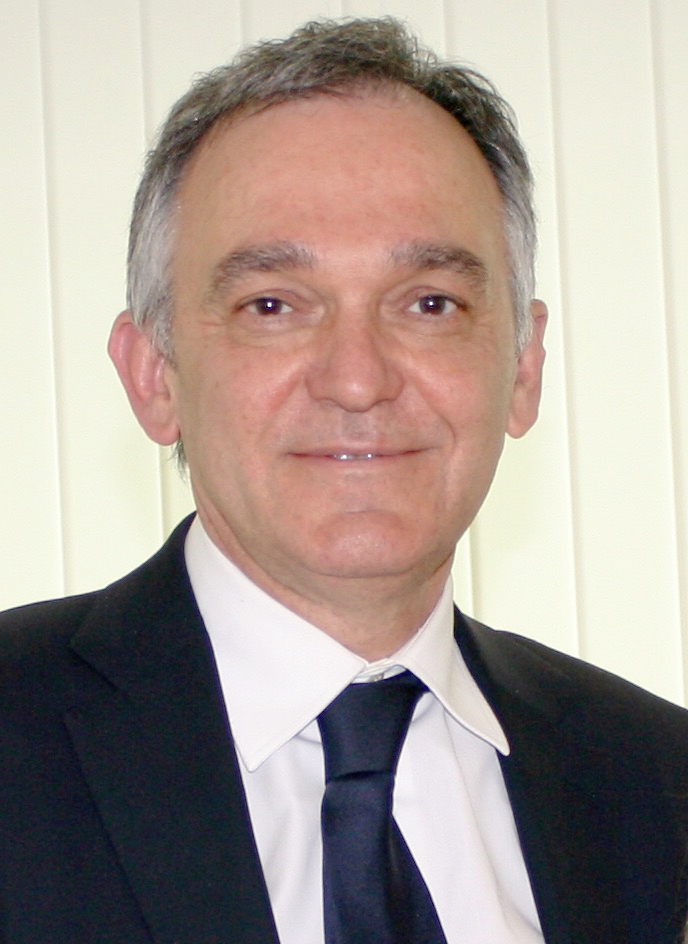

President of Tuscany
- In office 16 April 2010 – 8 October 2020
- Preceded by: Claudio Martini
- Succeeded by: Eugenio Giani

Regional assessor to Healthcare of Tuscany
- In office 18 May 2000 – 16 April 2010
- President: Claudio Martini

Member of the Regional Council of Tuscany
- In office 2 May 2000 – 5 April 2005

Mayor of Pontedera
- In office 16 July 1990 – 14 June 1999
- Preceded by: Carletto Monni
- Succeeded by: Paolo Marconcini

Personal details
- Born: 25 August 1958 (age 68) Bientina, Pisa, Italy
- Party: PCI (1985–1991); PDS (1991–1998); DS (1998–2007); PD (2007–2017; since 2019); MDP (2017–2019)
- Education: University of Pisa
- Profession: Journalist

Enrico Rossi (born 25 August 1958) is an Italian politician and former President of Tuscany.

== Early life ==
He was born into a working-class family in 1958, and in 1982 he graduated with a degree in philosophy, with a thesis on the Hungarian philosopher Ágnes Heller. During his time at university, he was part of the student movement and worked as a journalist. In 1985, he joined the Italian Communist Party.

== Mayor of Pontedera and Regional Assessor of Health ==
From 1985 to 1990, he was a member of the City Council of Pontedera (an industrial town with a large Piaggio-Vespa factory), serving as Vice Mayor and Councillor for Social Policy and Urban Planning. Later, he became Mayor of the same city, holding the office for nine years, from 1990 to 1999. During his second term, Rossi fought against the move of the Piaggio from Pontedera to Nusco.

In 2000, Enrico Rossi was elected as a Member of the Regional Council of Tuscany, and for ten years he was Regional Assessor for Healthcare. Under his leadership, the regional public health services reached a high level of quality, with modern facilities and technologies, becoming the first in Italy to receive the quality label "Essential Levels of Care" (LEA). Merit, evaluation and research were the cornerstones of his policies.

== President of Tuscany ==
After being one of the founders of the Democratic Party in 2007, Enrico Rossi was elected as President of Tuscany in 2010 with a majority of about 60% of voters, leading a centre-left coalition. He ran again for the Presidency in 2015 and was then reelected. Since 2010, he is regularly among the top-3 most appreciated presidents of Italian regions, according to surveys run by Il Sole 24 Ore economic newspaper.

=== Giovanisì ===
In June 2011, Rossi launched Giovanisì. The program, cost €400 million and advantaged 100,000 youngs, comprised right to education, help to vocational education, civil service, credits to specialization studies and contribution to pay the rent.

From June 2011 to February 2014, there were 14,251 internships, 5,637 announcement for houses accepted, 4,000 projects to civil service, 1,500 young business financed, 80,000 benefits of scholarships. The European Commissioner László Andor acclaimed Rossi's program, based on a similar European project.

=== Solidary Tuscany ===
The program Solidary Tuscany ("Toscana Solidale") was created for a war on poverty, to support the poorer families and workers. The program includes a baby bonus of €700 for infants, €700 for disabled children, €700 annually for numerous families, and €3,000 of credit for occasional workers.

=== Spending review ===
Enrico Rossi launched a cut in public spending. Since 2011, he has earned the lowest pay among the Presidents of Region in Italy, like his assessors and the regional councillors. In May 2012, he sold off the "blue cars" (free public car of the Italian politicians) in favour of methane-powered Fiat Puntos. Regional officeholders travel in second class with trains, on budget airlines and from 2009 the spending of the Rossi Administration and staff was reduced of 60%. In 2011, the number of regional councillors decreased from 65 to 55 and the assessors from 14 to 10. From 2015, the life annuity has been abolished.

=== Other issues ===
Rossi asked the central government not to renew Trenitalia's contract and instead to launch a European tender. Rossi exposed the poor condition of the trains and demanded better public funding.

In 2013, Rossi created a new waste plan, proposing to achieve 70% waste sorting by 2020 without new waste plants.

In 2014, Rossi created a landscape plan that protects 365 areas from possible "Ecomonsters" (buildings that spoil the landscape).

== Commitment to the European Union ==
In Europe, he is a socialist Member of the European Committee of the Regions (CoR), following the work of the Commission for Social Policy, Education, Employment, Research and Culture (SEDEC) and previously of the Commission for Economic Policy (ECON) and the Commission for Natural Resources (NAT). He contributed to the work of these Commissions with three Reports on the "European Union programme for social change and innovation", "Youth Employment Package", and "A Council Recommendation for the integration of the Long-Term unemployed".

He is also vice-president of the Conference of Peripheral Maritime Regions (CPMR) in charge of Cohesion. Since the beginning of the post-2020 negotiations, he has actively contributed to the discussion on the future of Cohesion policy presenting also an Open contribution for the post 2020, a position outlining his views on the future of the Cohesion. Firmly convinced about the importance of the #Cohesionalliance, in view of the EU elections he launched a territorial campaign “Europe in Tuscany” underlining the importance of ESIF funds, personally visiting 100 projects financed by ERDF, EARDF and ESF in Tuscany. Representatives from DG REGIO, including the former Commissioner of Regional Policy, Corina Creţu, participated in some visits. He has been invited to the “7th Cohesion Forum”, where he presented the Case study of Tuscany.

Enrico Rossi is a convinced socialist and pro-European politician. In 2018, he was the promoter of the Manifesto "Left: Labour, Europe, Fairness, Tolerance" aiming at reforming the European governance, reinforcing the communitarian method and enhancing socialist identity. In 2019, he published a book "It is not enough to say Europe" with an introduction of the PES Spitzenkandidat Frans Timmermans and the British singer living in Tuscany, Sting.
