= Claudio Martini =

Italian politician (born 1951)

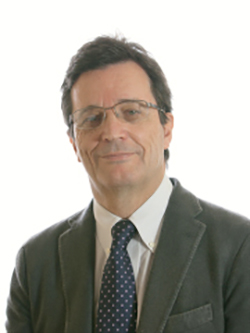

Member of the Senate
- In office 16 March 2013 – 22 March 2018
- Constituency: Tuscany

6th President of Tuscany
- In office 18 May 2000 – 16 April 2010
- Preceded by: Vannino Chiti
- Succeeded by: Enrico Rossi

Regional assessor for Healthcare of Tuscany
- In office 13 June 1995 – 18 May 2000
- President: Vannino Chiti

Mayor of Prato
- In office 2 June 1989 – 24 April 1995
- Preceded by: Alessandro Lucarini
- Succeeded by: Fabrizio Mattei

Personal details
- Born: 10 January 1951 (age 75) Le Bardo, Tunisia
- Party: PCI (till 1991); PDS (1991–1998); DS (1998–2007); PD (since 2007)
- Profession: Politician

Claudio Martini (born 10 January 1951) is an Italian politician who is the former president of Tuscany.

== Biography ==
Born in Le Bardo, Tunisia, from two parents from Livorno, Martini began his career in the Prato section of the Italian Communist Youth Federation.

In 1985 Martini was elected local secretary of the Italian Communist Party in Prato, and in 1989 he was appointed Mayor, carrying out several important projects for the Tuscan city, including the creation of the Province of Prato in 1992.

At the 1995 regional election, Martini was elected Regional councilor, supporting the candidate of the centre-left coalition Vannino Chiti, and was appointed Regional Assessor for Healthcare.

=== President of Tuscany ===
Claudio Martini during a conference in Florence, Italy

At the 2000 regional election, Martini was the candidate of the centre-left coalition as President of Tuscany and managed to get elected, defeating former Minister and House of Freedom candidate Altero Matteoli. He later managed to seek re-election at the 2005 regional election, holding his seat as governor until 2010.

=== Senator ===
At the 2013 general election, Martini was elected Senator for the Democratic Party. He was not a candidate at the 2018 general election.
