= Emilio Bonifazi =

Italian politician (born 1961)

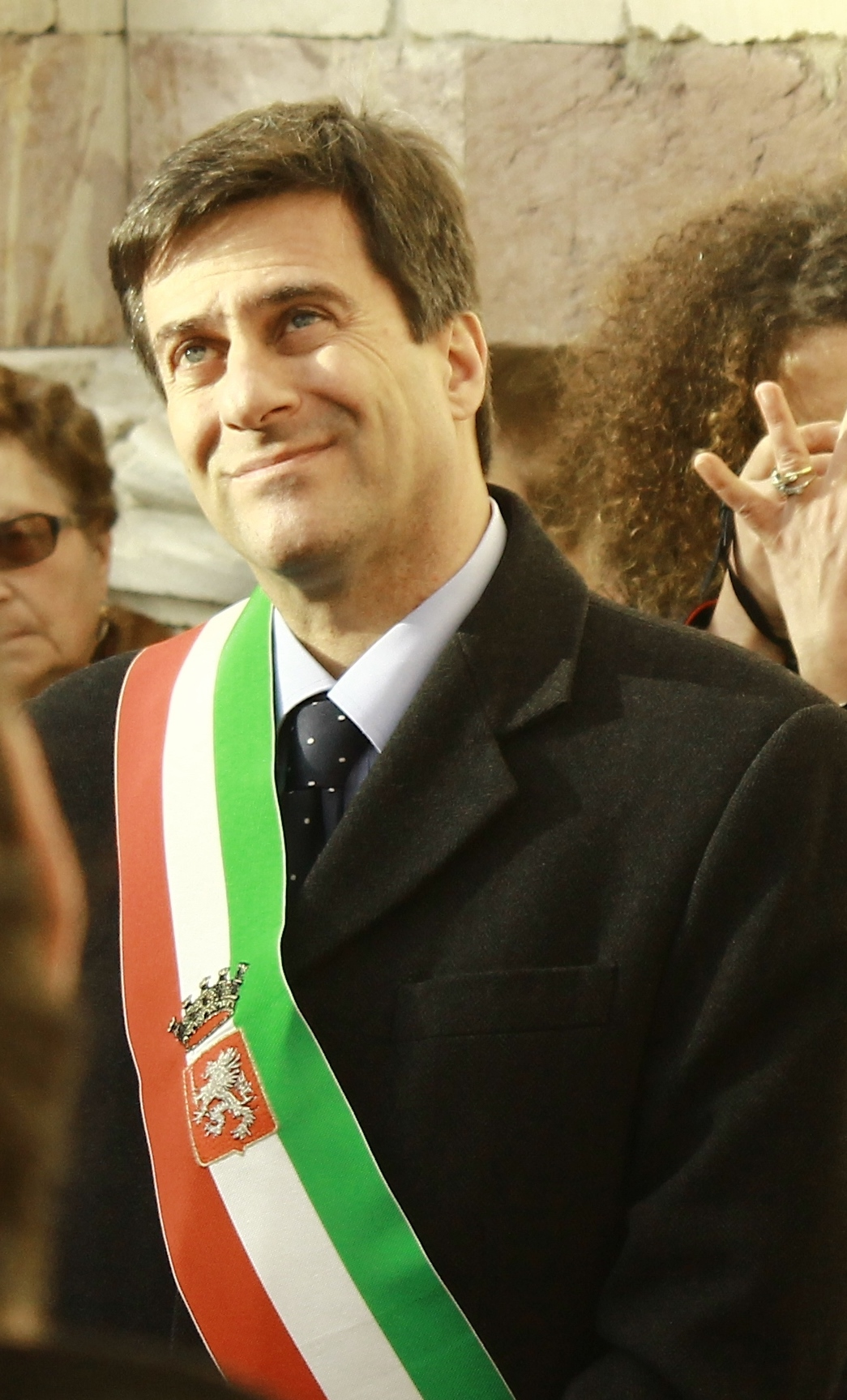

President of the Province of Grosseto
- In office 13 October 2014 – 19 July 2016
- Preceded by: Leonardo Marras
- Succeeded by: Antonfrancesco Vivarelli Colonna

Mayor of Grosseto
- In office 31 May 2006 – 22 June 2016
- Preceded by: Alessandro Antichi
- Succeeded by: Antonfrancesco Vivarelli Colonna

Mayor of Follonica
- In office 8 May 1995 – 17 June 2004
- Preceded by: Enrico Norcini
- Succeeded by: Claudio Saragosa

Personal details
- Born: 18 July 1961 (age 64) Frasso Sabino, Province of Rieti, Italy
- Party: DC (1985-1994); PPI (1994-1998); DS (1998-2002); DL (2002-2007); PD (since 2007)
- Occupation: Politician, teacher

Emilio Bonifazi (born 18 July 1961) is an Italian politician of the Democratic Party who served as mayor of Grosseto from 2006 to 2016, and president of the Province of Grosseto from 2014 to 2016.

== Life and career ==
Born in Frasso Sabino, Bonifazi moved at a young age to the Maremma region of Tuscany. He graduated in law from the University of Pisa and worked as a lawyer, insurance executive, and teacher of law and economics. From 2004 to 2006, he was president of COSECA, the public waste-management company of the Province of Grosseto.

Bonifazi began his political career in Christian Democracy and was elected to the municipal council of Massa Marittima in 1985. In 1995, he was elected mayor of Follonica, winning re-election in 1999. He later served on the Provincial Council of Grosseto before being elected mayor of Grosseto in 2006 for The Daisy. In 2007 he joined the Democratic Party. He was re-elected in 2011 at a runoff against Mario Lolini, and remained in office until 2016.

Bonifazi was elected president of the Province of Grosseto in October 2014. He resigned from the office in July 2016 after leaving the mayoralty of Grosseto.

In 2019, he ran unsuccessfully for mayor of Scarlino and was elected to the municipal council as an opposition councillor. In 2020, he was appointed sole administrator of Sea Ambiente, a public waste-management company based in Viareggio.

== Books ==
- Bonifazi, Emilio (2002). Follonica e i suoi amministratori 1923-2002. Follonica: Editrice Leopoldo II.
- Bonifazi, Emilio; Vella, Lucia; Madeo, Luigi (2004). La città che cambia. Opere pubbliche a Follonica dal 1995 al 2003. Follonica: Editrice Leopoldo II.
- Bonifazi, Emilio (2004). Gregorio Rossi (ed.). La Civica pinacoteca Amedeo Modigliani. Gli anni di Follonica nel mondo dell'arte. Follonica: Editrice Leopoldo II.
- Bonifazi, Emilio (2009). Grosseto e i suoi amministratori dal 1944 al 2009. Grosseto: Editrice Innocenti.
- Bonifazi, Emilio (2015). Grosseto e i suoi amministratori dal 1944 al 2015. Grosseto: SEMAR.

Political offices
Preceded by Leonardo Marras	President of the Province of Grosseto; 2014–2016	Succeeded by Antonfrancesco Vivarelli Colonna
Preceded by Alessandro Antichi	Mayor of Grosseto; 2006–2011	Succeeded by Antonfrancesco Vivarelli Colonna
