= Nicola Guerrazzi =

Italian military and patriot (1836–1912)

- Born: 16 May 1836; Palaia, Grand Duchy of Tuscany
- Died: 10 July 1912 (aged 76); Follonica, Massa Marittima; Province of Grosseto, Kingdom of Italy

Nicola Guerrazzi (16 May 1836 – 10 July 1912) was an Italian soldier and patriot who fought with Giuseppe Garibaldi for the Unification of Italy.

== Biography ==
Born in Palaia to Anton Maria Guerrazzi and Maria Campinotti, Guerrazzi completed his studies in Florence, where at the age of sixteen he received a silver medal for civil valor from the Florentine municipality for saving the lives of a woman and a child following an accident along the Arno riverbanks. Drawn to liberal and democratic positions, he was arrested and taken to the Prison of Bargello in 1855, for participating in a demonstration. After his release, he moved to Lucca and then to Genoa, but had to leave this city as well for participating in republican initiatives. Moving to Marseille, he came into contact with Felice Orsini with the intention of joining him in Paris, but arrived shortly after the attempted assassination of Napoleon III and was forced to flee to Barcelona.

Returning to Italy in 1859, he participated in the Second Italian War of Independence as a second lieutenant in Giuseppe Garibaldi's Hunters of the Alps and in 1860 he volunteered with Garibaldi's Expedition of the Thousand. He fought in Sicily with Nicotera's expedition and was promoted to the rank of captain for acts of valor after the Battle of the Volturno. In 1865, he settled as a worker in Follonica. In 1867, Guerrazzi organized a group of volunteers for the "Maremma Column", whose aim was to join Garibaldi's troops to move towards the liberation of Rome; the "Maremma Column" crossed into the Papal States and clashed with the Papal troops in Farnese.

Returning to Follonica, he married Adele Mazzoni, the daughter of Tuscan triumvir Giuseppe Mazzoni, in his second marriage in 1872. In October 1888, he ran for the Chamber of Deputies in the Pistoia constituency, representing the city of Prato, but obtained only 721 votes against the 2,889 of his opponent Michelangelo Bastogi.

Guerrazzi maintained deeply rooted anti-clerical positions throughout his life, hoping until the end of his days for the realization of a "universal Republic". He died in Follonica on 10 July 1912. As a prominent Freemason, the Masonic lodge of Massa Marittima, founded in 1967 and located in Palazzo Malfatti, was named after him. Additionally, a square in Follonica bears his name.

== Sources ==
- Gaetano Badii (1933). "Nicola Guerrazzi". In Michele Rosi (ed.). Dizionario del Risorgimento nazionale. Vol. 3. Milan: Vallardi. p. 276.
- Anna Bonelli (2011). "Studi sul Fondo antico della Chelliana di Grosseto". In Cristina Cavallaro (ed.). Books Seem to Me to Be Pestilent Things. Studi in onore di Piero Innocenti per i suoi 65 anni. Manziana: Vecchiarelli.
- Lucio Niccolai, ed. (2008). L'odore della terra. Biografie di uomini e donne che hanno fatto la Maremma tra XIX e XX secolo. Arcidosso: Effigi.
