= Prata, Massa Marittima =

Prata
- Frazione
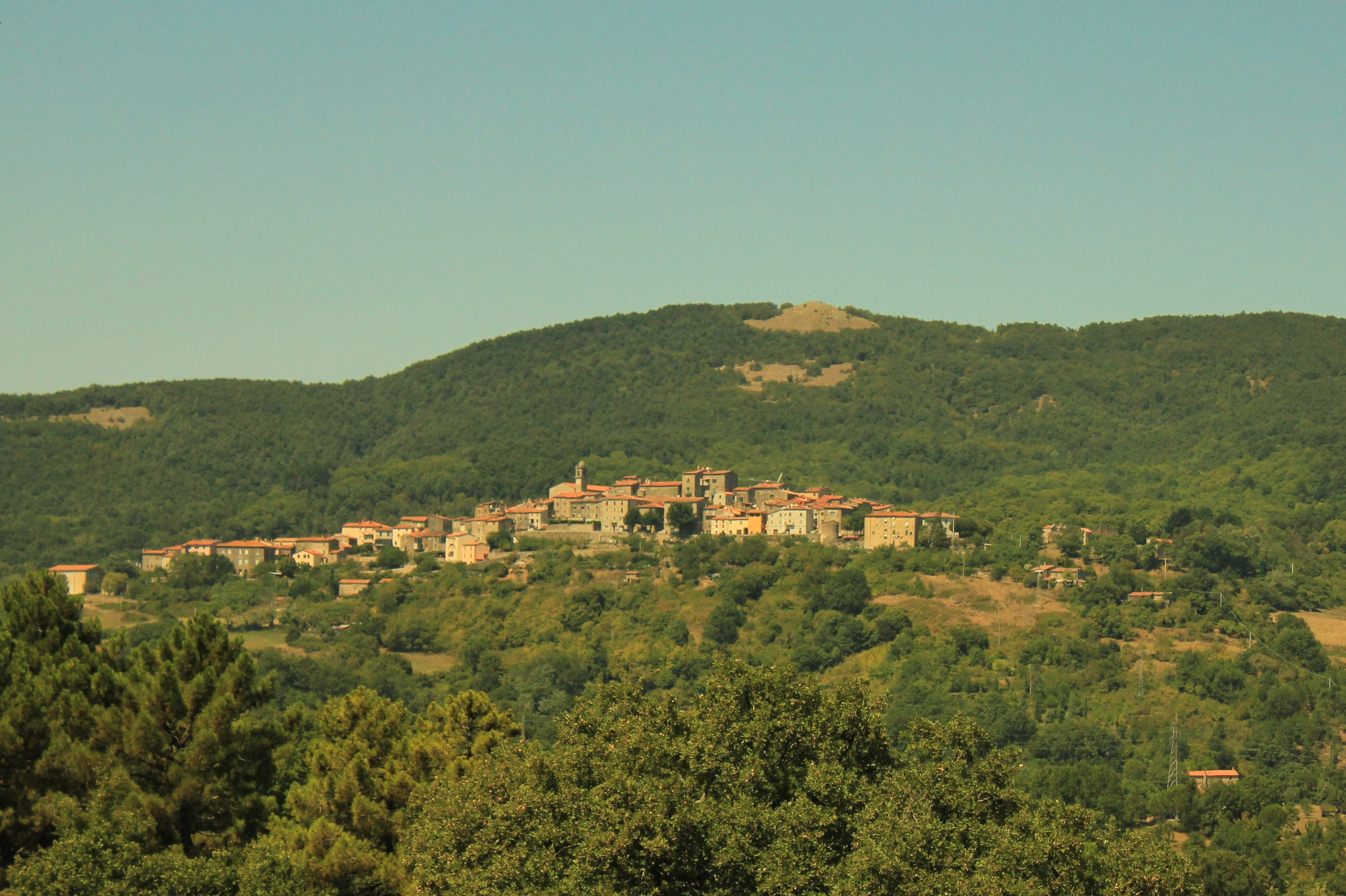
- View of Prata

- Location of Prata in Italy
- Coordinates: 43°04′59″N 10°59′07″E
- Country: Italy
- Region: Tuscany
- Province: Grosseto (GR)
- Comune: Massa Marittima
- Elevation: 620 m (2,030 ft)

Population (2011)
  - Total: 584
- Demonym: Pratigiani
- Time zone: UTC+1 (CET)
  - Summer (DST): UTC+2 (CEST)
- Postal code: 58020

Prata is a village in Tuscany, central Italy, administratively a frazione of the comune of Massa Marittima, province of Grosseto, in the area of the Colline Metallifere. At the time of the 2001 census its population amounted to 559.

Prata is about 48 km from Grosseto and 12 km from Massa Marittima, and it is a small medieval village (12th century) situated on a hill of Colline Metallifere.

== Main sights ==
- Santa Maria Assunta, main parish church of the village, it was originally built as a pieve in the 12th century.
- Ruins of Cassero, a 13th-century fortress.

== Bibliography ==
- Aldo Mazzolai, Guida della Maremma. Percorsi tra arte e natura, Le Lettere, Florence, 1997.

== See also ==
- Ghirlanda
- Montebamboli
- Niccioleta
- Tatti, Massa Marittima
- Valpiana
