= Niccioleta =

- Frazione
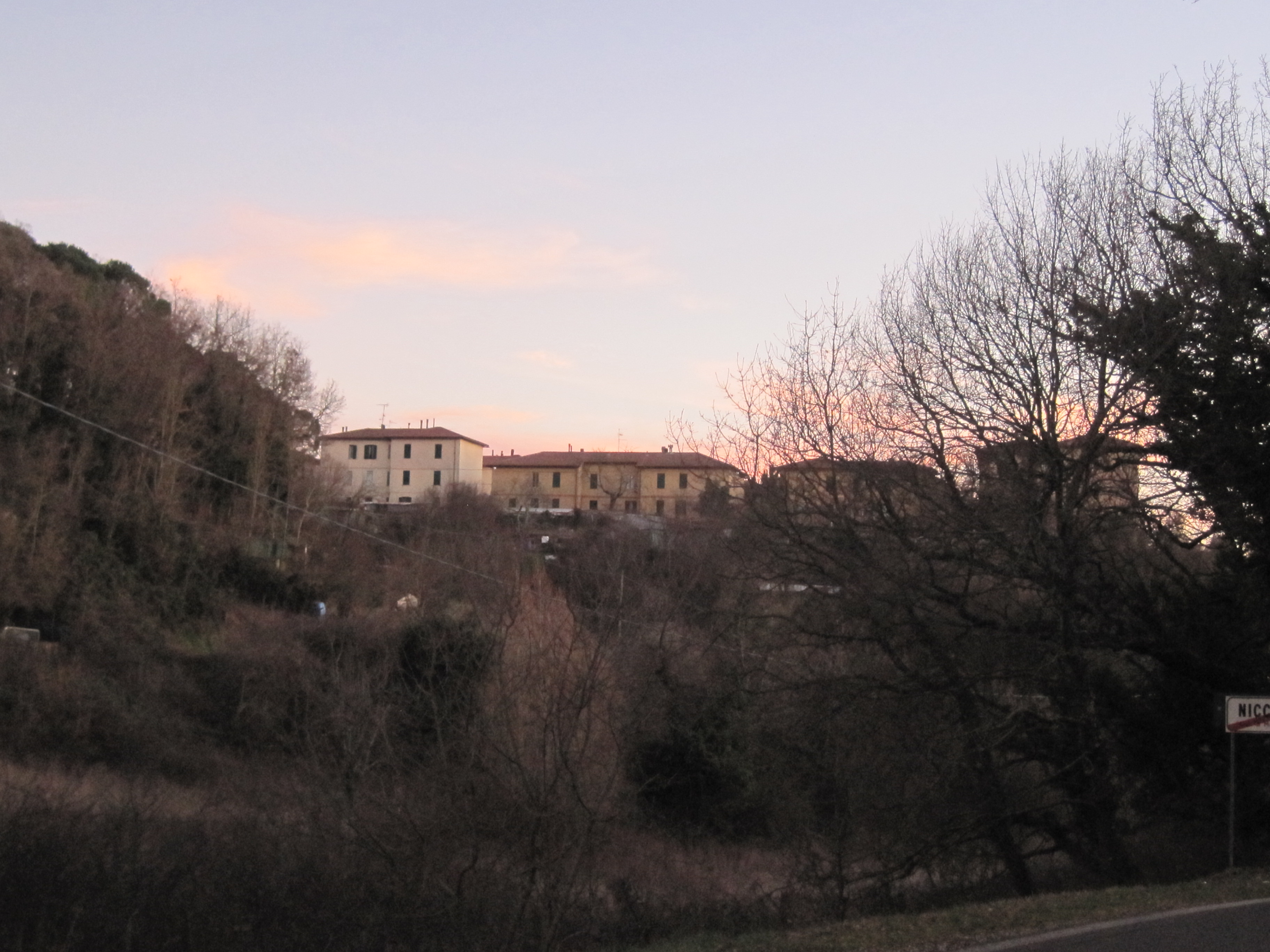
- View of Niccioleta

- Location of Niccioleta in Italy
- Coordinates: 43°05′14″N 10°56′06″E
- Country: Italy
- Region: Tuscany
- Province: Grosseto (GR)
- Comune: Massa Marittima
- Elevation: 460 m (1,510 ft)

Population (2011)
  - Total: 197
- Demonym: Niccioletani
- Time zone: UTC+1 (CET)
  - Summer (DST): UTC+2 (CEST)
- Postal code: 58020

Niccioleta is a village in Tuscany, central Italy, administratively a frazione of the comune of Massa Marittima, province of Grosseto, in the area of the Colline Metallifere. At the time of the 2001 census its population amounted to 248.

Niccioleta is about 54 km from Grosseto and 5 km from Massa Marittima, and it is situated on a hill rich of mines of calamine and pyrite. The town is known for the slaughter of civilians performed by the fascists between 13 and 14 June 1944.

== Main sights ==
- Santa Barbara, main parish church of the village, it was built in 1950s.
- Niccioleta War Memorial, memorial stone in remembrance of those killed in the massacre of June 1944, when eighty-four workers of the Niccioleta mines were shot by the fascists.

== Bibliography ==
- Aldo Mazzolai, Guida della Maremma. Percorsi tra arte e natura, Le Lettere, Florence, 1997.
- Paolo Pezzino, Storie di guerra civile. L'eccidio di Niccioleta, Bologna, Il Mulino, 2001.

== See also ==
- Ghirlanda
- Montebamboli
- Prata, Massa Marittima
- Tatti, Massa Marittima
- Valpiana
