= Tatti, Massa Marittima =

Tatti
- Frazione
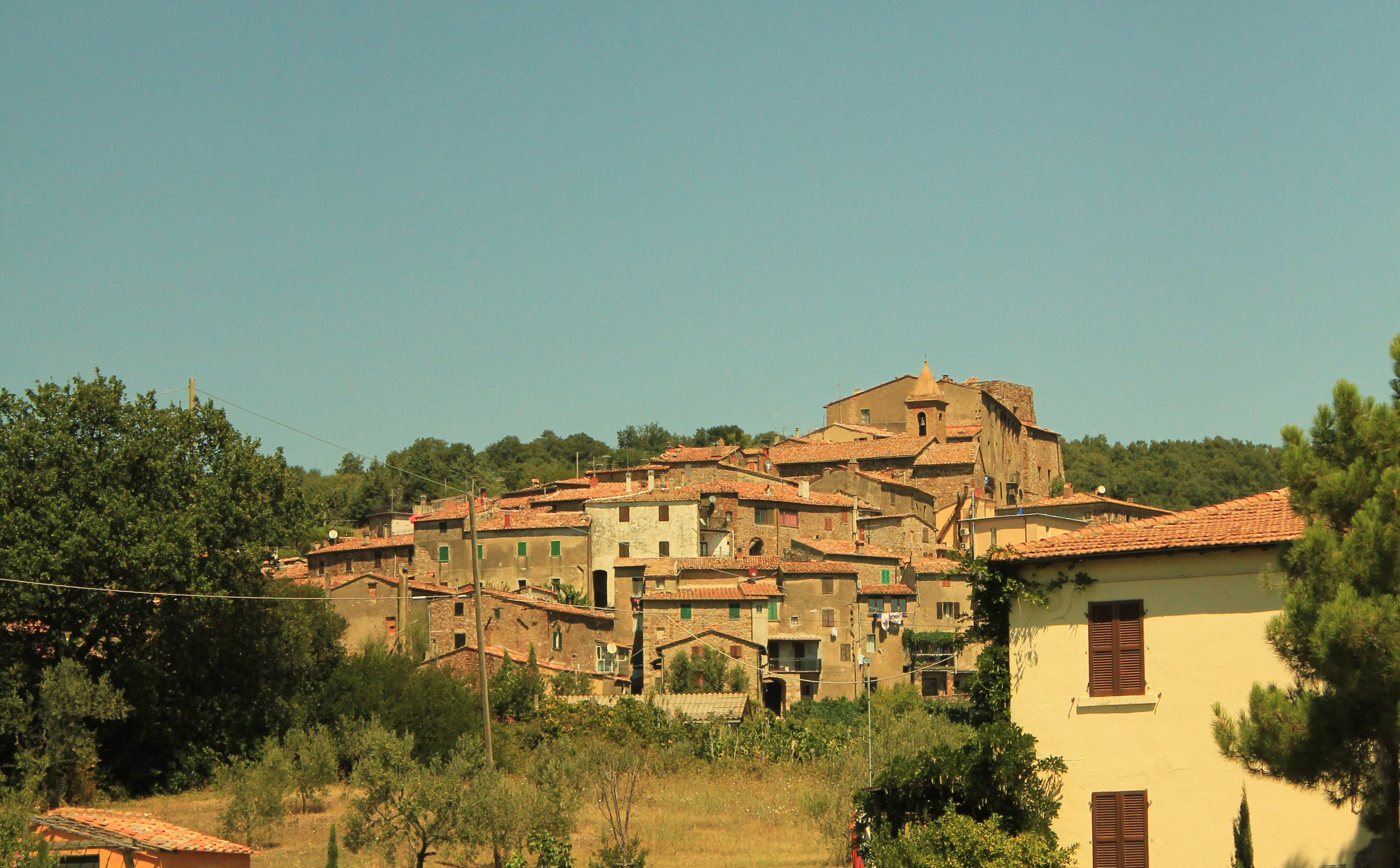
- View of Tatti

- Location of Tatti in Italy
- Coordinates: 43°01′21″N 11°01′39″E
- Country: Italy
- Region: Tuscany
- Province: Grosseto (GR)
- Comune: Massa Marittima
- Elevation: 412 m (1,352 ft)

Population (2011)
  - Total: 209
- Demonym: Tatterini
- Time zone: UTC+1 (CET)
  - Summer (DST): UTC+2 (CEST)
- Postal code: 58040

Tatti is a village in Tuscany, central Italy, administratively a frazione of the comune of Massa Marittima, province of Grosseto, in the area of the Colline Metallifere. At the time of the 2001 census its population amounted to 231.

Tatti is about 37 km from Grosseto and 20 km from Massa Marittima, and it is a small medieval village (11th century) situated on a hill of Colline Metallifere.

== Main sights ==
- Santa Maria Assunta, main parish church of the village, it was built in the 12th century and rebuilt in the 19th century in a Neoclassical style.
- San Sebastiano, an ancient little church restructured in the 18th century.
- Santissima Annunziata, a church of medieval origins, it is situated outside the centre of the village.
- Rocca Aldobrandesca, a 13th-century fortress built by the Aldobrandeschi.
- Walls of Tatti, old fortifications which surround the village since the 9th century (rebuilt in the 13th century).

== People ==
- Gabriele Bellettini (1943–2022), politician

== Bibliography ==
- Bruno Santi, Guida storico-artistica alla Maremma. Itinerari culturali nella provincia di Grosseto, Siena, Nuova Immagine, 1995, pp. 51–52.
- Aldo Mazzolai, Guida della Maremma. Percorsi tra arte e natura, Le Lettere, Florence, 1997.

== See also ==
- Ghirlanda
- Montebamboli
- Niccioleta
- Prata, Massa Marittima
- Valpiana
