= Valpiana =

- Frazione
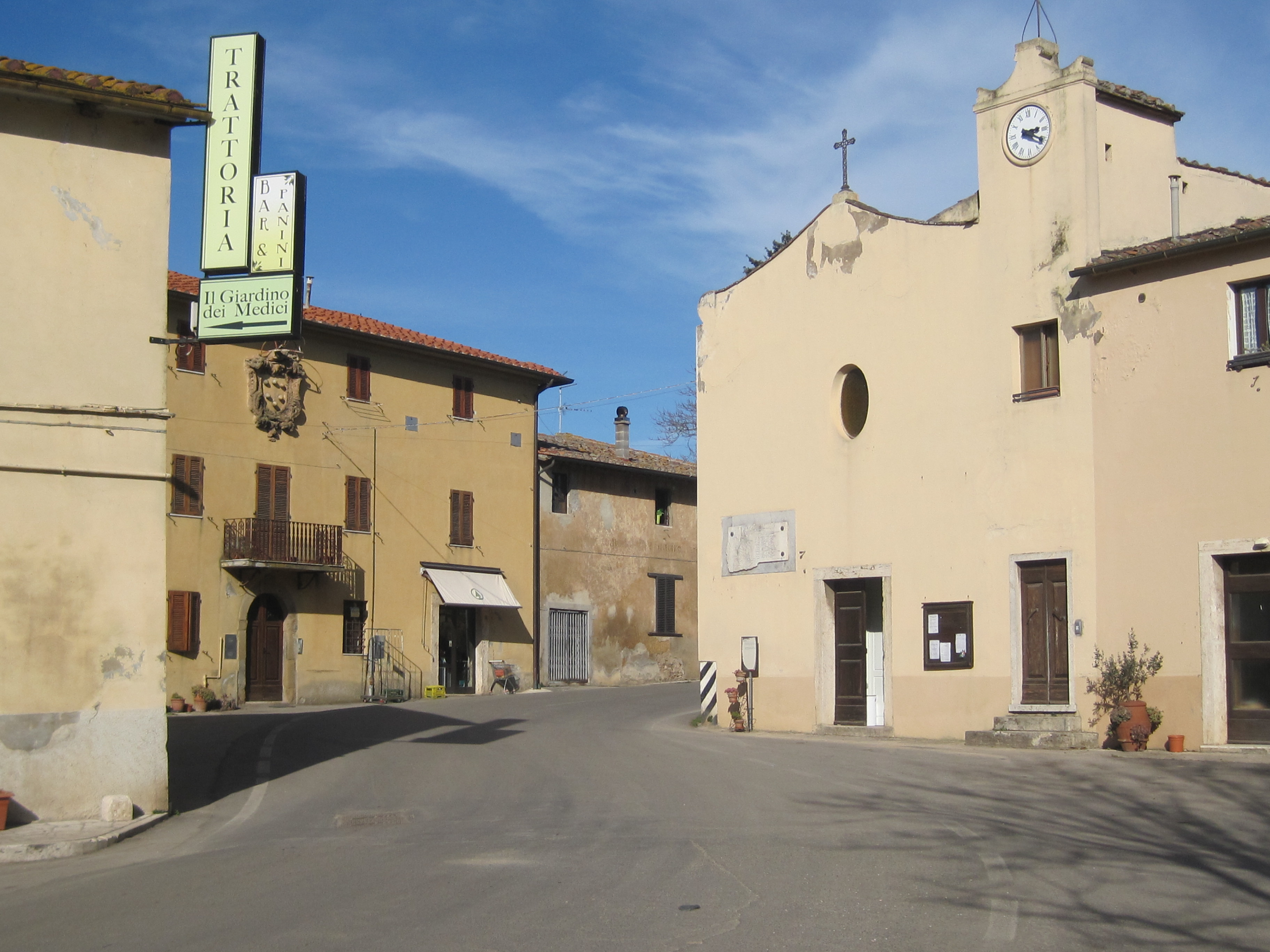
- The main square of Valpiana with the church and the palace of Ministers

- Location of Valpiana in Italy
- Coordinates: 43°00′18″N 10°51′05″E
- Country: Italy
- Region: Tuscany
- Province: Grosseto (GR)
- Comune: Massa Marittima
- Elevation: 145 m (476 ft)

Population (2011)
  - Total: 499
- Demonym: Valpianesi
- Time zone: UTC+1 (CET)
  - Summer (DST): UTC+2 (CEST)
- Postal code: 58020

Valpiana is a village in Tuscany, central Italy, administratively a frazione of the comune of Massa Marittima, province of Grosseto, in the area of the Colline Metallifere. At the time of the 2001 census its population amounted to 453.

Valpiana is about 45 km from Grosseto and 7 km from Massa Marittima.

== History ==
It was an ancient industrial centre of medieval Maremma. The industrial centre was closed in 1885. Its first furnaces were built by Tollo degli Albizzeschi, father of Bernardino da Siena.

== Main sights ==
- Cristo Re, main parish church of the village, it was built in the 17th century
- Palazzo of Ministers (16th century), old house of the administrators of the furnaces.
- Valpiana ironworks, ancient buildings dating from the 14th century to the 19th century, they attest the long tradition of iron in Valpiana.
- Aquarium Mondo Marino, the second largest aquarium in Tuscany, opened in 2009.

== Bibliography ==
- Aldo Mazzolai, Guida della Maremma. Percorsi tra arte e natura, Le Lettere, Florence, 1997.

== See also ==
- Ghirlanda
- Montebamboli
- Niccioleta
- Prata, Massa Marittima
- Tatti, Massa Marittima
