= Ghirlanda =

- Frazione
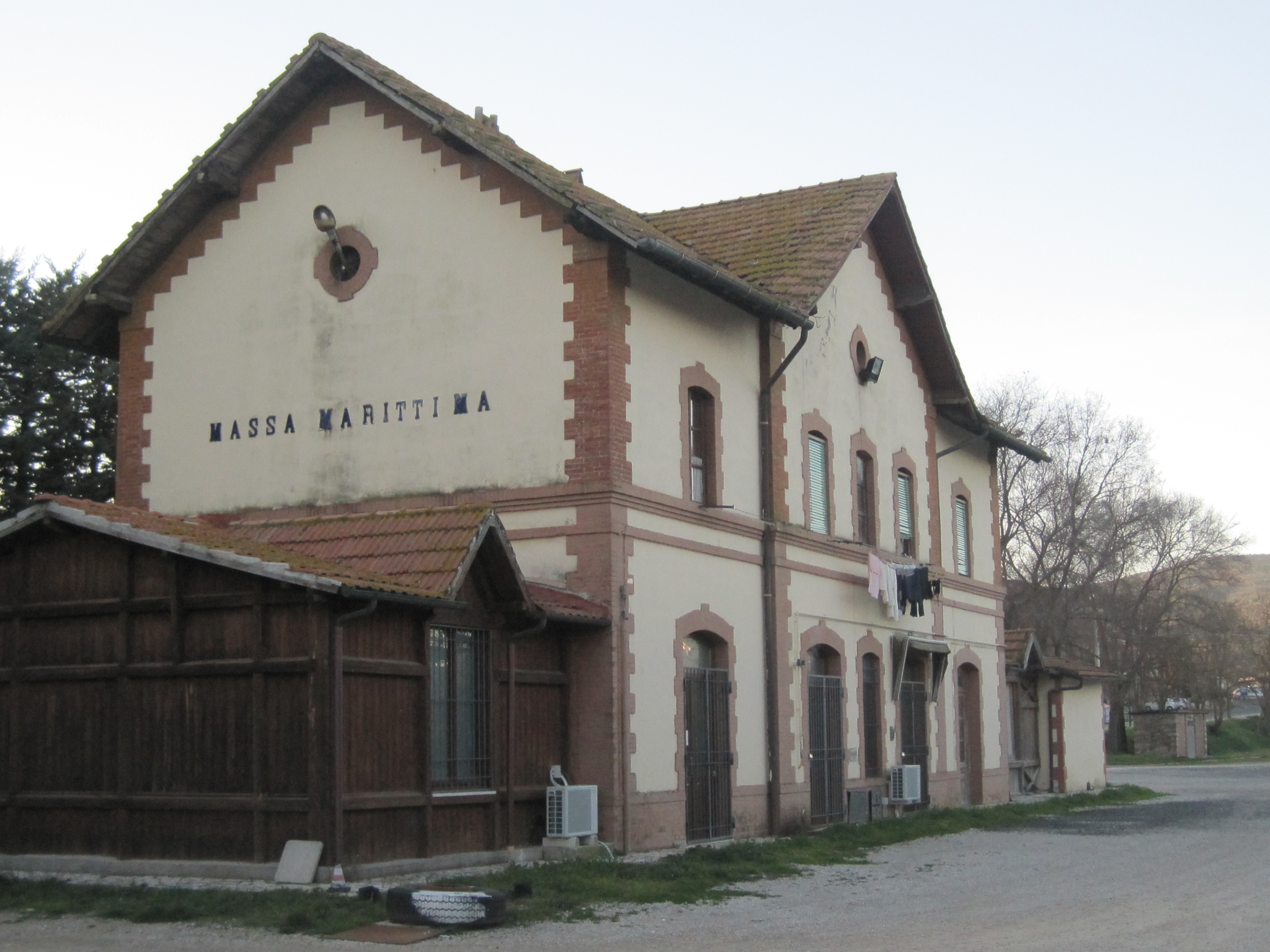
- The former train station in Ghirlanda

- Location of Ghirlanda in Italy
- Coordinates: 43°03′31″N 10°54′04″E
- Country: Italy
- Region: Tuscany
- Province: Grosseto (GR)
- Comune: Massa Marittima
- Elevation: 274 m (899 ft)

Population (2011)
  - Total: 213
- Demonym: Ghirlandini
- Time zone: UTC+1 (CET)
  - Summer (DST): UTC+2 (CEST)
- Postal code: 58020

Ghirlanda is a village in Tuscany, central Italy, administratively a frazione of the comune of Massa Marittima, province of Grosseto, in the area of the Colline Metallifere. At the time of the 2001 census its population amounted to 173.

Ghirlanda is about 48 km from Grosseto and 2 km from Massa Marittima, and it is situated on the northern slopes of the hill of Massa.

== Main sights ==
- Ghirlanda train station, former station of Massa Marittima, northern terminal of the Massa Marittima–Follonica railway.
- Mulino Badii, imposing mill of 19th century with Art Nouveau decorations
- Fountain of Bufalona, it is remembered for the rest that Giuseppe Garibaldi had here on 2 September 1849.

== Bibliography ==
- Aldo Mazzolai, Guida della Maremma. Percorsi tra arte e natura, Le Lettere, Florence, 1997.

== See also ==
- Montebamboli
- Niccioleta
- Prata, Massa Marittima
- Tatti, Massa Marittima
- Valpiana
