= Parenti =

Parenti may refer to:

- Parenti (surname)
- Parenti, Calabria, a comune in the Province of Cosenza, Italy
- Parenti, an incorrect spelling of Perentie, a species of Australian monitor lizard
