= Gaetano Badii =

Italian historian and librarian (1867–1937)

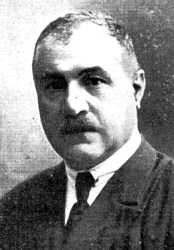
- Born: 6 November 1867; Massa Marittima, Province of Grosseto, Kingdom of Italy
- Died: 3 September 1937 (aged 69); Massa Marittima, Province of Grosseto, Kingdom of Italy
- Occupations: Historian, librarian, archaeologist, accountant

Gaetano Badii (6 November 1867 – 3 September 1937) was an Italian historian, librarian and archaeologist. A supporter of Giuseppe Mazzini and proponent of human emancipation, Badii was a self-taught scholar who earned a diploma as an accountant and improved his economic position. His passion for study led him to focus on the Risorgimento, the mining history of his area, Etruscan studies, and prehistoric discoveries.

== Life and career ==
Gaetano Badii was born in Massa Marittima on 6 November 1867, to Agostino Badii and Marianna Baldini. His father, who fought as a volunteer with Giuseppe Garibaldi at Volturno and in Tyrol, died in 1885. Due to his family's poverty, Badii had to leave school and began working in the mines at the age of fourteen in 1882, where he distinguished himself and eventually became a foreman. After becoming orphaned, he was responsible for his three sisters and brother. During his mining years, he became actively involved in politics as a Republican and engaged with key figures in the party, significantly impacting the political movement in Massa Marittima.

In 1889, Badii married Erminda Conticelli, and they had four children: Pericle, Maria, Aldo, and Fidelia. After working in the mines for over twenty years, he left in 1906 to take up administrative roles, starting as an accountant for the municipality of Massa Marittima. He served as a municipal councilor from 1892, assessor from 1907 to 1910, and provincial councilor from 1905 to 1911. His cooperative experience led to significant roles, including secretary of the Trieste Cooperative Society.

In 1911, Badii secured a stable position as the secretary of the Congregation of Charity in Massa Marittima, overseeing the Sant'Andrea Hospital and the Poorhouse. He was also appointed correspondent for the National Committee for the History of the Italian Risorgimento for the province of Grosseto. As director of the Municipal Library and Civic Museum until his death, his contributions were honored by naming the institute after him. During World War I, he actively participated in civil assistance efforts and suffered from the loss of his son Pericle, who died in Trentino on 20 October 1918.

In 1921, Badii was appointed honorary inspector for antiquities and art, a role he held until 1933. He promoted excavation campaigns in Massa, leading to significant discoveries like prehistoric "Tane" and Etruscan settlements around Lake Accesa. He was a member of the National Committee for Monuments and Excavations and the Italian Philological Academy. He also advocated for the establishment of a mining school in Massa Marittima and contributed to the Dizionario del Risorgimento nazionale ("Dictionary of the National Risorgimento") by Michele Rosi.

Badii died in Massa Marittima on 3 September 1937.

== Sources ==
- Giacomo Adami (2007). Gaetano Badii. Storico del Risorgimento massetano. Massa Marittima: Biblioteca Comunale G. Badii.
- Gianpiero Caglianone (1999). Bibliografia massetana. Raccolta storico-critica ragionata degli scritti relativi a Massa Marittima e delle opere di scrittori e tipografi massetani (1579-1998). Massa Marittima: Centro studi storici "A. Gabrielli".
- Lucio Niccolai, ed. (2008). L'odore della terra. Biografie di uomini e donne che hanno fatto la Maremma tra XIX e XX secolo. Arcidosso: Effigi.
- Teodoro Rovito (1922). Letterati e giornalisti italiani contemporanei. Dizionario bio-bibliografico. Naples: Rovito. p. 25.
- Sergio Samek Ludovici (1942). Storici, teorici e critici delle arti figurative (1800-1940). Milan: Istituto editoriale italiano Bernardo Carlo Tosi. p. 39.
- Simonetta Soldatini (2008). Risorgimento nazionale e patria locale. La raccolta documentaria di Gaetano Badii nell'Archivio storico comunale di Massa Marittima. Inventario. Siena: Betti Editrice.
