= Parenti (surname) =

Parenti is an Italian surname. Notable people with the surname include:

- Andrea Parenti (born 1965), Italian archer
- Christian Parenti, American journalist
- Edward Parenti (born 1971), Canadian swimmer
- Franco Parenti (1921–1989), Italian actor and stage director
- Giovanni Parenti (died 1250), Italian Friar Minor and successor of St. Francis of Assisi as head of the Order
- Irene Parenti Duclos, academic nickname Lala Cicicena (1754–1795), Italian painter and poet
- Lynne R. Parenti (born 1954), American ichthyologist
- Michael Parenti (1933–2026), American political scientist, academic historian and cultural critic
- Neri Parenti (born 1950), Italian film director
- Norma Pratelli Parenti (1921–1944), Italian partisan
- Rino Parenti (1895–1953), Italian fascist leader
- Tony Parenti (1900–1972), American jazz clarinettist and saxophonist
