= Michele Rosi =

Italian historian and teacher

- Born: 29 September 1864; Pieve di Camaiore, Tuscany, Kingdom of Italy
- Died: 23 January 1934 (aged 69); Lucca, Tuscany, Kingdom of Italy
- Education: Pisa
- Occupations: Historian; School teacher University teacher Author-publisher
- Parents: Basilio Rosi (father); Ersilia Lazzarini (mother)

Michele Rosi (29 September 1864 – 23 January 1934) was an Italian historian and teacher, initially at school level and later, between 1897 and 1933, at the Sapienza University in Rome. His earlier publications covered the late medieval and early modern periods: he became better known for his contributions on the nineteenth century history of Italian unification. There was no place for hagiography in Rosi's historical approach. His insistence on methodical source-based research, and on excluding from serious historical scholarship the mythologising of contemporary romanticists and politicians, led to him being characterised as a prominent representative of the first generation of Risorgimento revisionist historians. In Mussolini's Italy, the revisionists' approach did not go unchallenged.

== Biography ==
=== Life ===
Michele Rosi was born at Pieve di Camaiore, along the urbanising coastal strip to the north-west of Lucca. He was the first-born of his parents' twelve sons. His childhood was cursed with early illness which left him partially paralysed down his right side for life. The condition became more pronounced as he grew older, which according to admirers served only to intensify his innate spiritual resilience. Both a junior school in Camaiore and at the "Liceo classico Niccolò Machiavelli" (secondary school) which he attended in Lucca, he was marked out as a diligent child who achieved excellent marks.

On 30 June 1888 he graduated with a first degree in Italian Literature from the "Scuola Normale Superiore" (university) in Pisa, where he was taught by both the polymath literature scholar Alessandro d'Ancona and the historian Amedeo Crivellucci. Student near-contemporaries with whose student years his own overlapped included Michele Barbi, Francesco Flamini, Felice Momigliano and Federigo Enriques. A couple of months after graduating he obtained a complementary diploma in History, which under the system then in place doubled as a secondary schools-level teaching qualification ("“diploma di magistero”"). This was secured with a dissertation on "Conditions of the Catholic Church under Liutprando and Liutprando relations with the Roman Pontiffs".

At the beginning of October 1888 he enrolled as a newly qualified teacher at the "ginnasio" at Recanati, away to the east, on the far side of the Apennine Mountains, where he stayed for barely more than a year. On 29 December 1889 he took up an appointment to teach History at the "Istituto tecnico" (college) in Catania (Sicily). The appointment was filled on the basis of a competitive procedure, and came with the designation "reggente". He moved on again in 1892, transferring with effect from 12 September to the "Istituto tecnico" (college) in Genoa, where he taught for the next four years. In 1896 he competed for a teaching post at the prestigious Liceo Tasso in Rome, and having succeeded in the process took up his new job at the end of 1896. The previous year he had obtained a lectureship at the University of Genoa, which he was able to combine with his school teaching. In 1897 he succeeded in transferring his university lectureship to the Sapienza University of Rome, where he taught courses in modern history. During this period he was developing his contacts and his experience in the universities sector. He nevertheless continued his work as a secondary school teacher till at least 1904, switching at the end of 1901 from the Liceo Tasso to the equally prestigious classical Liceo "Visconti".

In 1905 he obtained a permanent position at the university, which came with the responsibility for teaching the History of the Risorgimento. He retained this position till 1933, though a full teaching chair would always elude him. His superb teaching skills had been noted and would always count in his favour, but the historical interpretations and conclusions at which he arrived - especially with regard to a subject as close to the hearts of patriotic Italians as the Risorgimento - could divide opinions. Between January 1915 and September 1920, then again during the three academic years from 1923 till 1926 and thereafter permanently he became an associate of the Accademia dei Lincei after which he was able to dedicate himself full time to university-level research and teaching. He taught courses on the History of the Risorgimento and advanced history courses for students training for a teaching qualification, until these could be transferred to a new Faculty of Pedagogy. His own teaching skills continued to draw respect. Among his more noteworthy pupils were Alberto Maria Ghisalberti and Emilia Morelli. He applied for several ordinary [full] professorships between approximately 1910 and 1932 but without success. Perhaps the most disappointing example arose in 1925 when the University of Milan announced the creation of a new teaching chair in the "History of the Risorgimento". For admirers, who included, most prominently. the former (albeit pre-fascist) Minister of Public Education, Luigi Credaro, Rosi was the obvious choice. The final short-list of three comprised Francesco Lemmi, Giuseppe Gallavresi and Pietro Silva: Rosi's name was excluded from it. The appointments commission recorded some harsh criticisms against Rosi, citing his "poor judgement of documents and facts" and also commented adversely on his "historiographical reconstruction" and authorship. Within the faculty Rosi continued to encounter stiff resistance to his further career advancement. A particularly fervent critic, and a man of powerful influence, was the Hegelian philosopher turned fascist politician (and for eighteen months between 1922 and 1924 Italian Minister for Education) Giovanni Gentile, who as early as June 1918, when addressing the faculty council, asserted that Rosi "lacked basic knowledge" and that his written work was "like a chronicle", before concluding that he was not persuaded that Rosi was as good a teacher as [some] people said.

Michele Rosi died unmarried at Lucca on 23 January 1934.

== The man and his times ==
Michele Rosi was an instinctive conservative. He lived through momentous times, but never displayed any appetite to become politically involved. He was hostile to "militant politics" and to any attempts by its adherents to distort "pure scholarship" in support of political objectives. In his diary he was severely critical of the government's decision to lead Italy into the First World War and the abrupt (unexplained at the time) change in alliances that directly preceded it. The final twelve years of Rosi's life, after 1922, were lived under fascism. With greater conviction than ever, Rosi identified himself as apolitical during the Mussolini years. He never supported Fascism, disapproving of the systematic intimidation and attacks on the liberal institutions of the state by which it obtained and then retained power in Italy. Deeply attached to his Catholic faith, Rosi was critical of the 1929 "Lateran treaty" because of the way in which, by institutionalising the partial return of temporal power to the Holy See, he saw it as a step back from the separation between church and state which had been a major achievement of the Risorgimento. In his opinion a far simpler form of church:state concordat would have sufficed. At the same time, he never involved himself in active antifascist activism. In 1931 the government made it mandatory for university teachers to swear an oath of loyalty to the party: Rosi complied in what he evidently saw as a meaningless gesture which would make no difference to him: he had never been politically engaged in the first place. A widely held interpretation was that the fascist oath of loyalty seriously compromised the freedom to teach. For his part Rosi continued to believe, even after taking the oath, that teachers must be at the service "of scholarship and not of governments.

== Works ==
Rosi's early covered the late medieval and early modern periods, but quite early on he switched his focus to the Risorgimento. Unusually among his contemporaries, he had little direct family connection to the events that led to Italian unification. He was part of a generation of scholars for which there was a strong need to give the Risorgimento story an entirely new focus. Once and for all, there was a need to distance risorgimento scholarship from the hagiographic and dilettante vision which, at the start of the twentieth century cloaked the whole subject. There was a need to address what, at the time, still counted as "contemporary history" with the same methodological research approach as that employed for earlier periods. That drove an insistence on placing archival sources at the heart of the subject, and applying the time honoured philological-critical approach. Rosi himself tended to hold back from pronouncing too many verdicts on history, but the passage of time nevertheless clarified his own inclination to root Italian unification firmly in the eighteenth century, rather than as some sort of newly discovered nineteenth century manifestation of realpolitik, rampant nationalism and the self-perpetuating imposition across the western half of the continent of Anglo-French style nation states.

Fundamental in Rosi's switch to the History of the Risorgimento was his meeting with the Risorgimento veteran Antonio Mordini. He had originally sought out Mordini in order to try and obtain the great man's backing over the threatened nationalisation of the Royal College of Lucca, following a ministerial decision of Education Minister Guido Baccelli in 1899. Rosi and Mordini entered into a close friendship based on shared values and mutual respect, so that when Rosi learned of Mordini's death on 14 July 1902 he decided to dedicate a biographical study to his friend. The work was published in 1906 under the title "Il Risorgimento italiano e l’azione di un patriota, cospiratore e soldato" ("The Italian risorgimento and the actions of a patriot, a conspirator and a soldier"). Mordini's son Leonardo allowed Rosi unrestricted access to the family papers. Rosi was thereby supported in pursuit of his ambition, as he later expressed it, finally to write "a series of pages on the history of the Risorgimento". Keen to contextualise the information he was able to distil from the Mordini archive, Rosi also sought out some of the few remaining survivors of Risorgimento incidents and events, such as Luigi Guglielmo Cambray-Digny (1820-1906) and Giovanni Cadolini (1830-1917), in pursuit of documents and personal testimonies. Otherwise he contacted descendants of key Risorgimento protagonists. Several of these were well disposed to his researches and keen to help, notably the children and remoter heirs of Carlo Cairoli, as well as surviving members of Angelo Bargoni's family. Rosi followed up his study based on the Mordini papers two years later with "I Cairoli" ("The Cariolis", 1908), which was again based on a major archival research project. "I Cairoli" was republished in 1929, with amendments and additions.

Rosi's preference for presenting history through the prism of biography is also apparent in his more broadly focused history books such as "Storia contemporanea d’Italia" ("History of Italy today": 1914) and "L’Italia odierna. Due secoli di lotte, di studi e di lavoro per l’indipendenza e la grandezza della patria" (loosely, "Italy today: two centuries of struggle, progress and work for the independence and greatness of the homeland": 1916-1919), to which, for as long as he was able, the author kept returning in order to incorporate updates. It is also striking that in these works, as in most of his published work, Rosi hesitated to impose his own historiographical interpretations too prominently, preferring to let the facts and source documents tell their own tales, thereby providing a more rigorously grounded vision. Whether he was dealing with the eighteenth century or with contemporary history, the bias was generally in favour only of research-based objectivity.

More than eighty years after his death, Rosi's best known published work is the "Dizionario del Risorgimento nazionale" ("National Lexikon of the Risorgimento"), a series conceptualised and started between 1909 and 1913, and divided into two series: "Facts" (vol. 1) and "People" (vols. 2-4). Rosi was successful in attracting contributions from some of the most widely respected scholars of the age, such as Benedetto Croce and Pasquale Villari, as well as from other well-known writers such as Ferdinando Martini. There were also contributions from known Risorgimento scholars such as Giuseppe Gallavresi, and from a younger generation of historians, including Ersilio Michel and Alberto Maria Ghisalberti. The contributors were united only by a shared passion for and fascination with the Risorgimento. Some had unlikely backgrounds: Gaetano Badii, who would produce dozens of entries for the "Dizionario del Risorgimento nazionale", was an accountant by training and profession, even if in retrospect he is better remembered by scholars for his contributions as an historian. Rosi directed the entire enterprise closely, personally supervising most of the entries, especially those that might be construed as historiographically contentious or otherwise problematic. The long careful introduction that he added provided him with the chance to set out, more unambiguously than before, his own assessment that the origins of the Risorgimento were to be found in the writings and activities of eighteenth century Italian reformist thinkers such as Pagano and Beccaria. The project was halted by the outbreak of the First World War, which from an Italian perspective meant the early summer of 1915. It was only some years later, during the 1920s, after a protracted and at times acrimonious series of diatribes and other communications had been exchanged between Rosi and the Vallardi publishing house, that a decision was taken to go ahead and publish the "Dizionario del Risorgimento nazionale" in four volumes. It was a major undertaking, undertaken between 1930 and 1937: the final volume appeared only after Rosi's death.

== Output (selection) ==
- Saggio sui trattati d'amore del Cinquecento. Contributo alla storia dei costumi italiani nel secolo XVI, Recanati, Tip. Di Rinaldo Simboli, 1889.
- Longobardi e chiesa romana al tempo del re Luitprando, Catania, Tip. Martinez, 1890.
- Della signoria di Francesco Sforza nella Marca secondo le memorie dell'archivio recanatese, Recanati, Tip. di Rinaldo Simboli, 1895.
- Le monache nella vita genovese dal secolo XV al XVII, Genova, R. Istituto Sordo-muti, 1895.
- Storia delle relazioni fra la Repubblica di Genova e la Chiesa Romana specialmente considerate in rapporto alla Riforma religiosa, Roma, Tip. della R. Accademia dei Lincei, 1899.
- La scuola dei Lucchesi a Venezia (secoli XIV - XIX), Lucca, tip. Giusti, 1901.
- Antonio Mordini nella storia del risorgimento italiano, Roma, Unione cooperativa editrice, 1905.
- Lezioni di storia del risorgimento italiano. Anno accademico 1906-1907, a cura di Enea Cianetti, Roma, Fratelli Castellani, [1906?].
- I Cairoli, Torino, Fratelli Bocca, 1908. (online)
- La storia contemporanea d'Italia, Torino, Unione Tipografico-Editrice Torinese, 1914.
- L'Italia odierna. Due secoli di lotte, di studi e di lavoro per l'indipendenza e la grandezza della patria, pubblicato a fascicoli, 5 tomi, Torino, Unione Tipografico-Editrice Torinese, 1916-1927.
- Il popolo italiano negli ultimi due secoli (1700-1923). Sommario storico, Roma, Fondazione Leonardo, 1924.
- Il primato di Carlo V. La resistenza degli italiani e i precedenti relativi (secoli XIII-XVI), Roma, A. Signorelli, 1925.
- Vittorio Emanuele II, Bologna, L. Cappelli, 1930.
- Garibaldi, Bologna, L. Cappelli, 1932.
