= Massa Marittima railway station =

Former railway station in Italy

Massa Marittima
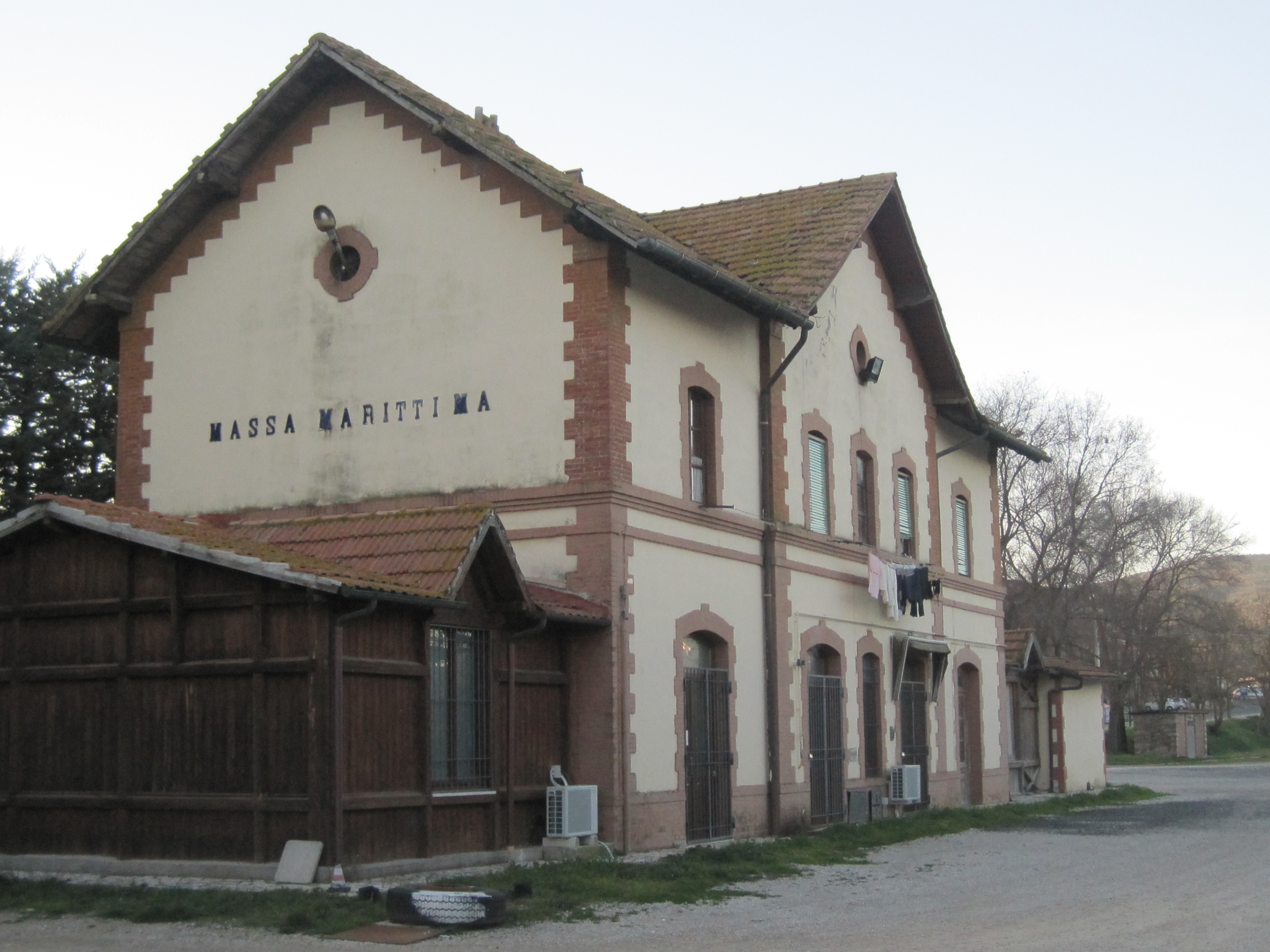

General information
- Location: Via di Perolla, Ghirlanda 58024; Massa Marittima, Grosseto, Tuscany; Italy
- Coordinates: 43°03′26.1″N 10°54′06.3″E
- Operator: Società Anonima della Ferrovia Massa Marittima–Follonica Porto
- Line: Massa Marittima–Follonica

History
- Opened: 11 December 1902; 123 years ago
- Closed: 1948; 78 years ago
Location
- Location within Tuscany Location within Italy

Massa Marittima railway station was an Italian railway station on the Massa Marittima–Follonica railway line, located in the village of Ghirlanda, serving the town of Massa Marittima, Province of Grosseto, Tuscany.

== History ==
The station opened on 11 December 1902 along with the inauguration of the Massa Marittima–Follonica railway, which connected the town of Massa Marittima with the port of Follonica.

The station served as the northern terminus of the railway and was primarily used for freight traffic from the mines of Val d'Aspra to the Tyrrhenian Sea. The station also offered a passenger service for local traffic, which was suspended in 1933. During the war, in 1941, a makeshift passenger service was restored. The station closed in 1944, along with the entire line, and was ultimately declared defunct in 1948.

== See also ==
- History of rail transport in Italy
- List of railway stations in Tuscany
- Rail transport in Italy
- Railway stations in Italy
