= Saint Bernardino of Siena (El Greco) =

1603 painting by El Greco

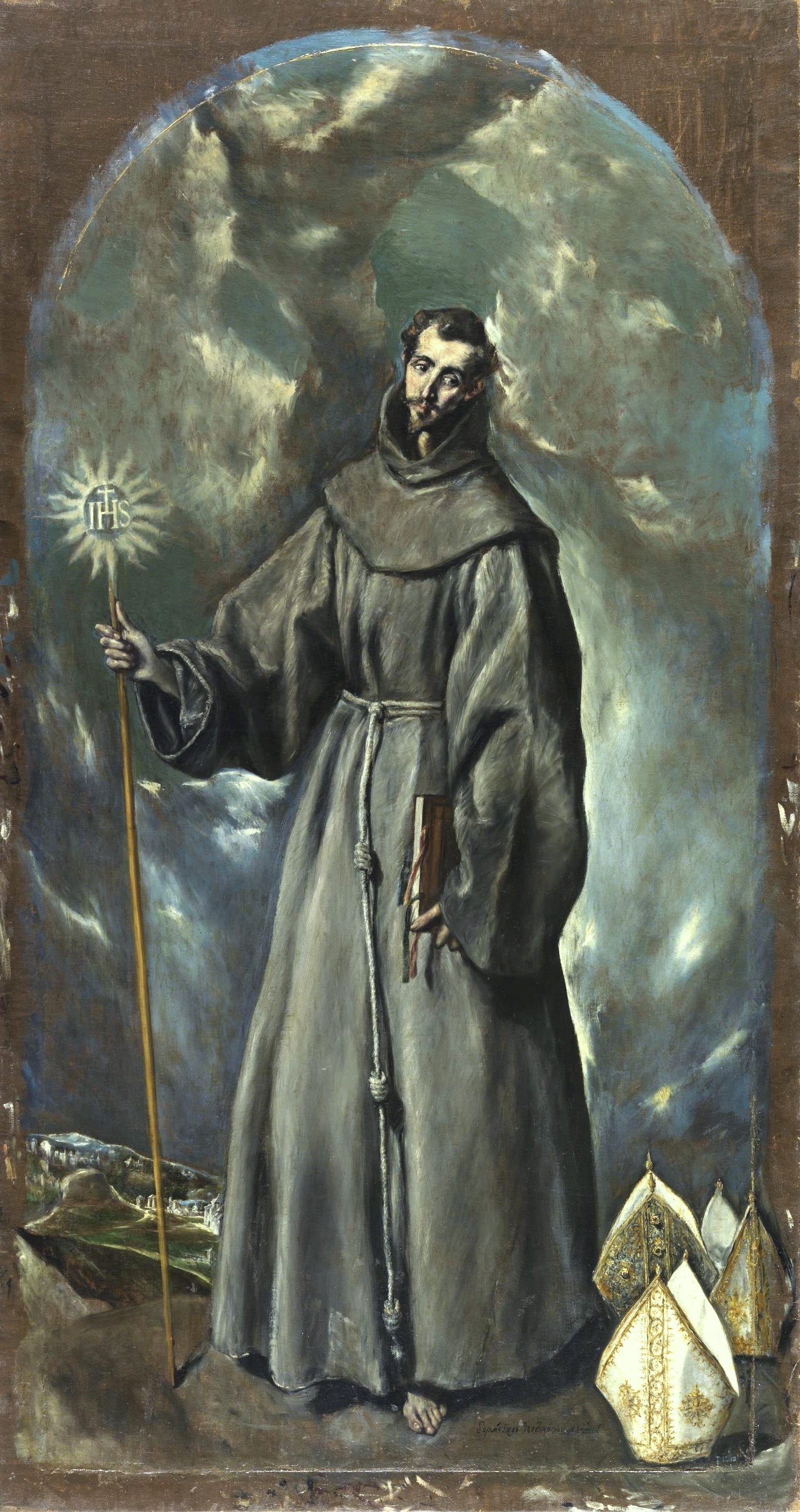
- Artist: El Greco
- Year: 1603
- Medium: oil on canvas
- Dimensions: 269 cm × 144 cm (106 in × 57 in)

Saint Bernardino of Siena is a 1603 work by El Greco. It is owned by the Museo del Prado but displayed at the El Greco Museum in Toledo, Spain.

Showing Bernardino of Siena in a Franciscan habit, holding a cane topped with the monogram IHS and with a book under his left arm, it was commissioned for the university college of San Bernardino in Toledo. He was paid 3,000 reales for it in February 1603 and it was ready the following September. In the left background is a landscape of the city of Toledo, featuring the monastery of San Bartolomé de la Vega, destroyed during the Peninsular War, and the Montero Chapel, which has also disappeared. In the right foreground are three mitres, each representing one of the bishoprics the saint declined (Siena, Urbino and Ferrara).

== See also ==
- List of works by El Greco

== Bibliography (in Spanish) ==
- ÁLVAREZ LOPERA, José, El Greco, Madrid, Arlanza, 2005, Biblioteca «Descubrir el Arte», (colección «Grandes maestros»). ISBN 84-9550-344-1.
- SCHOLZ-HÄNSEL, Michael, El Greco, Colonia, Taschen, 2003. ISBN 978-3-8228-3173-1.
- http://www.museodelprado.es/coleccion/galeria-on-line/galeria-on-line/obra/san-bernardino/
- https://web.archive.org/web/20100919101756/http://www.artehistoria.jcyl.es/genios/cuadros/1744.htm
