= San Francesco, Massa Marittima =

Gothic church and former convent in Massa Marittima, Italy

Coordinates: 43°03′11″N 10°53′24″E

San Francesco
- Church and convent of St. Francis
- Chiesa e convento di San Francesco (Italian)
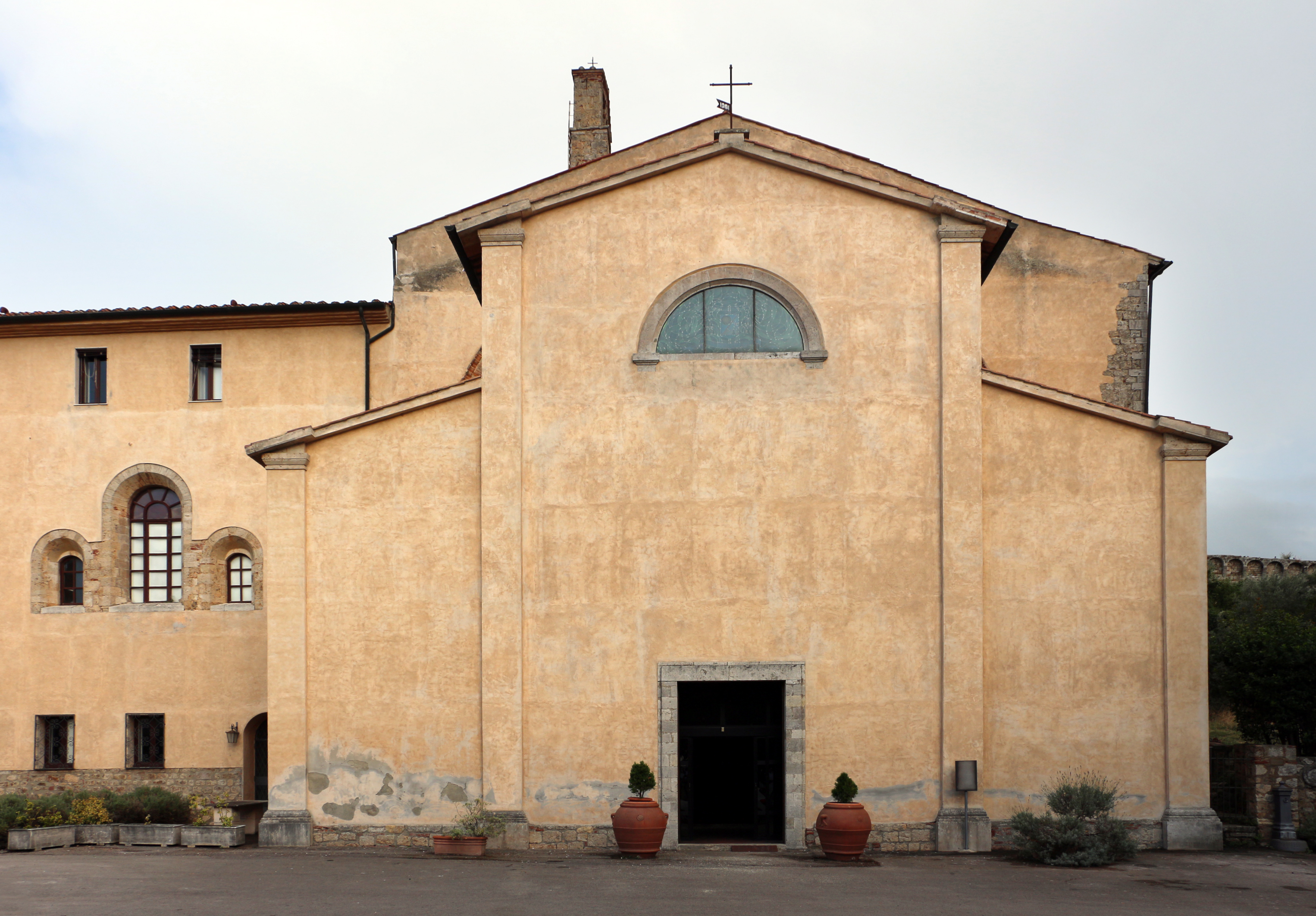
- San Francesco
- Location: Massa Marittima, Province of Grosseto, Tuscany
- Country: Italy
- Denomination: Roman Catholic

Architecture
- Functional status: Active
- Architectural type: Church and convent
- Style: Gothic architecture

San Francesco is a Roman Catholic church and former convent in Massa Marittima, Tuscany, Italy. Built in the 13th century in the Gothic style, the complex was later separated from the rest of the city following the construction of the Sienese walls in the 14th century.

Originally larger in size, the church and adjoining convent underwent a series of reductions due to unstable ground conditions. The first shortening took place during the 14th century, followed by further modifications in 1441, 1529, 1760, and 1878. A restoration completed in 1992 restored the appearance of the apse and side chapels.

The convent was suppressed in 1782 and converted into a diocesan seminary. In the early 19th century, during a temporary closure of the seminary, the building was briefly used as an elementary school before the seminary reopened in 1833.

Among the artworks preserved in the church are a 14th-century wooden crucifix, a painting by Raffaello Vanni depicting the Assumption of the Virgin, Saint Cerbonius and the Blessed of Massa Marittima, set within a wooden altar, and stained glass windows designed by Alberto Ceppi.
