= Torquato Fusi =

Italian politician (1923–2005)

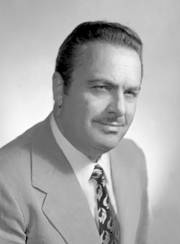

Senator of the Italian Republic
- In office 19 May 1968 – 4 July 1976

Personal details
- Born: 21 December 1923 Massa Marittima, Province of Grosseto, Kingdom of Italy
- Died: 28 October 2005 (aged 81) Siena, Tuscany, Italy
- Party: Italian Communist Party

Torquato Fusi (21 December 1923 – 28 October 2005) was an Italian politician and partisan who served as a senator of the Italian Republic from 1968 to 1976.

== Life and career ==
Born into a rural family, Fusi joined the Italian Resistance during World War II, taking part in the Garibaldi partisan formations.

After the war, he was active in trade union movements in the Maremma region, later holding leading positions within the Italian Communist Party, including local and provincial secretary roles. He also served as a municipal councillor in Grosseto.

Fusi was elected to the Italian Senate in 1968, serving two consecutive legislatures until 1976. During his parliamentary career he held several committee roles related to industry, commerce, and tourism.

After leaving parliament, he remained active in cooperative organisations and regional agricultural institutions. From 1993 until his death in 2005, he served as provincial president of the National Association of Italian Partisans (ANPI).
