= Lago dell'Accesa =

Lake in Tuscany, Italy

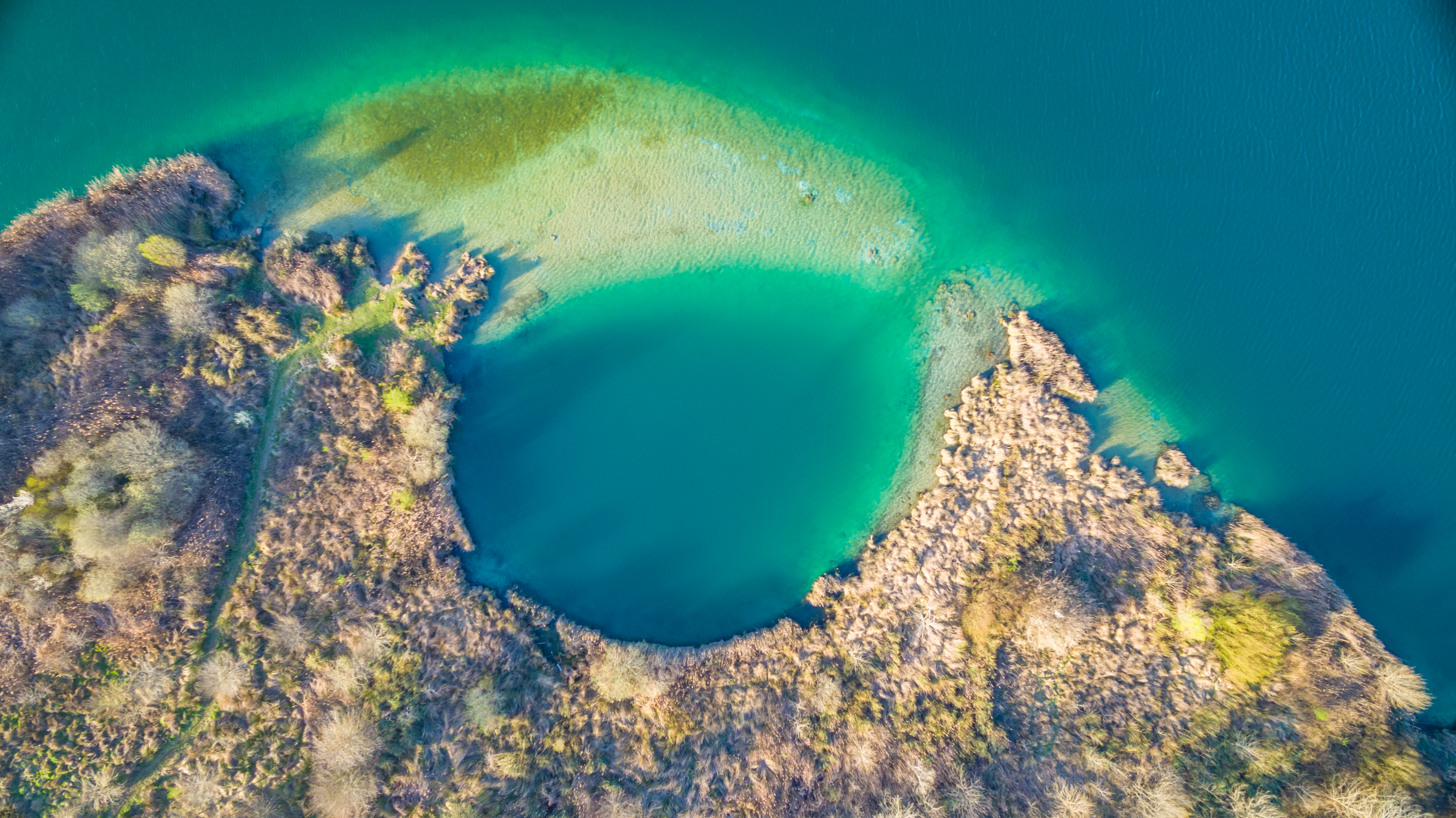
- Lago dell'Accesa, crater

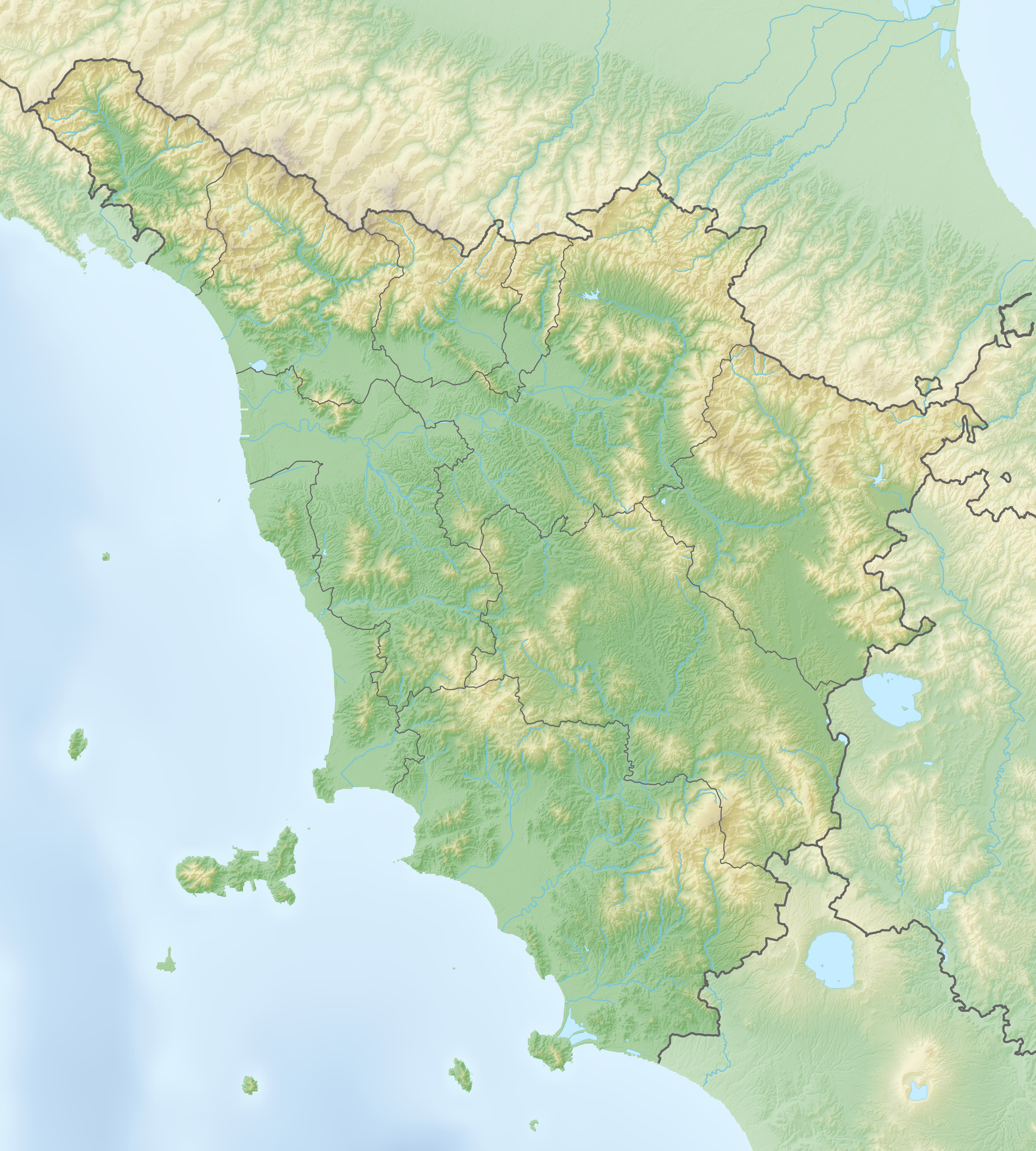
- Location within Tuscany
- Location: Massa Marittima, Province of Grosseto, Tuscany
- Coordinates: 42°59′17.70″N 10°53′43.78″E
- Primary inflows: Bruna
- Primary outflows: Bruna
- Basin countries: Italy
- Surface area: 0.14 km^{2} (0.054 sq mi)
- Surface elevation: 157 m (515 ft)

Lago dell'Accesa is a lake at Massa Marittima in the Province of Grosseto, Tuscany, Italy. At an elevation of 157 m, its surface area is 0.14 km². A number of ruins from the Etruscan civilization have been found in and around the lake.
