= Bargello (Middle Ages) =

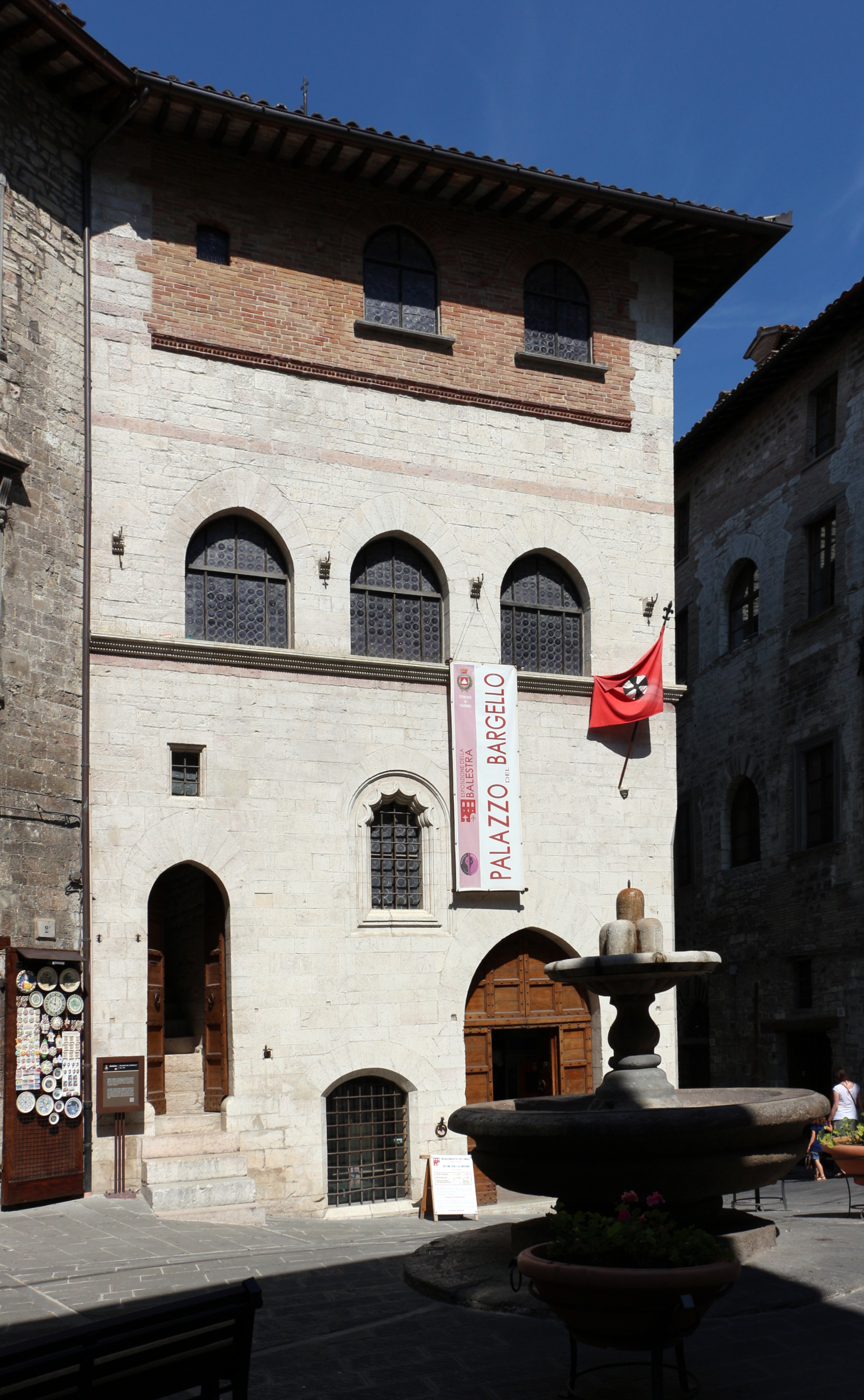
Palazzo del Bargello (Gubbio)

The term Bargello (ancient Barigello) derives from the medieval Latin barigildus, a term of Lombard origin (for the Goths bargi, for the Germans burg). Its meaning is "fortified tower" or "castle".

In the Middle Ages, bargello was the name attributed to the military captain in charge of maintaining order during periods of revolt, often having dictatorial functions as regent. The bargello, as Capitano di Giustizia or Capitano del popolo, was present in many cities of the Italian peninsula, particularly in Florence and in Rome.

The term bargello was taken by extension from the palace where the captain of justice was located and the prison where criminals were kept. In Florence the bargello was chosen among foreign people, calling them from another city, in the same way as the Podestà.

== Sources ==
- "Bargello". Enciclopedia Treccani (in Italian). Rome: Istituto dell'Enciclopedia Italiana.
- "Bargello". Dizionario di Storia (in Italian). Rome: Istituto dell'Enciclopedia Italiana. 2010.
- "Bargello". Vocabolario (in Italian). Rome: Istituto dell'Enciclopedia Italiana.
- Ottorino Pianigiani. "Bargello". Vocabolario Etimologico della Lingua Italiana di (in Italian).
- Gigli, Laura (1990). Guide rionali di Roma (in Italian). Vol. Borgo (I). Roma: Fratelli Palombi Editori. ISSN 0393-2710.
