= Liceo Torquato Tasso =

Coordinates: 41.9100°N 12.4958°E

Liceo Torquato Tasso Liceo ginnasio Torquato Tasso
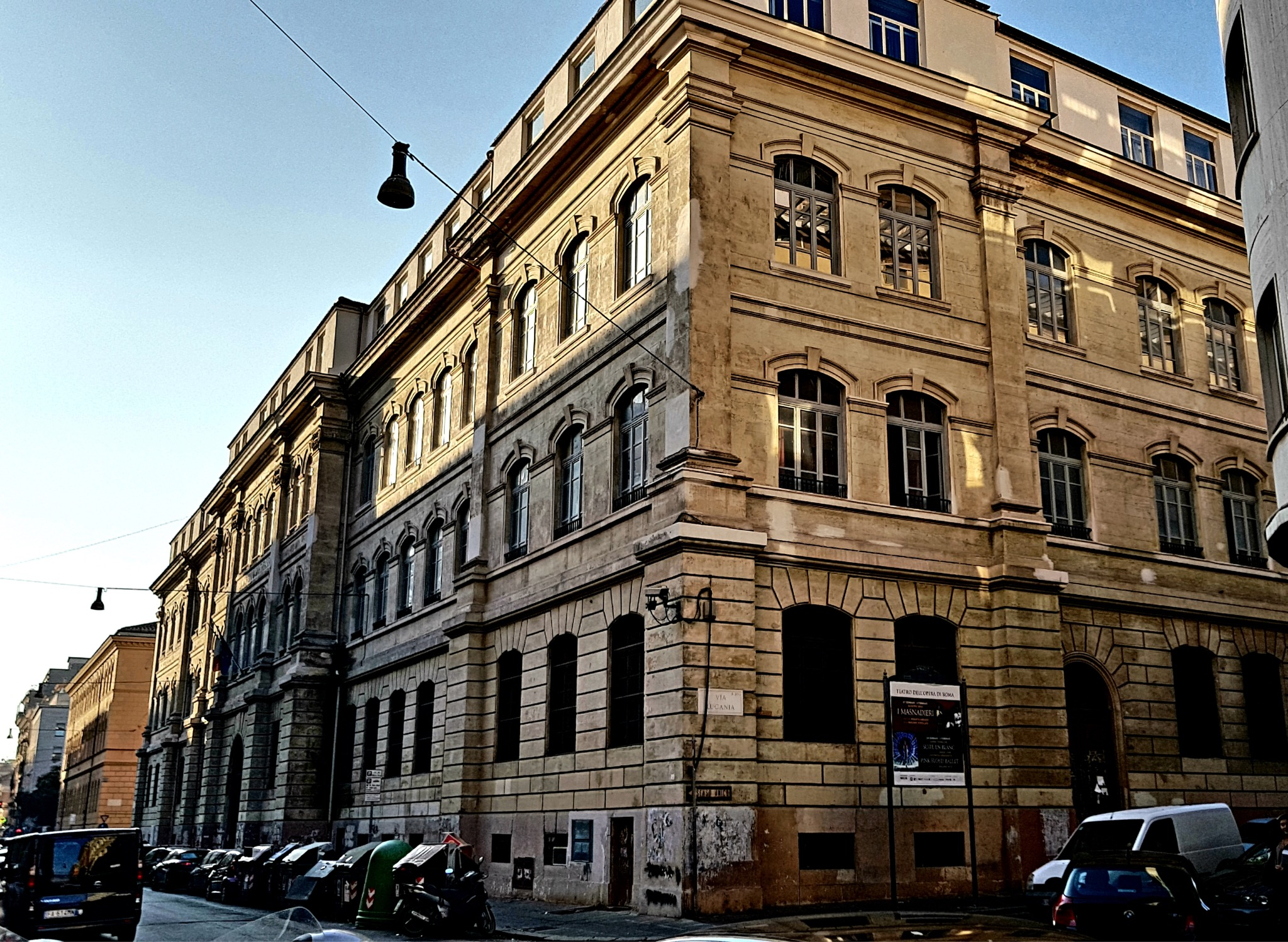

Location
- via Sicilia, 168; Rome; Italy

Information
- Established: 1887
- Website: https://www.liceotasso.edu.it/

The Liceo Torquato Tasso, better known as Liceo Tasso, is one of the oldest secondary schools in Rome, Italy.
