= Massa Marittima =

- Comune
- Comune di Massa Marittima
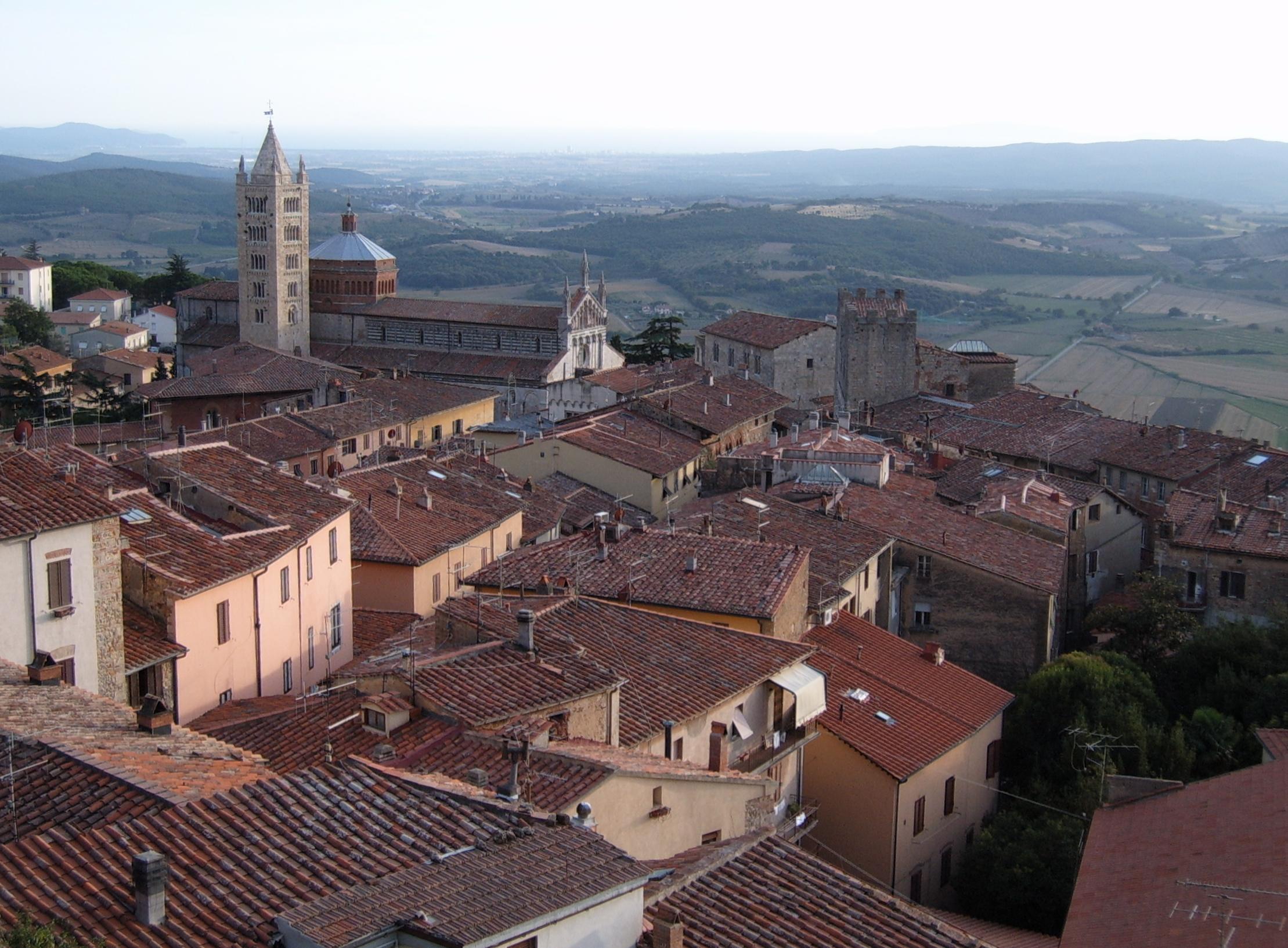

- Coat of arms

- Location within Italy Location within Tuscany
- Coordinates: 43°03′00″N 10°53′37″E
- Country: Italy
- Region: Tuscany
- Province: Grosseto (GR)
- Frazioni: Ghirlanda, Niccioleta, Prata, Tatti, Valpiana

Government
  - Mayor: Irene Marconi

Area
  - Total: 283.73 km^{2} (109.55 sq mi)
- Elevation: 380 m (1,250 ft)

Population (31 December 2017)
  - Total: 8,286
  - Density: 29.20/km^{2} (75.64/sq mi)
- Demonym: Massetani
- Time zone: UTC+1 (CET)
  - Summer (DST): UTC+2 (CEST)
- Postal code: 58024
- Dialing code: 0566
- Patron saint: Saint Cerbonius
- Saint day: October 10
- Website: Official website

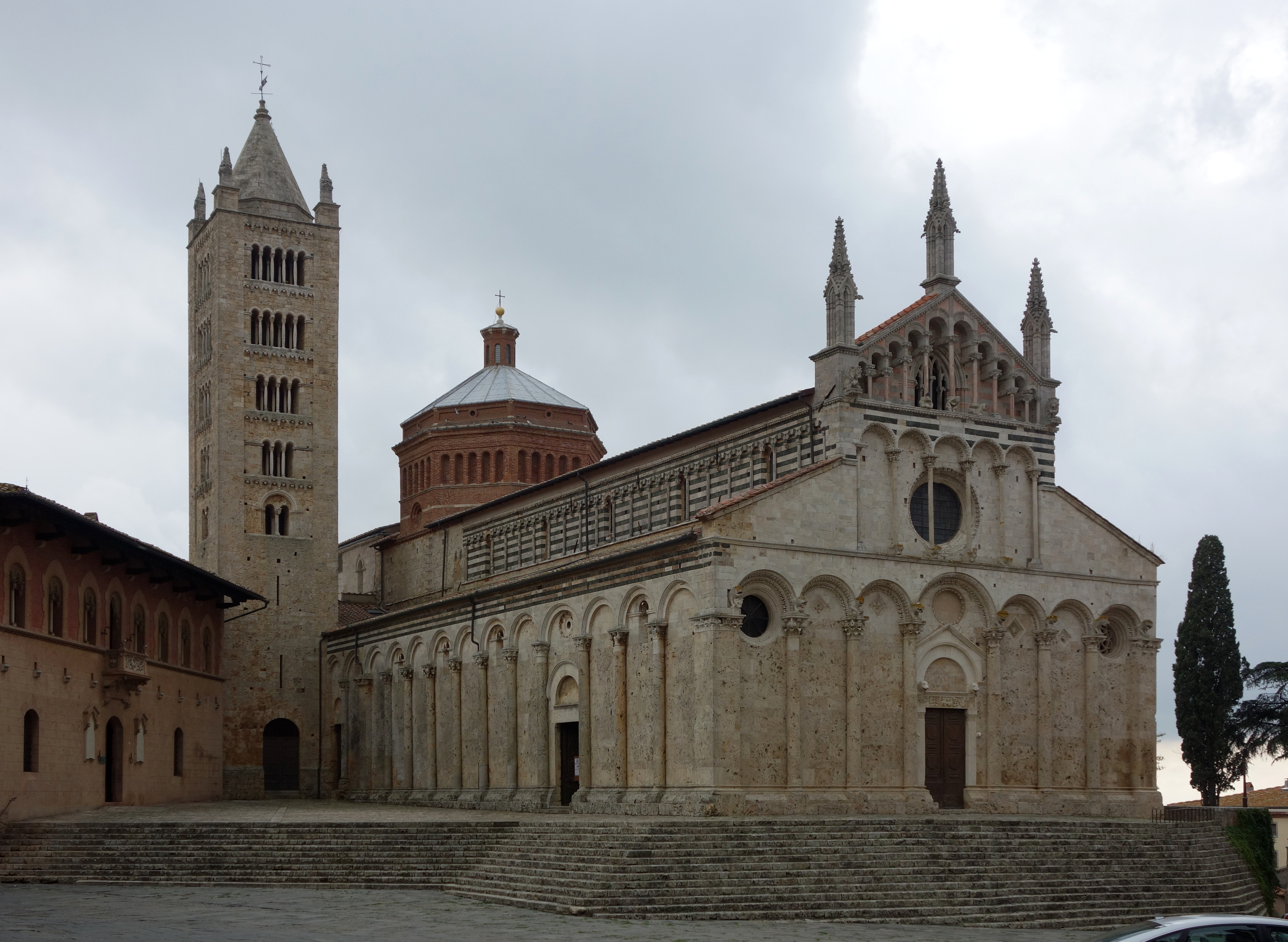
Massa Marittima Cathedral

Massa Marittima (Latin: Massa Veternensis) is a town and comune of the province of Grosseto, southern Tuscany, Italy, 49 km NNW of Grosseto.

There are mineral springs, mines of iron, mercury, lignite and copper, with foundries, ironworks and olive-oil mills. In Follonica, on the coast, there are furnaces where the iron ore of Elba is smelted.

== History ==
The territory around Massa Marittima was inhabited since prehistoric and proto-historical times, as evidenced by numerous finds dating from the Paleolithic to the Bronze Age. Etruscan settlements have been found in the area of Lake of Accesa and others dating from the 9th to the 5th century BC. Further proof of the existence of a settlement in the place where Massa Marittima is now comes from the Res Gestae by Ammianus Marcellinus, where a Massa Veternensis is cited as the birthplace of Constantius Gallus, nephew of Constantine; this town can be identified with the village of Massa Vecchia.

The name Massa appears for the first time in a document of the 10th century AD on a list of castles and courts sold to the cleric Ropprando by Lambert, Margrave of Tuscany, on April 18, 973 and subsequently repaired by Ermengarda, widow of Lambert, on February 15, 986. In the 11th century began the gradual transfer to Massa Marittima of the episcopal seat of Populonia, which had been looted by pirates and destroyed by the fleet of Nicetas, Prefect of Constantinople: a letter from Pope Alexander II to Bishop Tegrin of 1062 testifies the transfer of the bishopric to Massa. The city reached the peak of its splendor in the years when it became free commune (1255-1337), with a great urban expansion including buildings still visible today. From May 1, 1317, for a period of at least a year, the city also had its own currency. Massa fought alongside Siena in the battle of Montaperti (1260), and in three leagues (1276, 1307, 1319), subsequently being subjugated by it in 1335.

The Sienese exploited the economic potential of the city, weakening it substantially. Plagues (the most severe in 1348 and 1400) and demographic downturn brought the city into a steep decline, as Siena did not perform any reclamation works in the whole Maremma. In 1554, during the war between the Republic of Siena and Duke Cosimo de' Medici, the Massa fortress capitulated, besieged by the Spaniards led by Carlo Gonzaga. On February 3, 1555 the city was incorporated into the Grand Duchy of Tuscany.

During the Medici rule, the city experienced an initial attempt of recovery by Grand Duke Ferdinando I, but none of its successors showed interest in the fate of Massa and Maremma: the only interventions were related to Valpiana's ironworks. Malaria hit the city and in 1737, when the Medici family disappeared, Massa counted only 527 inhabitants. In the 18th century, under the Lorraine dynasty, the city recovered. On March 18, 1766 Grand Duke Peter Leopold divided the Sienese state into two provinces: the upper province and the lower province. The lower province was divided into four captaincies: Grosseto, Arcidosso, Sovana and Massa. In the years between 1770 and 1790, several areas around the city were reclaimed. Leopold II, in the 19th century, continued the works of environmental and economic improvement: the Montebamboli lignite mine and that of alum in Montioni, were reopened and Massa returned to be a mining town.

Massa actively participated in the Risorgimento movements that led to the unification of Italy. Giuseppe Garibaldi himself went to Massa Marittima, and later became an honorary citizen; some young Massetans helped him to reach Cala Martina to embark at Porto Venere in September 1849. In 1923 Follonica, which had always been a hamlet of Massa Marittima, became an autonomous municipality. During World War II, Massa was a centre of partisan activities, and several of its citizens were killed by German and Italian troops in retaliation.

In the post-war period, Massa Marittima consolidated as a mining center until the last mine closed in 1994. Today, the city mainly lives in tourism, thanks to the presence of numerous works of art and the valorization of ancient crafts, mainly linked to its minerary past.

== Government ==
=== Frazioni ===
The municipality is formed by the municipal seat of Massa Marittima and the villages (frazioni) of: Ghirlanda, Niccioleta, Prata, Tatti and Valpiana. Tha small hamlet of Montebamboli is also included in the municipality.

=== List of mayors ===
| Mayor | Term start | Term end | Party | Ref. |
|---|---|---|---|---|
| Renato Bolognini | 12 July 1985 | 24 April 1995 | PCI / PDS | |
| Luca Sani | 24 April 1995 | 14 June 2004 | PDS / DS | |
| Lidia Bai | 14 June 2004 | 26 May 2014 | DS / PD | |
| Marcello Giuntini | 26 May 2014 | 10 June 2024 | PD | |
| Irene Marconi | 10 June 2024 | Incumbent | PD | |

== Main sights ==
- The 13th century Saint Cerbonius Cathedral (13th century). The church is in Romanesque-Pisane style, and is on the Latin cross plan, with a nave and two aisles divided by cruciform pilasters and cylindrical columns. The central portal has lion sculptures and five panels with stories of Saint Cerbonius, to whom the cathedral is dedicated. The rose window has a rare 14th century glass with the Redeemer in Glory and Histories of St. Cerbonius. The interior is home to a Romanesque font (1267 with a cover of 1447), a Gothic reliquary (1324) of Saint Cerbonius, a Maestà attributed to Duccio di Buoninsegna (1316) and 14th-century fresco under which is a Roman sarcophagus from the 4th century AD.
- The battlemented Palazzo Pretorio. It houses the Archaeological Museum, containing a work by Ambrogio Lorenzetti.
- The Cassero Senese (Sienese Fortress), built in the 13th–14th centuries.
- Monteregio Castle, built by the Aldobrandeschi in the 9th century, later used as the bishops' residence.
- Church of St. Francis, founded, according to the tradition, by the saint himself in Gothic style. It houses an Assumption by Raffaello Vanni.
- Fonti dell'Abbondanza, of the 13th century, the end point of a water supply project. This palazzo features a unique fresco of a phallus tree, dubbed The Fertility Tree after its discovery in 2000.
- Former church and convent of San Pietro all'Orto
- Church of St. Augustine (14th century)
- Palazzo del Podestà.
- Palazzo delle Armi, in Renaissance style.
- Church of San Rocco (15th century).
- Native house of San Bernardino da Siena.

In the frazione of Prata are a medieval castle with two towers and the Pieve of Santa Maria Assunta. The walled borough of Tatti includes the medieval church of San Sebastiano and another Cassero.

== Notable people ==
- Constantius Gallus possibly the birthplace of the late 4th century Roman emperor.
- Bernardino of Siena (1380 – 1444), Catholic priest and saint
- Gaetano Badii (1867 – 1937), historian
- Umberto Tombari (1900 – 1984), civil engineer
- Corrado Banchi (1912 – 1999), photographer
- Norma Pratelli Parenti (1921 – 1944), partisan
- Torquato Fusi (1923 – 2005), politician
- Umberto Lenzi (1931 – 2017), film director and screenwriter
- Luciano Tovoli (born 1936), cinematographer and filmmaker
- Gabriele Bellettini (1943 – 2022), politician
- Arianna Acuti (born 1996), footballer

== Transports ==
The town was connected to Follonica by a private railway, used for both freight traffic related to the area's mines and local passenger traffic. Inaugurated in 1902 and damaged by the war in 1944, it was declared defunct in 1948. Within the territory of Massa Marittima, there were four railway stations:

- Massa Marittima railway station
- Schiantapetto railway station
- Valpiana railway station
- Cura Nuova railway station
