= Norma Pratelli Parenti =

Italian partisan

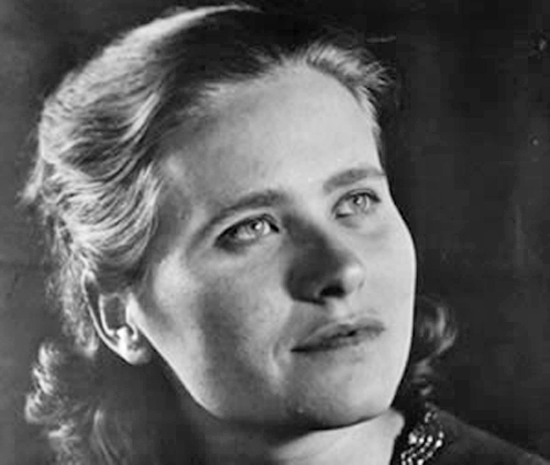
- Picture of Norma Pratelli Parenti
- Born: 1 June 1921; Monterotondo Marittimo
- Died: 23 June 1944 (aged 23); Massa Marittima
- Occupation: Partisan
- Awards: Gold Medal of Military Valor

Norma Pratelli Parenti (1 June 1921 – 23 June 1944) was an Italian partisan, honored with a gold medal for military valor (in memory).

== Biography ==
Norma was born in the Podere "Zuccantine di Sopra" area, located today in Monterotondo Marittimo but then the Municipality of Massa Marittima, daughter of Estewan and Roma Camerini. In her adult life, she joined the semi-clandestine organization called Azione Cattolica, joining the Circolo of "Santa Giovanna D'Arco" operating inside the hospice "S.Chiara".

Starting from 1941, she resided for a year in the spiritual retreat of Villa SantaRegina in Siena, and in March 1942 in the Compagnia delle figlie dimesse di S. Angela Merici with the intent to join them, but then she abandoned this. In fact, in the summer of 1942, having already moved to Massa Marittima, she became engaged to Mario Pratelli, from Agordo, whom she married on 31 March 1943 and on 29 December of the same year, Alberto Mario Pratelli was born, the only son of Norma and Mario.

After the Armistice of Cassibile, she actively participated in the Italian Liberation War, in the ranks of the Grosseto's Resistance as a partisan in the "Amiata" Group of the 23rd Garibaldi Brigade, collecting money and aid for the partisans, hosting the fugitives, hosting former Allied prisoners, procuring arms and munitions and personally participating in various war actions.

In a trattoria in Massa Marittima, managed by her mother, Norma led to desertion many foreign war prisoners to join the partisan gangs. It was one of these prisoners, a Mongolian soldier, who betrayed Norma, leading to her arrest together with her mother on the evening of 22 June 1944.

After being fiercely tortured, Norma Pratelli Parenti was shot the same evening by the retreating German troops. Her torn body was found the next day. It was decreed that the Gold Medal of Military Valour would be dedicated to her memory.

== Dedications ==
A primary school of Populonia has been entitled with her name, while there are many streets named after her in Massa Marittima, Grosseto, Follonica, Piombino, Rome, and Fizzonasco. The song "Norma, per non dimenticare" has been recorded by the choir "Le Donne di Magliano" and is one of the tracks of the cd "Donne che cantano le Donne" (2017)

== Honors ==
Decorated with a Gold Medal of Military Valour.
«Young bride and mother, between massacres and persecutions, while German and Fascist anger raged on the Maremma coast, she did not give rest to her body nor did she bend her will as a rescuer, animator, fighter and martyr. She gave the victims the forbidden burial, provided hospitality to the fugitives, freedom and salvation to the prisoners, munitions and food to the partisans and in the days of terror, when fear closed all doors and made the streets deserted, with an intrepid pity she gave courage to fearful people and increased confidence to the strongest ones. On the night of June 22nd, brought out of her home, tortured by the ferocious bestiality of her executioners, she died, a sublime offering to the Fatherland, a generous soul.»
– Massa Marittima, June 1944.

== Bibliography ==
- Riccardo Bicicchi (regia di), Il terzo giorno d'estate, docufilm, 2014.
- Cocolli, Antonella; Pagni, Susanna; Tiezzi, Annarita (2014). Edizioni Effigi (ed.). Norma Parenti partigiana maremmana medaglia d'oro al v.m. (1921-1944): testimonianze e memorie. Arcidosso (Grosseto). ISBN 978-88-6433-411-0.
- Michelucci, Riccardo; Bonino, Emma (2013). Odoya edizioni (ed.). L'eredità di Antigone. Storie di donne martiri per la libertà. Bologna. p. 288. ISBN 978-88-6288-180-7.
- Salvini, Elisabetta (2013). Franco Angeli s.r.l. (ed.). Ada e le altre. Donne cattoliche tra fascismo e democrazia. Milano. ISBN 978-8-89170-039-1.
- Zani, Denise (2015). RCS Corriere della Sera (ed.). La Resistenza di Norma. Milano. ISBN 978-8-86126-848-7.
- "Norma Pratelli Parenti - Cerca con Google".
- Zani, Denise (2015-07-28). La Resistenza di Norma. Corriere della Sera. ISBN 978-88-6126-848-7.
- Rossini, Ilenia (2016-08-04). Un fiore che non muore: La voce delle donne nella Resistenza italiana. Red Star Press. ISBN 978-88-6718-139-1.
- Salvini, Elisabetta (2013-11-08). Ada e le altre. Donne cattoliche tra fascismo e democrazia: Donne cattoliche tra fascismo e democrazia. FrancoAngeli. ISBN 978-88-917-0039-1.
- Caprioli, Maura Piccialuti (1976). Radio Londra, 1940-1945: inventario delle trasmissioni per l'Italia. Ministero per i beni culturali ed ambientali.
- Taddei, Katia (2003). Coro di voci sole: raccolta di testimonianze orali sulla strage dei minatori della Niccioleta, 13-14 giugno 1944. Il ponte. ISBN 978-88-88861-09-8.
- Martelli, Pier Nello (1978). "La Resistenza nell'alta Maremma: drammi, contrasti, passioni politiche e ... - Pier Nello Martelli - Google Libri".

=== Magazine ===
- Riccardo Michelucci, Norma come Antigone contro i nazifascisti, Avvenire, Roma, 16 marzo 2013.
