= Montebamboli =

- Località
- Location within Italy
- Coordinates: 43°04′37″N 10°48′38″E
- Country: Italy
- Region: Tuscany
- Province: Grosseto (GR)
- Comune: Massa Marittima
- Postal code: 58024
- Dialing code: 0566

Montebamboli is a hamlet and località in the comune of Massa Marittima, Tuscany, Italy. The settlement was first mentioned in a parchment from the year 754, and it is located in the hills of what is now the centre of Massa Marittima, within the Parco interprovinciale di Montioni. The hamlet is one of the few still preserved in its original state in the area, containing about twenty farms and a complex centred on the historic Petrocchi farm dating to the early 19th century, which still has its old wine cellar and olive press. There is a church dedicated to St. Francis and St. Louis, dating to the late 18th century.

On a hill near the village are the ruins of Tricase Castle, consisting of the perimeter wall and some interior walls. In addition to the cited document dated 754, the castle is mentioned in a document dating from 1316, which lists it as a property of the Sienese noble family of Sergardi.

Montebamboli is also known for its high-quality lignite coal, located along the river Riotorto. Lignite was mined in the area by various companies between the discovery of deposits in 1839 and 1921. The extracted lignite was transported to the sea at a place near Torre Mozza (today the village of La Carbonifera), by a dedicated 22 km (14 mi) railway completed in 1849.

A number of fossil species have been discovered in the lignite beds around Montebamboli, including the first fossils of the hominid species Oreopithecus bambolii, and the unusual waterfowl species Bambolinetta lignitifila, both of these species named after the settlement.
