= List of members of the Regional Council of Tuscany, 1970–1975 =

The I Legislature of the Regional Council of Tuscany, the legislative assembly of Tuscany, was inaugurated following the 1970 regional election, held on 6–7 June 1970.

Elio Gabbuggiani (PCI) served as president of the Regional Council. The head of the Regional Government was Lelio Lagorio (PSI), who served as president of Tuscany.

== Members ==
- Camillo Andreoni
- Giordano Angiolini
- Fidia Arata
- Nello Balestracci
- Giovanni Barbagli
- Carlo Barsanti
- Ildo Barsanti
- Giulio Battistini
- Avio Betas (until 29 March 1972, deceased)
  - Athos Fiordelli (since 14 April 1972)
- Dino Oliviero Bigini
- Guido Biondi
- Tommaso Bisagno
- Ivo Butini
- Antonio Catelli
- Guglielmo Cini
- Renzo Cipolla
- Ilia Coppi Ugoletti
- Sergio Costa
- Riccardo Degl'Innocenti
- Africo Dondolini
- Vittorio Fabrizi
- Lino Federigi
- Silvano Filippelli
- Gino Filippini
- Elio Gabbuggiani
- Giulio Gacci (until 18 October 1971, deceased)
  - Ottone Magistrali (since 11 November 1971)
- Corrado Gelli
- Rodolfo Giovannelli
- Mauro Giovannini
- Lelio Lagorio
- Dino Lugetti (until 8 September 1971)
  - Franco Consani (since 8 September 1971)
- Luciano Lusvardi
- Walter Malvezzi
- Giuseppe Matulli
- Pietro Mazzocca
- Leonetto Melani
- Loretta Montemaggi
- Giorgio Mori
- Antonio Palandri
- Marino Papucci
- Ugo Pasqualetti
- Silvano Peruzzi
- Enzo Pezzati
- Renato Pollini
- Anselmo Pucci
- Pietro Ralli
- Ubaldo Rogari
- Ilario Rosati
- Luciano Stanghellini
- Lamberto Tellini

== Executive branch ==
The Regional Government (Giunta Regionale) was elected on 28 July 1970.

Member	Party	Delegate for
Lelio Lagorio (president)	PSI	Coordination, transports and broadcasting
Walter Malvezzi (vice president)	PCI	General and institutional affairs
Guido Biondi	PSIUP	Healthcare and social welfare
Lino Federigi	PCI	Trade and tourism
Silvano Filippelli	PCI	Culture, education and sports
Gino Filippini	PCI	Urban planning and social housing
Marino Papucci	PSI	Agriculture, industry and manufacturing
Renato Pollini	PCI	Budget, finance and personnel
Anselmo Pucci	PCI	Public works and roads

== Sources ==
- Baccetti, Carlo (June 2005). "Le prime elezioni regionali in Toscana (1970 e 1975): formazione e tipologia di un nuovo ceto politico". Quaderni dell'Osservatorio Elettorale – Italian Journal of Electoral Studies. 53 (1): 5–62. doi:10.36253/qoe-12722.
