= List of presidents of the Province of Grosseto =

President of the Province of Grosseto
- Presidente della Provincia di Grosseto

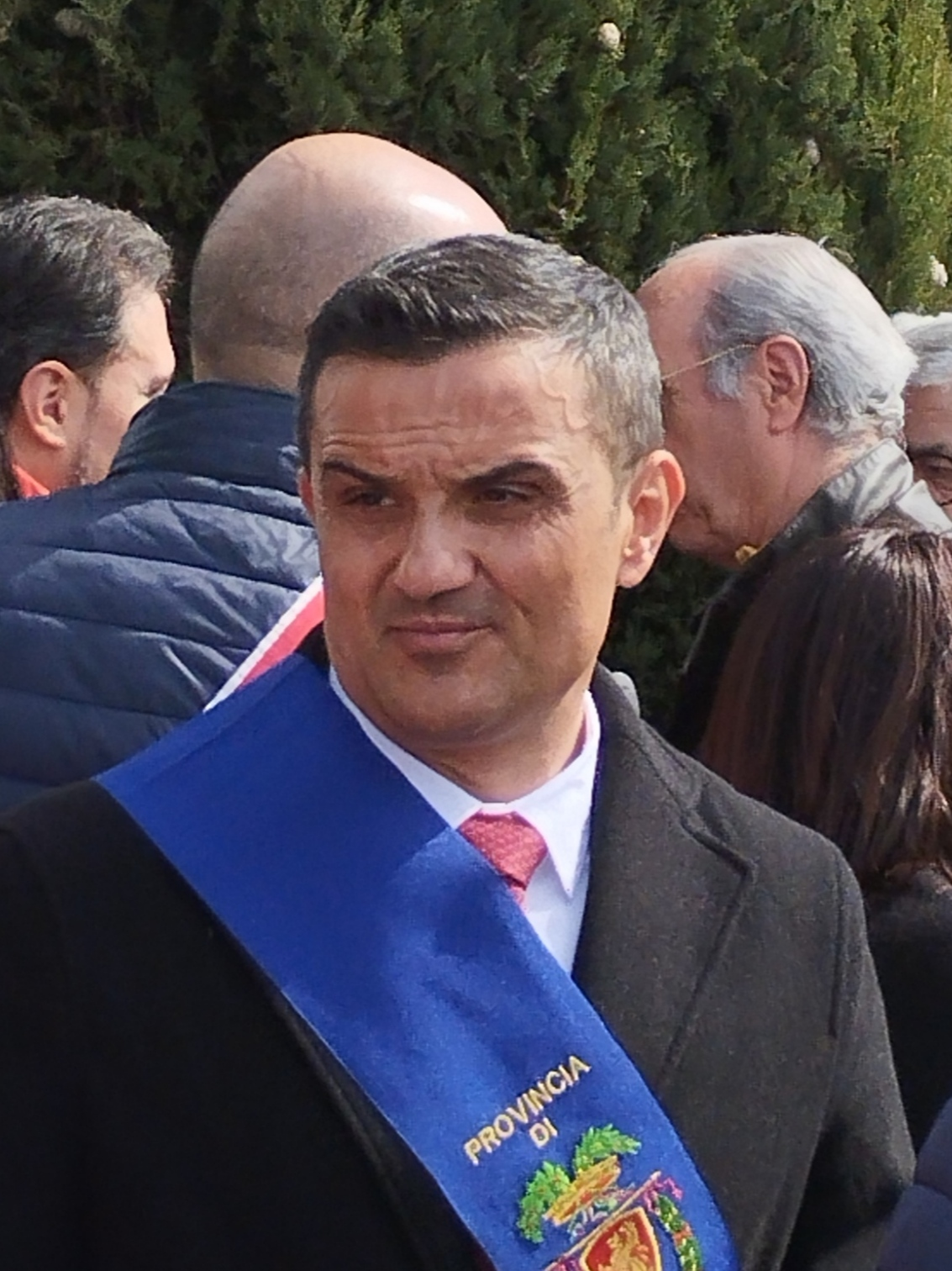
- Incumbent; Francesco Limatola since 19 December 2021
- Residence: Palazzo Aldobrandeschi
- Term length: 4 years
- Inaugural holder: Vittorio Valeri
- Formation: 1889
- Deputy: Valentino Bisconti

The president of the Province of Grosseto is the head of the provincial government in Grosseto, Tuscany, Italy. The president oversees the administration of the province, coordinates the activities of the municipalities, and represents the province in regional and national matters. The provincial government is headquartered in the Palazzo Aldobrandeschi in Grosseto, where the council chamber is located.

Since December 2019, the office has been held by Francesco Limatola of the Democratic Party.

== History ==
The Provincial Deputation was established in 1861 following the unification of Italy, serving as the executive branch of the province alongside the Provincial Council, which acts as the legislative body. Until 1889, the role of president of the deputation was held by the prefect. The first president elected in 1889 was Vittorio Valeri, who served until 1904.

During the Fascist regime (1928–1944), the Provincial Rectorate replaced the deputation, and presidents were appointed by the central government. After World War II, the Provincial Deputation was briefly reinstated (1944–1951) before the modern office of the president of the Province was established in 1951, elected by the Provincial Council.

From 1995 to 2014, the president was elected directly by the citizens of the province. Following the 2014 Delrio reform, presidents are elected by the Assembly of the mayors and municipal councillors of the province's municipalities, and the term of office was reduced from five to four years.

== List ==
=== Presidents of the Provincial Deputation (1889–1927) ===
No.	Portrait	Name	Term of office		Party
No.	Portrait	Name	Start	End	Party
1		Vittorio Valeri (1851–1904)	1889	December 1904	
2		Armando Pastorelli	December 1904	19 June 1916	
3		Arturo Pallini	19 June 1916	9 September 1920	Liberal–monarchical
–		Giuseppe Benci (acting)	9 September 1920	5 December 1920	Italian Republican Party
4		Giò Batta Santini (1875–1948)	5 December 1920	1922	Italian Socialist Party
(3)		Arturo Pallini	1922	1927	Italian Liberal Party

=== Presidents of the Provincial Rectorate (1928–1944) ===
No.	Portrait	Name	Term of office		Party
No.	Portrait	Name	Start	End	Party
1		Tullio Gaggioli (1886–19??)	December 1928	1940	National Fascist Party
2		Arturo Galli (1885–1965)	1940	1943	National Fascist Party
–		Bruno Carattoli	1943	1944	Prefectural commissioner

=== Presidents of the Provincial Deputation (1944–1951) ===
No.	Portrait	Name	Term of office		Party
No.	Portrait	Name	Start	End	Party
1		Giovanni Magrassi (1891–1969)	1944	March 1947	Italian Republican Party
2		Raffaello Bellucci (1904–1981)	April 1947	1948	Italian Communist Party
3		Dante Evangelisti	1948	8 July 1951	Italian Republican Party

=== Presidents of the Province (1951–present) ===
No.	Portrait	Name	Term of office		Party	Election
No.	Portrait	Name	Start	End	Party	Election
1		Emilio Suardi (1905–1983)	8 July 1951	27 September 1952	Italian Communist Party	1951
2		Mario Ferri (1927–1978)	27 September 1952	1956	Italian Socialist Party	1951
2		Mario Ferri (1927–1978)	1956	1960	Italian Socialist Party	1956
2		Mario Ferri (1927–1978)	1960	1964	Italian Socialist Party	1960
2		Mario Ferri (1927–1978)	1964	1967	Italian Socialist Party	1964
3		Antonio Palandri (1925–2003)	1967	1970	Italian Communist Party	1964
4		Luciano Giorgi (b. 1940)	1970	1975	Italian Socialist Party	1970
4		Luciano Giorgi (b. 1940)	1975	1980	Italian Socialist Party	1975
5		Claudio Asta (b. 1948)	12 August 1980	January 1983	Italian Socialist Party	1980
6		Fosco Monaci (1924–1997)	January 1983	May 1985	Italian Socialist Party	1980
7		Alberto Cerreti (1939–2019)	7 September 1985	14 July 1990	Italian Socialist Party	1985
8		Lamberto Ciani (b. 1949)	20 July 1990	24 April 1995	Italian Socialist Party	1990
9		Stefano Gentili (1957–2023)	8 May 1995	14 June 1999	Democratic Party of the Left	1995
10		Lio Scheggi (b. 1948)	16 June 1999	14 June 2004	Democrats of the Left	1999
10		Lio Scheggi (b. 1948)	14 June 2004	23 June 2009	Democrats of the Left; Democratic Party	2004
11		Leonardo Marras (b. 1973)	23 June 2009	14 October 2014	Democratic Party	2009
12		Emilio Bonifazi (b. 1961)	14 October 2014	19 July 2016	Democratic Party	2014
–		Andrea Benini (acting)	19 July 2016	9 January 2017	Democratic Party	2014
13		Antonfrancesco Vivarelli Colonna (b. 1969)	9 January 2017	19 December 2021	Independent (centre-right)	2017
14		Francesco Limatola (b. 1970)	19 December 2021	17 March 2026	Democratic Party	2021
14		Francesco Limatola (b. 1970)	17 March 2026	Incumbent	Democratic Party	2026

== Presidents of the Provincial Council ==
The offices of president of the Province (executive) and president of the Provincial Council (legislative) have not always coincided. Following Italian unification, the Provincial Council elected its own president, while the executive branch was exercised by the Provincial Deputation, chaired by the prefect until 1889 and thereafter by an elected president. The Provincial Council was abolished under the Fascist reforms in 1926 and re-established in 1951. From 1951 until 1995, the president of the Province also served ex officio as president of the Provincial Council. Following the 1993 reform, which took effect with the 1995 elections, the two offices were again separated. Since the implementation of the Delrio Law in 2014, which abolished the provincial executive, the president of the Province has once again served as president of the Provincial Council.

Name	Start	End	Party
Angelo Ferri	September 1862	1863	
Lorenzo Grottanelli	1863	1864	
Giovanni Morandini	1865	September 1866	
Bernardino Martinucci	1866	1867	
Angelo Ferri	1867	1874	
Gaspero Petruccioli	1875	1877	
Giovanni Morandini	1877	September 1888	
Ciro Aldi Mai	1889	1906	
Luigi Pierazzi	1906	1915	
Emilio Ginanneschi	1915	1920	
Umberto Grilli	1920	1922	PSI
Office abolished (1926–1951)
President of the Province (1951–1995)
Marcello Ranieri	25 May 1995	19 July 2004	PDS-DS
Massimo Borghi	19 July 2004	24 June 2009	DS
Sergio Martini	24 June 2009	14 October 2014	PD
President of the Province (since 2014)

== Sources ==
- Corsi, Hubert (1987). La lotta politica in Maremma 1900-1925. Rome: Cinque Lune.
- Cifelli, Alberto (2008). L'istituto prefettizio dalla caduta del fascismo all'Assemblea costituente. I Prefetti della Liberazione (PDF). Rome: Scuola Superiore dell'Amministrazione dell'Interno. Archived from the original (PDF) on 2019-09-03.
- Cappelli, Enrico (2017). Bonfiglioli, Giorgio (ed.). Grosseto. Appunti storici. Grosseto: Innocenti Editore.
- Galimi, Valeria, ed. (2018). Il fascismo a Grosseto. Figure e articolazioni del potere in provincia (1922-1938). Arcidosso: Effigi.
- Menichini, Piera (2005). "I presidenti delle Province dall'Unità alla Grande guerra: repertorio analitico". Storia Amministrazione Costituzione (13): 254–255.
