= Collegiata di San Lorenzo, Montevarchi =

Coordinates: 43°31′25″N 11°34′04″E

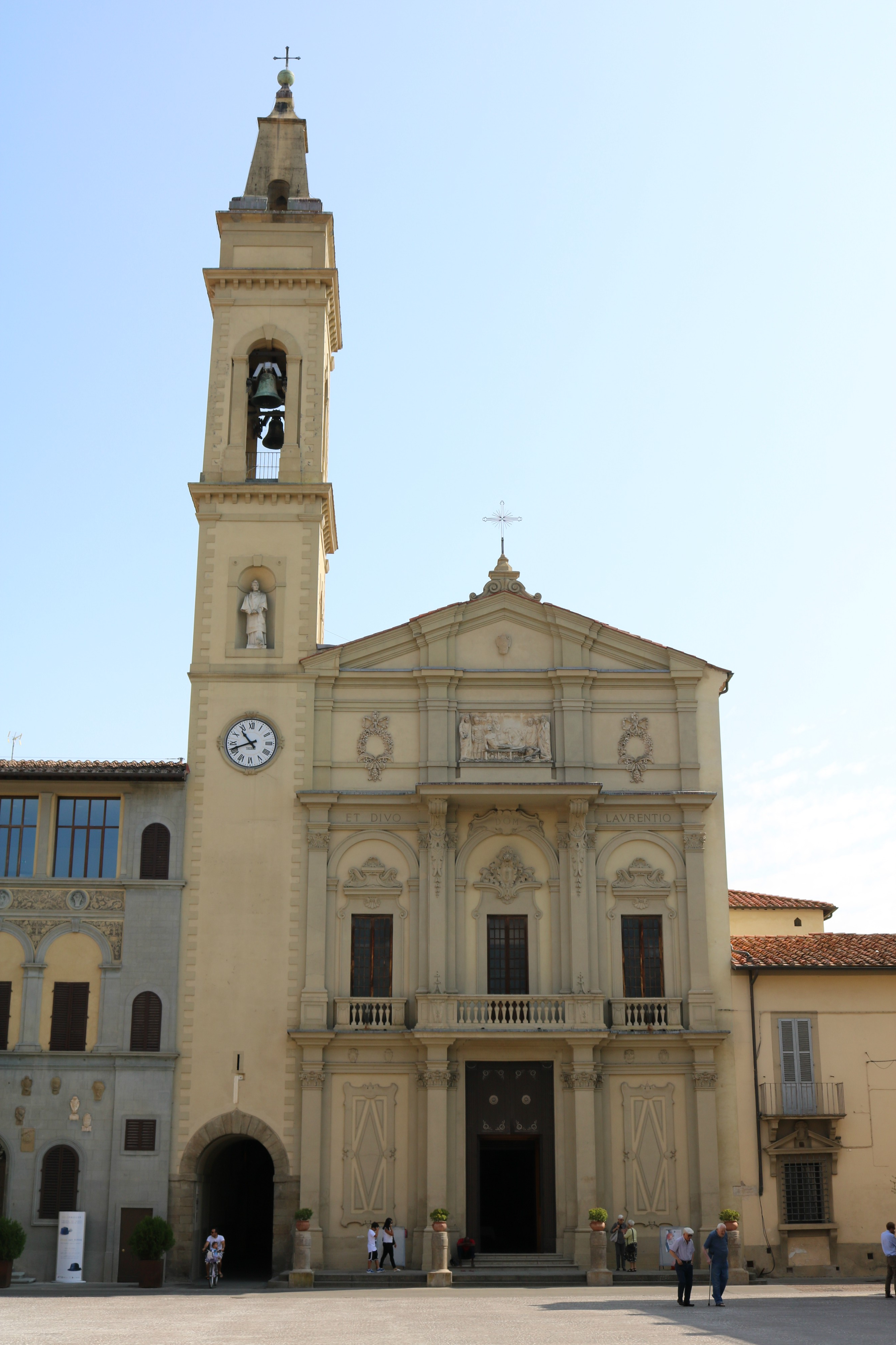
Facade of the Collegiata with bell-tower; museum is to the right of the facade.

The Insigne Collegiata di San Lorenzo (Distinguished Collegiate Church of St Lawrence) is a church in Piazza Varchi of central Montevarchi, Province of Arezzo, Tuscany, central Italy. Attached to the church is a small museum of sacred art, which includes a reconstructed chapel (tempietto) bedecked with panels by Andrea della Robbia.

== History ==
The origins of this structure and the buildings are complicated. A primitive chapel of San Lorenzo was present on a nearby hill of Poggio di Cennano, attached to the castle overlooking Montevarchi.

In the 13th century, the donations of various lords of the region led to the translation of the college of canons to the town. One partially legendary tradition is that in 1266, the Count Guido Guerra VI donated the putative relic of the Sacro Latte (holy breast milk of the Madonna). By 1283, the bas relief depicting the Martyrdom of St Lawrence had been completed. Construction of the larger church was begun in 1327, with the main altar completed in 1360. This structure however was entirely changed with the Baroque refurbishment of the church at the start of the 18th-century architect Massimiliano Soldani Benzi, who was commissioned by his brother, Angiolo Domenico, who by 1706 was serving as provost of the Collegiata.

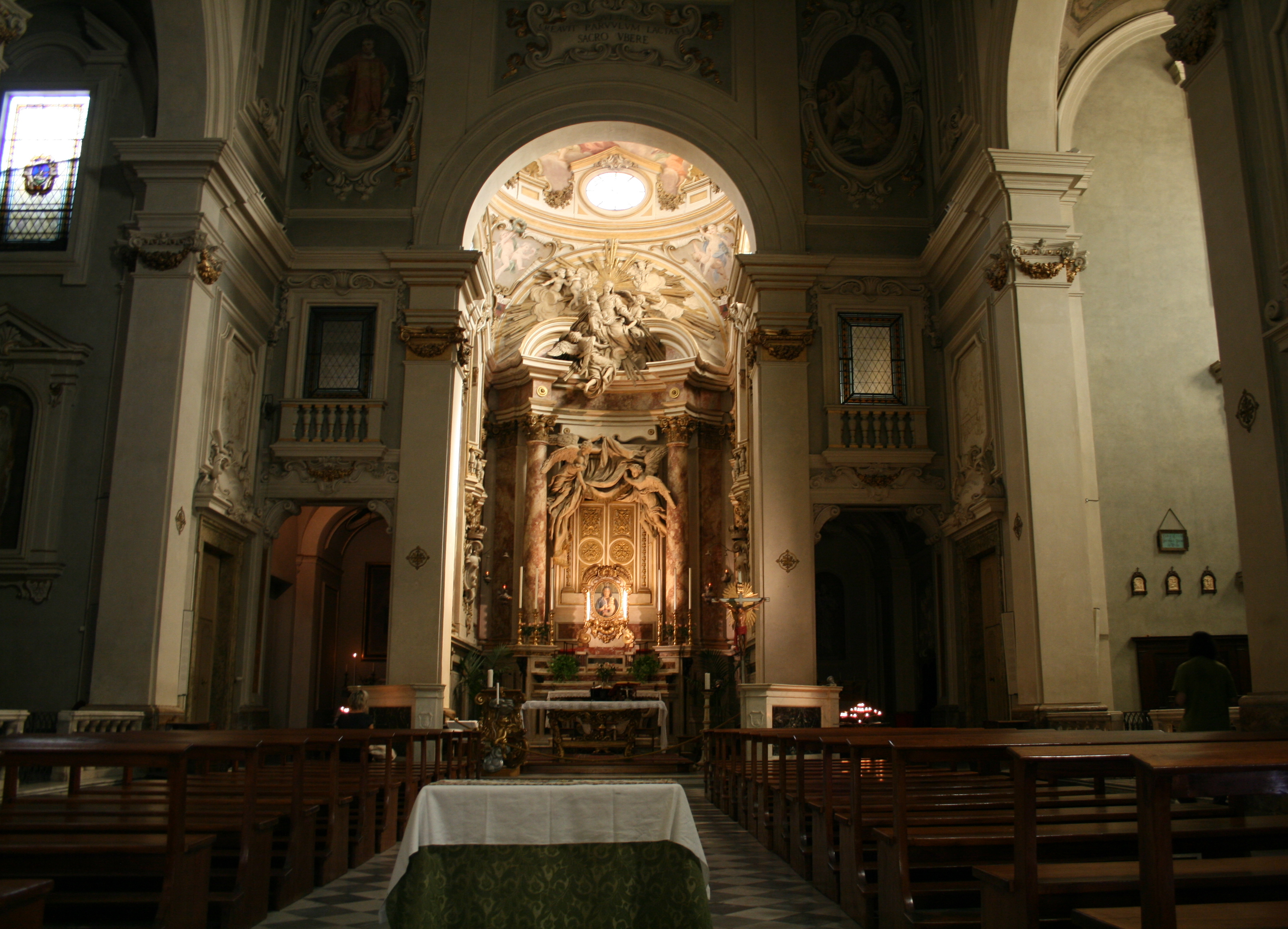
Interior view from the nave to apse

In the slender and tall 15th-century bell-tower located between the church and canonry, is a statue of St Lawrence. The interior of the church has frescoes depicting the Life of St Lawrence by Camillo Sagrestani and the dome frescoed by Matteo Bonechi, depicts the Assumption of the Virgin. Above the main altarpiece is a remarkable baroque sculpture with the Madonna and child in glory with angels, and angels opening a faux curtain made of marble by Giovanni Baratta. The church holds the remains of the blessed Maria Teresa Scrilli. One of the side altarpieces depicts the Madonna in Glory between Saints Lawrence and Macario (circa 1590) by Giovanni Balducci. Another altarpiece, translated here from the suppressed church of San Ludovico, is a depiction of the Adoration of the Magi (1610) by Matteo Rosselli.

== Museo d'Arte Sacra ==
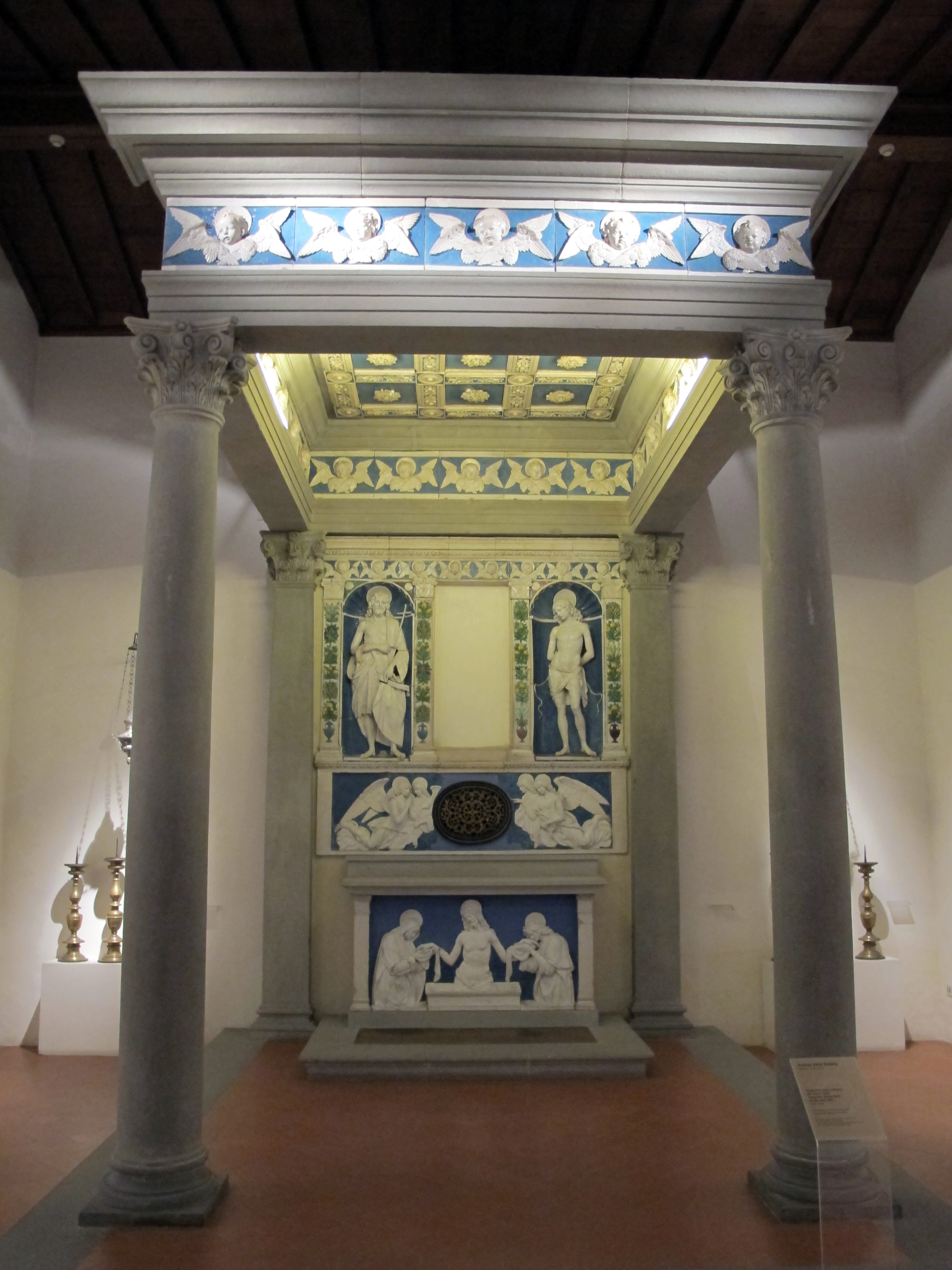
Tempietto of the Relic of the Holy Milk by Andrea della Robbia

In the museum are a number of artworks, including a stern stone relief portrait of Leo X (circa 1550); a 16th-century painted terracota depicting St Antony Abbott; and there are portions of a fresco painted by Luberto da Montevarchi depicting the Birth of Christ and an Enthroned Madonna and child. There are various reliquaries used to transport the relics of the Holy Milk during processions. But the main object on display is the reconstructed Tempietto della reliquia del sacro latte (1495–1500) by Andrea della Robbia.
