= Emilio Suardi =

Italian politician and partisan (1905–1983)

President of the Province of Grosseto
- In office 8 July 1951 – 27 September 1952
- Preceded by: Dante Evangelisti
- Succeeded by: Mario Ferri

Personal details
- Born: 1 April 1905 Romano di Lombardia, Province of Bergamo, Kingdom of Italy
- Died: 4 February 1983 (aged 77) Romano di Lombardia, Lombardy, Italy
- Party: Italian Communist Party

Emilio Suardi (1 April 1905 – 4 February 1983) was an Italian politician and partisan.

== Life and career ==
Born in Romano di Lombardia, in the province of Bergamo, in 1905, he started working at a young age as a laborer at the Breda workshops and immediately became interested in politics, joining the Italian Communist Party (PCI) in 1925.

Notoriously anti-fascist, he was fired for his beliefs in 1930 and emigrated to France, settling in Paris under a false identity. In 1936, he left for Spain as a volunteer in the Garibaldi Battalion, fighting against the Francoist regime alongside Spanish partisans on the Madrid front. He was also an instructor of the 45th division and commissioner of the XII "Garibaldi" brigade. In February 1939, he was arrested by French police during an attempt to return to Paris: released, he moved to Grenoble. When France was occupied by the Nazis, Suardi fought alongside the French Resistance, and was able to return to Italy after the fall of fascism to participate in the liberation war. As a partisan, he mainly operated in Emilia, in the Parma area, becoming a member of the Emilia-Romagna insurrectional triumvirate and political commissioner of the North Emilia Unified Military Command. During a mission in Piedmont, he fell victim to an ambush mistakenly set by the partisans from Novara, sustaining some injuries.

An active political member of the Communist Party, from June 1945 to December 1946, he was secretary of the provincial federation of Bergamo, then went on to hold institutional positions in Tuscany. In December 1947, he was appointed secretary of the PCI provincial federation of Grosseto, replacing Raffaello Bellucci, and in 1951 was elected president of the Province of Grosseto, leading the government until September 1952.

In 1954, he was transferred to Rome as a member of the party's Central Committee, where he remained until 1967. Returning to Lombardy for health reasons, he held various positions for the party at the local level. He died in his hometown on 4 February 1983.

== Sources ==
- La formazione del partito comunista in Toscana. Florence: Istituto Gramsci. 1981.
- Franco Andreucci; Alessandra Pescarolo (1989). Gli spazi del potere. Aree, regioni, Stati: le coordinate territoriali della storia contemporanea. Florence: Usher.
- Ettore Rotelli, ed. (1981). La ricostruzione in Toscana dal CLN ai partiti. I partiti politici. Vol. II. Bologna: Il Mulino.

Political offices
Preceded by Dante Evangelisti	President of the Province of Grosseto; 1951–1952	Succeeded by Mario Ferri
