= Felice Platone =

Italian politician

Felice "Gamba" Platone
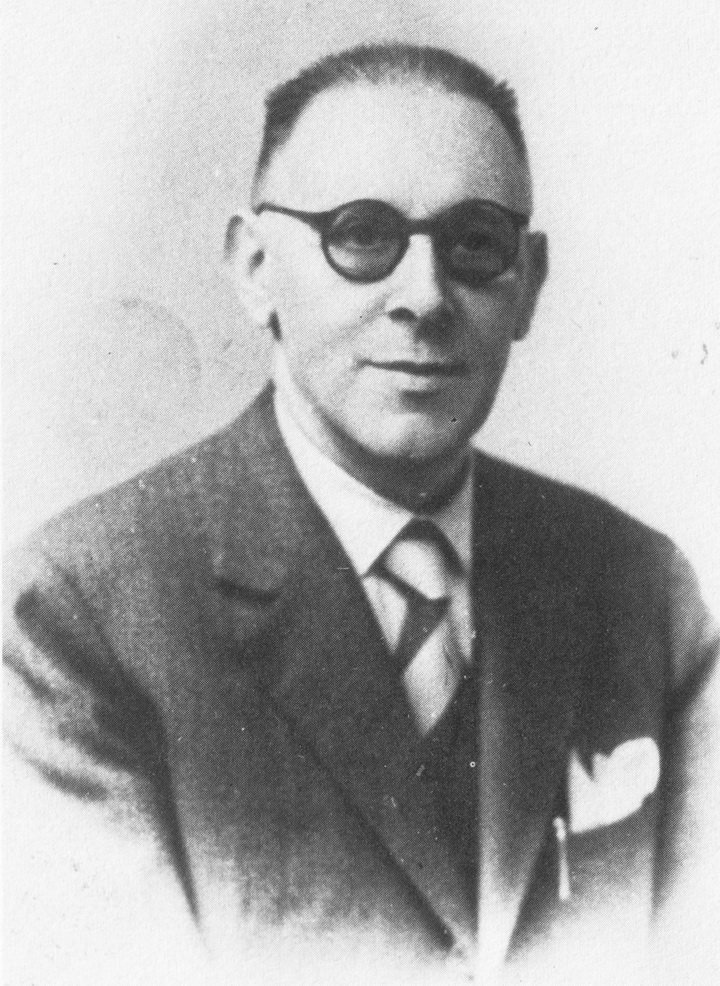
- Felice Platone in 1962
- Born: Felice Platone; Rignano Flaminio, Italy
- Died: 8 October 1962 (aged 66)
- Occupation(s): Lawyer, Politician

Mayor of Asti
- In office 1945–1951

Constituent Assembly of Italy
- In office 1946–1948

Italian Senate
- In office 1948–1953

Felice Platone (born 11 January 1896 in Rignano Flaminio, Italy, d. 8 October 1962 in Asti, Italy) was an Italian politician, partisan and lawyer. He earned a laurea di giurisprudenza (equivalent to an LL.B.) at the University of Turin Department of Law.

Mobilized during both World War I and World War II, Platone, known by his nom de guerre "Gamba" during and after the Second World War Italian resistance movement, was discharged with the rank of major of artillery. During the 18-year Mussolini dictatorship, the legal profession did not hinder Platone from performing clandestine anti-fascist activities. Not surprisingly, immediately after the 1943 Armistice of Cassibile, "Gamba" was among the organizers of the Asti Resistance.

A member of the anti-fascist National Liberation Committee, Platone served as mayor of Asti (1945–1951) after Italian liberation. He was a Communist (PCI) member of the Constituent Assembly of Italy from 25 June 1946 to 31 January 1948, and from 8 May 1948 until 24 June 1953, he was a member of the Italian Senate.

Platone was credited with implementing a coherent plan for the city's postwar reorganization and enhancement of its cultural traditions through public works programs and improving conditions for the lower classes in health care, welfare, education and the supply of basic necessities. After a September 1948 flood and subsequent storm in the Piedmont region, he led an immediate emergency response and secured city council approval of a recovery plan for the most hard-hit neighbourhoods. Platone also supported cultural institutions and arranged a 1949 celebration of the bicentenary of the birth of Italian poet and dramatist Vittorio Alfieri, who had been a native of Asti.

== Honours ==
On 24 April 2015, the Sala Consiliare (council chamber) of Asti's city hall was formally named in honour of Felice Platone. Dignitaries present at the renaming ceremony included Mayor Fabrizio Brignolo, Deputy Mayor David Arri and Counc. Maria Bagnadentro, as well as surviving members of the ANPI.
