= Roberto Vasai =

Italian politician (born 1951)

President of the Province of Arezzo
- In office 23 June 2009 – 31 October 2018
- Preceded by: Vincenzo Ceccarelli
- Succeeded by: Silvia Chiassai Martini

Mayor of Pergine Valdarno
- In office 1975 – 24 April 1995
- Succeeded by: Massimo Palazzeschi

Personal details
- Born: 10 July 1951 (age 75) Montevarchi, Province of Arezzo, Italy
- Party: Democratic Party (since 2007); Previously: Italian Communist Party; Democratic Party of the Left; Democrats of the Left
- Profession: Railway worker

Roberto Vasai (born 10 July 1951) is an Italian politician who served as president of the Province of Arezzo from 2009 to 2018.

== Life and career ==
Vasai worked as a railway employee and served four terms as mayor of Pergine Valdarno from 1975 to 1995, representing the Italian Communist Party. In 1995, he was elected to the Provincial Council of Arezzo. From 1999 to 2009, he served as an assessor in the provincial governments led by Vincenzo Ceccarelli, holding responsibility for agriculture, hunting, fishing and sports.

In 2009, Vasai won the Democratic Party primary to become its candidate for president of the Province of Arezzo, defeating Gilberto Dindalini. In the June 2009 election, he was elected president after winning the runoff with 60.65% of the vote against centre-right candidate Lucia Tanti, who received 39.35%.

Vasai was confirmed as president in 2014 following the Delrio reform. He remained in office until October 2018.
