= Alberto Cerreti =

Italian politician (1939–2019)

Mayor of Sorano
- In office 1972–1980
- Succeeded by: Ermanno Benocci

President of the Province of Grosseto
- In office 7 September 1985 – 14 July 1990
- Preceded by: Fosco Monaci
- Succeeded by: Lamberto Ciani

Personal details
- Born: 7 February 1939 Sorano, Province of Grosseto, Kingdom of Italy
- Died: 7 September 2019 (aged 80) Montevarchi, Tuscany, Italy
- Party: Italian Socialist Party
- Occupation: teacher

Alberto Cerreti (7 February 1939 – 7 September 2019) was an Italian politician.

He served as Mayor of Sorano, Tuscany from 1972 to 1980. He was elected President of the Province of Grosseto on 7 September 1985, leading the provincial government until July 1990.

== Life and career ==
Born in Sorano in 1939, he graduated in geology and was a teacher and then principal at the local "Manfredo Vanni" institute. He entered politics in his municipality, where he was elected councilor for the Italian Socialist Party. From 1972 to 1980, he served as mayor of Sorano.

Following the provincial elections of 1985, he was elected president of the Province of Grosseto, leading a government formed by the socialists and the Italian Communist Party. After his term ended, he ran in the 1990 Tuscan regional elections but was not elected.

Returning to Sorano, he served again as a municipal councilor from 1990 to 1995. From 2004 to 2009, he was assessor for education and deputy mayor.

During the summer of 2019, he was hospitalized at Le Scotte polyclinic in Siena due to a serious illness and later transferred to the Gruccia hospital in Montevarchi, where he died on 7 September 2019, at the age of 80.

Political offices
Preceded by Fosco Monaci	President of the Province of Grosseto; 1985–1990	Succeeded by Lamberto Ciani
