= Francesco Limatola =

Italian politician (born 1970)

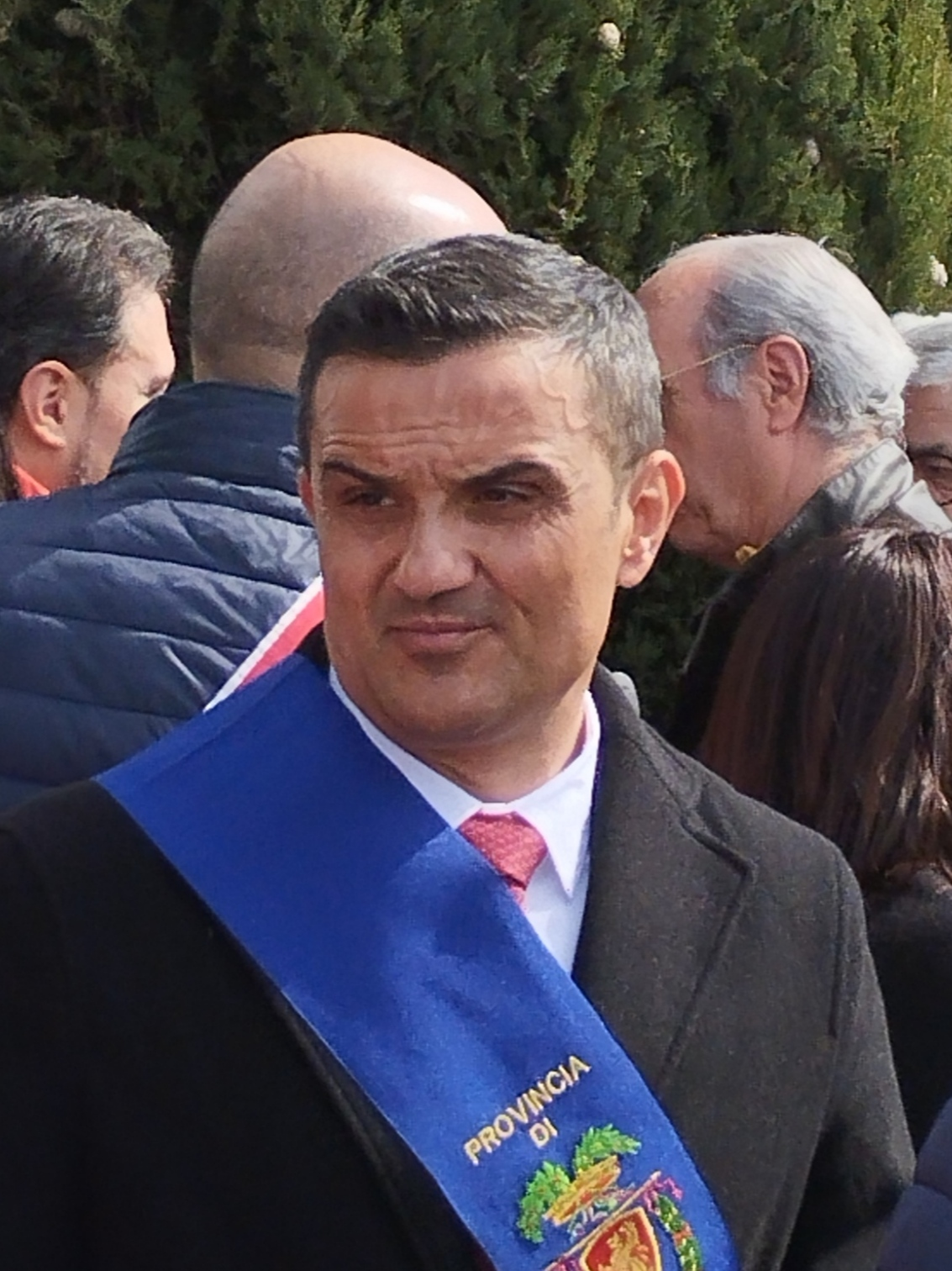
- Limatola in 2023

President of the Province of Grosseto
- Incumbent
- Assumed office 19 December 2021
- Preceded by: Antonfrancesco Vivarelli Colonna

Mayor of Roccastrada
- Incumbent
- Assumed office 26 May 2014
- Preceded by: Giancarlo Innocenti

Personal details
- Born: 20 July 1970 (age 56) Frattaminore, Campania, Italy
- Party: Democratic Party

Francesco Limatola (born 20 July 1970) is an Italian politician who has served as president of the Province of Grosseto since December 2021.

== Life and career ==
Limatola was born in Frattaminore, province of Naples, on 20 July 1970. Coming from a working-class family, he completed upper secondary education. In 1987, he passed an examination for the Italian Air Force, entering the career track for non-commissioned officers. The following year, in 1988, he was transferred to the Grosseto military airport, leading to his permanent relocation to Tuscany.

He began his political career in 2004 by being elected to the municipal council of Roccastrada with the Democrats of the Left. Re-elected in 2009, he was appointed assessor and, from September 2011, deputy mayor. In the 2014 municipal elections, Limatola was elected mayor of Roccastrada with a civic list. He was confirmed mayor for a second term in 2019.

In 2017, he supported Giancarlo Farnetani's candidacy for the presidency of the Province of Grosseto and was elected to the Grosseto Provincial Council. On 19 December 2021, Limatola was elected president of the Province, supported by the Democratic Party. He obtained 48,566 weighted votes, narrowly surpassing the centre-right candidate, Andrea Casamenti, who received 48,000. The result shifted the province's leadership toward a centre-left coalition. As president, he assumed the main responsibilities assigned to provincial administrations: budget, personnel, provincial road network, upper-secondary school buildings, territorial coordination, and the management of national and EU funding programmes.

In June 2024, at the conclusion of his second term as a mayor, Limatola ran again with the civic list "Limatola Sindaco". The list received 52.34% of the votes, granting him a third consecutive term.

On 21 November 2025, he was appointed acting president of the Tuscan section of the Union of Italian Provinces (UPI), following the election of the incumbent president, Gianni Lorenzetti, to the Regional Council of Tuscany. He became president of UPI Tuscany in May 2026.

Limatola was re-elected president of the Province of Grosseto in March 2026, defeating once again centre-right candidate Andrea Casamenti. He received 50,925 weighted votes (52.66%), against 45,786 (47.34%) for his opponent, securing a second term in office. Post-election analyses suggested that Limatola's victory was aided by cross-party support from local administrators, resulting in a shift of over 15,000 weighted votes compared to initial projections. Casamenti attributed the result to internal divisions within the centre-right and alleged "disloyalty" among its representatives, specifically criticising Arturo Cerulli, mayor of Monte Argentario, for reportedly backing Limatola.

Political offices
Preceded by Antonfrancesco Vivarelli Colonna	President of the Province of Grosseto; 2021–	Succeeded by
