= Ernesto Galeffi =

Italian sculptor

Ernesto Galeffi, also known as Chiò, (7 February 1917 - 1986) was an Italian sculptor.

== Biography ==
He was born in Montevarchi in Tuscany, where he lived most of his adult life. He was initially a pharmacist, but by the age of 37 years old he took up painting and sculpture. Initially influenced and trained under Constantin Brâncuși, by the 1950s and 1960s, his works became more individual. He is best known for his sculptures in bronze, wood, and stucco. A museum displaying many of his works, displayed in a building on Via Ammiraglio Burzagli #47, adjacent to his former house, has been opened in Montevarchi.
