= Maria Scrilli =

Italian religious sister and Blessed

Blessed Maria Scrilli
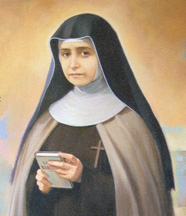
- Born: 15 May 1825; Montevarchi, Arezzo, Papal States
- Died: 14 November 1889 (aged 64); Florence, Kingdom of Italy
- Venerated in: Roman Catholic Church
- Beatified: 8 October 2006, Fiesole, Italy by Cardinal José Saraiva Martins
- Feast: 14 November

Maria Scrilli, religious name Maria Teresa of Jesus, (15 May 1825 – 14 November 1889) was an Italian religious sister who established the Sisters of Our Lady of Mount Carmel.

Scrilli became a noted educator and opened several schools. A period of anti-clericalism forced her to disband the schools and the congregation until a long while later when she could reinstitute the congregation and new schools. She was also known for her compassionate treatment of the poor and also for her enlightened views of a fundamental Christian education.

Pope Benedict XVI recognized a miracle attributed to her direct intercession in 2005 and allowed for her beatification in Fiesole on 8 October 2006; Cardinal José Saraiva Martins presided over the Mass on the behalf of the pope.

== Life ==
Maria Scrilli was born in 1825 as the second child into a household that was one of the most visible in the Italian nation. Her parents wanted a male heir and so her mother was quite indifferent to Scrilli during her childhood.

A serious illness during her adolescence confined her to her bed for eighteen months and she was healed. Her long convalescence solidified her belief that she was being called to serve God and to that end decided to enter a Carmelite convent on 28 May 1846 – Santa Maria Maddalenz de' Pazzi – despite the protests of her parents who objected this path for their daughter. She spent two months before going back home upon the realization that the cloistered life – which she loved – was not for her; she went back home to discern the will of the Lord.

Scrilli opened a small school for the education of girls and was noted for her enlightened views of a religious education. The Chief Magistrate and the Superintendent of Schools were so impressed with her work that – on 3 May 1842 – tasked her with running another that was larger than the one she operated and worked at. It was around this time she began to establish her own congregation and she obtained the approval of the local bishop on 15 October 1854 as well as the approval of the Grand Duke of Tuscany Leopold II of Habsburg.

She established the Sisters of Our Lady of Mount Carmel and assumed the new name of "Maria Teresa of Jesus"; this was a name that she took to honor fellow Carmelite Teresa of Ávila. She established a private school around this same time but it faced closure along with her other schools and the congregation itself on 30 November 1859 during the intense political period of anti-clericalism.

Once that period eased she moved to Florence on 18 March 1878 and reestablished the congregation and the schools with the permission of the Archbishop of Florence Eugenio Cecconi. Scrilli died on 14 November 1889.

New houses of her congregation were opened in 1919 and the order would receive the pontifical approval of Pope Pius XI on 27 February 1933. The congregation now operates in the United States of America and in other places such as Canada and the Philippines.

== Beatification process ==
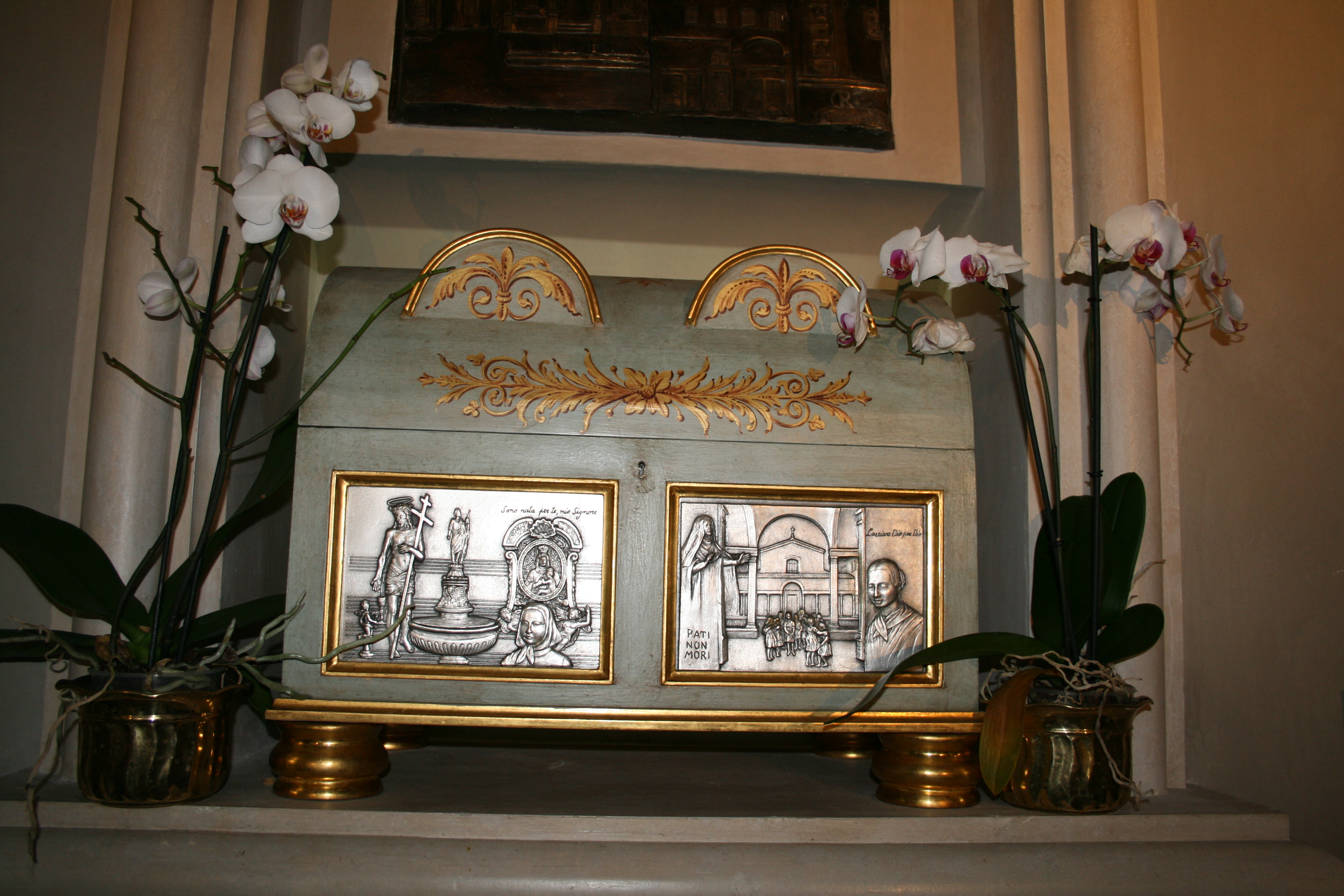
Reliquary of Blessed Maria Teresa of Jesus

The beatification proceedings opened in Fiesole and received the approval of the Congregation for the Causes of Saints under Pope John Paul II on 3 November 1988 which granted her the title Servant of God; what followed was a diocesan process that evaluated her life and her works as well as to ascertain how she lived a model life of virtue to a high standard. The process was decreed to be valid on 29 May 1992 and allowed for the postulation to compile and submit the Positio to Rome in 1996; it was at once relegated to the historical commission which met and gave its approval to the cause and its continuation on 26 November 1996.

John Paul II declared that Scrilli had indeed lived a model Christian life of heroic virtue on 20 December 2003 and so conferred upon her the title of Venerable.

The miracle needed for beatification was investigated on a diocesan level and was validated as being a valid and thorough investigation on 22 May 1998. The miracle received the papal approval of Pope Benedict XVI on 19 December 2005 and allowed for her beatification to take place. Cardinal José Saraiva Martins presided over the beatification on 8 October 2006 on the behalf of the pope. The postulator of the cause is Vincenzo Mosca.
