= Luciano Giorgi =

Italian politician (born 1940)

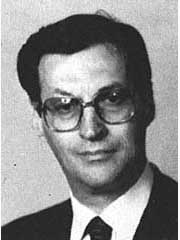

President of the Province of Grosseto
- In office 1970–1980
- Preceded by: Antonio Palandri
- Succeeded by: Claudio Asta

Member of the Senate
- In office 1992–1994

Personal details
- Born: 21 May 1940 (age 85) Roccastrada, Province of Grosseto, Kingdom of Italy
- Party: Italian Socialist Party
- Occupation: Lawyer

Luciano Giorgi (born 21 May 1940) is an Italian politician who served as president of the Province of Grosseto (1970–1980) and senator (1992–1994).

Political offices
Preceded by Antonio Palandri	President of the Province of Grosseto; 1970–1980	Succeeded by Claudio Asta
