= Leonardo Marras =

Italian politician

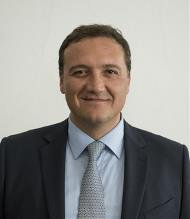

Regional assessor of Economy and Tourism of Tuscany
- Incumbent
- Assumed office 22 October 2020
- President: Eugenio Giani

Member of the Regional Council of Tuscany
- In office 17 June 2015 – 22 September 2020

President of the Province of Grosseto
- In office 23 June 2009 – 14 October 2014
- Preceded by: Lio Scheggi
- Succeeded by: Emilio Bonifazi

Mayor of Roccastrada
- In office 13 June 1999 – 7 June 2009
- Preceded by: Olinto Bartalucci
- Succeeded by: Giancarlo Innocenti

Personal details
- Born: 12 January 1973 (age 53) Grosseto, Tuscany, Italy
- Party: PDS (1992–1998); DS (1998–2007); PD (since 2007)
- Occupation: politician

Leonardo Marras (born 12 January 1973) is an Italian politician who has served as regional assessor for economy and tourism of Tuscany since October 2020. He previously served as mayor of Roccastrada (1999–2009), president of the Province of Grosseto (2009–2014), and member of the Regional Council of Tuscany (2015–2020).

== Life and career ==
Born in Grosseto on 12 January 1973, Marras graduated from the "Guglielmo Marconi" scientific high school and immediately began his political career, being elected as a municipal councilor in Roccastrada in 1992 with the Democratic Party of the Left. In 1999, at the age of 26, Marras was elected mayor of Roccastrada with the Democrats of the Left.

Marras has been a member of the Democratic Party since 2007. He ran for the office of President of the Province of Grosseto at the 2009 provincial elections, supported by a centre-left coalition, and won at the second round to the centre-right candidate Alessandro Antichi on 22 June. He took office on 23 June 2009. Besides being president of the province, Marras was also a delegate to the Regional Assembly of the Democratic Party, and a member of the Regional Council of Local Authorities. From 2012 to 2014, he represented Italy at the Council of Europe for the Congress of Local and Regional Authorities.

In 2015, he was elected as a member of the Regional Council of Tuscany with 10,265 votes, and also became the group leader of the party in the council. Within the assembly, he served as a member of the First Commission, the Institutional Commission for the socio-economic recovery of the Tuscan coast, and as vice-president of the Inquiry Commission for the Banca Monte dei Paschi di Siena.

In the 2018 general election, Marras was a candidate in the uninominal constituency of Grosseto for the Chamber of Deputies, on behalf of the centre-left coalition under the Democratic Party, garnering 28% of the votes and losing to the centre-right candidate Mario Lolini.

In September 2020, he was re-elected at the Tuscan regional election with 18,125 votes, making him the most voted candidate in Tuscany. On 22 October, he was appointed assessor of economy and tourism in the regional government led by president Eugenio Giani. Marras was replaced in the regional council by Donatella Spadi.

In October 2025, he was re-elected in the regional elections and was confirmed as regional assessor in the regional government by president Giani, with the addition of responsibility for agriculture.

Political offices
Preceded by Lio Scheggi	President of the Province of Grosseto; 2009-2014	Succeeded by Emilio Bonifazi
