= Antonio Palandri =

Italian politician (1925–2003)

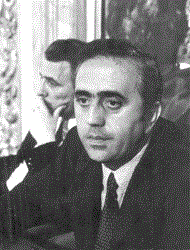
- Palandri in 1970

President of the Province of Grosseto
- In office 1967–1970
- Preceded by: Mario Ferri
- Succeeded by: Luciano Giorgi

Member of the Regional Council of Tuscany
- In office 1970–1975
- Constituency: Grosseto

Personal details
- Born: 3 March 1925 Montieri, Province of Grosseto, Kingdom of Italy
- Died: 23 November 2003 (aged 78) Grosseto, Tuscany, Italy
- Party: Italian Communist Party
- Occupation: Trade unionist

Geo Antonio Palandri (3 March 1925 – 23 November 2003) was an Italian politician and trade unionist.

A member of the Italian Communist Party, he served as vice-president of the Province of Grosseto from 1960 to 1967, as President of the same province from 1967 to 1970, and as member of the Regional Council of Tuscany from 1970 to 1975.

== Life and career ==
After completing elementary school, Palandri grew up in the mining environments between Boccheggiano and Montieri, working as a laborer until the immediate post-war period. From 1949 to 1951, he served as secretary of the miners' union and later became secretary of the provincial CGIL and the Confederation of Labor in Grosseto.

A member of the Italian Communist Party (PCI), he became part of the provincial federation's governing council and later served as vice-president of the Province of Grosseto from 1960, under the presidency of socialist Mario Ferri. In 1967, with the exit of the Italian Socialist Party from the majority, Palandri was elected president of the province, a position he held until 1970.

Palandri was then elected in the 1970 regional elections in the Grosseto constituency with 3,542 preferences. He served until 1975 as a member of the Regional Council of Tuscany and as a member of the Urban Planning Commission. In the 1980s, after a short time as president of the public transportation company of southern Tuscany, Rama Mobilità, he retired from public life definitively.

He died in Grosseto at the age of 78 on 23 November 2003.

Political offices
Preceded by Mario Ferri	President of the Province of Grosseto; 1967–1970	Succeeded by Luciano Giorgi
