= Paolo Lanfranco =

Italian politician (born 1982)

President of the Province of Asti
- In office 29 July 2019 – 13 June 2022
- Preceded by: Marco Gabusi
- Succeeded by: Maurizio Rasero

Mayor of Valfenera
- In office 29 May 2007 – 13 June 2022
- Preceded by: Giovanni Valle
- Succeeded by: Sergio Arisio

Personal details
- Born: 23 August 1982 (age 44) Asti, Italy
- Party: Lega Nord

Paolo Lanfranco (born 23 August 1982) is an Italian politician who served as president of the Province of Asti from 2019 to 2022.

== Life and career ==
Lanfranco was first elected mayor of Valfenera in 2007 and was re-elected in 2012 and 2017, running on a civic list. In 2014, he was elected to the Provincial Council of Asti and was re-elected in 2016. From December 2016 to October 2018, he served as vice president of the province under Marco Gabusi.

In the 2019 Piedmontese regional election, Lanfranco ran for the Regional Council of Piedmont on the Lega Nord list but was not elected.

On 29 July 2019, he was elected president of the Province of Asti, serving until 13 June 2022, when he handed over the functions to vice president Davide Massaglia.

In June 2022, Lanfranco resigned from the Lega Nord, which he had supported for 30 years, citing disagreements over the party's approach to local autonomy and its failure, in his view, to adequately defend local governments from interference by other institutions.
