= Ferruccio Bernardini =

Italian politician (1866–1946)

Member of the Chamber of Deputies
- In office 1913–1919
- Constituency: Montalcino

President of the Province of Arezzo
- In office 1920–1922

Personal details
- Born: Leonida Ferruccio Bernardini; 26 July 1866 Arezzo, Kingdom of Italy
- Died: 1946 (aged 79–80) Arezzo, Italy
- Party: Italian Socialist Party
- Occupation: Lawyer

Ferruccio Bernardini (26 July 1866 – 1946) was an Italian politician. He served as a member of the Chamber of Deputies of the Kingdom of Italy during the 24th Legislature, representing the constituency of Montalcino. He was a member of the Italian Socialist Party. He also served as president of the Province of Arezzo from 1920 to 1922.
