= Roberto Marmo =

Italian politician (born 1952)

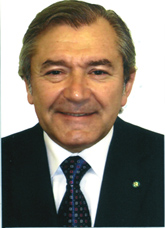

Member of the Chamber of Deputies
- In office 18 May 2011 – 15 March 2013
- Constituency: Piedmont 2

President of the Province of Asti
- In office 28 June 1999 – 13 February 2008
- Preceded by: Giuseppe Goria
- Succeeded by: Maria Teresa Armosino

Mayor of Canelli
- In office 10 June 1990 – 16 June 1994
- Preceded by: Renato Branda
- Succeeded by: Oscar Bielli

Personal details
- Born: 17 January 1952 (age 74) Canelli, Province of Asti, Italy
- Party: Christian Democracy; Forza Italia; The People of Freedom; Popular Civic List
- Profession: Entrepreneur

Roberto Marmo (born 17 January 1952) is an Italian politician and entrepreneur who served as mayor of Canelli (1990–1994), president of the Province of Asti (1999–2008), and a member of the Chamber of Deputies (2011–2013).
