= Lamberto Ciani =

Italian politician (born 1949)

President of the Province of Grosseto
- In office 20 July 1990 – 24 April 1995
- Preceded by: Alberto Cerreti
- Succeeded by: Stefano Gentili

Personal details
- Born: 10 February 1949 (age 77) Grosseto, Italy
- Party: Italian Socialist Party; Labour Federation; Democrats of the Left
- Education: University of Florence
- Occupation: Architect

Lamberto Ciani (born 10 February 1949) is an Italian architect and politician who served as president of the Province of Grosseto from 1990 to 1995.

== Life and career ==
Born in Grosseto in 1949, Ciani earned a degree in architecture at the University of Florence and worked as an architect. He entered politics within the ranks of the Italian Socialist Party, serving as a municipal councillor and as assessor for public works in Castiglione della Pescaia from 1985 to 1993.

In 1990, he ran in the provincial administrative elections and was elected president of the Province of Grosseto representing the Italian Socialist Party, in an alliance with the Democratic Party of the Left and the Italian Republican Party.

At the end of his term and following the dissolution of his party, in 1995 he joined the Labour Federation and served as a provincial councillor until 1997. He later followed the merger of the Labourites into the newly formed Democrats of the Left, for whom he served as a municipal councillor in Grosseto during the first term of Alessandro Antichi. During his time on the council, he was appointed by the regional government of Tuscany as extraordinary commissioner to draft the general waste management plan.

In 1999, Ciani stood as a candidate for the Democrats of the Left in the elections to the European Parliament, obtaining 12,428 votes but not being elected.

After retiring from politics at the end of his experience as a municipal councillor in 2001, he later served as president of the Agency for the Protection of Quality of the Municipality of Grosseto from 2002 to 2006.

== Sources ==
- Bonifazi, Emilio (2015). Grosseto e i suoi amministratori dal 1944 al 2015. Grosseto: Innocenti Editore.

Political offices
Preceded by Alberto Cerreti	President of the Province of Grosseto; 1990–1995	Succeeded by Stefano Gentili
