= Mario Ferri (Italian politician) =

Italian politician (1927–1978)

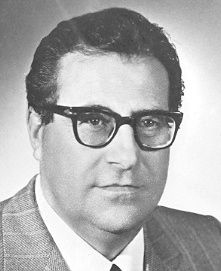

President of the Province of Grosseto
- In office 27 September 1952 – 1967
- Preceded by: Emilio Suardi
- Succeeded by: Antonio Palandri

Member of the Senate
- In office 1970–1972

Member of the Chamber of Deputies
- In office 1972–1978

Personal details
- Born: 11 January 1927 Grosseto, Kingdom of Italy
- Died: 8 May 1978 (aged 51) Grosseto, Tuscany, Italy
- Party: Italian Socialist Party

Mario Ferri (11 January 1927 – 8 May 1978) was an Italian politician who served as president of the Province of Grosseto (1952–1967), senator (1970–1972) and deputy (1972–1978).

He was also chairman of the football team U.S. Grosseto from 1955 to 1978.

Political offices
Preceded by Emilio Suardi	President of the Province of Grosseto; 1952–1967	Succeeded by Antonio Palandri
