= Simone Nosenzo =

Italian politician (born 1986)

President of the Province of Asti
- Incumbent
- Assumed office 21 June 2026
- Preceded by: Maurizio Rasero

Mayor of Nizza Monferrato
- Incumbent
- Assumed office 5 June 2016
- Preceded by: Flavio Pesce

Personal details
- Born: 24 July 1986 (age 40) Turin, Piedmont, Italy
- Party: The People of Freedom

Simone Nosenzo (born 24 July 1986) is an Italian politician who has served as president of the Province of Asti since 2026 and as mayor of Nizza Monferrato since 2016.

Nosenzo was first elected to the municipal council of Nizza Monferrato in 2009 as a member of The People of Freedom. In 2016, he was elected mayor and was subsequently re-elected. In 2021, Nosenzo was elected to the Provincial Council of Asti, and was appointed vice president of the province on 19 December 2024. Following the resignation of Maurizio Rasero, Nosenzo served as acting president from 27 April 2026 until his election as president on 21 June 2026, supported by the centre-right coalition.
