= Silvia Chiassai Martini =

Italian politician (born 1978)

President of the Province of Arezzo
- In office 31 October 2018 – 18 December 2022
- Preceded by: Roberto Vasai
- Succeeded by: Alessandro Polcri

Mayor of Montevarchi
- Incumbent
- Assumed office 21 June 2016
- Preceded by: Francesco Maria Grasso

Personal details
- Born: 19 July 1978 (age 48) Florence, Tuscany, Italy
- Profession: Psychotherapist

Silvia Chiassai Martini (born 19 July 1978) is an Italian politician and psychotherapist. She served as president of the Province of Arezzo from 2018 to 2022 and has been mayor of Montevarchi since 2016.

== Life and career ==
Chiassai Martini was born in Florence in 1978 and grew up in Montevarchi. She graduated in occupational psychology from the University of Florence and subsequently specialized in family psychotherapy. She worked in the field of eating disorders and taught on advanced training courses at the University of Siena. Since 2006, she has worked as a psychotherapist, with practices in Montevarchi and Siena.

In June 2016, Chiassai Martini was elected mayor of Montevarchi in the runoff, defeating centre-left candidate Paolo Antonio Ricci with 59.36% of the vote (5,883 votes) against 40.64% (4,028 votes). She was supported by a centre-right coalition comprising Forza Italia, Lega Nord, and civic lists. She was re-elected in October 2021, receiving 59.71% of the vote (6,816 votes) in the first round.

In December 2016, Chiassai Martini was elected to the Provincial Council of Arezzo. In October 2018, she was elected president of the Province of Arezzo, defeating centre-left candidate Ginetta Menchetti with 43,511 weighted votes (50.4%) against 42,827 (49.6%). She became the first woman to hold the office. Four years later, in 2022, she failed to win re-election as president, losing to Alessandro Polcri, the mayor of Anghiari, who received 47,202 weighted votes (52.38%) against her 42,908 (47.62%).
