= Luigi Mascagni =

Italian politician (1885–1945)

Member of the Chamber of Deputies
- In office 1919–1921
- Constituency: Siena–Arezzo–Grosseto

Personal details
- Born: 15 September 1885 Arezzo, Kingdom of Italy
- Died: 5 September 1945 (aged 59) Arezzo, Italy
- Party: Italian Socialist Party
- Occupation: Clerk, accountant

Luigi Mascagni (15 September 1885 – 5 September 1945) was an Italian politician and antifascist. He was a member of the Italian Socialist Party and served as a deputy in the Chamber of Deputies of the Kingdom of Italy during the 25th Legislature. During World War II, he participated in the Italian Resistance and later served as president of the National Liberation Committee of the Province of Arezzo. On 10 November 1944, he was also appointed president of the Province.
