= Walter Malvezzi =

Italian politician

Vice president of Tuscany
- In office 28 July 1970 – 28 July 1975
- President: Lelio Lagorio
- Succeeded by: Gianfranco Bartolini

Member of the Regional Council of Tuscany
- In office 1970–1980

Personal details
- Born: 13 April 1924 Castel del Rio, Province of Bologna, Kingdom of Italy
- Died: 9 March 1989 (aged 64) Florence, Italy
- Party: Italian Communist Party

Walter Malvezzi (13 April 1924 – 9 March 1989) was an Italian politician of the Italian Communist Party (PCI). He served as a member of the Regional Council of Tuscany from 1970 to 1980 and as vice president of the Regional Government during the first Tuscan legislature.

== Life and career ==
Born in Castel del Rio, in the province of Bologna, Malvezzi joined the PCI in 1945. From 1949 he was active in the party's youth organization and later became a prominent figure in the Florentine federation of the PCI. He served as regional secretary of the party in Tuscany from 1965 to 1970 and was a member of the PCI Central Committee from 1965 to 1975.

Malvezzi was a member of the Florence City Council from 1960 to 1964. In the 1970 regional election he was elected to the Regional Council of Tuscany. During the council's first legislature he served as vice president of the Regional Government. Re-elected in 1975, he chaired the Institutional Affairs Commission.

Malvezzi died in Florence on 9 March 1989.
