= Luberto da Montevarchi =

Italian painter

Luberto da Montevarchi, also known as Roberto da Montevarchi or Il Montevarchi (1460-1522), was an Italian painter of the Renaissance period, active in the Valdarno.

He appears to have trained in the school of Pietro Perugino, and worked with him in decorating the Collegio del Cambio in Perugia. An arch of detached frescoes from the former church Sant'Andrea a Cennano are now on display in the Museo di Arte Sacra della Collegiata di San Lorenzo in Montevarchi.
