= Sara Ducci =

Italian physicist

Sara Ducci (born 1971) is an Italian physicist whose research has involved pattern formation in nonlinear optics, optical parametric oscillators, cavity optomechanics, integrated quantum photonics, and the generation of quantum entanglement. She works in France as a professor in the Université Paris Cité, associated with the Laboratory Matériaux et Phénomènes Quantiques (MPQ).

== Education and career ==
Ducci was born in 1971, in Montevarchi. She studied physics at the University of Florence, earning both a laurea and a PhD there.

She was a postdoctoral researcher at the Kastler–Brossel Laboratory in Paris from 2000 to 2001. After a temporary appointment at the École normale supérieure Paris-Saclay, she joined Paris Diderot University, one of the predecessor institutions of the Université Paris Cité, in 2002. She was promoted to full professor in 2008.

== Recognition ==
Ducci was named as a junior member of the Institut Universitaire de France in 2012. She was the 2016 recipient of the Louis Ancel Prize of the Société Française de Physique.

Optica named her as a 2024 Optica Fellow, "for significant achievements in integrated nonlinear quantum photonics from fundamentals to applications, and a deep commitment to education and mentorship".
