= Giovanni Magrassi =

Italian lawyer and politician (1891–1969)

President of the Province of Grosseto
- In office 1944–1947
- Preceded by: Arturo Galli
- Succeeded by: Raffaello Bellucci

Member of the Constituent Assembly of Italy
- In office 3 July 1947 – 31 January 1948

Personal details
- Born: Eliseo Giovanni Magrassi; 4 March 1891 Livorno, Kingdom of Italy
- Died: 24 July 1969 (aged 78) Grosseto, Italy
- Party: Italian Republican Party
- Occupation: Lawyer

Eliseo Giovanni Magrassi (4 March 1891 – 24 July 1969) was an Italian lawyer and politician. A prominent member of the Italian Republican Party, he served as president of the Province of Grosseto from 1944 to 1947, and member of the Constituent Assembly of Italy.

== Biography ==
Son of Domenico and Delphina, he graduated in law from the University of Pisa in 1913, where he joined the Italian Republican Party at a young age. Elected to the Pisa City Council, he served as an assessor for public education. During those years, he became a Freemason, joining the Grand Orient of Italy. On 6 August 1914, he was among the promoters of a demonstration held in Livorno against Italy's participation in World War I.

Magrassi moved to Grosseto in 1921, where he practiced law opening a firm in his villa in Via Vinzaglio. At the end of World War II, he returned to active politics, which he had abandoned during the fascist era, joining the executive committee of the National Liberation Committee of Grosseto and being appointed president of the province, a position he held until 1947. In 1946, he was elected to the Constituent Assembly on the Italian Republican Party's list. In the subsequent 1948 general election, he ran for the Senate in the Grosseto constituency, receiving 16,888 votes (15.33%), but was not elected.

In his later years, he was hospitalized in a clinic for health reasons and died on 24 July 1969. He was buried in Pisa.

Political offices
Preceded by Arturo Galli	President of the Province of Grosseto; 1944–1947	Succeeded by Raffaello Bellucci
