= Giovanni Ciarpaglini =

Italian politician and anti-fascist

President of the Province of Arezzo
- In office 1947 – 8 February 1953
- Succeeded by: Aureliano Santini

Personal details
- Born: 23 February 1899 Montiano, Magliano in Toscana, Province of Grosseto, Kingdom of Italy
- Died: 8 February 1953 (aged 53) Arezzo, Italy
- Party: Italian Communist Party
- Occupation: Miner

Giovanni Ciarpaglini (23 February 1899 – 8 February 1953) was an Italian politician, anti-fascist, and partisan who served as president of the Province of Arezzo from 1947 until his death in 1953. A member of the Italian Communist Party (PCI), he played a leading role in the anti-fascist movement in Tuscany and in the local resistance during World War II.

== Life and career ==
Born in Montiano, near Grosseto, Ciarpaglini joined the socialist movement in 1919 and became a member of the Italian Communist Party at its foundation in 1921. A miner by profession, he was active in labour struggles in the province of Grosseto and was repeatedly persecuted by the Fascist regime. After periods of imprisonment and political exile in France, he was arrested again in 1932 and confined on the islands of Ponza and Ventotene.

Following the fall of Fascism in 1943, Ciarpaglini returned to political activity in the province of Arezzo, serving as secretary of the local Communist federation and participating in the Italian Resistance and the establishment of the local National Liberation Committee. In 1947 he became president of the Province of Arezzo and was confirmed as head of the provincial government after the 1951 election. He remained in office until his death in Arezzo in 1953.

== Sources ==
- Biagianti, Ivo; Nocentini, Tiziana; Repek, Claudio (2001). La Camera del Lavoro di Arezzo 1901–2001. Montepulciano: Le Balze.
- Galli, Giovanni (1992). Arezzo e la sua provincia nel regime fascista, 1926–1943. Florence: Centro Editoriale Toscano.
