= Alessandro Polcri =

President of the Province of Arezzo
- Incumbent
- Assumed office 19 December 2022
- Preceded by: Silvia Chiassai Martini

Mayor of Anghiari
- Incumbent
- Assumed office 6 June 2016
- Preceded by: Riccardo La Ferla

Personal details
- Born: 21 June 1982 (age 44) Sansepolcro, Tuscany, Italy

Alessandro Polcri (born 21 June 1982) is an Italian politician, serving as president of the Province of Arezzo since 2022 and mayor of Anghiari since 2016.

== Life and career ==
Born in Sansepolcro, in the province of Arezzo, Polcri graduated in law and later worked as a risk management and pre-legal investigations professional.

He began his political career in 2007 when he was elected municipal councillor in Anghiari, and he was re-elected in 2011. In 2016, he was elected mayor of Anghiari, and re-elected in 2021 with the 53% of preferences.

In December 2022, Polcri was elected president of the Province of Arezzo, obtaining a majority of weighted votes (52,38%) over incumbent president Silvia Chiassai Martini. His election was marked by an unusual cross-party majority, as both Polcri and his main opponent were associated with centre-right politics, leading to a split within the centre-right and a transversal coalition supporting Polcri.

He also served as president of the Unione Montana dei Comuni della Valtiberina and as a member of the board of the Consorzio di Bonifica 2 Alto Valdarno.
