= Aureliano Santini =

Italian politician

President of the Province of Arezzo
- In office 1953–1964
- Preceded by: Giovanni Ciarpaglini
- Succeeded by: Andrea Guffanti

Personal details
- Born: 12 February 1911 Fontanella, Empoli, Province of Florence, Kingdom of Italy
- Died: 19 January 1966 (aged 54) Arezzo, Italy
- Party: Italian Communist Party

Aureliano Santini (12 February 1911 – 19 January 1966) was an Italian communist politician and partisan. He served as president of the Province of Arezzo from 1953 to 1964 and was a leading figure of the Italian Communist Party (PCI) in Tuscany.

== Life and career ==
Santini was born in Fontanella, a village near Empoli, in 1911. In 1931 he was arrested by the Fascist regime for communist activity and sentenced to one year in prison. After his release in 1932, he went into exile abroad, living in Corsica, France, and the Soviet Union, where he attended a Leninist school in Moscow. He also fought in the Spanish Civil War as an officer in the Garibaldi Brigades, during which he was wounded in 1937.

During World War II he was interned by French authorities in Algeria and later imprisoned in Italy for draft evasion and political activity. After the fall of Fascism, he joined the Italian Resistance in Empoli and became involved in the local National Liberation Committee (CLN), taking on administrative responsibilities after the liberation.

After the war, Santini held senior positions within the Italian Communist Party in the province of Arezzo, serving as provincial secretary and as a member of the provincial administration. In 1953 he became president of the Province of Arezzo following the death of Giovanni Ciarpaglini, a position he held until 1964, when he resigned due to health reasons. He died in Arezzo in 1966.

== Archives ==
The personal archival fonds of Santini is held at the Institute for the History of the Resistance in Tuscany (ISRT). It contains documents relating to anti-fascism in the Empoli area and includes judicial records, as well as Fascist police and court materials such as OVRA files, Special Tribunal sentences, propaganda leaflets, and records concerning local mutual aid organisations.

== Sources ==
- Cansella, Ilaria; Cecchetti, Francesco (2012). Volontari antifascisti toscani nella guerra civile spagnola. Arcidosso: Effigi.
- Cirri, Rineo (1992). Antifascismo e antifascisti nell'empolese. Firenze: Pagnini Editore.
- Niccolai, Pier Luigi; Terreni, Stefania (1995). Era la Resistenza: il contributo di Empoli alla lotta contro il fascismo e per la liberazione. Firenze: Pagnini Editore.
- Pezzino, Paolo (2005). La tradizione antifascista a Empoli, 1919–1948: atti del convegno. Ospedaletto: Pacini Editore.
