= Ermanno Benocci =

Italian politician (1930–2004)

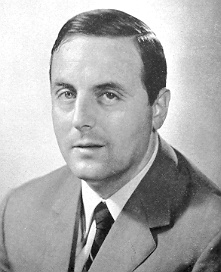

Mayor of Sorano
- In office June 1956 – December 1960
- Preceded by: Ivo Dominici
- Succeeded by: Silvio Baldini
- In office 1980–1983
- Preceded by: Alberto Cerreti
- Succeeded by: Giorgio Rossi
- In office 17 May 1990 – 26 April 2004
- Preceded by: Domenico Barbini
- Succeeded by: Pierandrea Vanni

Member of the Chamber of Deputies
- In office 13 December 1966 – 17 December 1969

Member of the Regional Council of Tuscany
- In office 1983–1985

Personal details
- Born: 25 June 1930 Sorano, Province of Grosseto, Kingdom of Italy
- Died: 26 April 2004 (aged 73) Sorano, Tuscany, Italy
- Party: Italian Communist Party (until 1991); Democratic Party of the Left (1991–1998); Democrats of the Left (1998–2004)
- Occupation: Employee

Ermanno Benocci (25 June 1930 – 26 April 2004) is an Italian politician who served as mayor of Sorano (1956–1960, 1980–1983, 1990–2004), Deputy (1966–1969), vice president of the Province of Grosseto (1970–1980), and member of the Regional Council of Tuscany (1983–1985).
