= List of presidents of the Province of Arezzo =

President of the Province of Arezzo
- Presidente della Provincia di Arezzo
- Incumbent; Alessandro Polcri since 18 December 2022
- Term length: 4 years
- Inaugural holder: Pietro Maggi
- Formation: 1889

The president of the Province of Arezzo is the head of the provincial government in Arezzo, Tuscany, Italy. The president oversees the administration of the province, coordinates the activities of the municipalities, and represents the province in regional and national matters.

Since 18 December 2022, the office has been held by Alessandro Polcri, , who was formally sworn in on 5 January 2023

== List ==
=== Presidents of the Provincial Deputation (1889–1927) ===
No.	Portrait	Name	Term of office		Party
No.	Portrait	Name	Start	End	Party
1		Pietro Maggi	1889	1899	?
2		Giovanni Arrighi Griffoli	1899	1904	?
3		Tito Bartolomei	1905	?	?
		Ferruccio Bernardini	1920	1922	Italian Socialist Party
		Girolamo Ristori	?	1927	National Fascist Party

=== Presidents of the Provincial Rectorate (1927–1944) ===
No.	Portrait	Name	Term of office		Party
No.	Portrait	Name	Start	End	Party
		Guido Ghezzi	?	?	National Fascist Party

=== Presidents of the Provincial Deputation (1944–1951) ===
No.	Portrait	Name	Term of office		Party
No.	Portrait	Name	Start	End	Party
		Luigi Mascagni	10 November 1944	?	Italian Socialist Party
		Giovanni Ciarpaglini	1947	1951	Italian Communist Party

=== Presidents of the Province (1951–present) ===
No.	Portrait	Name	Term of office		Party
No.	Portrait	Name	Start	End	Party
1		Giovanni Ciarpaglini	1951	1953	Italian Communist Party
2		Aureliano Santini	1953	4 February 1964	Italian Communist Party
3		Andrea Guffanti	4 February 1964	1965	Italian Communist Party
4		Mario Bellucci	1965	1975	Italian Communist Party
5		Italo Monacchini	1975	1980	Italian Communist Party
6		Tito Barbini	1980	1985	Italian Communist Party
7		Franco Parigi	18 July 1985	20 June 1990	Italian Communist Party
8		Mauro Tarchi	20 June 1990	29 April 1995	Democratic Party of the Left; Democrats of the Left
8		Mauro Tarchi	29 April 1995	14 June 1999	Democratic Party of the Left; Democrats of the Left
9		Vincenzo Ceccarelli	14 June 1999	14 June 2004	Democrats of the Left; Democratic Party
9		Vincenzo Ceccarelli	14 June 2004	23 June 2009	Democrats of the Left; Democratic Party
10		Roberto Vasai	23 June 2009	3 November 2014	Democratic Party
10		Roberto Vasai	3 November 2014	31 October 2018	Democratic Party
11		Silvia Chiassai Martini	31 October 2018	18 December 2022	Independent (centre-right)
12		Alessandro Polcri	18 December 2022	incumbent	Independent (centre-right)

== Sources ==
- La provincia di Arezzo: arte, costume, storia. Polistampa. 2001.
- Galli, Giovanni (1992). Arezzo e la sua provincia nel regime fascista, 1926–1943. Centro Editoriale Toscano.
- Piera Menichini (2005). "I presidenti delle Province dall'Unità alla Grande guerra: repertorio analitico". Storia Amministrazione Costituzione (13): 225–226.
