= Marco Gabusi =

Italian politician (born 1980)

Regional assessor for Transport and Public Works of Piedmont
- Incumbent
- Assumed office 14 June 2019
- President: Alberto Cirio

President of the Province of Asti
- In office 14 November 2016 – 27 May 2019
- Preceded by: Fabrizio Brignolo
- Succeeded by: Paolo Lanfranco

Mayor of Canelli
- In office 8 June 2009 – 27 May 2019

Personal details
- Born: 26 September 1980 (age 45) Canelli, Piedmont, Italy
- Party: Forza Italia

Marco Gabusi (born 26 September 1980) is an Italian politician who has served as regional assessor for Transport and Public Works of Piedmont since 2019. He previously served as mayor of Canelli (2009–2019) and president of the Province of Asti (2016–2019).
