= Maria Teresa Armosino =

Italian politician (born 1955)

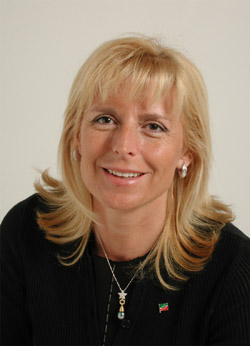

Member of the Chamber of Deputies
- In office 9 May 1996 – 14 March 2013
- Constituency: Piedmont 2

Undersecretary of State for the Ministry of Economy and Finance
- In office 12 June 2001 – 17 May 2006
- Prime Minister: Silvio Berlusconi
- Preceded by: Natale D'Amico
- Succeeded by: Massimo Tononi

President of the Province of Asti
- In office 29 April 2008 – 30 October 2012
- Preceded by: Roberto Marmo
- Succeeded by: Fabrizio Brignolo

Personal details
- Born: 20 July 1955 (age 71) Turin, Italy
- Party: FI (1996–2009); PdL (2009–2013)
- Profession: Lawyer

Maria Teresa Giovanna Armosino (born 20 July 1955) is an Italian politician who served as a member of the Chamber of Deputies (1996–2013), Undersecretary of State for the Ministry of Economy and Finance (2001–2006), and president of the Province of Asti (2008–2012).
