= List of mayors of Asti =

Mayor of Asti
- Sindaco di Asti
- Incumbent; Maurizio Rasero since 27 June 2017
- Appointer: Popular election
- Term length: 5 years, renewable once
- Formation: 1848
- Website: Official website

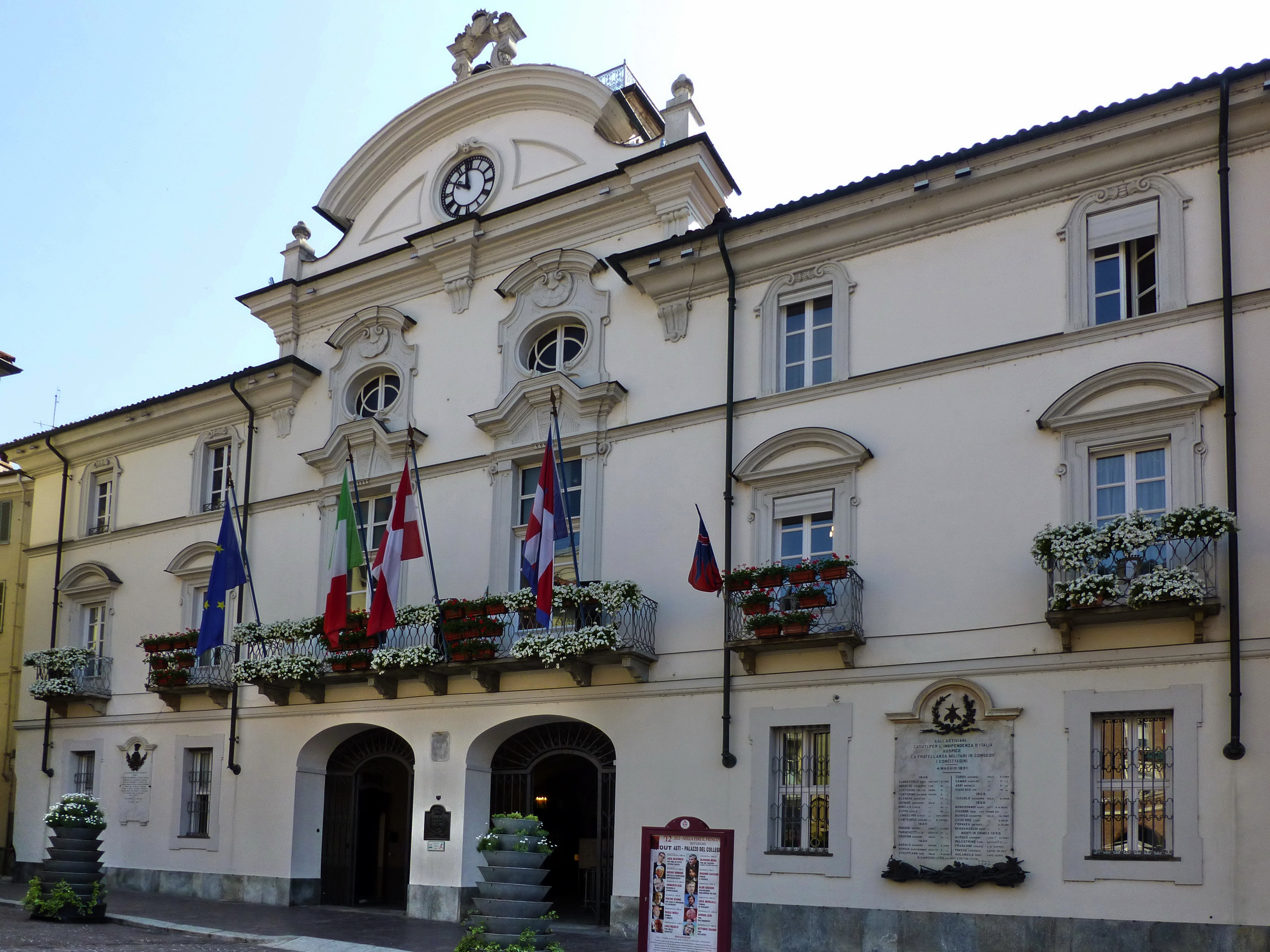
Asti's Town Hall.

The mayor of Asti is an elected politician who, along with the Asti City Council, is accountable for the strategic government of Asti in Piedmont, Italy.

The current mayor is Maurizio Rasero (FI), who took office on 27 June 2017.

== Overview ==
According to the Italian Constitution, the mayor of Asti is member of the City Council.

The mayor is elected by the population of Asti, who also elects the members of the City Council, controlling the mayor's policy guidelines and is able to enforce his resignation by a motion of no confidence. The mayor is entitled to appoint and release the members of his government.

Since 1993 the mayor is elected directly by Asti's electorate: in all mayoral elections in Italy in cities with a population higher than 15,000 the voters express a direct choice for the mayor or an indirect choice voting for the party of the candidate's coalition. If no candidate receives at least 50% of votes, the top two candidates go to a second round after two weeks. The election of the City Council is based on a direct choice for the candidate with a preference vote: the candidate with the majority of the preferences is elected. The number of the seats for each party is determined proportionally.

== Italian Republic (since 1946) ==
=== City Council election (1946-1994) ===
From 1946 to 1994, the Mayor of Asti was elected by the City Council.

	Mayor	Term start	Term end	Party
1	Felice Platone	1946	1951	PCI
2	Giovanni Viale	1951	1960	DC
3	Giovanni Giraudi	1960	1967	DC
4	Cesare Marchia	1967	1971	DC
5	Guglielmo Berzano	1971	1975	DC
6	Gian Piero Vigna	1975	1982	PSDI
7	Guglielmo Pasta	1982	1983	PLI
(6)	Gian Piero Vigna	1983	1985	PSDI
8	Giorgio Galvagno	1985	1994	PSI

=== Direct election (since 1994) ===
Since 1994, under provisions of new local administration law, the Mayor of Asti is chosen by direct election, originally every four, then every five years.

	Mayor	Term start	Term end	Party	Coalition	Election
9	Alberto Bianchino	28 June 1994	8 June 1998	PDS	PDS • PRC	1994
10	Luigi Florio	8 June 1998	11 June 2002	FI	FI • AN • CCD • CDU	1998
11	Vittorio Voglino	11 June 2002	30 May 2007	DL	DS • DL • PdCI	2002
(8)	Giorgio Galvagno	30 May 2007	22 May 2012	FI	FI • AN • LN	2007
12	Fabrizio Brignolo	22 May 2012	27 June 2017	PD	PD • IdV • Mod	2012
13	Maurizio Rasero	27 June 2017	13 June 2022	FI	FI • Lega • FdI	2017
13	Maurizio Rasero	13 June 2022	Incumbent	FI	FI • Lega • FdI	2022
