= Stefano Gentili =

Italian politician (1957–2023)

President of the Province of Grosseto
- In office 8 May 1995 – 14 June 1999
- Preceded by: Lamberto Ciani
- Succeeded by: Lio Scheggi

Personal details
- Born: 28 July 1957 Pitigliano, Province of Grosseto, Italy
- Died: 26 April 2023 (aged 65)
- Party: Christian Democracy; Italian People's Party; The Daisy
- Occupation: Teacher, journalist

Stefano Gentili (28 July 1957 – 26 April 2023) was an Italian politician.

He served as municipal councillor, assessor and deputy mayor in Pitigliano, Tuscany, and as President of the Province of Grosseto from 1995 to 1999.

== Life and career ==
Graduating in 1978 from the "Francesco Zuccarelli" Technical Commercial Institute in Pitigliano, he was president of Catholic Action for the diocese of Pitigliano-Sovana-Orbetello for eight years, also serving as national councilor for the same association for three years. He graduated in political science from the University of Florence with a thesis on the Italian Socialist Party and later obtained a diploma from the "San Bonaventura" Institute of Religious Sciences in Viterbo. He practiced as a teacher from 1984 and also worked as a freelance journalist, directing the religious section of the regional magazine Toscana Oggi for five years.

In 1987, he entered politics by joining the Christian Democracy party. From 1990 to 1995, he served as a city councilor in Pitigliano. After the dissolution of the Christian Democracy, he joined the Italian People's Party.

In the 1995 local elections, he ran for the presidency of the Province of Grosseto, representing a center-left coalition composed of the Democratic Party of the Left, the Italian Republican Party, the Segni Pact, the Italian People's Party, the Lega Nord, the Federation of the Greens, the Italian Socialists, the Democratic Alliance, and the civic list "Testimonianza per la Città". In the first round, he received 36.8% of the votes against the 30.7% of the center-right candidate Giovanni Tamburro, and then secured 58.11% in the runoff.

From February to December 1999, he served as commissioner of the Maremma Regional Park. From 2002 to 2007, he was deputy mayor of Pitigliano, as well as assessor for productive activities and professional training.

Suffering from idiopathic pulmonary fibrosis, in January 2007 he underwent a lung transplant at Le Scotte Hospital in Siena, with the operation conducted by surgeon Luca Voltolini. In the summer of 2010, he participated in the thirteenth edition of the European Games for Heart and Lung Transplant Recipients held in Växjö, Sweden.

Gentili died on 26 April 2023, at the age of 65.

Political offices
Preceded by Lamberto Ciani	President of the Province of Grosseto; 1995–1999	Succeeded by Lio Scheggi
