= Marino Papucci =

Italian politician and trade unionist

Regional assessor for Agriculture and Industry of Tuscany
- In office 28 July 1970 – 28 July 1975
- President: Lelio Lagorio

Member of the Regional Council of Tuscany
- In office 1970–1975

Personal details
- Born: 2 August 1925 Capannori, Province of Lucca, Kingdom of Italy
- Died: 18 September 1987 (aged 62)
- Party: Italian Socialist Party
- Occupation: Trade unionist

Marino Papucci (2 August 1925 – 18 September 1987) was an Italian trade unionist and politician.

== Life and career ==
Born in Capannori, in the province of Lucca, Papucci lived in Pisa. He became a leading figure in trade union activity within the local branch of the Italian Federation of Metalworkers (FIOM).

He was active in local politics as a member of the municipal council of Pontedera. Within the Italian Socialist Party (PSI), Papucci served as vice-secretary and later secretary of the provincial federation, and was also a member of the party's central committee.

In the 1970 regional elections, he was elected to the Regional Council of Tuscany with 1,748 votes. On 28 July 1970, he was appointed regional assessor for Agriculture and Industry in the first regional executive of Tuscany, led by president Lelio Lagorio. He stood for re-election in the 1975 regional elections but failed to regain his seat.

Papucci died on 18 September 1987.

== Sources ==
- Baccetti, Carlo (June 2005). "Le prime elezioni regionali in Toscana (1970 e 1975): formazione e tipologia di un nuovo ceto politico". Quaderni dell'Osservatorio Elettorale – Italian Journal of Electoral Studies. 53 (1): 5–62. doi:10.36253/qoe-12722.
