= Vincenzo Ceccarelli =

Italian politician

Member of the Regional Council of Tuscany
- In office 8 October 2020 – 11 October 2025
- In office 16 April 2010 – 14 March 2013

Regional assessor for Transports of Tuscany
- In office 18 March 2013 – 22 September 2020
- President: Enrico Rossi

President of the Province of Arezzo
- In office 14 June 1999 – 23 June 2009
- Preceded by: Mauro Tarchi
- Succeeded by: Roberto Vasai

Mayor of Castel San Niccolò
- In office 2 September 1985 – 24 April 1995

Personal details
- Born: 3 March 1960 (age 66) Castel San Niccolò, Province of Arezzo, Italy
- Party: Italian Communist Party (until 1991); Democratic Party of the Left (1991–1998); Democrats of the Left (1998–2007); Democratic Party (since 2007)
- Occupation: Project manager

Vincenzo Ceccarelli (born 3 March 1960) is an Italian politician who served as president of the Province of Arezzo and regional assessor for Transports of Tuscany.

== Life and career ==
Ceccarelli began his political career in the Italian Communist Party (PCI), being elected to the municipal council of Castel San Niccolò in 1985, where he later became mayor, serving until 1995. He then moved into provincial politics, becoming president of the Province of Arezzo in 1999 and serving until 2009.

In the 2010 regional election, Ceccarelli was elected to the Regional Council of Tuscany. From 2013 to 2020 he served as assessor for Transports in the regional government of Tuscany under president Enrico Rossi, and was re-elected to the Regional Council in 2015 and 2020, where he later served as group leader of the Democratic Party.

He also stood as a candidate for the Chamber of Deputies in the 2022 general election, but was not elected.

In 2026, he ran for mayor of Arezzo as the centre-left candidate, reaching the runoff election.
