= Lio Scheggi =

Italian politician (born 1948)

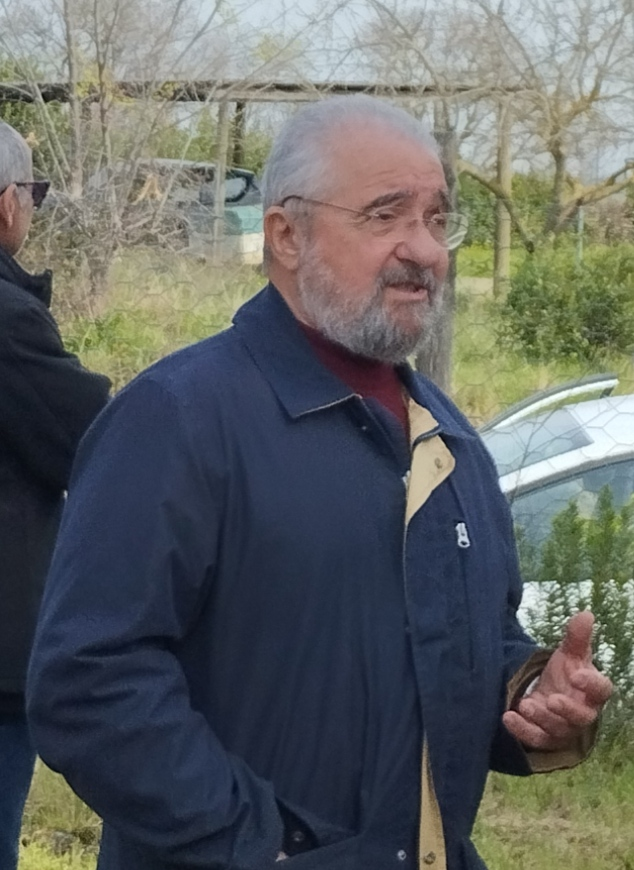
- Scheggi in 2023

President of the Province of Grosseto
- In office 16 June 1999 – 23 June 2009
- Preceded by: Stefano Gentili
- Succeeded by: Leonardo Marras

Personal details
- Born: 1 September 1948 (age 77) Grosseto, Italy
- Party: Democratic Party of the Left; Democrats of the Left; Democratic Party

Lio Scheggi (born 1 September 1948) is an Italian politician who served as president of the Province of Grosseto from 1999 to 2009.

== Life and career ==
Born in Grosseto in 1948, he graduated in accounting and in 1967 began working for the local branch of the National Confederation of Artisans and Small and Medium Enterprises (CNA). In 1969, he moved to the Provincial Union of Traders, then to Confesercenti, where he became the provincial director. From 1981 to 1984, he worked at the regional secretariat of Confesercenti in Tuscany, while from 1988 he held the position of provincial secretary of the CNA.

He entered politics with the Democratic Party of the Left, serving as an assessor in Grosseto from 1993 to 1997 in the administration led by mayor Loriano Valentini. In the 1999 provincial elections in Grosseto, Scheggi was a candidate for the presidency of the province supported by the Democrats of the Left, the Italian People's Party, Communist Refoundation, Italian Republican Party, the Italian Democratic Socialists, and the Democrats. On 13 June 1999, he was elected president of the Province of Grosseto in the first round with over 54% of the votes.

He was re-elected president of the province in the 2004 election, receiving 58% of the votes representing a center-left coalition. In the provincial council, he was supported for his second term by a majority made up of the Democrats of the Left, The Daisy, Communist Refoundation, and the Italian Democratic Socialists. At the end of his term, which expired in June 2009, he announced his retirement from politics. He was subsequently appointed as a member of the general board of the Fondazione Monte dei Paschi di Siena.

In February 2016, he was appointed vice-president of the historical institute ISGREC. In September 2021, he was appointed president of the same institute following the resignation of Paolo Passaniti.

== Bibliography ==
- Bonifazi, Emilio (2015). Grosseto e i suoi amministratori dal 1944 al 2015. Grosseto: Innocenti Editore.

Political offices
Preceded by Stefano Gentili	President of the Province of Grosseto; 1999–2009	Succeeded by Leonardo Marras
