= Lorenzo Nelli =

Italian magistrate and politician (1809–1878)

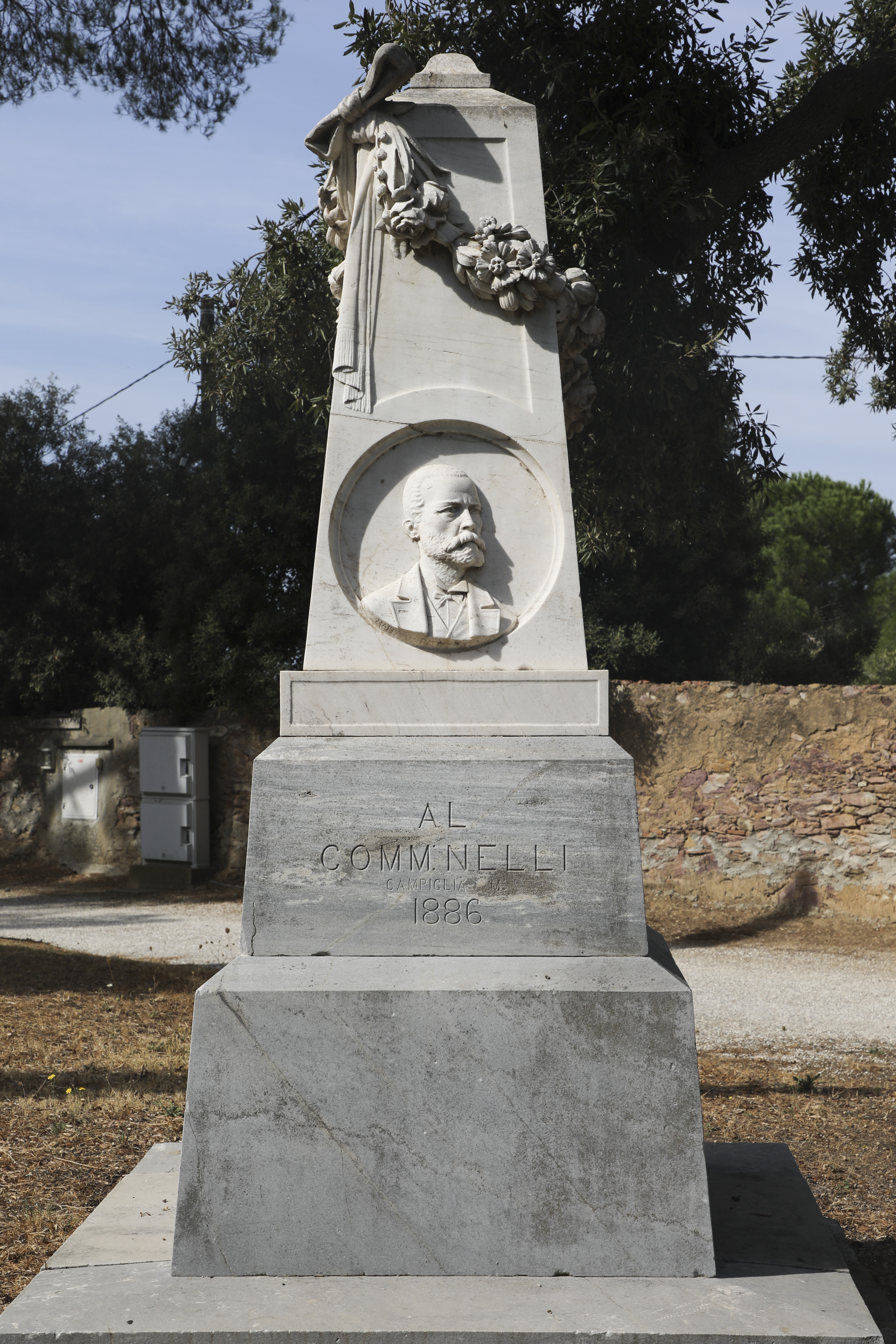
- Monument to Nelli in Campiglia Marittima, by sculptor Raffaello Battelli (1886)

Member of the Chamber of Deputies
- In office 27 April 1861 – 7 September 1865
- Constituency: Volterra
- In office 11 March 1872 – 5 April 1878
- Constituency: Grosseto

Personal details
- Born: 17 August 1809 Campiglia Marittima, Grand Duchy of Tuscany
- Died: 5 April 1878 (aged 68) Florence, Kingdom of Italy
- Profession: Magistrate

Lorenzo Nelli (17 August 1809 – 5 April 1878) was an Italian magistrate and politician who played a role in the Tuscan national movement and later served in the Chamber of Deputies of the Kingdom of Italy. He held several judicial offices and contributed to institutional reforms in the early years of Italian unification.

== Life and career ==
Nelli was born in Campiglia Marittima on 17 August 1809 to Giuseppe Nelli and Laura Pisanelli. He graduated in civil and canon law at the University of Pisa on 23 June 1829 under Mariano Grassini.

He began his career in the judiciary with his appointment as second substitute of the royal prosecutor at the Court of First Instance of Pisa, residing in Pontremoli, in 1839. He later advanced to the position of prosecutor general at the Court of Appeal of Lucca from 1862 to 1866.

Nelli took part in the Tuscan national movement. In 1848 and 1849 he served as a deputy in the Tuscan Assembly. He was again elected in 1859 and was a member of the commission tasked with studying the Tuscan penitentiary system. In 1859, following annextation to the Kingdom of Sardinia, he was appointed to direct the General Directorate of the Ministry of Grace and Justice during the provisional government.

In the first Italian Parliament, Nelli was elected deputy in the 8th legislature for the constituency of Volterra. He also served as a member of the special commission for the Code of Civil Procedure in 1865, and as a member of the High Court of Justice of the Senate which tried admiral Carlo Pellion di Persano.

After losing his parliamentary seat, Nelli returned to judicial service as prosecutor general at the Court of Appeal of Florence (1866–1869) and later at L'Aquila (1869). Retired in 1871, he declined an offer to return to service as prosecutor general at the Court of Appeal of Naples.

In February 1872, he was elected again to the Chamber of Deputies for the 11th legislature in a by-election, replacing Giovanni Morandini in the constituency of Grosseto. He was subsequently re-elected for the 12th and 13th legislatures.

Nelli died in Florence on 5 April 1878.

== Sources ==
- Storia dei collegi elettorali 1848–1897. Rome: Ministero dell'agricoltura, industria e commercio. 1898. p. 308.
- "Notizie degli archivi toscani". Archivio storico italiano. 114 (410–411). 1956.
- Barsanti, Danilo (2015). Lorenzo Nelli. Politica e magistratura nell'Italia post-unitaria. Pisa: ETS.
