= Maurizio Rasero =

Italian politician (born 1973)

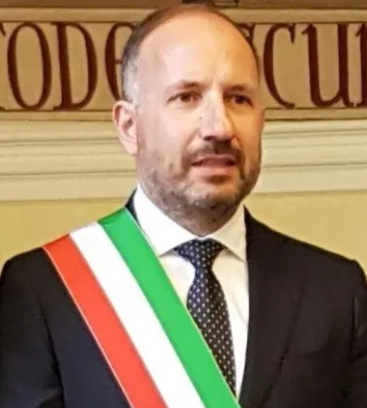
- Maurizio Rasero

President of the Province of Asti
- In office 13 September 2022 – 27 April 2026
- Preceded by: Paolo Lanfranco
- Succeeded by: Simone Nosenzo

Mayor of Asti
- Incumbent
- Assumed office 27 June 2017
- Preceded by: Fabrizio Brignolo

Personal details
- Born: 30 October 1973 (age 52) Asti, Italy
- Party: Forza Italia (2009); The People of Freedom (2009–2013); Forza Italia (2013–present)
- Occupation: politician
- Website: raserosindaco.it

Maurizio Rasero (born 30 October 1973) is an Italian politician. He is member of the centre-right party Forza Italia.

He has been a young member of Forza Italia since he was a member of the municipal council of Asti elected in 2002. Rasero ran for mayor of Asti at the 2017 local elections, supported by a centre-right coalition, and he was elected on 27 June 2017.

In September 2022, Rasero was also elected president of the Province of Asti.

== See also ==
- 2017 Italian local elections
- List of mayors of Asti

Political offices
Preceded by Fabrizio Brignolo	Mayor of Asti since 2017	Succeeded by
