= List of presidents of the Province of Asti =

President of the Province of Asti
- Presidente della Provincia di Asti
- Incumbent; Simone Nosenzo since 21 June 2026
- Term length: 4 years
- Formation: 1935

The president of the Province of Asti is the head of the provincial government in Asti, Piedmont, Italy. The president oversees the administration of the province, coordinates the activities of the municipalities, and represents the province in regional and national matters. It was created in 1935.

Since June 2026, the office has been held by Simone Nosenzo of the centre-right coalition.

== List ==
=== Presidents of the Provincial Rectorate (1935–1943) ===
No.	Portrait	Name	Term of office		Party
No.	Portrait	Name	Start	End	Party
–		Giuseppe Vassallo	15 April 1935	19 February 1936	Royal commissioner
1		Lamberto Vallarino Gancia	20 February 1936	30 September 1943	National Fascist Party
–		Matteo Dardanello	1 October 1943	20 October 1943	Prefectural commissioner
–		Rodolfo Saporiti	21 October 1943	15 January 1944	Prefectural commissioner
–		Arturo Vacca Maggiolini	16 January 1944	23 March 1945	Extraordinary commissioner
–		Stefano Lorenzi	29 March 1945	24 April 1945	Prefectural commissioner

=== Presidents of the Provincial Deputation (1945–1951) ===
No.	Portrait	Name	Term of office		Party
No.	Portrait	Name	Start	End	Party
1		Giovanni Battista Torta	25 April 1945	4 June 1949	
2		Umberto Grilli	4 June 1949	9 July 1951	Italian Democratic Socialist Party

=== Presidents of the Province (1951–present) ===
No.	Portrait	Name	Term of office		Party
No.	Portrait	Name	Start	End	Party
1		Norberto Saracco	10 July 1951	17 December 1960	Christian Democracy
2		Giovanni Amasio	17 December 1960	16 February 1964	Christian Democracy
3		Pietro Andriano	16 February 1965	25 August 1980	Christian Democracy
4		Guglielmo Tovo	25 August 1980	16 July 1990	Christian Democracy
5		Luciano Grasso	14 February 1994	8 May 1995	Italian Liberal Party
6		Giuseppe Goria	8 May 1995	28 June 1999	Democratic Party of the Left
7		Roberto Marmo	28 June 1999	14 June 2004	Forza Italia
7		Roberto Marmo	14 June 2004	13 February 2008	Forza Italia
–		Mario Spanu	13 February 2008	29 April 2008	Prefectural commissioner
8		Maria Teresa Armosino	29 April 2008	30 October 2012	The People of Freedom
–		Alberto Ardia	30 October 2012	8 July 2014	Prefectural commissioner
–		Alfredo Nappi	8 July 2014	13 October 2014	Prefectural commissioner
9		Fabrizio Brignolo	13 October 2014	20 March 2015	Democratic Party
–		Marco Gabusi	20 March 2015	14 Novembre 2016	Forza Italia
10		Marco Gabusi	14 November 2016	27 May 2019	Forza Italia
–		Paolo Lanfranco	27 May 2019	29 July 2019	Lega Nord
11		Paolo Lanfranco	29 July 2019	13 June 2022	Lega Nord
–		Davide Massaglia (acting)	13 June 2022	13 September 2022	Civic list
12		Maurizio Rasero	13 September 2022	27 April 2026	Forza Italia
–		Simone Nosenzo	27 April 2026	21 June 2026	Independent (centre-right)
13		Simone Nosenzo	21 June 2026	Incumbent	Independent (centre-right)

== Sources ==
- "Storia amministrativa dell'ente". Ministero dell'Interno.
- Aldo Gamba. "Provincia. Nascita, vita e requiem di un ente". Astigiani.
- "Il giorno del Consiglio provinciale". La Stampa. Turin. 15 July 1999. p. 36.
