= Giovanni Morandini =

Italian engineer and politician

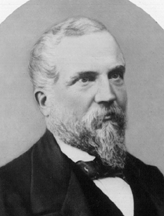

Member of the Italian Senate
- In office 25 November 1883 – 14 September 1888

Member of the Chamber of Deputies of the Kingdom of Italy
- In office 18 February 1861 – 7 September 1865
- In office 5 December 1870 – 17 January 1872
- Constituency: Grosseto

Member of the Chamber of Deputies of the Kingdom of Sardinia
- In office 25 March 1860 – 17 December 1860
- Constituency: Massa Marittima

President of the Provincial Council of Grosseto
- In office 1865 – September 1866
- Preceded by: Lorenzo Grottanelli
- Succeeded by: Bernardino Martinucci
- In office 1877 – 14 September 1888
- Preceded by: Gaspero Petruccioli
- Succeeded by: Ciro Aldi Mai

Personal details
- Born: 6 January 1816 Pereta, Grand Duchy of Tuscany
- Died: 14 September 1888 (aged 72) Florence, Kingdom of Italy
- Occupation: Engineer

Giovanni Morandini (6 January 1816 – 14 September 1888) was an Italian engineer and politician.

== Life and career ==
Morandini was born in Pereta, in the Grand Duchy of Tuscany, in 1816, to Giuseppe Morandini and Marianna Traversi. He obtained a degree in mathematics from the University of Pisa on 21 November 1843 and later earned a degree in engineering from the École polytechnique in Paris in 1845.

In 1846, he was arrested by Austrian authorities for visiting the mother of the Bandiera brothers in Venice, causing liberal protests and drawing the intervention of Giuseppe Mazzini. He was released in September 1847, thanks to the intervention of his uncle, Giovanni Maria Traversi, bishop of Massa Marittima and Populonia.

In 1848, he fought as a volunteer in the first Italian War of Independence, was wounded at Montanara and captured, and later freed. He was then elected to the Tuscan Assembly in 1848, subsequently to the Constituent Assembly, and finally to the Tuscan Assembly of 1859. After the annexation of Tuscany, he was elected to the Chamber of Deputies of the Kingdom of Sardinia during the 7th legislature in 1860, representing the Massa Marittima constituency.

After the proclamation of the Kingdom of Italy, he served as a member of the Chamber of Deputies during the 8th and 11th legislatures, representing Grosseto. He resigned on 17 January 1872 and was replaced by Lorenzo Nelli. He also served as president of the Provincial Council of Grosseto from 1865 to 1866 and again from 1877 to 1888.

On 25 November 1883, Morandini was appointed senator, serving until his death in 1888.

He was also active in railway administration, serving on the boards of national railway companies.

== Honours ==
- Officer of the Order of Saints Maurice and Lazarus
- Officer of the Order of the Crown of Italy
- Commemorative Medal of the Italian Wars of Independence (three clasps)
- Medal in memory of the Unification of Italy

== Sources ==
- Storia dei collegi elettorali 1848–1897. Parte II. Rome: Ministero dell'agricoltura, industria e commercio. 1898. pp. 307–308.
- Badii, Gaetano (1930). "Giovanni Morandini". In Rosi, Michele (ed.). Dizionario del Risorgimento nazionale. Vol. 3. Milan: Vallardi. pp. 639–640.
- Menghini, Mario (1934). "MORANDINI, Giovanni". Enciclopedia Italiana. Rome: Treccani.
