= Raffaello Bellucci =

Italian partisan and politician (1904–1981)

President of the Province of Grosseto
- In office 1947–1948
- Preceded by: Giovanni Magrassi
- Succeeded by: Dante Evangelisti

Member of the Chamber of Deputies
- In office 1948–1953

Personal details
- Born: 25 April 1904 Orbetello, Province of Grosseto, Kingdom of Italy
- Died: 10 January 1981 (aged 76)
- Party: Italian Communist Party
- Occupation: Employee

Raffaello Bellucci (25 April 1904 – 10 January 1981) was an Italian partisan and politician. A member of the Italian Communist Party, he took part to the Resistance movement under the name of "Franco Nello". He served as president of the Province of Grosseto from 1947 to 1948, and Deputy in the first legislature of the Republic of Italy (1948–1953).

== Biography ==
With a background in republicanism, Bellucci moved to France in 1931. In 1932, he returned to Italy, to Grosseto, where he was arrested for anti-fascist activities. In 1934, as a free citizen, he went back to France, residing in Nice, where he established connections with communist activists in exile. Monitored by the OVRA (fascist secret police) in the following years, he was arrested in Menton in 1943 and released in August of the same year.

He participated in the resistance movement under the name "Franco Nello," and at the end of the conflict, he was appointed secretary of the Communist Federation of Grosseto.

He was elected as a deputy for the Italian Communist Party (PCI) in the first legislature of the Republic. It was not re-elected in the second legislature.

Political offices
Preceded by Giovanni Magrassi	President of the Province of Grosseto; 1947–1948	Succeeded by Dante Evangelisti
