= Hubert Corsi =

Italian politician (born 1938)

Umberto Hubert Corsi
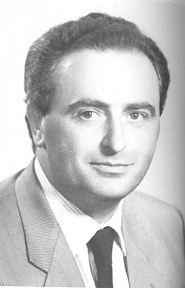

Member of the Chamber of Deputies
- In office 1983–1994

Mayor of Monte Argentario
- In office 3 August 1985 – 16 July 1990
- Preceded by: Florio Zolesi
- Succeeded by: Benito Grassi
- In office 18 February 1991 – 24 April 1995
- Preceded by: Benito Grassi
- Succeeded by: Marco Visconti

Member of the Provincial Council of Grosseto
- In office 4 July 1999 – 14 June 2004

Personal details
- Born: 30 October 1938 (age 87) Grosseto, Kingdom of Italy
- Party: Christian Democracy; Italian People's Party; Christian Democratic Centre

Umberto 'Hubert' Corsi (born 30 October 1938) is an Italian politician who served as a Deputy (1983–1994) and mayor of Monte Argentario (1985–1990, 1991–1995).
