= Gino Filippini (politician) =

Italian politician and partisan

Regional assessor for Urban planning and Social housing of Tuscany
- In office 28 July 1970 – 28 July 1975
- President: Lelio Lagorio

Member of the Regional Council of Tuscany
- In office 1970–1975

Mayor of Abetone
- In office 1975–1980

Personal details
- Born: 8 February 1919 Campo Tizzoro, Kingdom of Italy
- Died: 4 November 2004 (aged 85) Porretta Terme, Emilia-Romagna, Italy
- Party: Italian Communist Party

Gino Filippini (8 February 1919 – 4 November 2004) was an Italian politician and partisan. A member of the Italian Communist Party, he participated in the Italian Resistance during World War II and later served as a regional councillor and regional assessor in the first legislature of Tuscany.

== Life and career ==
Born in Campo Tizzoro, near San Marcello Pistoiese, Filippini became active in the clandestine Italian Communist Party (PCI) during the Fascist period. During the final years of World War II he was a member of the local Committee of National Liberation (CLN) in San Marcello Pistoiese and commanded the Squadre di Azione Patriottica (SAP) in Campo Tizzoro.

After the war, Filippini served as secretary of the Pistoia federation of the PCI from 1949 to 1955, and directed La Voce, the federation's weekly newspaper. He later became a member of the party's regional secretariat. According to the testimony of Carlo Galluzzi, regional secretary of the Tuscan PCI from 1960 to 1964, Filippini was regarded as a "Soviet-type" cadre, "trained in the Moscow school", and was transferred to the regional secretariat after losing support within the Pistoia party federation.

In 1970, he was elected to the Regional Council of Tuscany and served as regional assessor for Urban planning and Social housing in the first Tuscan regional government, led by president Lelio Lagorio.

From 1975 to 1980, Filippini was mayor of Abetone. He was also a member of the governing council of the Tuscan Institute for the History of the Resistance and later served as provincial president of the National Association of Italian Partisans (ANPI) in Pistoia.

Filippini died in Porretta Terme on 4 November 2004.

== Sources ==
- Baccetti, Carlo (June 2005). "Le prime elezioni regionali in Toscana (1970 e 1975): formazione e tipologia di un nuovo ceto politico". Quaderni dell'Osservatorio Elettorale – Italian Journal of Electoral Studies. 53 (1): 5–62. doi:10.36253/qoe-12722.
- Grassi, Giovanni, ed. (1993). Resistenza e storia d'Italia. Quarant'anni di vita dell'Istituto nazionale e degli istituti associati. Annuario 1949–1989. Milan: FrancoAngeli.
- Risaliti, Roberto (1976). Antifascismo e Resistenza nel pistoiese. Pistoia: Tellini.
