= Fabrizio Brignolo =

Italian politician

President of the Province of Asti
- In office 13 October 2014 – 20 March 2015
- Preceded by: Maria Teresa Armosino
- Succeeded by: Marco Gabusi

Mayor of Asti
- In office 22 May 2012 – 27 June 2017
- Preceded by: Giorgio Galvagno
- Succeeded by: Maurizio Rasero

Personal details
- Born: 1 December 1968 (age 57) Asti, Italy
- Party: Democrats of the Left; Democratic Party
- Profession: Lawyer

Fabrizio Brignolo (born 1 December 1968) is an Italian politician of the Democratic Party. He was elected mayor of Asti on 21 May 2012 and took office on 22 May.

Brignolo served as president of the Province of Asti from October 2014 to March 2015.

Political offices
Preceded by Giorgio Galvagno	Mayor of Asti; 2012–2017	Succeeded by Maurizio Rasero
Preceded by Maria Teresa Armosino	President of the Province of Asti; 2014–2015	Succeeded by Marco Gabusi
