= Umberto Grilli =

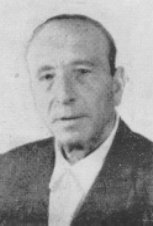

Member of the Constituent Assembly
- In office 9 June 1946 – 31 January 1948
- Constituency: Cuneo

Member of the Chamber of Deputies
- In office 1 December 1919 – 7 April 1921
- Constituency: Siena–Arezzo–Grosseto

President of the Province of Asti
- In office 4 June 1949 – 1951
- Preceded by: Giovanni Battista Torta
- Succeeded by: Norberto Saracco

President of the Provincial Council of Grosseto
- In office 1920–1922
- Preceded by: Emilio Ginanneschi

Personal details
- Born: 31 January 1882 Volterra, Province of Pisa, Kingdom of Italy
- Died: 26 October 1951 (aged 69) Asti, Italy
- Party: Italian Socialist Party; Italian Democratic Socialist Party
- Profession: Lawyer

Umberto Grilli (31 January 1882 – 26 October 1951) was an Italian politician and lawyer who served in both the Chamber of Deputies of the Kingdom of Italy and the Constituent Assembly of Italy, and later as president of the Province of Asti.

== Life and career ==
Grilli was born in Volterra into a family of alabaster artisans. In 1894 he founded Il Martello, the first socialist weekly in Volterra, advocating anti‑militarist positions and opposing Italy's involvement in the Italo-Turkish War and later in World War I.

He served as president of the Provincial Council of Grosseto and was elected to the Chamber of Deputies for the 25th legislature (1919–1921). A reformist socialist, he was a vocal opponent of fascism during his time in Parliament, and in June 1921 he faced hostility from squadrist groups who raided his office and home in Grosseto.

After World War II, Grilli was elected to the Constituent Assembly of Italy. He later joined the Italian Democratic Socialist Party and played an active role in debates on Articles 7 and 29 of the Italian Constitution.

Grilli settled in Asti, where he served as a city councillor from 1946 to 1951 and as president of the Province of Asti from 4 June 1949 to 1951.
