= 1970 Tuscan regional election =

15 June 1970	1975 →
- All 50 seats to the Regional Council of Tuscany
Party	Vote %	Seats
PCI	42.3%	23
DC	30.5%	17
PSI	8.7%	3
PSU	6.4%	3
MSI	3.8%	1
PSIUP	3.1%	1
PLI	2.6%	1
PRI	2.2%	1
This lists parties that won seats. See the complete results below.
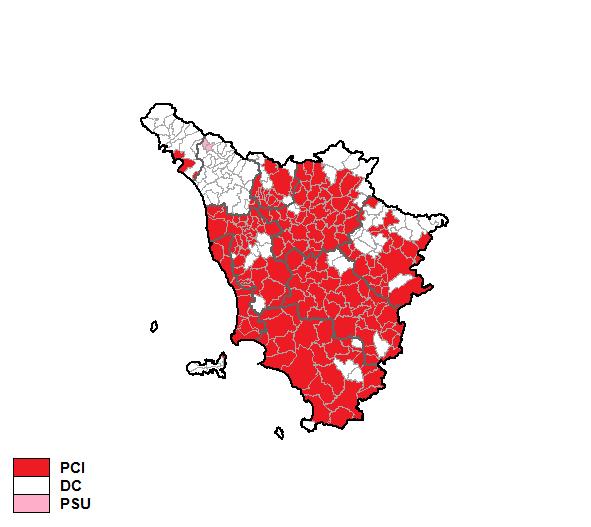
Major party in each municipality.

The Tuscan regional election of 1970 took place on 7–8 June 1970. It was the first-ever regional election.

== Electoral law ==
Election was held under proportional representation with provincial constituencies where the largest remainder method with a Droop quota was used. To ensure more proportionality, remained votes and seats were transferred at regional level and calculated at-large.

== Results ==
The Italian Communist Party was by far the largest party. After the election, the Communists formed a left-wing coalition government with the Italian Socialist Party and the Italian Socialist Party of Proletarian Unity. Lelio Lagorio, a Socialist, was elected President of the Region.

Parties	votes	votes (%)	seats
Italian Communist Party	985,382	42.3	23
Christian Democracy	710,908	30.5	17
Italian Socialist Party	203,560	8.7	3
Unitary Socialist Party	148,946	6.4	3
Italian Social Movement	88,876	3.8	1
Italian Socialist Party of Proletarian Unity	73,947	3.1	1
Italian Liberal Party	61,298	2.6	1
Italian Republican Party	51,954	2.2	1
Italian Democratic Party of Monarchist Unity	2,309	0.1	-
Red Star	1,016	0.0	-
Total	2,328,196	100.0	50

Source: Ministry of the Interior
