= Montevarchi =

- Comune
- Comune di Montevarchi
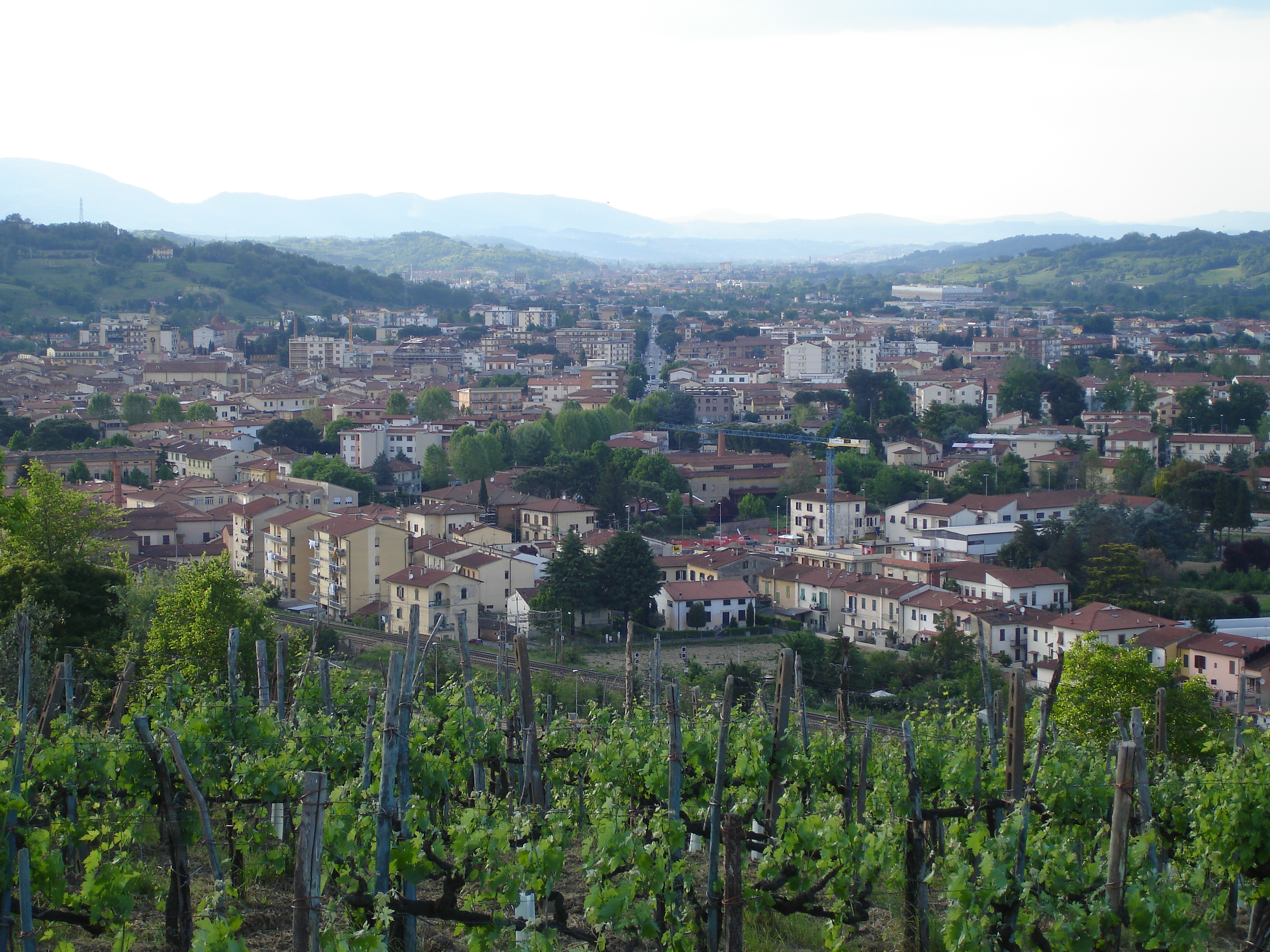
- Montevarchi in May 2008

- Coat of arms

- Location within Italy Location within Tuscany
- Coordinates: 43°31′43″N 11°34′12″E
- Country: Italy
- Region: Tuscany
- Province: Arezzo (AR)
- Frazioni: Caposelvi, Pestello, Levane, Levanella, Mercatale Valdarno, Moncioni, Rendola, Ricasoli, San Marco, San Tommè, Ventena

Government
  - Mayor: Silvia Chiassai Martini

Area
  - Total: 56.67 km^{2} (21.88 sq mi)
- Elevation: 144 m (472 ft)

Population (1 January 2018)
  - Total: 24,440
  - Density: 431.3/km^{2} (1,117/sq mi)
- Demonym: Montevarchini
- Time zone: UTC+1 (CET)
  - Summer (DST): UTC+2 (CEST)
- Postal code: 52025
- Dialing code: 055
- Patron saint: Saint Lawrence
- Saint day: 10 August
- Website: Official website

Montevarchi is a town and comune in the province of Arezzo, Tuscany, Italy.

== History ==
The town of Montevarchi sprang up around 1100, near to a fortified Benedictine monastery, founded by bishop Elempert (986–1010) of Arezzo. At first the castle belonged to the Marquis Bourbon del Monte di Santa Maria, then to the Count Guidi family. In 1273 ownership passed to the Signoria of Florence. One of the town's first podestà (mayor) was Brunetto Latini.

During the rule of the Medici, the town expanded considerably due to its flourishing agricultural trade and its wool and silk industries, controlled by the Woolmaker's Guild. Montevarchi remained under Florentine control until the end of the first half of the 18th century; then the town became part of the territory of Arezzo.

After the unification of Italy, it became an important centre for manufacture of felt hats and, during the post World War II period, of shoes, hats, ladies' and children's wear. Today it is still a clothes production hub, while also important in the production of electricity (one hydroelectric and one thermoelectric plant).

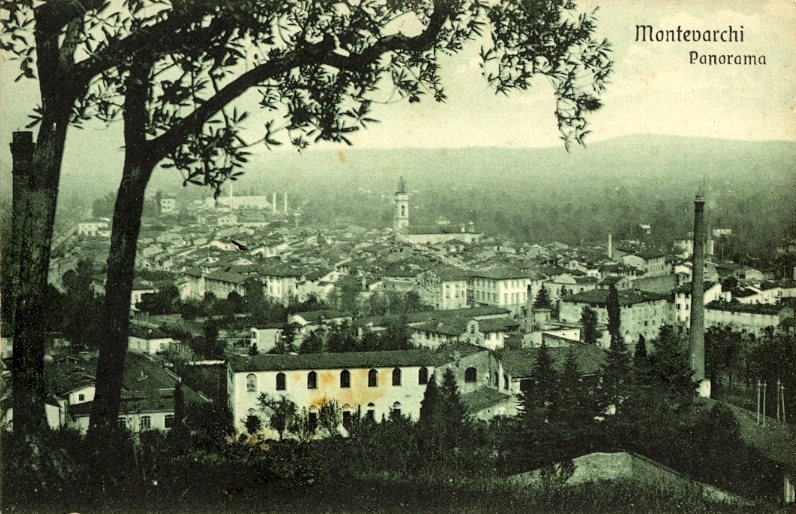
Montevarchi at the beginning of the 20th century.

== Geography ==
The comune is bordered by Bucine, Cavriglia, Gaiole in Chianti, Pergine Valdarno, San Giovanni Valdarno and Terranuova Bracciolini.

== Main sights ==
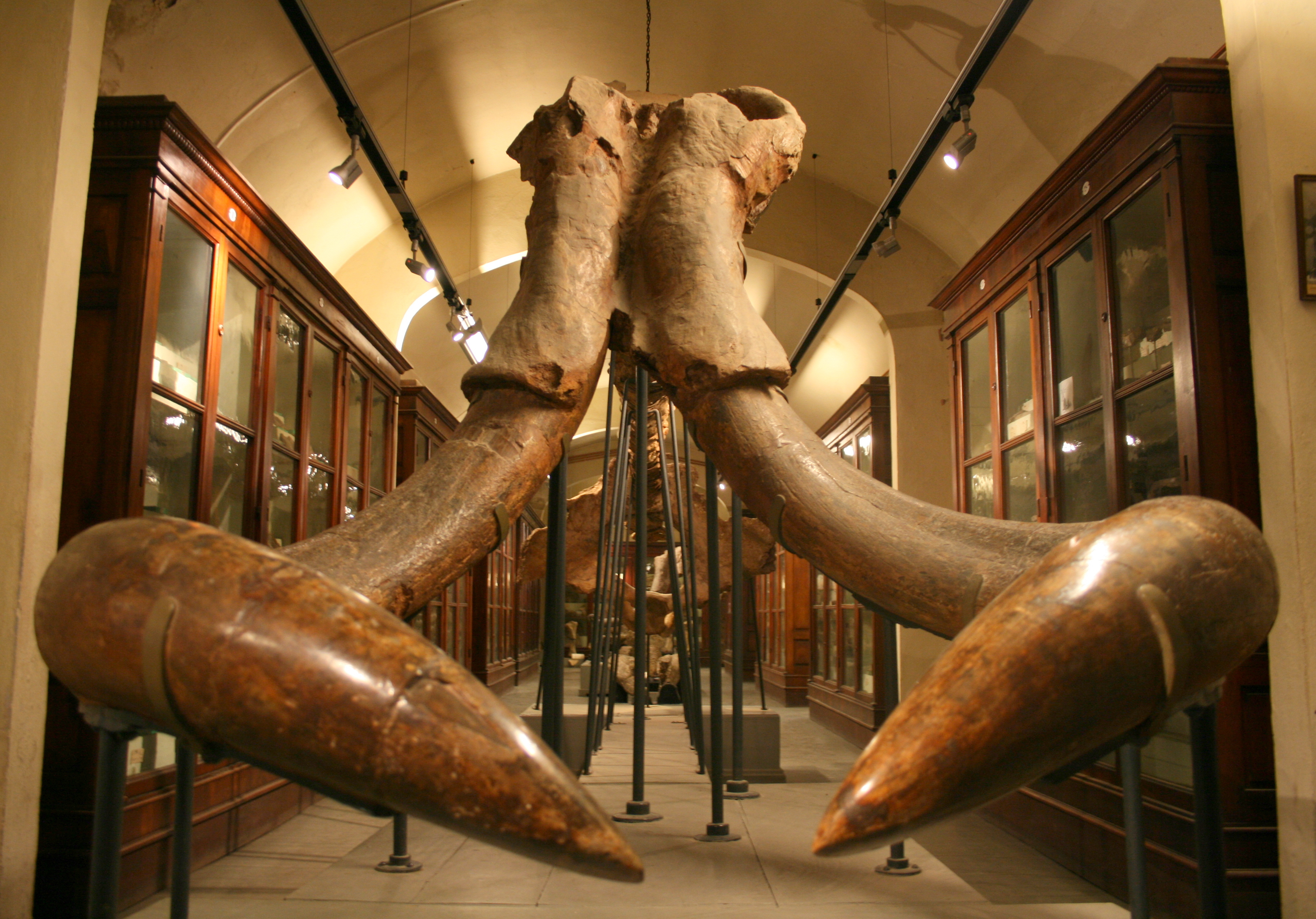
Museo Paleontologico

=== Churches ===
- Collegiata di San Lorenzo. A church at this site was initially founded in the 13th century. A "collegiate church" was erected in 1561 by Pope Pius IV and the Grand Duke Cosimo de' Medici appointed Benedetto Varchi as the first magistrate of this church. Originally built in Romanesque style, the church was totally refurbished by Massimiliano Soldani Benzi in 1709 which gave it a decisive, but delicate, Baroque touch. San Lorenzo's main treasure is the Relic of the Holy Milk which, according to tradition, was given to Count Guido Guerra, Lord of Montevarchi, by Charles I of Naples on 26 February 1266 after the victorious Battle of Benevento, when Guido Guerra successfully led a Guelph formation of heavy cavalry against an onslaught.
- Church of Santa Maria al Giglio. The construction was begun in 1589 after a series of miracles attributed to the fresco that now is above the main altar. These so-called miracles were, in fact, part of an elaborate hoax organized by the Fraternita del Sacro Latte, a powerful local religious brotherhood, in order to increase the value of their properties in the area.
- Chiostro di Cennano. The Cloister of Cennano was formerly part of the Franciscan convent of San Ludovico suppressed in 1808. Typically Tuscan, it has the date 1471 carved in one of the capitals. The door of the cloister is dated 1522.
- The Holy Milk Relic Chapel or Della Robbia Temple was reconstructed in 1973 in the Museum of Collegiata to house the recovered original 15th-century ceramic sculptures by Andrea della Robbia, removed from the church in 1709 and walled up for two centuries in the sacristy.

=== Museums ===
- Accademia Valdarnese del Poggio Library. The Library of the Academy, founded in 1805, contains 20,000 volumes, various incunabula and manuscripts including a valuable 15th century copy of The Decameron.

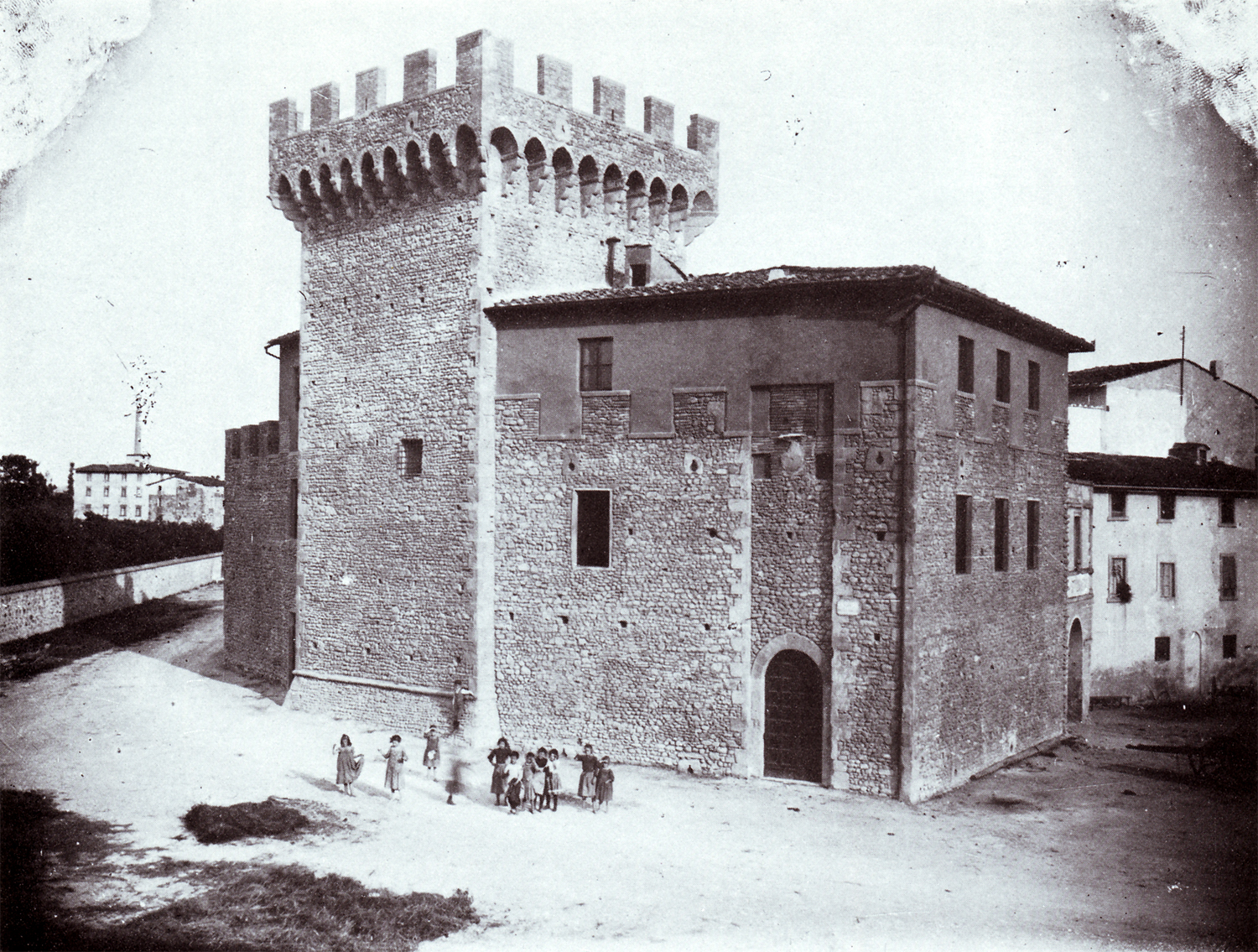
The cassero, barracks of granducal Montevarchi's garrison.

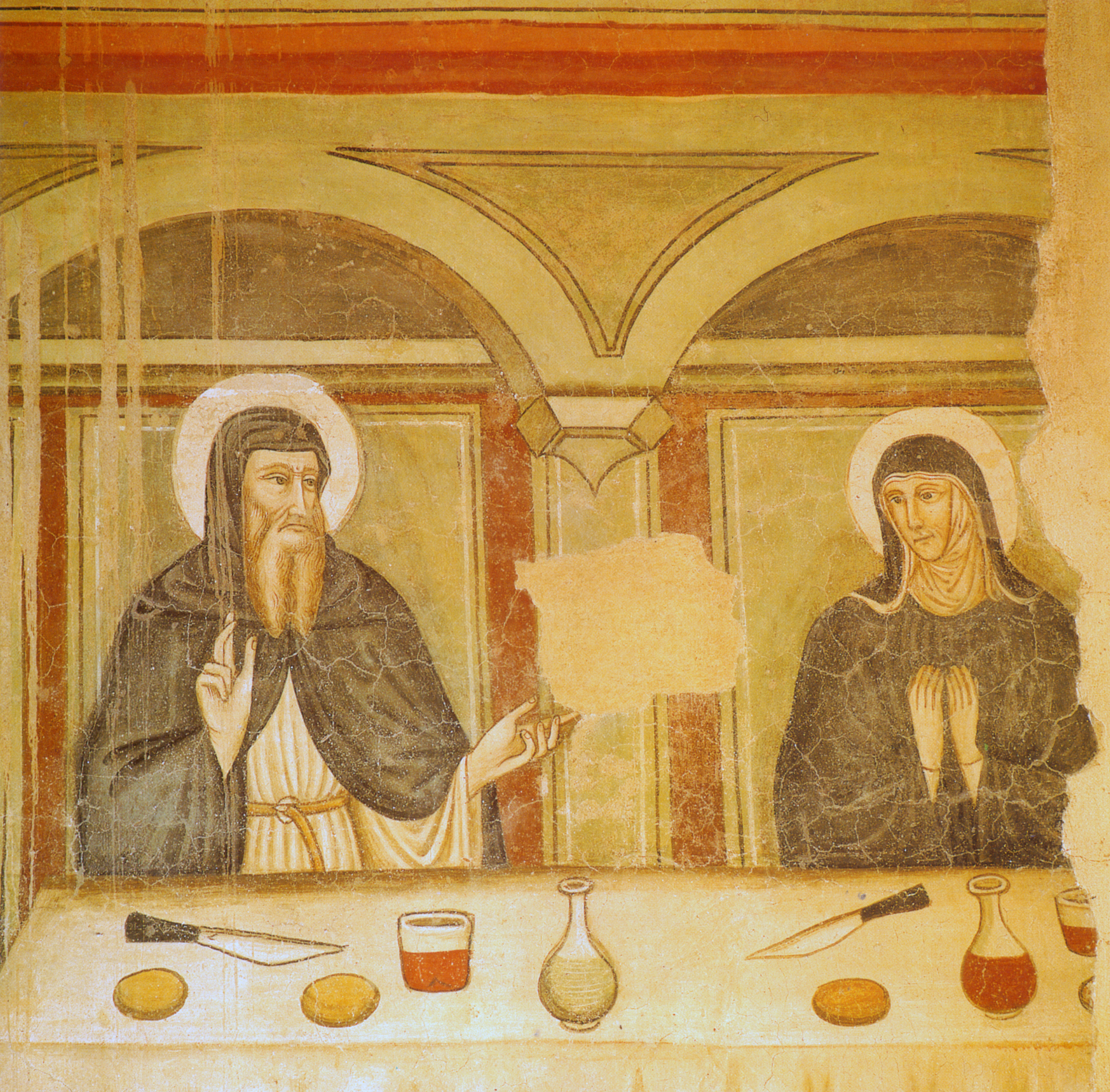
14th-century fresco in La Ginestra Monastery.

- Museo Paleontologico. The Paleontology Museum is housed in the ex-Franciscan convent of San Ludovico. The museum hosts about 1,600 fossils with samples of flora and fauna. Nearly all the fossils come from the Upper Valdarno area and date back to a period of time between upper Pliocene and lower Pleistocene. The poster for the exhibition is the original one made in 1819 by Georges Cuvier.
- Museo d'Arte Sacra. The Museum of Sacred Arts of the Collegiate Church of San Lorenzo houses sculptures, frescoes, crafted gold objects, ornaments, relics and manuscripts. Of particular interest are the liturgical objects commissioned by the local Holy Milk Brotherhood and notably the ceramic sculpture by Andrea della Robbia.
- Museo Ernesto Galeffi. This museum is dedicated to the artist for whom it is named who died in 1986 and hosts a huge collection of Galeffi's works donated to the community, housed in a villa donated by the Galeffi-Benini family. Ernesto Galeffi started as a graphic designer, then moved to painting and finally turned to sculpture. The museum, opened in 2001, holds 60 sculptures, 10 paintings and more than 2,000 drawings.

== International relations ==
=== Sister cities ===
Montevarchi is twinned with:

- Kitzingen, Germany, since 1984
- Roanne, France, since 1988
- Bethlehem, Palestine, since 1993
- Bir Lehlou, Western Sahara, since 1998

=== Cooperation ===
- Kanougou, Burkina Faso, since 1991
- Slawharad, Belarus, since 2002
- Rahat, Israel, since 2005
- Lehavim, Israel, since 2008

== Notable people ==
- Sara Ducci, physicist, born in Montevarchi
- Francesco Failli, road racing cyclist, was born in Montevarchi.
- Francesco Mochi, sculptor, was born in Montevarchi.
- Luca Canonici, opera singer, was born in Montevarchi.

== Sources ==
- Leone Ugo Masini (1960). Montevarchi attraverso i secoli. Florence: Bemporad Marzocco. OCLC 875201438. (in Italian)
- Grazia Gobbi (1986). Montevarchi, profilo di storia urbana. Florence: Alinea. OCLC 888740348. (in Italian)
- Anna Maria Massinelli (1998). Montevarchi. Translated by Graham Sells. Florence: Franco Cantini Editore. ISBN 978-88-80-30140-0. OCLC 40173775. (in English and Italian)
