= Medical education =

Education related to the practice of being a medical practitioner

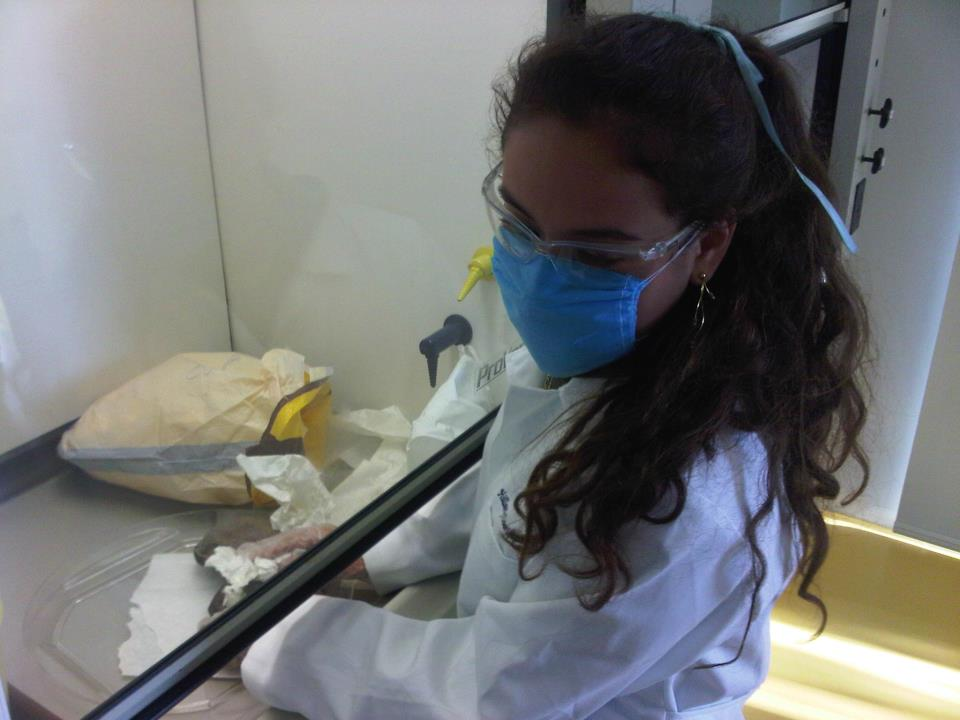
Medical student in a laboratory at Monterrey Institute of Technology and Higher Education, Mexico City

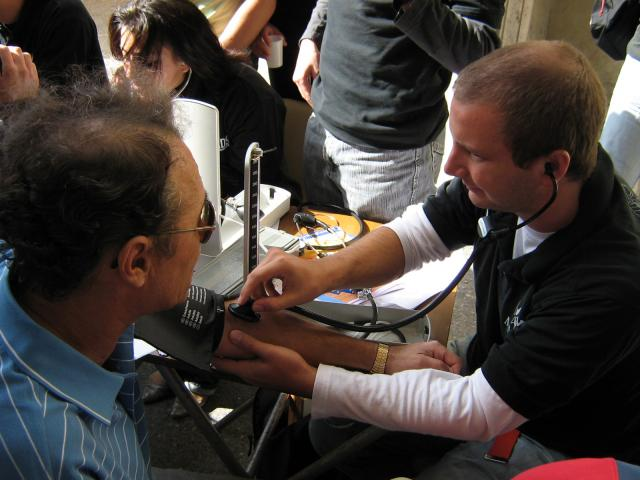
Medical Student taking blood pressure during awareness campaign event

Medical education is education related to the practice of being a medical practitioner, including the initial training to become a physician (i.e., medical school and internship) and additional training thereafter (e.g., residency, fellowship, and continuing medical education).

Medical education and training varies considerably across the world. Various teaching methodologies have been used in medical education, which is an active area of educational research.

Medical education is also the subject-didactic academic field of educating medical doctors at all levels, including entry-level, post-graduate, and continuing medical education. Specific requirements such as entrustable professional activities must be met before moving on in stages of medical education.

== Common techniques and evidence base ==
Medical education applies theories of pedagogy specifically in the context of medical education. Medical education has been a leader in the field of evidence-based education, through the development of evidence syntheses such as the Best Evidence Medical Education collection, formed in 1999, which aimed to "move from opinion-based education to evidence-based education". Common evidence-based techniques include the Objective structured clinical examination (OSCE) to assess clinical skills, and reliable checklist-based assessments to determine the development of soft skills such as professionalism. However, there is a persistence of ineffective instructional methods in medical education, such as the matching of teaching to learning styles and Edgar Dales' "Cone of Learning".

== Entry-level education ==
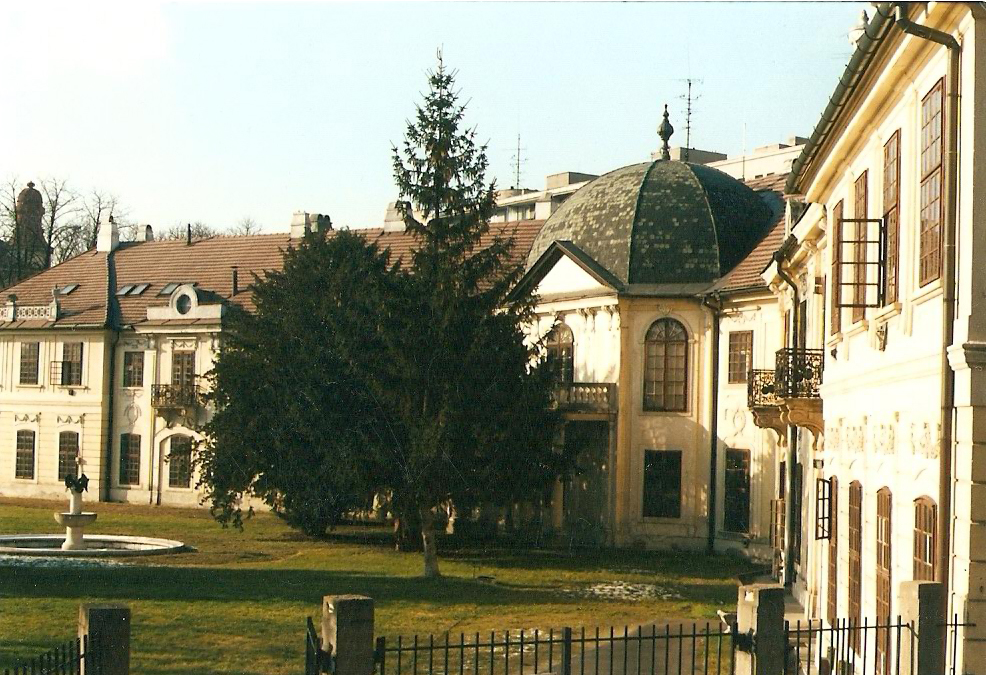
Faculty of Medicine (Comenius University in Bratislava) Slovakia

Entry-level medical education programs are tertiary-level courses undertaken at a medical school. Depending on jurisdiction and university, these may be either undergraduate-entry (most of Europe, Asia, South America and Oceania), or graduate-entry programs (mainly Australia, Philippines and North America). Some jurisdictions and universities provide both undergraduate entry programs and graduate entry programs (Australia, South Korea).

In general, initial training is taken at medical school. Traditionally entry-level medical education is divided between preclinical and clinical studies. The former consists of the basic sciences such as anatomy, physiology, biochemistry, pharmacology, pathology, microbiology. The latter consists of teaching in the various areas of clinical medicine such as internal medicine, pediatrics, obstetrics and gynecology, psychiatry, general practice and surgery. More recently, there have been significant efforts in the United States to integrate health systems science (HSS) as the "third pillar" of medical education, alongside preclinical and clinical studies. HSS is a foundational platform and framework for the study and understanding of how care is delivered, how health professionals work together to deliver that care, and how the health system can improve patient care and health care delivery.

The Liaison Committee on Medical Education (LMCE) is a committee of educational accreditation for schools of medicine leading to an MD in the United States and Canada. In order to maintain accreditation, medical schools are required to ensure that students meet a certain set of standards and competencies, defined by the accreditation committees. The "Function and Structure of a Medical School" article is a yearly published article from the LCME that defines 12 accreditation standards.

The Association of American Medical Colleges (AAMC) has recommended thirteen Entrustable Professional Activities (EPAs) that medical students should be expected to accomplish prior to beginning a residency program. EPAs are based on the integrated core competencies developed over the course of medical school training. Each EPA lists its key feature, associated competencies, and observed behaviors required for completion of that activity. The students progress through levels of understanding and capability, developing with decreasing need for direct supervision. Eventually students should be able to perform each activity independently, only requiring assistance in situations of unique or uncommon complexity.

The list of topics that EPAs address include:

1. History and physical exam skills
2. Differential diagnosis
3. Diagnostic/screening tests
4. Orders and prescriptions
5. Patient encounter documentation
6. Oral presentations of patient encounters
7. Clinical questioning/using evidence
8. Patient handovers/transitions of care
9. Teamwork
10. Urgent/Emergency care
11. Informed consent
12. Procedures
13. Safety and improvement

Medical education has been criticized for limited innovation and for the length of schooling, which increases cost burden on students. There has been a proliferation of programs that combine medical training with research (M.D./Ph.D.) or management programs (M.D./MBA), although this has been criticized because extended interruption to clinical study has been shown to have a detrimental effect on ultimate clinical knowledge.

=== Medical student ===
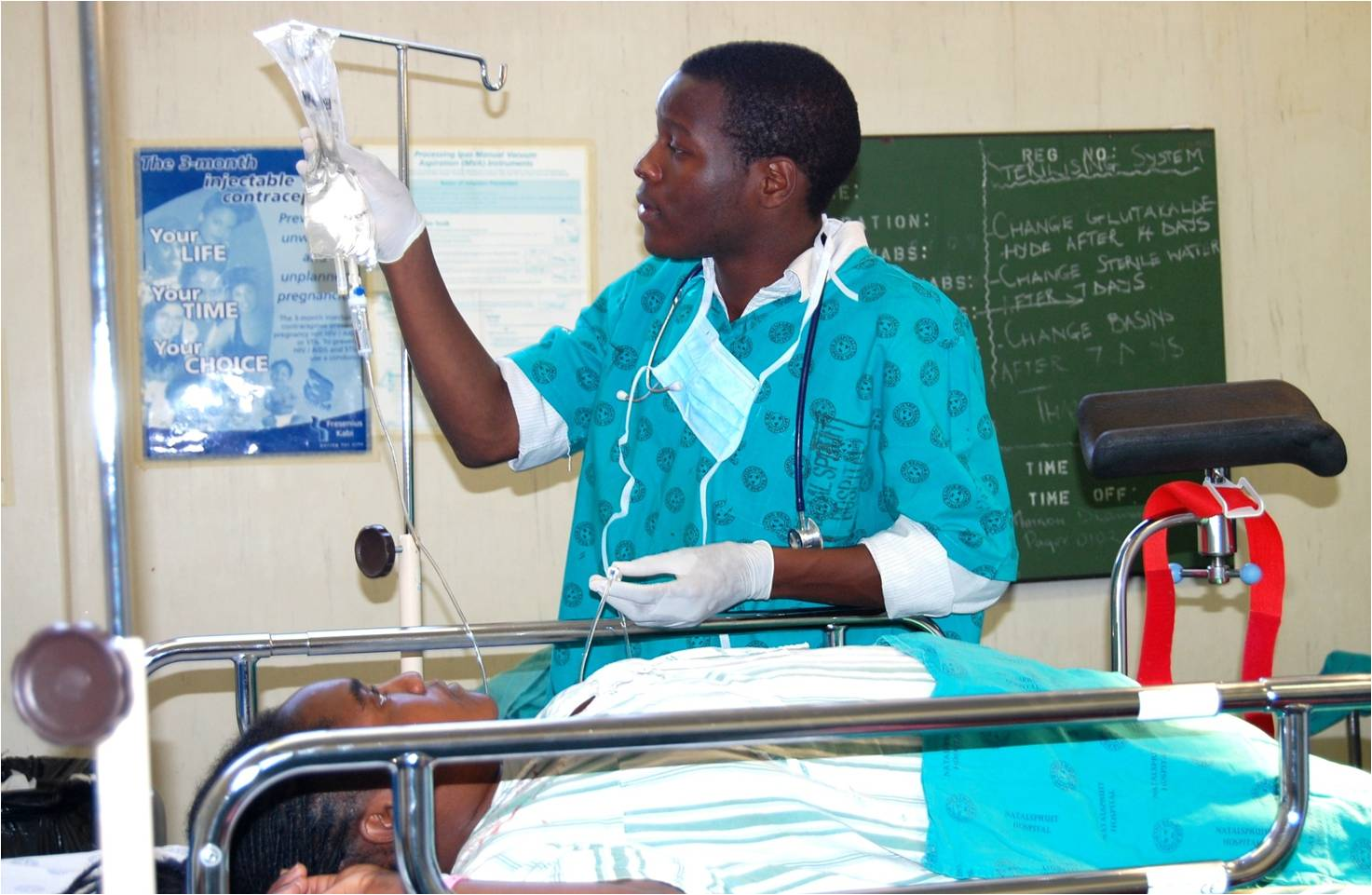
A medical student on clinical rotation administering patient care

A medical student is an individual enrolled at a medical school with the eventual goal of becoming a medical doctor. Medical students are exposed to both preclinical and clinical studies throughout their professional education, and are generally conferred a medical degree upon successful completion of the required curriculum. Further training through a residency program in addition to board certification is required in many jurisdictions prior to individuals becoming eligible to obtain a medical license and practice as a physician.

==== Challenges ====
Stress in medical students is a widely recognized problem, causing both short- and long-lasting physical and psychological effects that are detrimental to the well-being of medical students. The demands of medical school curriculum can differ significantly from academic expectations students have previously been exposed to, which can lead to uncertainty in personal study behavior and progress, in addition to concerns regarding the availability of study materials. Stress has been observed to differ across student demographics and stage of training; students have often cited academic pressure and financial burden as significant stressors. A higher prevalence of depression and anxiety has been noted among trainees in comparison to the general population, likely due to the constant exposure to clinical environments as well as high demands of medical training. Excessive levels of stress at the medical student level may serve as a precursor to physician burnout, a well-documented psychological syndrome of fatigue due to chronic exposure to occupational stressors.

In addition to acting as a stressor, the financial burden of attending medical school can be significant and may serve as a barrier for individuals seeking access to professional training. The average cost of tuition, fees and health insurance for medical schools in the United States for the 2021-2022 academic year was US$62,539 for private institutions; students reported that these high costs, in addition to further unexpected additional expenses associated with attendance, significantly impacted their mental health and well-being.

Bullying in medicine has been noted to disproportionately affect medical students. A 1990 JAMA study reported that 46.4% of students at one medical school have reported being abused at some point during their education; despite increased public awareness, Association of American Medical Colleges graduation questionnaires from 2012 and 2013 reported mistreatment rates of 47.1% and 42.1%, respectively. Medical students have also cited abuse in academic research settings, ranging from bullying and harassment to denial of recognition and authorship manipulation.

== Postgraduate education ==
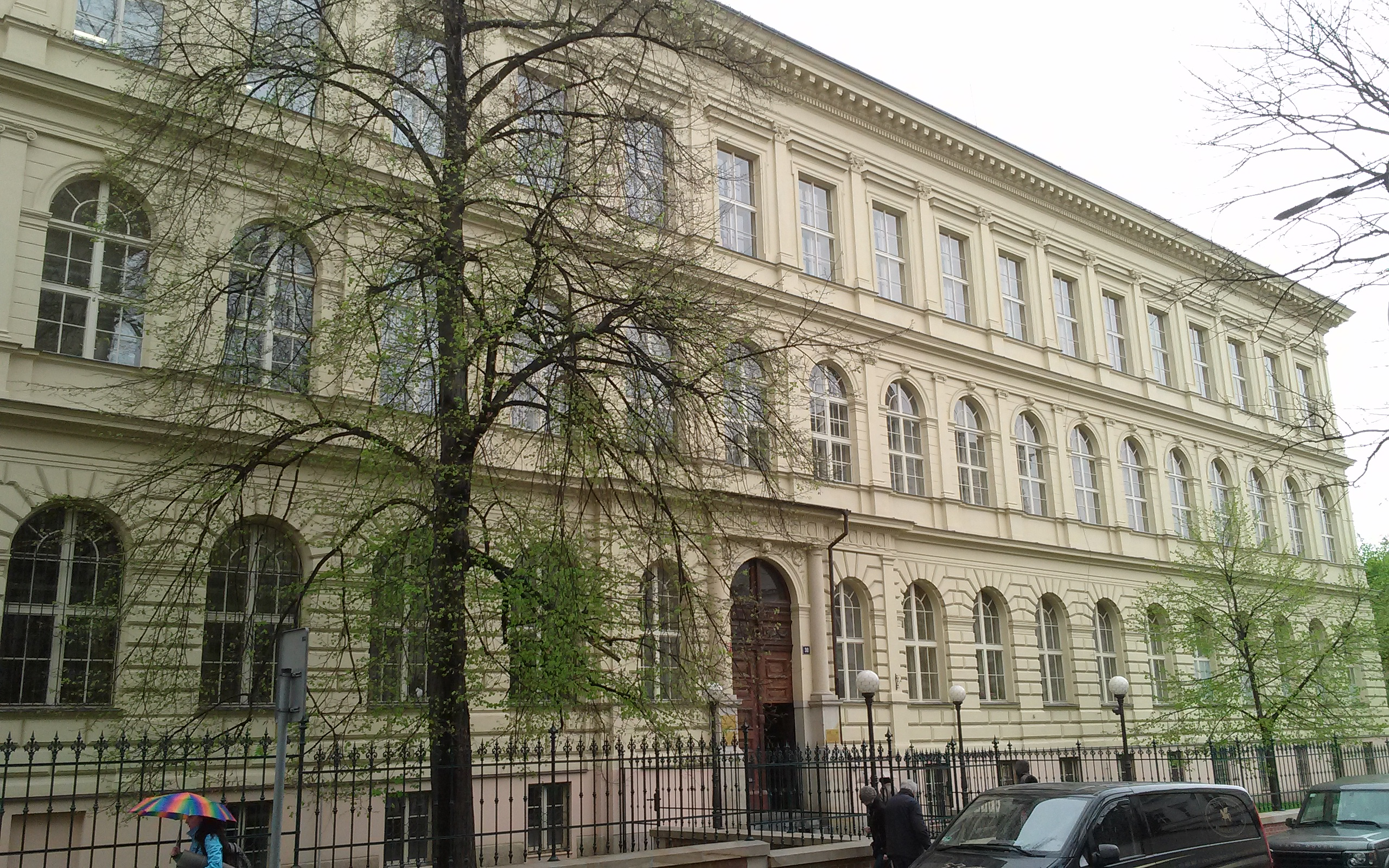
Dean's office at the First Faculty of Medicine, Charles University, Prague

Following completion of entry-level training, newly graduated doctors are often required to undertake a period of supervised practice before full registration is granted; this is most often of one-year duration and may be referred to as an "internship," "provisional registration," or "residency".

Further training in a particular field of medicine may be undertaken. In the U.S., further specialized training, completed after residency is referred to as "fellowship". In some jurisdictions, this is commenced immediately following completion of entry-level training, while other jurisdictions require junior doctors to undertake generalist (non-specialty) training for a number of years before commencing specialization.

Each residency and fellowship program is accredited by the Accreditation Council for Graduate Medical Education (ACGME), a non-profit organization led by physicians with the goal of enhancing educational standards among physicians. The ACGME oversees all M.D. and D.O. residency programs in the United States. As of 2019, there were approximately 11,700 ACGME accredited residencies and fellowship programs in 181 specialties and subspecialties.

Education theory itself is becoming an integral part of postgraduate medical training. Formal qualifications in education are also becoming the norm for medical educators, such that there has been a rapid increase in the number of available graduate programs in medical education.

== Continuing medical education ==
In most countries, continuing medical education (CME) courses are required for continued licensing. CME requirements vary by state and by country. In the US, accreditation is overseen by the Accreditation Council for Continuing Medical Education (ACCME). Physicians often attend dedicated lectures, grand rounds, conferences, and performance improvement activities in order to fulfill their requirements. Additionally, physicians are increasingly opting to pursue further graduate-level training in the formal study of medical education as a pathway for continuing professional development.

== Online learning ==
Medical education is increasingly utilizing online teaching, usually within learning management systems (LMSs) or virtual learning environments (VLEs). Additionally, several medical schools have incorporated the use of blended learning combining the use of video, asynchronous, and in-person exercises. A landmark scoping review published in 2018 demonstrated that online teaching modalities are becoming increasingly prevalent in medical education, with associated high student satisfaction and improvement on knowledge tests. However, the use of evidence-based multimedia design principles in the development of online lectures was seldom reported, despite their known effectiveness in medical student contexts. To enhance variety in an online delivery environment, the use of serious games, which have previously shown benefit in medical education, can be incorporated to break the monotony of online-delivered lectures.

Research areas into online medical education include practical applications, including simulated patients and virtual medical records (see also: telehealth). When compared to no intervention, simulation in medical education training is associated with positive effects on knowledge, skills, and behaviors and moderate effects for patient outcomes. However, data is inconsistent on the effectiveness of asynchronous online learning when compared to traditional in-person lectures. Furthermore, studies utilizing modern visualization technology (i.e. virtual and augmented reality) have shown great promise as means to supplement lesson content in physiological and anatomical education.

=== Telemedicine/telehealth education ===
With the advent of telemedicine (aka telehealth), students learn to interact with and treat patients online, an increasingly important skill in medical education. In training, students and clinicians enter a "virtual patient room" in which they interact and share information with a simulated or real patient actors. Students are assessed based on professionalism, communication, medical history gathering, physical exam, and ability to make shared decisions with the patient actor.

== Medical education systems by country ==
=== North America ===
==== Canada ====
In Canada, a medical school is a faculty or school of a university that trains future medical doctors and usually offers a three- to five-year Doctor of Medicine (M.D.) or Doctor of Medicine and Master of Surgery (M.D., C.M.) degree. There are currently 18 medical schools in Canada with an annual admission success rate normally below 7.5%. As of 2021, approximately 11,500 students were enrolled in Canadian medical schools graduating 2,900 students per year.

Faculties of medicine at the University of Calgary, the Dalhousie University, the University of Manitoba, the McMaster University, the University of Toronto, and the University of Saskatchewan also offer a post-entry professional two-year bachelor or master's degree to train physician assistants.

==== Panama ====
Medical education in Panama is principally offered and developed by accredited and government recognized medical schools in the country. There are 5 medical schools in Panama, typically offering the Bachelor of Medicine and Surgery degrees. In Panama medical programs are divided into two types: undergraduate entry and graduate entry.

==== United States ====
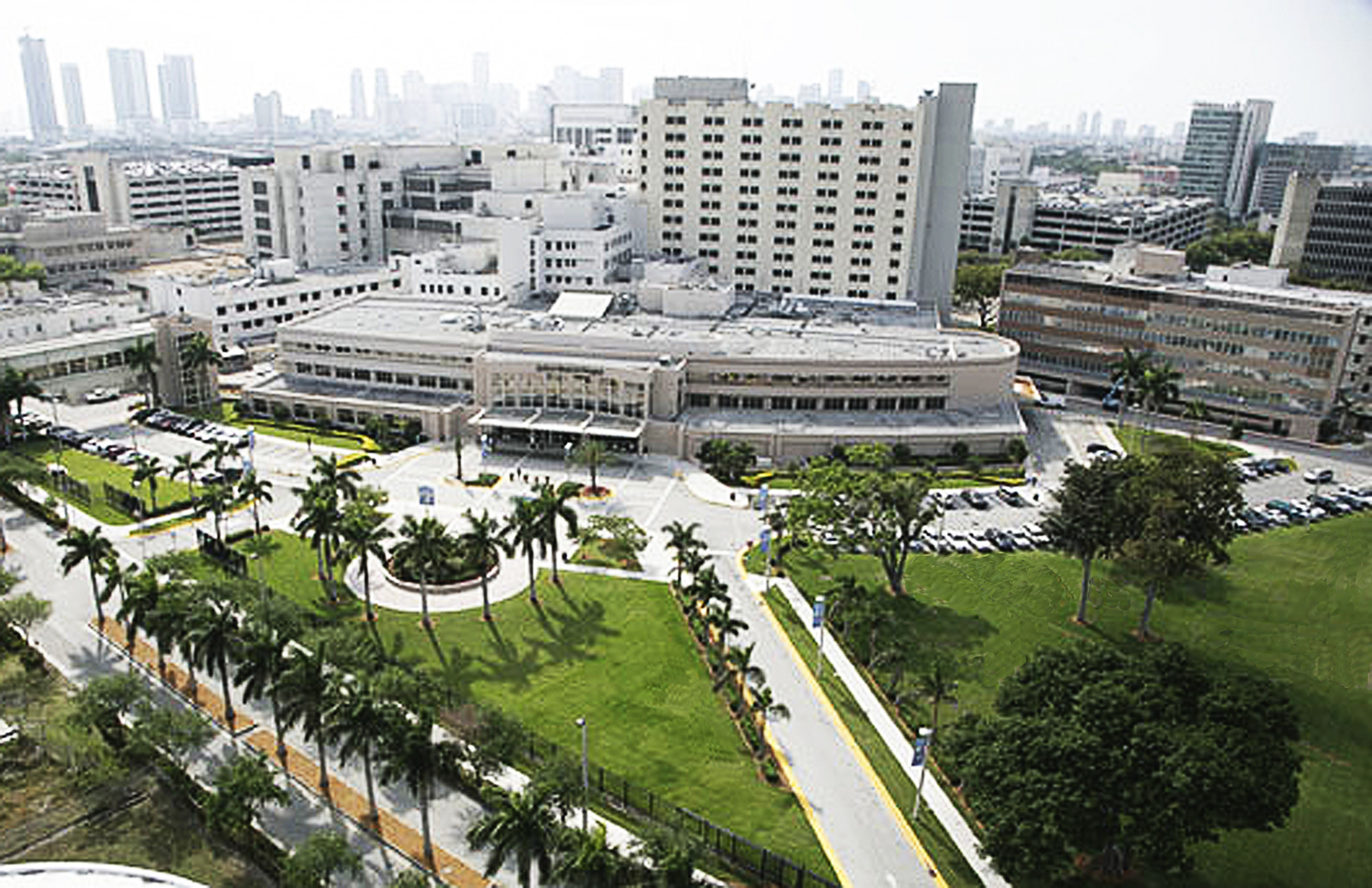
Jackson Memorial Hospital in Miami, the primary teaching hospital for the Miller School of Medicine at the University of Miami, in July 2010

In the U.S., a prospective medical student must first complete an undergraduate degree in any subject before applying to a graduate medical school to pursue a medical program. U.S. medical schools are almost all four-year programs. Some students opt for the research-focused M.D./Ph.D. dual degree program, which is usually completed in 7–10 years.

Students are generally required to have completed a pre-medical educational track at the undergraduate level prior to applying. There are no formal academic major requirements, but relevant courses may involve chemistry, physics and biology subjects; most schools maintain a list of academic prerequisites. These concepts, alongside others, are present on the Medical College Admission Test (MCAT), a standardized test taken by prospective students during the application process. Although research has demonstrated that MCAT scores can be predictive of performance throughout medical education, concerns regarding adequate access to educational resources for test preparation by students of lower socioeconomic status have been raised.

Traditionally, medical schools follow a four-year curriculum, with the first two years covering basic science education, while the final two years comprise clinical clerkship training, where students receive firsthand experience in and training for patient care. Students are expected to gain a complete understanding human physiological processes, appreciate the pathology of common medical conditions, and gain a deep understanding of medical ethics throughout their education. Medical education has shifted toward becoming more interdisciplinary in recent years, with students also expected to understand how social studies may affect patient health and play into the evolving healthcare landscape in the United States.

Medical schools in the United States grant either Doctor of Medicine (MD) or Doctor of Osteopathic Medicine (DO) degrees, both of which entitle the holder to receive medical licensing at an accredited residency training program. Students are expected to prepare for and take either the United States Medical Licensing Examination (USMLE) or Comprehensive Osteopathic Medical Licensing Examination of the United States (COMLEX-USA), both of which are divided into three components. Successful completion of these examinations is required prior to the issuance of a medical license in the United States.

=== Europe ===
==== France ====
Medical education in France is administered by departments within universities called Unités de formation et de recherche de médecine (UFR) (Medical Training and Research Units). The training takes a minimum of ten years after the baccalauréat and concludes with a clinical thesis defence. Upon the successful presentation of their thesis, the medical student is awarded a diplôme d'études spécialisées (DES), based on their specialty. Certain high-achievers are awarded a diplôme d'études spécialisées complémentaire (DESC).

French medical training is one of the longest schooling paths in French higher education. It consists of both theoretical and practical training, starting from being more theoretical, moving to more practical aspects as training progresses.

==== Norway ====
Medical education in Norway to become a professional physician is offered by the four major universities in Norway: the Norwegian University of Science and Technology, University of Bergen, University of Oslo, and University of Tromsø. The education takes 6 years and leads to a cand.med.-degree which is equivalent to Doctor of Medicine. The programme includes extensive clinical service that covers a wide range of patients, from primary health care in Norwegian municipalities to centralised specialist hospital departments, and from emergency medicine to caring for chronically ill patients.

Traditionally cand.med.-graduates would have to complete a 1.5 year internship to be granted legal authorization for practising medicine, but because Norway is part of the EFTA, all physicians that can practice medicine in any part of EU/EFTA must also be able to practice medicine in Norway. This has led the health authorities in Norway to give authorization upon graduating, so that Norwegian graduates would have the same rights as foreign graduates. Now the internship programme is a part of the specialist-education.

==== United Kingdom ====
In the United Kingdom, a typical medicine course at university is five years, or four years if the student already holds a degree. Among some institutions and for some students, it may be six years (including the selection of an intercalated BSc—taking one year—at some point after the pre-clinical studies). All programs culminate in the Bachelor of Medicine and Surgery degree (abbreviated MBChB, MBBS, MBBCh, BM, etc.). This is followed by two clinical foundation years afterward, namely F1 and F2, similar to internship training. Students register with the UK General Medical Council at the end of F1. At the end of F2, they may pursue further years of study. The system in Australia is very similar, with registration by the Australian Medical Council (AMC).

=== Asia/Middle East/Oceania ===
==== Australia ====
In Australia, there are two pathways to a medical degree. Students can choose to take a five- or six-year undergraduate medical degree Bachelor of Medicine/Bachelor of Surgery (MBBS or BMed) as a first tertiary degree directly after secondary school graduation, or first complete a bachelor's degree (in general three years, usually in the medical sciences) and then apply for a four-year graduate entry Bachelor of Medicine/Bachelor of Surgery (MBBS) program.

==== China ====
In 1956, in the midst of China's education reform modeling Soviet practices, the Ministry of Hygiene embarked on standardizing medical education and organizing medical colleges in China. Taking an April, 1955 Soviet curriculum as reference, the resulting curriculum would offer a tertiary higher medical education at a maximum of 12 years. By 1958, traditional Chinese medicine was included in the curriculum. Beginning in 1962, a six-year course for medical education and a five-year course in pharmacology came into effect. Despite these early standardizations, the Cultural Revolution saw a halt in higher medical education and a preference for "barefoot doctors" with little to none formal medical education. Higher medical education was revived in 1977 on orders of the Ministry of Education and the State Department to resume higher education; starting February, 1978, students are enrolled in a five-year course for medical school and a four-year course for pharmacology at the undergraduate level.

In 2012, the Chinese Ministry of Education proposed again to standardize medical education in China into "5+3" programs: five years of undergraduate medical school training and three years of residency. Meanwhile, the same proposal also suggested a "3+2" program for graduates of higher vocational colleges: a three-year vocational medical degree and two years residency. The indetermination of this departmental opinion displayed how various tracks of higher medical education coexist in contemporary China. Previously, a 1998 State Department regulation established professional clinical medicine degrees of Master of Medicine (M.M) and Doctor of Medicine (M.D). Applicants to these degrees require three years of experience as resident physicians as well as supervised training of at least six months; a M.M holder may advance to M.D with three years of further residency, bring the potential length of the most advanced medical degree in China to 11 years. Neither of these regulations, though theoretically still in effect, reflect the full reality of undergraduate and postgraduate degree programs in the early decades of the 21st century. By 2019, Chinese medical education features tracks of three-year (vocational or no degree), five-year (Bachelor of Medicine), "5+3" (Master's degree in Medicine or in Clinical Medicine), eight-year (MD), etc. Postgraduate degrees are further categorized into research degrees and professional degrees.

The National Health Commission of the People's Republic of China certifies practitioner qualification through annual qualification examinations managed by its subsidiary National Medical Examination Center (NMEC). The 2021 Law on Doctors of the People's Republic of China (《中华人民共和国医师法》) rules that physicians satisfying the following criteria may enter qualification exams, catering to three types of practitioners, those with a bachelor's degree or above, with a junior-college or vocational degree, and those engaged in Traditional Chinese and ethnic Medicine practices:

has obtained a bachelor's degree or above in a medicine-related major from an institution of higher education and has completed at least one year of medical work practice at a medical and healthcare institution under the guidance of a practicing doctor.(Article 9, subsection 1)

has obtained a junior college degree in a medicine-related major from an institution of higher education, and has practiced with a medical and healthcare institution for at least two years after obtaining a practicing certificate of practicing assistant doctors.(Article 9, subsection 2)

has obtained a junior college degree or above in a medicine-related major from an institution of higher education and has completed at least one year of medical work practice at a medical and healthcare institution under the guidance of a practicing doctor may take the examination of practicing assistant doctors' qualifications. (Article 10)

Notably, Article 11 specifies how Traditional Chinese Medicine practitioners may obtain qualification: "has studied TCM for at least three years through master-disciple education or who has acquired special medical skill after many years of practice may, after passing the assessment of and being recommended by a professional TCM organization or a medical and healthcare institution authorized by the health department of the people's government at or above the county level, take the examination of TCM doctors' qualifications."

==== Hong Kong ====
Modern medical education in Hong Kong started in 1887 with the founding of the Hong Kong College of Medicine for Chinese. Currently, two universities provide MBBS degree for doctors and six universities provide undergraduate degrees in other subjects of health sciences.

==== India ====
In India, a medical college is an educational institution that provides medical education. These institutions may vary from stand-alone colleges that train doctors to conglomerates that offer training related in all aspects of medical care. The term is synonymous with "medical school" as used in the US and some other countries. MBBS is a degree in medicine established by Indian Medical Council Act 1956 and continued in National Medical Commission Act 2019. After MBBS, doctors register with state medical councils.

==== Jordan ====
The Doctor in Medicine (MD) degree is awarded in Jordan after completion of six years comprising three years of medical sciences and three clinical years. Currently, six state supported universities include a medical school and grant the degree, which are:

- University of Jordan in Amman
- Jordan University of Science and Technology in Irbid
- Mutah University in Al Karak
- Hashemite University in Zarqa
- Yarmouk University in Irbid
- Al-Balqaʼ Applied University in Salt

Jordan's undergraduate medical education started in the 1970s with the establishment of the first medical school in the University of Jordan. Their medical education system is well regarded in the region, thus attracting foreign students especially from around the Middle East (more than a third of all students). The sole admission criterion is a satisfactory mark in the high school national exam. Students with the highest mark gain admission through the general competition system (≈6% of applicants and ≈50% of all admissions). They are rewarded with partially subsidized inexpensive tuition fees. The rest of the admitted students are either foreigners or students that achieved high school marks of 85% or greater. The curricula is divided into an initial 3-year pre-clinical stage followed by 3 clinical years for a total of 6 years of education. The pre-clinical curriculum includes basic sciences, medical sciences and university required courses. In turn, the clinical curriculum includes clerkship rotations lasting from 2 to 12 weeks. At the end of the sixth year, students undergo a written theoretical assessment as well as a supervised clinical assessment. Passing students are awarded a Bachelor's in Medicine and Surgery

==== The Philippines ====
Medical education in Philippines is principally offered and developed by accredited and government recognized medical schools in the country.

Medical schools in the Philippines are professional schools offering the Doctor of Medicine (M.D.) degree. The M.D. is a four-year and six months professional degree program which qualifies the degree holder to take the licensure exam for medical doctors in the Philippines.

Health professionals are one of the biggest exports of the Philippines and a significant source of tax revenue for the government which subsidises medical education.

==== South Korea ====
Medical education in South Korea includes educational activities involved in the education and training of medical doctors in the country, from entry-level training through to continuing education of qualified specialists.

=== Africa ===
==== South Africa ====
There are eleven medical schools in South Africa, each under the auspices of a public university. As the country is a former British colony, most institutions follow the British-based undergraduate method of instruction, admitting students directly from high school into 6 or 5-year programs. Some universities such as the University of the Witwatersrand in Johannesburg have started offering post-graduate medical degrees that run concurrently with their undergraduate programs. In this instance, a student having completed an appropriate undergraduate degree with basic sciences can enter into a four-year postgraduate program.

South African medical schools award the MB ChB degree, except the University of the Witwatersrand, which styles its degree MB BCh. Some universities allow students to earn an intercalated degree, completing a BSc (Medical) with an additional year of study after the second or third year of the MBChB. The University of Cape Town, in particular, has spearheaded a recent effort to increase the level of medical research training and exposure of medical students through an Intercalated Honours Programme, with the option to extend this to a PhD.

Following successful completion of study, all South African medical graduates must complete a two-year internship as well as a further year of community service in order to register with the Health Professions Council and practice as a doctor in the country.

Specialisation is usually a five- to seven-year training process (depending on the specialty) requiring registering as a medical registrar attached to an academic clinical department in a large teaching hospital with appropriate examinations. The specialist qualification may be conferred as a Fellowship by the independent Colleges of Medicine of South Africa (CMSA), following British tradition, or as a Magisterial degree by the university (usually the M Med, Master of Medicine, degree). The Medical schools and the CMSA also offer Higher Diplomas in many fields. Research degrees are the MMed and PhD or MD, depending on the university.

Medical students from all over the world come to South Africa to gain practical experience in the country's many teaching hospitals and rural clinics. The language of instruction is English but a few indigenous languages are studied briefly. The University of the Free State has a parallel medium policy, meaning all English classes are also presented in Afrikaans, therefore students who choose to study in Afrikaans, do so separately from the English class.

==== Uganda ====
As of 2021, 11 universities in Uganda offer medical schools. Admission to medical school requires the candidate to have attained a Uganda Advanced Certificate of Education (UACE) as well as proficiency in Biology or Zoology, Chemistry and Physics at A-level standards. Training leading to the degree of Bachelor of Medicine and Bachelor of Surgery (MBChB) lasts five years. Major examinations are conducted after the first, second and fifth year, with additional evaluations after each clinical rotation. After successful completion of the fifth year, candidates complete a year of internship under the supervision of specialists. Postgraduate training is available at Makerere University School of Medicine and other Public and Private Universities in a number of medical and surgical disciplines. The training takes three to four years and leads to the Master of Medicine (MMed) degree. The East, Central and Southern Africa College of Health Sciences (ECSA CHS) is nowadays another alternative postgraduate training pathway in Uganda, such as Membership [MCS (ECSA)] and Fellowship [FCS (ECSA)] of the College of Surgeons of East, Central and Southern Africa (COSECSA); as well as in Internal Medicine through the East, Central and Southern Africa College of Physicians (ECSACOP) and the College of Obstetrics and Gynecology of East, Central and Southern Africa (ECSACOG) for Obstetricians and Gynecologists.

== Norms and values ==
The aims of medical ethics training are to give medical doctors the ability to recognize ethical issues, reason about them morally and legally when making clinical decisions, and be able to interact to obtain the information necessary to do so.

Along with training individuals in the practice of medicine, medical education influences the norms and values of its participants (patients, families, etc.) This either occurs through explicit training in medical ethics, or covertly through a hidden curriculum –– a body of norms and values that students encounter implicitly, but is not formally taught. While formal ethics courses are a requirement at schools such as those accredited by the LCME, gaps between these courses and the hidden curriculum throughout medical education are frequently raised as issues contributing to the culture of medicine.The hidden curriculum may include the use of unprofessional behaviors for efficiency (Note: "As in any crisis, the environment has evolved to accept substandard professional behavior in exchange for efficiency or productivity") or viewing the academic hierarchy as more important than the patient. (Note: "In Coulehan's view, the hidden curriculum places the academic hierarchy—not the patient—at the center of medical education.") In certain institutions, such as those with LCME accreditation, the requirement of professionalism may be additionally weaponized against trainees, with complaints about ethics and safety being labelled as unprofessional. The hidden curriculum was recently shown to be a cause of reduction in medical student empathy as they progress throughout medical school.

The politicization of medicine and health advocacy has been criticized.

== Integration with health policy ==
As medical professional stakeholders in the field of health care (i.e. entities integrally involved in the health care system and affected by reform), the practice of medicine (i.e. diagnosing, treating, and monitoring disease) is directly affected by the ongoing changes in both national and local health policy and economics.

There is a growing call for health professional training programs to not only adopt more rigorous health policy education and leadership training, but to apply a broader lens to the concept of teaching and implementing health policy through health equity and social disparities that largely affect health and patient outcomes. Increased mortality and morbidity rates occur from birth to age 75, attributed to medical care (insurance access, quality of care), individual behavior (smoking, diet, exercise, drugs, risky behavior), socioeconomic and demographic factors (poverty, inequality, racial disparities, segregation), and physical environment (housing, education, transportation, urban planning). A country's health care delivery system reflects its "underlying values, tolerances, expectations, and cultures of the societies they serve", and medical professionals stand in a unique position to influence opinion and policy of patients, healthcare administrators, & lawmakers.

In order to truly integrate health policy matters into physician and medical education, training should begin as early as possible – ideally during medical school or premedical coursework – to build "foundational knowledge and analytical skills" continued during residency and reinforced throughout clinical practice, like any other core skill or competency. This source further recommends adopting a national standardized core health policy curriculum for medical schools and residencies in order to introduce a core foundation in this much needed area, focusing on four main domains of health care: (1) systems and principles (e.g. financing; payment; models of management; information technology; physician workforce), (2) quality and safety (e.g. quality improvement indicators, measures, and outcomes; patient safety), (3) value and equity (e.g. medical economics, medical decision making, comparative effectiveness, health disparities), and (4) politics and law (e.g. history and consequences of major legislation; adverse events, medical errors, and malpractice).

However limitations to implementing these health policy courses mainly include perceived time constraints from scheduling conflicts, the need for an interdisciplinary faculty team, and lack of research / funding to determine what curriculum design may best suit the program goals. Resistance in one pilot program was seen from program directors who did not see the relevance of the elective course and who were bounded by program training requirements limited by scheduling conflicts and inadequate time for non-clinical activities. But for students in one medical school study, those taught higher-intensity curriculum (vs lower-intensity) were "three to four times as likely to perceive themselves as appropriately trained in components of health care systems", and felt it did not take away from getting poorer training in other areas. Additionally, recruiting and retaining a diverse set of multidisciplinary instructors and policy or economic experts with sufficient knowledge and training may be limited at community-based programs or schools without health policy or public health departments or graduate programs. Remedies may include having online courses, off-site trips to the capitol or health foundations, or dedicated externships, but these have interactive, cost, and time constraints as well. Despite these limitations, several programs in both medical school and residency training have been pioneered.

Lastly, more national support and research will be needed to not only establish these programs but to evaluate how to both standardize and innovate the curriculum in a way that is flexible with the changing health care and policy landscape. In the United States, this will involve coordination with the ACGME (Accreditation Council for Graduate Medical Education), a private non-profit organization (NPO) that sets educational and training standards for U.S. residencies and fellowships that determines funding and ability to operate.

=== Medical education as a subject-didactic field ===
Medical education is also the subject-didactic field of educating medical doctors at all levels, applying theories of pedagogy in the medical context, with its own journals, such as Medical Education. Researchers and practitioners in this field are usually medical doctors or educationalists. Medical curricula vary between medical schools, and are constantly evolving in response to the need of medical students, as well as the resources available. Medical schools have been documented to utilize various forms of problem-based learning, team-based learning, and simulation. The Liaison Committee on Medical Education (LCME) publishes standard guidelines regarding goals of medical education, including curriculum design, implementation, and evaluation.

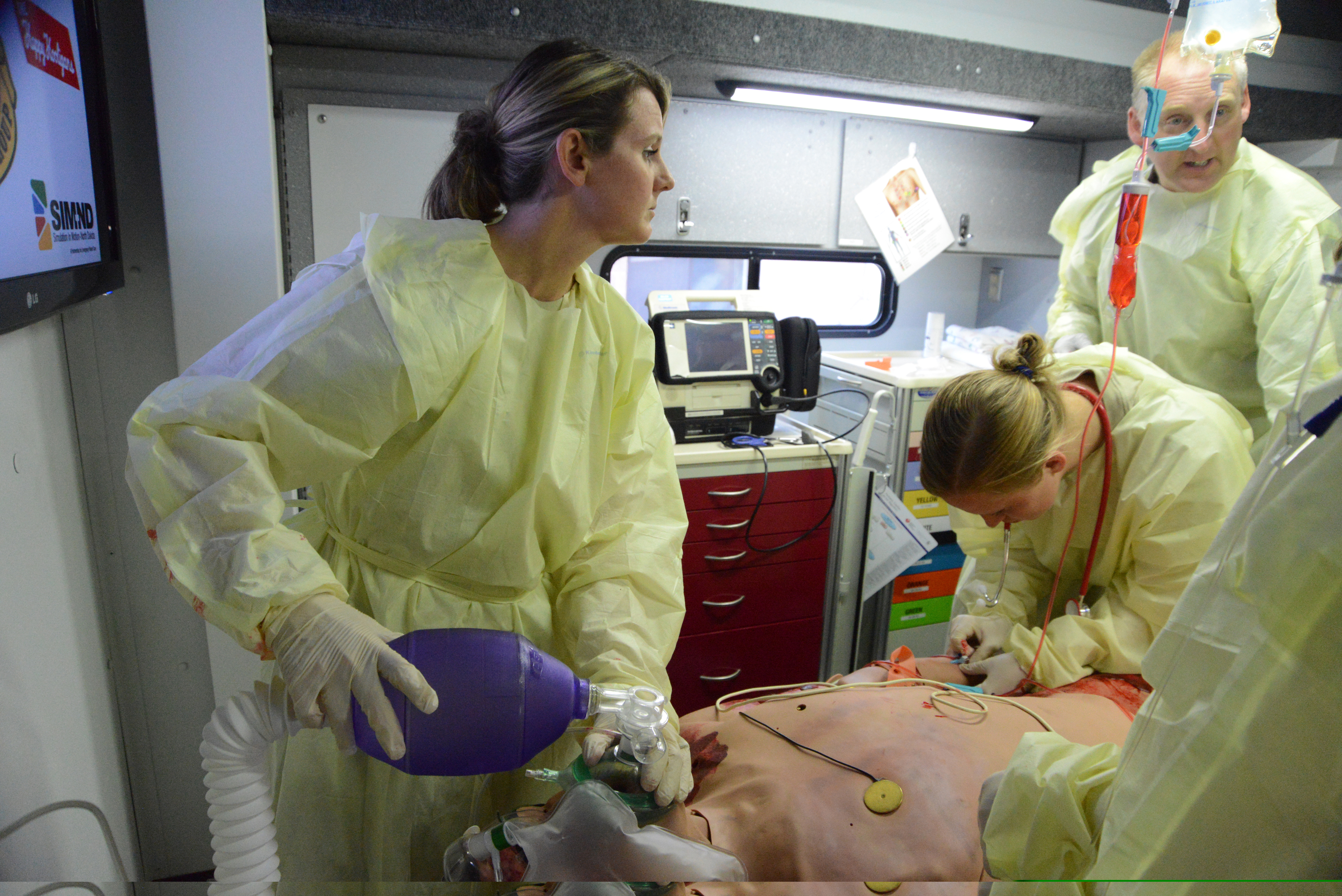
Air National Guard Base training in medical simulation

The objective structured clinical examinations (OSCEs) are widely utilized as a way to assess health science students' clinical abilities in a controlled setting. Although used in medical education programs throughout the world, the methodology for assessment may vary between programs and thus attempts to standardize the assessment have been made.

=== Cadaver laboratory ===
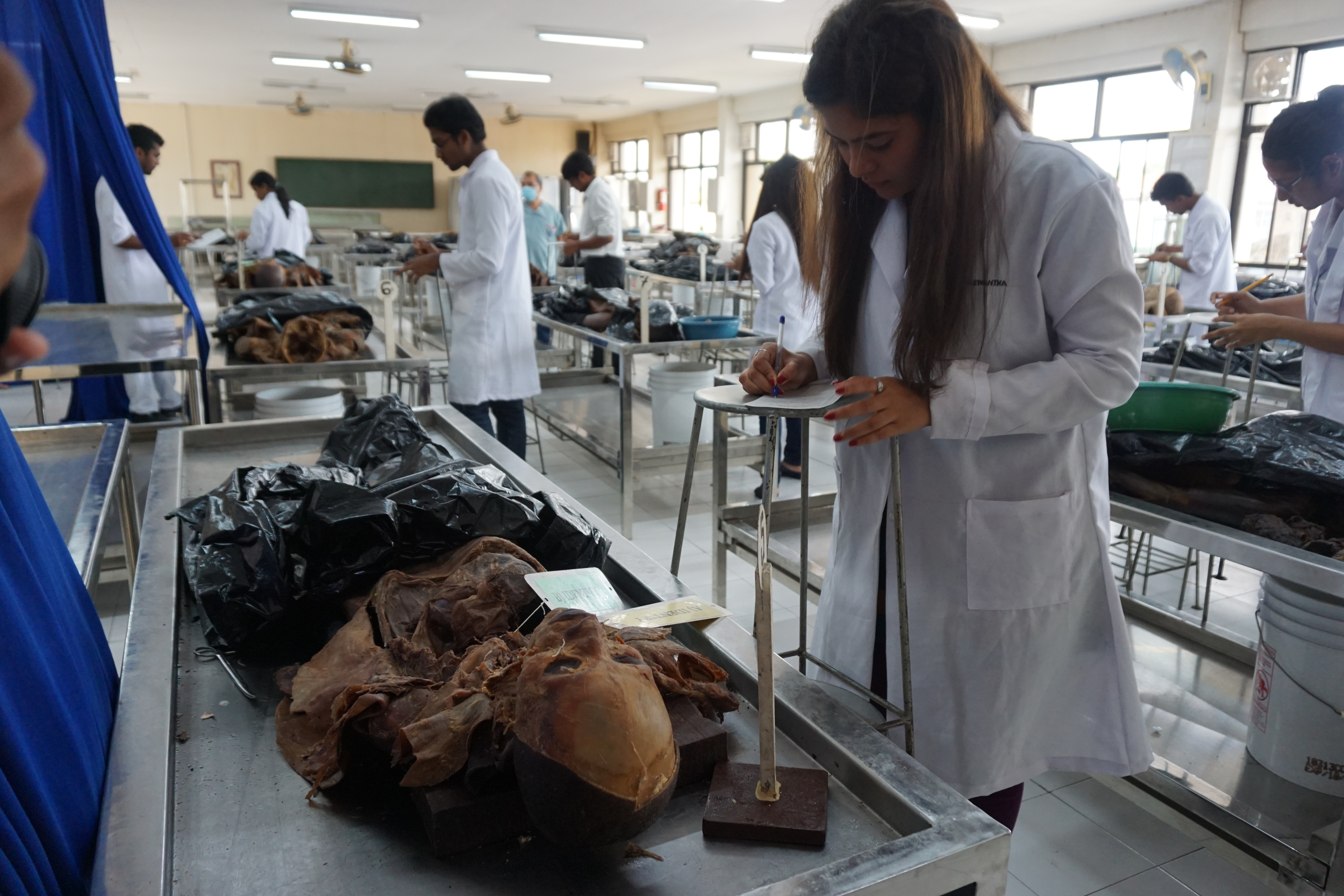
Medical student describes anatomical landmarks of a donated human cadaver.

Medical schools and surgical residency programs may utilize cadavers to identify anatomy, study pathology, perform procedures, correlate radiology findings, and identify causes of death. With the integration of technology, traditional cadaver dissection has been debated regarding its effectiveness in medical education, but remains a large component of medical curriculum around the world. Didactic courses in cadaver dissection are commonly offered by certified anatomists, scientists, and physicians with a background in the subject.

=== Medical curriculum and evidence-based medical education journals ===
Medical curriculum vary widely among medical schools and residency programs, but generally follow an evidence based medical education (EBME) approach. These evidence based approaches are published in medical journals. The list of peer-reviewed medical education journals includes, but is not limited to:

- Academic Medicine
- Medical Education
- Advances in Health Science Education
- Medical Teacher

Open access medical education journals:

- Perspectives on Medical Education
- BMC Medical Education
- MedEDPORTAL
- Journal of Medical Education and Curricular Development
- MedConnect
- MediUnite and MediUnite Journal

Graduate Medical Education and Continuing Medical Education focused journals:

- Journal of Continuing Education in the Health Professions
- Journal of Graduate Medical Education

This is not a complete list of medical education journals. Each medical journal in this list has a varying impact factor (mean number of citations) indicating how often it is used in scientific research and study.

== See also ==
- Doctors to Be (an occasional series on BBC television)
- INMED
- List of medical schools
- List of medical education agencies
- My Medical Education
- Objective Structured Clinical Examination
- Perspectives on Medical Education, a journal
- Progress testing
- Validation of foreign studies and degrees
- Virtual patient
- Calgary–Cambridge model
