= My Medical Education =

Medical education search engine

- Website type: Web search engine
- Available in: German, English
- Owner: WEFRA LIFE GROUP
- Registration: Optional
- Users: 11,000

My Medical Education is a search engine for continuing medical education and an interactive community for doctors, medical staff such as nurses, medical consultants, speakers, hosts, organisers and sponsors, e.g., the pharmaceutical industry. With 11,000 registered members My Medical Education is the largest database and source for information for those interested in continuing medical education worldwide.

== History ==
The German advertising and consulting agency Wefra life group has been publishing the print compendium Medizinische Kongresse for continuing medical education since 1986. This reference guide covers 4,000 national and international medical events.

In 2002, the online search engine was launched. Under www.medical-congresses.com medical events could be searched for and found, selectable by various criteria such as specific topics, venue, date and host, worldwide.

Following a relaunch in 2009, registered users were from then on able to create profiles, set up an own event calendar as well as rate events and speakers on the new platform www.my-medical-education.com - the successor of www.medical-congresses.com.

== Launch ==
On October 21, 2010, www.my-medical-education.com was officially launched with numerous new features, functions and services. Developed into an interactive professional community, www.my-medical-education.com now offers everything around continuing medical education together with the core elements: the intelligent event search engine and the event database. Interactive features and modules for networking and communicating with other users are new: participants can exchange opinions on events and speakers, rate and recommend them and save dates in their profile. Market research tools, virtual education and events, iPhone-apps and e-learning programmes will complete the range of functions and services (Medical Tribune 2010).
