= Alliance of Independent Academic Medical Centers =

- Established: 1989
- Type: Medical education professional association
- Key people: Joe Jaeger, President; Kimberly Pierce-Boggs, Executive Director
- Website: www.aiamc.org

The Alliance of Independent Academic Medical Centers (AIAMC) is an American national membership organization of approximately 70 major academic medical centers and health systems concerned with patient care, medical education and research. AIAMC members regard medical education and research as strategic assets in providing patient-centered care; operate independently of medical school ownership or governance while maintaining major medical school affiliations; care for a patient population that mirrors their local communities; and provide teaching and research that is innovative, applicable to practice and community responsive.

== History ==
The AIAMC was formed in 1989 to provide a forum for those institutions whose governance and academic leadership were distinct from that of their associated medical schools. Today, it is considered a national resource, with Alliance members participating in leadership and governance roles in key groups as the AAMC, ACCME, ACGME, AHA, AMA and others.

== National Initiative to Improve Patient Care through Graduate Medical Education ==
=== National Initiative I ===
In early 2007, the Alliance of Independent Academic Medical Centers (AIAMC) launched Improving Patient Care through Graduate Medical Education: A National Initiative of Independent Academic Medical Centers. Nineteen AIAMC-member institutions participated in this charter effort. The National Initiative (NI) featured five meetings over the course of 18 months which served as touchstones for ongoing quality improvement in AIAMC participating organizations. These meetings, as well as the monthly collaborative calls held in-between, provided structure, discussion and networking opportunities around specific quality improvement initiatives. This 18-month "NI-I" was supported by a grant from the foundation of HealthPartners Institute for Medical Education, an AIAMC member institution located in Minneapolis, Minnesota. The effort was led by Carl Patow, MD, Executive Director of HealthPartners Institute for Medical Education.

As a result of these efforts, AIAMC has initial findings that demonstrate the efficacy of integrating GME into patient safety and quality improvement initiatives. These findings have been organized into a series of articles that were published in the December 2009 issue of Academic Medicine.

=== National Initiative II ===
In 2009, AIAMC launched the second National Initiative and expanded participation to 35 AIAMC-member teaching hospitals from Seattle to Maine. Each participating hospital developed a quality improvement team led by a resident or faculty member, and included their respective quality improvement leader. These teams met four times and participated in monthly conference calls over an 18-month period. Quality improvement projects focused on the following areas: Communication, Hand Offs, Infection Control, Readmissions and Transitions of Care. The objectives of this second phase were:

- to align and integrate academic programs with quality initiatives to accelerate the efforts of quality and patient safety;
- assist residency program directors and house staff in the teaching, learning and assessment of the core competencies focused on Practice-Based Learning and Systems Based Practice;
- inform hospital and policy leaders about the contributions that can be made by faculty and house staff in expediting patient safety; and
- integrate house staff into multidisciplinary team-based safety initiatives as a national priority.

=== National Initiative III ===
National Initiative III launched in the fall of 2011, and will directly address the ACGME Common Program Requirements for Professionalism, Personal Responsibility and Patient Safety by educating program directors, faculty members and residents in a train-the-trainer approach. The structure and content of NI III will also meet directives for Teamwork by providing training in effective communication as part of inter-professional teams. The structure of the National Initiative III will resemble the previous two initiatives, with quarterly meetings for quality improvement didactics and leadership training, conference calls to assess progress, and local hospital team initiatives to improve patient care.

=== National Initiative IV ===
The fourth National Initiative recognized the importance of the Accreditation Council for Graduate Medical Education initiative entitled the "Clinical Learning Environment Review". Teams from over 35 teaching hospitals across the United States participated in a two-year learning collaborative to improve performance in six focus areas: patient safety, quality improvement, transitions of care, supervision, fatigue management and professionalism.

=== National Initiative V ===
National Initiative V began in 2015, and focused on the role of teaching hospitals' response to health care disparities. Findings from the National Initiatives are published in the Oschner Journal.
