= Clinical Robotic Surgery Association =

US not-for-profit association

The Clinical Robotic Surgery Association is a not-for-profit educational association formed in 2009 to improve the scientific knowledge of robotic surgery as applied to the field of general surgery. The inaugural Worldwide Scientific Meeting was hosted by the University of Illinois at Chicago.

== Membership ==
Membership is open to medical students, physicians and allied health professionals with an interest in robotic surgery.

In 2010, the membership consisted of surgeons from 23 countries, representing early-adopters of robotic surgery in each country. The association has six regional chapters in Brazil, Germany, China, Italy, Francophone Countries, and South Korea.

The founding membership includes leading practitioners in robotic general surgery. The first president of the association was Pier Cristoforo Giulianotti.

== Major Activities of the Association ==
- Sponsors a variety of continuing medical education events, including the annual Scientific Congress
- Facilitates a network of practitioners of robotic general surgery across the globe
- Fosters the development of robotic surgery in home nations through support and development of international chapters
- Encourages the development of training standards and protocols in robotic surgery across institutions by enabling a forum for open discussion
- Encourages the development of educational protocols for the inclusion of robotic surgery training in general surgery resident programs
- Creates a knowledge database of surgical videos and presentations related to robotic general surgery
