= Calgary–Cambridge model =

Method of medical interview

The Calgary–Cambridge model (Calgary-Cambridge guide) is a method for structuring medical interviews. It focuses on giving a clear structure of initiating a session, gathering information, physical examination, explaining results and planning, and closing a session. It is popular in medical education in many countries.

== Method ==
The Calgary–Cambridge model involves:

- initiating a session: This involves preparation by the clinician, building rapport with the patient, and an understanding of why the interview is needed.
- gathering information: This may be split into a focus on a biomedical perspective, the patient's experience, and contextual information about the patient. Contextual information may include personal history, social history, and other medical history.
- a physical examination of a patient: This varies based on the purpose of the interview.
- explaining results and planning: This aims to ensure a shared understanding, and allowing for shared decision-making.
- closing a session: This may involve discussing further plans.

This is designed to give a clear structure to the interview, and to help to build the relationship between the clinician and the patient. The importance of nonverbal communication is noted.

The model is based on 71 skills and techniques that improve patient interviews. These include maintaining eye contact, active listening (not interrupting, giving verbal cues), summarizing information frequently, asking about patient ideas and beliefs, and showing empathy.

== Advantages ==
The Calgary–Cambridge model was developed based on evidence from interviews of patients, and what made them successful. It is generally focussed on the patient and their experience. The guide of skills and techniques is generally seen as comprehensive.

== Disadvantages ==
The Calgary–Cambridge model has been criticized for creating a separation between the process of interviewing a patient and the information gained. The 71 skills are very difficult to incorporate simultaneously, making it more difficult to learn for clinicians than other techniques.

== History ==
The Calgary–Cambridge model is named after Calgary, Canada, and Cambridge, United Kingdom where the three authors worked. It is popular in medical education in many countries. It has also been adapted for veterinarians. Other models, such as the Global Consultation Rating Scale, have been based on the Calgary–Cambridge model.
