= Umberto Tombari =

Italian civil engineer (1900–1984)

- Born: 26 August 1900; Massa Marittima, Province of Grosseto, Kingdom of Italy
- Died: 12 January 1984 (aged 83); Grosseto, Italy
- Occupation: Civil engineer

Umberto Tombari (26 August 1900 – 12 January 1984) was an Italian civil engineer and architect active mainly in his native Tuscany. He played a key role in the urban development of Grosseto from the 1920s to the 1960s, designing residential, civic, and public buildings.

Tombari's early work showed an eclectic style with neoclassical references, which gradually evolved in the 1930s towards the monumental forms of Fascist architecture, reflecting the regime's stylistic preferences. In the later 1930s and postwar period, he adopted a more restrained rationalist approach.

== Life and career ==
Born in Massa Marittima, Tombari graduated in civil engineering from the University of Pisa in 1924 and moved to Grosseto in 1927, where he established his professional practice. He served as head of works for the Consorzio Maremma and as president of the provincial engineers' association.

His early works include the bridge over the Albegna in Orbetello and residential projects for the Cooperativa Edilizia Grossetana in the Portanuova suburb (1929–1933). He also designed urban developments in Marina di Grosseto, including the La Rotonda bathing facility (1933) and the Ivo Saletti seaside colony (1938). Over time, his style evolved from eclectic and neoclassical influences toward modernist and rationalist architecture, reflected in public buildings such as the Royal Industrial Technical School (1936–1940) and the Consorzio Agrario Building (1938–1940).

After World War II, Tombari continued designing public works, with the Grosseto headquarters of the Società Electrica Maremmana and the National Institute for Health Insurance (INAM) (1947–1950) notably standing out for their rationalist design. Other later works include the Swedish village of Riva del Sole in Castiglione della Pescaia (1957–1960) and the Misericordia Hospital in Grosseto (1959–1974). He died in Grosseto on 12 January 1984.

== Selected works ==
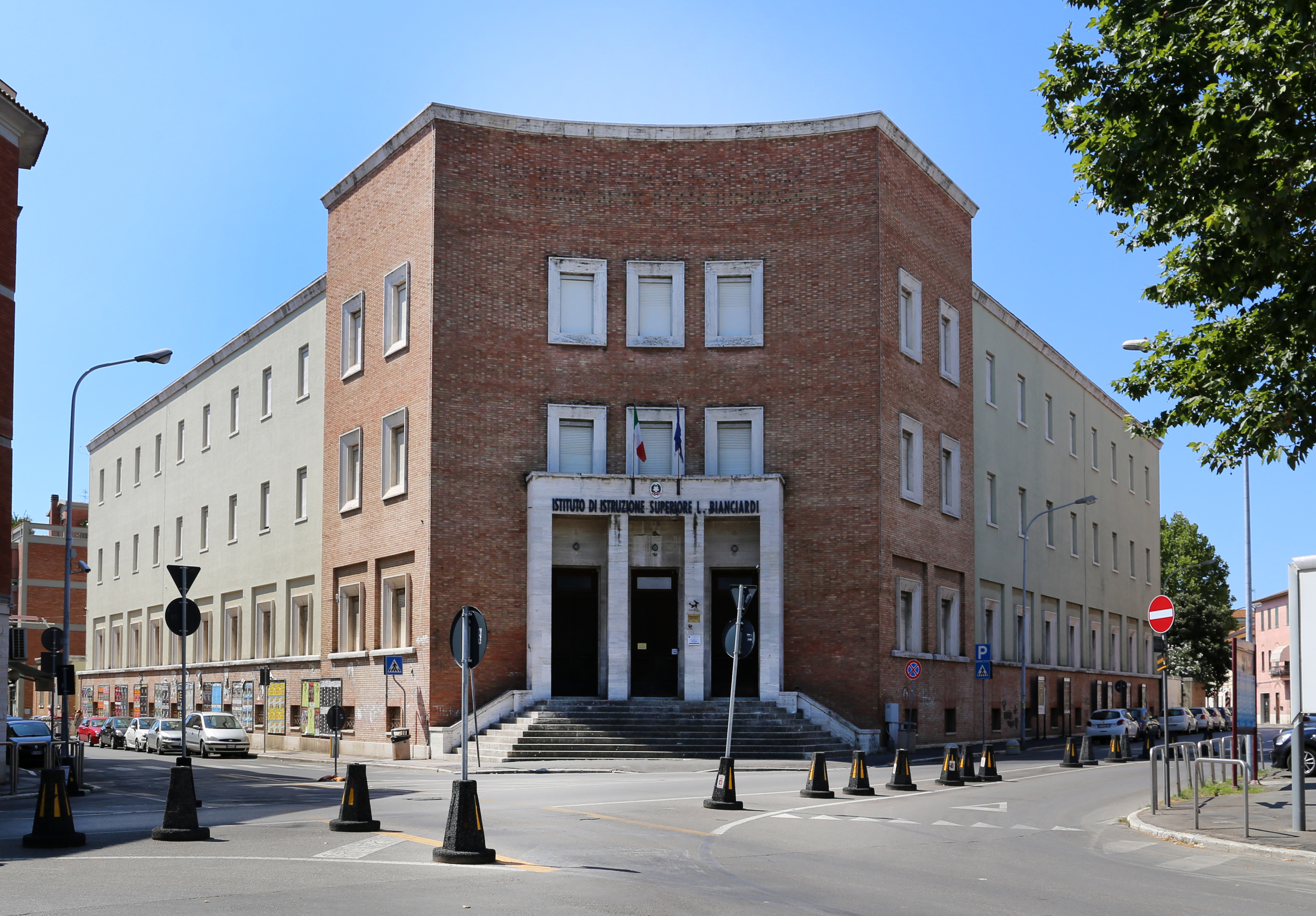
Former Royal Industrial Technical School, Grosseto

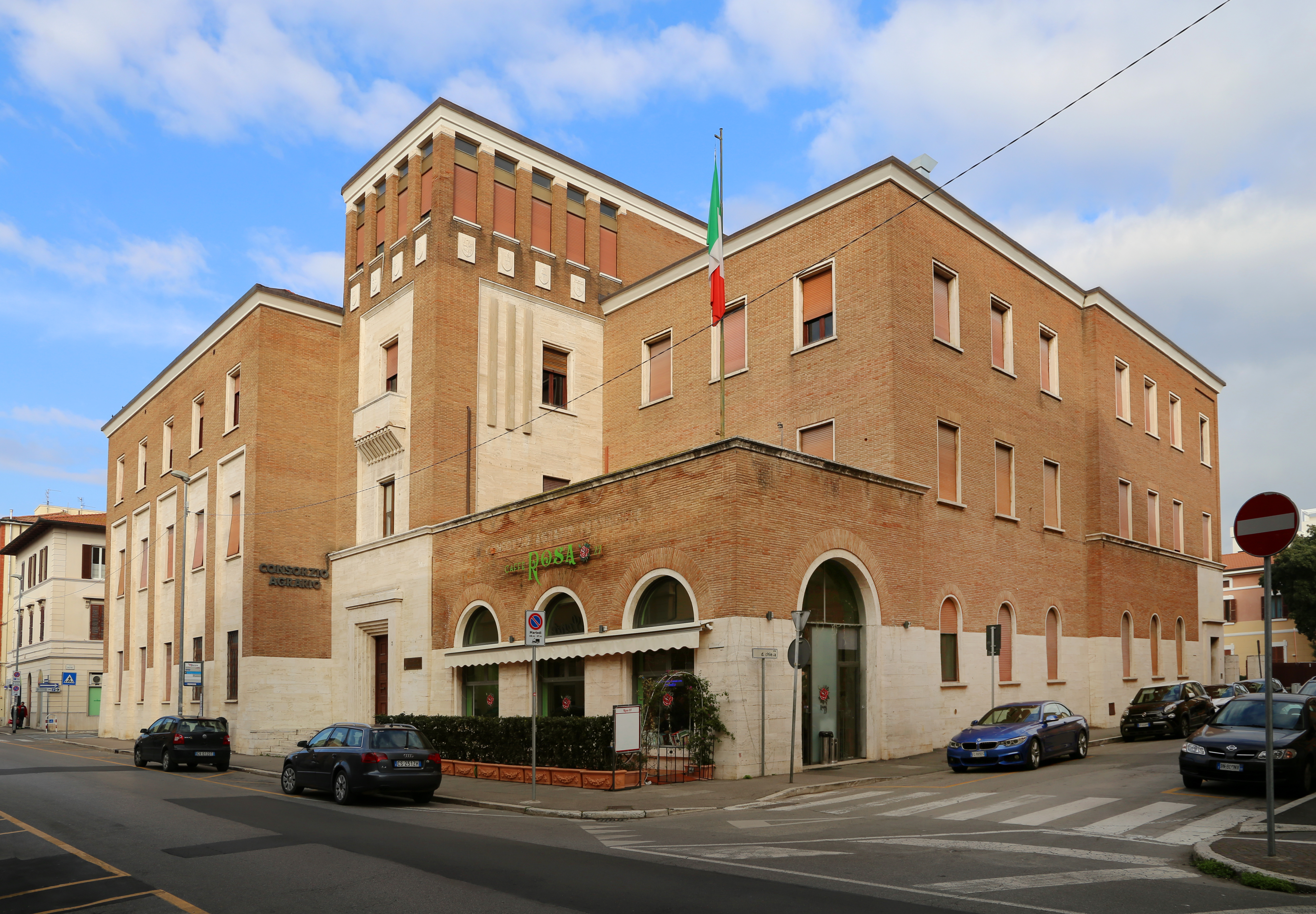
Consorzio Agrario Building, Grosseto

- Bridge over the Albegna, Orbetello (1927–1928)
- Villas of the Cooperativa Edilizia Grossetana, Grosseto (1929–1933)
- Villino Saracinelli on Via Roma, Grosseto (1930)
- La Rotonda resort, Marina di Grosseto (1933)
- Apartment buildings of the Cooperativa Costruzioni Case Economiche, Grosseto (1933–1936)
- Twin apartment buildings on Via Trento, Grosseto (1934)
- Villino Adriani on Via Gramsci, Grosseto (1934–1935)
- Villino Mencacci on Via Trento, Grosseto (1935)
- Villino Nieri on Via Guerrazzi, Grosseto (1935)
- Torriti Building on Via Damiano Chiesa, Grosseto (1935)
- Albergo Diurno Gorrieri, Grosseto (1936–1937, 1947)
- Royal Industrial Technical School, Grosseto (1936–1940)
- Ivo Saletti seaside colony, Marina di Grosseto (1938)
- Stadio Olimpico Comunale, Grosseto (1938–1948)
- Hotel San Lorenzo, Grosseto (1938–1939)
- Consorzio Agrario Building, Grosseto (1938–1940)
- Fabbri Housing Development, Grosseto (1939–1940)
- Società Electrica Maremmana headquarters, Grosseto (1947–1950)
- INAM Building, Grosseto (1947–1950)
- Village Riva del Sole, Castiglione della Pescaia (1957–1960) with Igino Chellini and Maria Cittadini
- Misericordia Hospital, Grosseto (1959–1974) with Mario Luzzetti

== Sources ==
- Crispolti, Enrico; Mazzanti, Anna; Quattrocchi, Luca, eds. (2006). Arte in Maremma nella prima metà del Novecento. Milan: Silvana.
- Catalani, Barbara; Del Francia, Marco; Tombari, Giovanni (2011). Itinerari di architettura contemporanea. Grosseto e provincia. Pisa: ETS.
- Celuzza, Mariagrazia; Papa, Mauro (2013). Grosseto visibile. Guida alla città e alla sua arte pubblica. Arcidosso: Effigi.
- Tombari, Giovanni (2004). Umberto Tombari. Un progettista nella provincia italiana (opere e progetti 1925-60). Roccastrada: Il mio amico.
