= Misericordia Hospital (Grosseto) =

- Azienda USL Toscana Sud Est
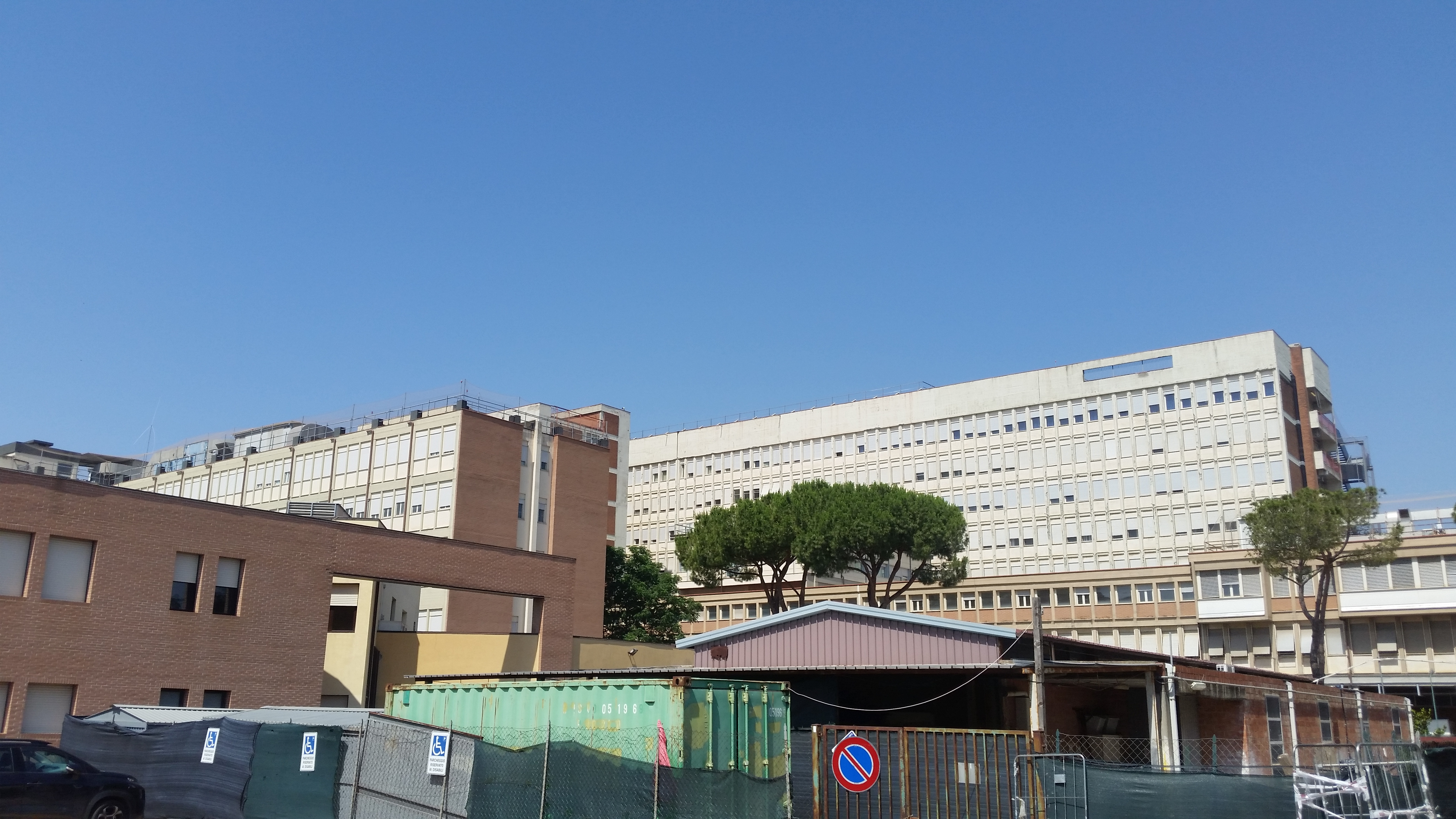

- Location of hospital on map of Tuscany

Geography
- Location: Grosseto, Tuscany, Italy
- Coordinates: 42°46′37″N 11°07′31″E

Organisation
- Type: General
- Patron: Antonio D'Urso

History
- Constructed: 17 November 1964
- Opened: 31 January 1974

Links
- Website: www.usl9.grosseto.it
- Lists: Hospitals in Italy

The Misericordia Hospital (Italian: Ospedale Misericordia di Grosseto) is a hospital located in Grosseto, Tuscany, Italy.

It is home to the International School of Robotic Surgery (Italian: Scuola internazionale di chirurgia robotica), founded in 2004 by Pier Cristoforo Giulianotti.

== History ==
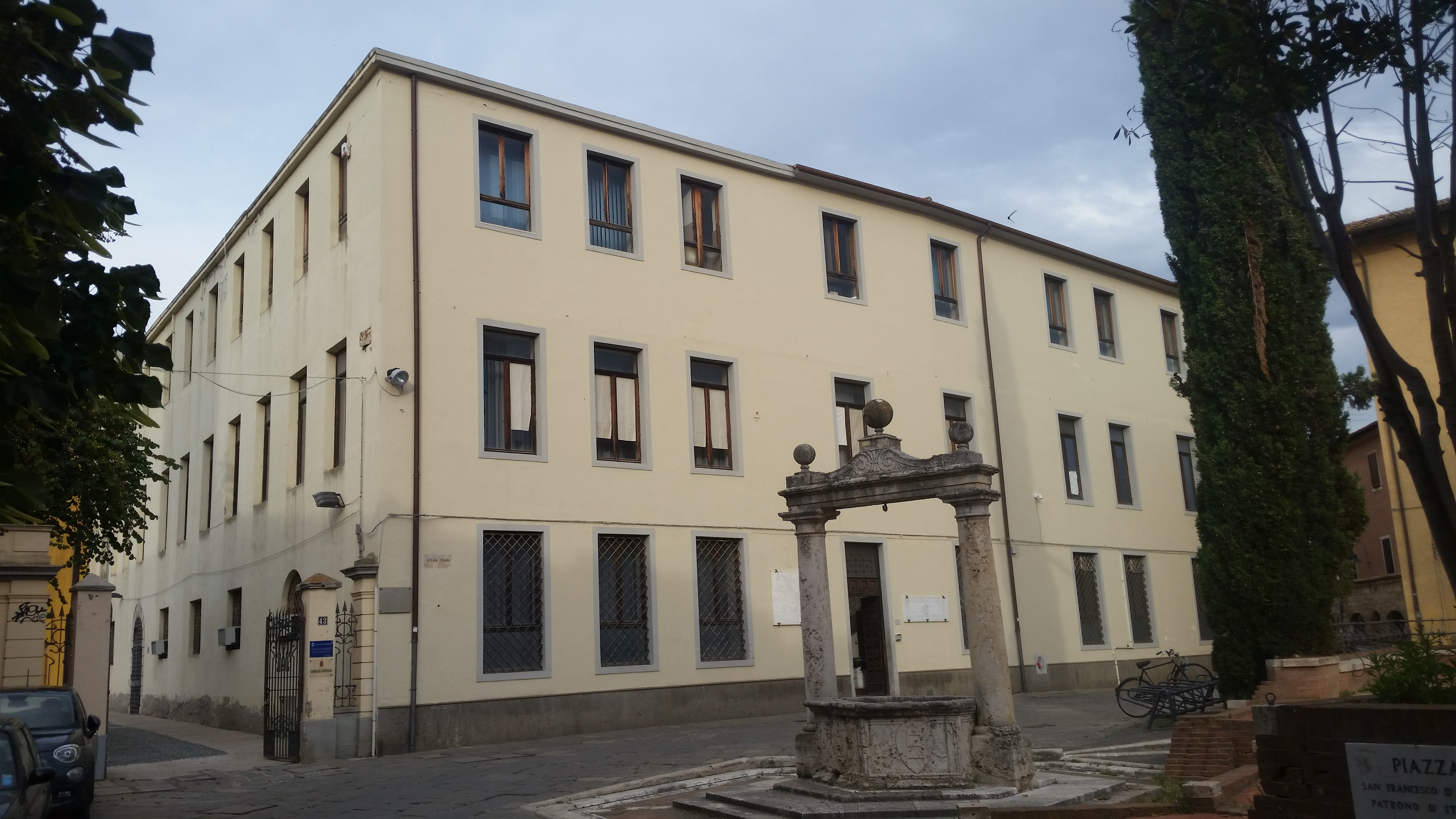
The former building of the hospital

The hospital was founded during the 13th century by the monks of the nearby church of San Francesco, and later became a branch of Santa Maria della Scala, Siena. It was renewed and re-opened in 1787 by the Grand Duke of Tuscany, Peter Leopold.

During the 1950s, the municipality of Grosseto considered the possibility of transferring the hospital to a modern building outside the old city, as the historic structure could not satisfy the needs of the increasing population. The new building was partly financed by the businessman Ferdinando Innocenti and the Banca Monte dei Paschi di Siena, and designed by architects Mario Luzzetti and Umberto Tombari. Construction began on 17 November 1964 and the hospital opened on 31 January 1974.

== Bibliography ==
- Catalani, Barbara; Del Francia, Marco; Tombari, Giovanni (2011). Itinerari di architettura contemporanea. Grosseto e provincia. Pisa: Edizioni ETS.
- Celuzza, Mariagrazia; Papa, Mauro (2013). Grosseto visibile. Guida alla città e alla sua arte pubblica. Arcidosso: Edizioni Effigi.
- Tombari, Umberto; Luzzetti, Mario (1974). Il nuovo Ospedale civile della città di Grosseto. Roccastrada: Vieri.
