= Medical education agency =

Medical education agencies are a specialty subset of advertising agencies that develop educational content for the Healthcare, Life Science and Biotechnology industries. Medical education agencies are divided into two categories: CME and non-CME.

== CME ==
Medical education agencies that develop Continuing medical education (most commonly referred to as CME) programs in the United States, do so within the strict guidelines set forth by the Accreditation Council for Continuing Medical Education (ACCME) and the Society for Academic Continuing Medical Education (SACME). Those who wish to offer CME courses, and thus employ the services of a medical education agency, must receive accreditation from the ACCME. Accreditation allows organizations, such as the American Nursing Certification Center (ANCC) to develop educational course content that physicians and other professional medical staff may use to satisfy annual CME requirements.

To avoid the risk of undue bias from commercial sponsorship, all accredited organizations must follow the commercial disclosure rules set out by the ACCME. Medical education agencies must familiarize themselves with these regulations in order to receive CME accreditation from one or more ACCME accredited organizations.

== Non-CME ==
Medical education agencies that develop Non-CME, also referred to as Promotional education, programs specialize in developing content whose commercial sponsorship is clearly outlined, and course content focuses on specific products or therapies in which the sponsoring organization has a financial interest.

== Delivery Mechanisms ==
The majority of content developed by medical education agencies supports one of two types of delivery mechanism: Instructor Led Training (ILT) and Self Directed Training (SDT).

=== Instructor Led Training ===
Instructor led training, ILT, is the practice of face-to-face delivery of information and learning material between an instructor and learners. Instructor lead training can take the form of didactic training, laboratory demonstration and/or clinical application.

Hospitals, Universities, Pharmaceutical and Medical device manufacturers may employ medical education agencies to develop specific content, or to apply Instructional Design principles to existing content to make it more readily understood by an instructor led audience. This will include developing informational structures to follow learning theories, targeting content toward a specific audience or set of audiences and

=== Self Directed Training ===
Self Directed Training, is the practice of gaining information from learning materials without an instructor present. Self-directed training takes many forms, including deployed eLearning content, textbooks, searchable databases of information and viewing of training presentations at one's own pace. Self-directed training often takes place through a web portal, a SCORM compliant Learning Management System (LMS) or a webcast engine.

Hospitals, Universities, Pharmaceutical and Medical device manufacturers may employ medical education agencies to develop specific content, or to apply Instructional Design principles to existing content, to make a product, technology or concept more readily understood by a self-directed audience. Medical education agencies also help learners to better understand complex content through interactivity, animation and virtual simulations of training content.
