= Perspectives on Medical Education =

- Discipline: Medical education
- Language: English
- Edited by: Erik Driessen

Publication details
- Former names: Netherlands Journal of Medical Education, Nederlandse Vereniging voor Medisch Onderwijs
- History: 1982-present
- Publisher: Ubiquity Press
- Frequency: Bimonthly
- Open access: Yes
- License: CC BY
- Impact factor: 4.113 (2021)

Standard abbreviations
- ISO 4: Perspect. Med. Educ.

Indexing
- ISSN: 2212-2761 (print); 2212-277X (web)

Links
- Journal homepage

Perspectives on Medical Education is a bimonthly peer-reviewed open-access medical journal, published by Ubiquity Press on behalf of the Nederlandse Vereniging voor Medisch Onderwijs (English: Netherlands Association of Medical Education). It covers research on clinical education practices. Erik Driessen is the editor-in-chief.

== History ==
The journal was established in 1982 as the Netherlands Journal of Medical Education and was initially published in Dutch. In 2012, the journal widened its scope, transforming into an English-language journal and changing its name to Perspectives on Medical Education. At the end of 2022, the journal ended its contract with its publisher Springer Nature and as of 2023 is published by Ubiquity Press.

In 2015, Perspectives on Medical Education was ranked one of the top five medical education journals that received attention in social media sources, such as Twitter and Facebook.

== Abstracting and indexing ==
The journal is abstracted and indexed in:

- Index Medicus/MEDLINE/PubMed
- Scopus
- ProQuest databases
- EBSCO databases
- Science Citation Index Expanded

According to the Journal Citation Reports, the journal has a 2021 impact factor of 4.113.
