= Pier Cristoforo Giulianotti =

Italian surgeon (born 1953)

- Born: 6 July 1953 (age 72); Filattiera, Province of Massa-Carrara, Italy
- Occupation: Surgeon

Pier Cristoforo Giulianotti (born 6 July 1953) is an Italian surgeon. He is a professor of Surgery and Chief of the Division of General, Minimally Invasive, and Robotic Surgery at the University of Illinois at Chicago. As of 2020 he has performed about 2,100 robotic-assisted surgeries and trained about 2,000 surgeons to perform the same.

== Early life and education ==
He received his medical degree from the University of Pisa. Besides a formal General Surgery residency, he has completed two additional residencies in Thoracic Surgery and Vascular Surgery. During the mid-1980s he became an expert in laparoscopic surgery.

== Career ==
Between 1998 and 2004, he became the Head of the Department of General Surgery at Misericordia Hospital in Grosseto. Already experienced in laparoscopic and advanced open surgery, he took the challenge with the introduction of the new robotic technology in 2000. In the last eight years, he has developed the largest program worldwide for robotic surgery. He has performed over 2100 minimally invasive surgeries, of which more than 914 have been robotic procedures. Dr. Giulianotti was the first in the world to perform over a dozen robotic surgical procedures, such as formal hepatic resection, lung resection and pancreatico-duodenectomy. Dr. Giulianotti is currently considered the foremost robotic surgeon worldwide.

In April 2008, Dr. Giulianotti and his team at University of Illinois Medical Center in Chicago inaugurated the Advanced Robotic Research and Training Laboratory, the only training center in the Midwest designed for robotic training.

Dr. Giulianotti is a founding member and was named the inaugural president of the Clinical robotic surgery association in 2009,
