= Medical education in Norway =

Medical education in Norway to become a professional physician is offered by the four major universities in Norway: the Norwegian University of Science and Technology, University of Bergen, University of Oslo, and University of Tromsø. The education takes 6 years and leads to a cand.med.-degree which is equivalent to Doctor of Medicine. The programme includes extensive clinical service that covers a wide range of patients, from primary health care in Norwegian municipalities to centralised specialist hospital departments, and from emergency medicine to caring for chronically ill patients.

Traditionally cand.med.-graduates would have to complete a 1.5 year internship to be granted legal authorization for practising medicine, but because Norway is part of the EFTA, all physicians that can practice medicine in any part of EU/EFTA must also be able to practice medicine in Norway. This has led the health authorities in Norway to give authorization upon graduating, so that Norwegian graduates would have the same rights as foreign graduates. Now the internship programme is a part of the specialist-education.

== Admissions ==
The requirements for admission is the completion of high school with additional science subjects (Mathematics R1 or S1+S2, Physics 1, Chemistry 1 and 2). The grade point requirements are dependent on the number of available spots in the programme, and because the number of appliers are extremely high on all of the medical programmes in Norway, the grade point requirement is considered very high relative to other study programmes in Norway.
