= Medical education in Panama =

Medical education in Panama is principally offered and developed by accredited and government recognized medical schools in the country. There are 5 medical schools in Panama, typically offering the Bachelor of Medicine and Surgery degrees. In Panama medical programs are divided into two types: undergraduate entry and graduate entry.

== Entrance ==
Undergraduate entry degrees are typically 6 years in duration and commonly tend to draw students entering directly from high school; while graduate entry degrees are typically 4 years in length, and draw a university graduate with a current 4 years Bachelor's degree required for entry. These entries provide the medical programs with a variety in the age range and academic backgrounds of the participants. The graduate entry program still confers a bachelor's degree in Medicine; although it is a graduate entry program, it does not confer a postgraduate degree in itself.

== Requirements ==
In order to practice medicine in the Republic, or enter a residency program in Panama it is required to be Panamenian citizen.

Other requirements include:

- First year rotatory Internship: Qualified medical practitioners must successfully undertake and complete one year of supervised practice, generally known as an internship. Internship is undertaken in hospital positions accredited for this purpose.
- 2 year rural Internship: Upon successful conclusion of the first intern year, doctors are required to undertake and complete a second year of internship at an assigned government health institution. Once this requirement is fulfilled the medical practitioners qualify for a full registration in the Medical Board and are licensed to engage in independent medical practice in Panama

== Medical universities ==
Universities with undergraduate entry medical programs only:

- Universidad de Panama
- Columbus University
- Universidad Latina de Panama
- Universidad Latinoamericana de Ciencia y Tecnología ULACIT
- Universidad Autónoma de Chiriquí UNACHI, The only one university, outside of Panama City, which offers a complete medical program. This university is located in David, Chiriqui.

Universities with graduate entry medical programs only:

- International School of Medical Sciences ISMS

All the graduate entry programs share a similar application process at this time and comparable to the requirements in the United States. Candidates are first required to have a Premedical Degree in an approved University. A 4-year bachelor's degree is required.
