= Interruption (speech) =

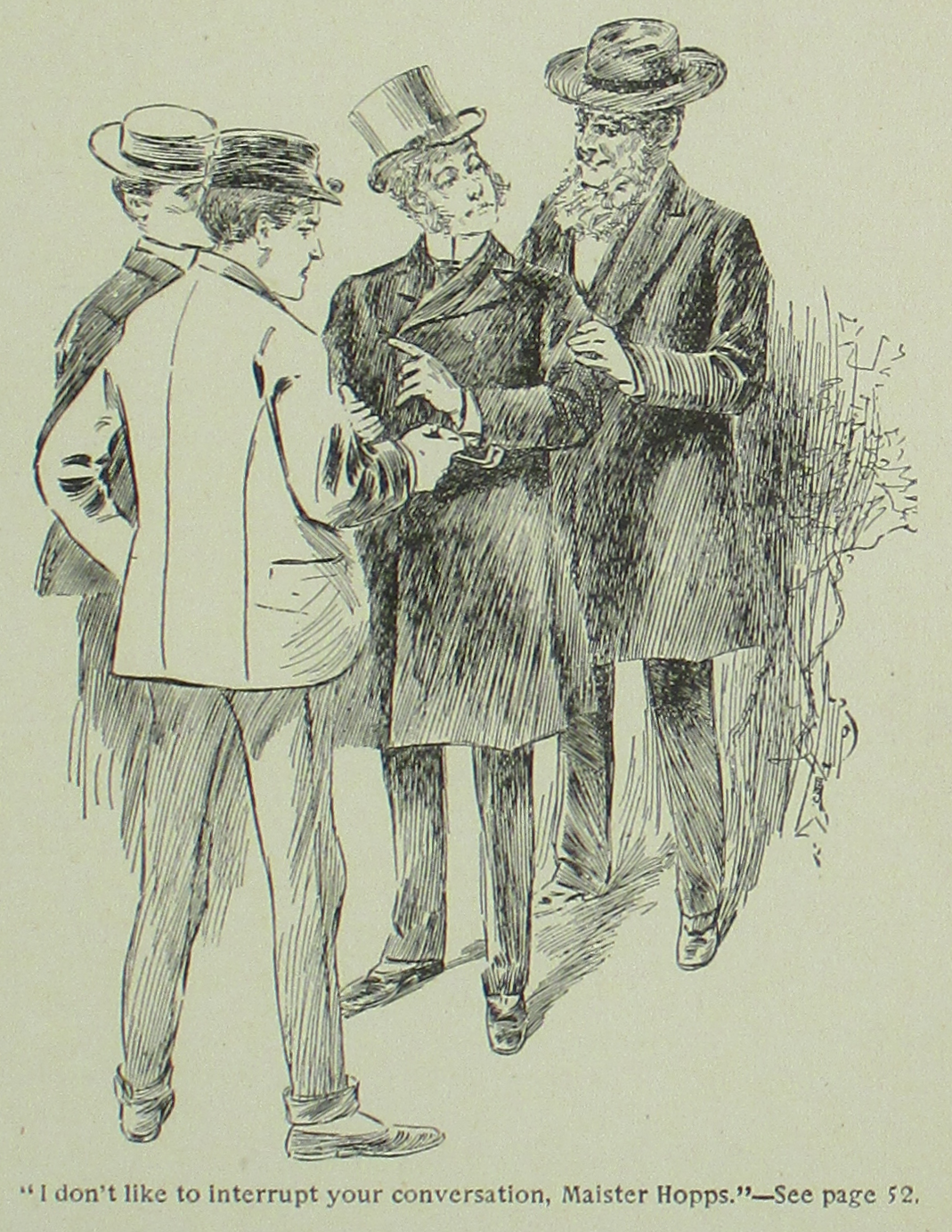
"I don't like to interrupt your conversation, Maister Hopps." (illustration from Beside the Bonnie Brier Bush, 1899)

An interruption is a speech action when one person breaks in to interject while another person is talking. Linguists, social psychologists, anthropologists, and sociologists are among the social scientists who have studied and identified patterns of interruption that may differ by gender, social status, race/ethnicity, culture, and political orientation.

== Turn-taking and overlaps ==
Harvey Sacks, the sociologist who launched the field of conversation analysis, worked with linguist Emanuel Schegloff and Gail Jefferson in the 1970s to analyze how turn-taking was organized in speech events such as everyday conversations. Speech events are organized so that only one person speaks at a time and to provide for orderly ways to change speakers. Sacks et al. thought that the process of turn-taking is subconscious.

Overlaps occur when two or more speakers talk simultaneously.

== Types of interruptions ==
Communication analyst Julia A. Goldberg uses conversation analysis to define three types of conversational interruptions. Relationally neutral interruptions are interjections by the listener that seek to repair, repeat, or clarify something the speaker just said. During this type of interruption, the interrupter does not intend to exert power over the speaker, or to establish rapport with the speaker. The act of interruption itself is understood as neutral in this instance. Another type of interruption defined by Goldberg is the power interruption, where the interrupter breaks in and cuts off the speaker as a way to display some social power. Power interruptions are understood as acts of conflict and competition, and are viewed as rude, hostile, disrespectful, and/or uncaring about the speaker and/or what the speaker is saying. A rapport interruption is designed to display mutuality and generally conveys the impression that the interrupter understands and empathizes with the speaker and/or the content of the speech, and is interpreted as collaborative and cooperative.

Power interruptions are also analyzed by Zimmerman and West, sociologists who note that the people who seek to be socially dominant exert their power over others through interrupting their speech. Zimmerman and West also analyzed how sex roles shape interruption patterns. Why participants interrupt each other might be an incentive for sociolinguists, or sometimes psychologists, to investigate this issue. One may begin to say something but suddenly, someone else interrupts to finish the sentence instead or holding the floor to say another idea without giving an opportunity to let others finish what they want to say. This is frustrating even the first speaker's sentence or thought goes along with the interrupter's.

== Gender and interruption patterns ==
Since the late-1970s, social scientists have studied the effect gender has on interruption patterns and other components of verbal communication. The findings of these studies are mixed, with some finding gender differences, while others did not. Among those that found gender differences are sociologists Don Zimmerman and Candace West, who used male dominance theory to claim that men interrupted women to assert their social dominance over women. Zimmerman and West's work discovered that interruptions were more evenly distributed in conversations involving same-sex speakers, while in cross-sex interactions, men were much more likely to interrupt women. Zhao and Gantz analyzed fictional TV shows to claim that male characters used disruptive interruptions more than female characters, while female characters more often used cooperative interruptions. They note, however, that the apparent gender differences in interruption patterns are affected by differences in social status among the TV characters. Goldberg notes that when conversational context and content are analyzed, interruptions may be seen as power displays, rapport displays, or as neutral acts that may or may not be shaped by the gender of the speaker. Linguist Makri-Tsilipakou discovered that men and women use "simultaneous speech" at about the same rate, but the sexes differ as to their interpretation of the meaning of the interruption. Women use simultaneous speech as a sign of support and agreement, while men use it either as support for the other's speech or to dissent from other speakers or from their viewpoint. Drass, a social psychologist, found that gender identity, as separate from biological sex, was an important variable, with persons who were more male-identified being more likely to interrupt than persons who were more female-identified.

Conversely, a study by Murray and Covelli used Zimmerman and West's coding strategies on their own dataset of conversations to find that women interrupted men more often than men interrupted women. According to James and Clarke, this pattern is especially evident in conversational situations where women felt more expertise, and thus may have felt that their interruptions were more legitimate.

=== Manterrupting ===
The term manterrupting was coined in early 2015 by Jessica Bennett in an article that appeared in Time. Bennett defines the term as "[u]nnecessary interruption of a woman by a man." During the 2016 American presidential debates, the term was applied to candidate Donald Trump, who interrupted Hillary Clinton dozens of times during the first and second debates.

== Status and interruption patterns ==
Interruptions work as a status-organizing cue. In other words, conversational participants use cues such as perceptions of prestige, power, social class, gender, race and age, to organize small-group hierarchies. Interruption patterns differ by social status, with persons of higher social status, such as belonging to a social group who has more prestige or power, interrupting persons with lower status. Jacobi and Schweers analyzed transcripts of oral arguments made before the U.S. Supreme Court to find that senior justices interrupted their junior colleagues more frequently than the reverse. Kollock et al. studied conversations among couples, including male couples, female couples, and mixed sex couples. They found that partners who were considered to have more social power interrupted their partners more often, regardless of the gender composition of the dyad. In TV shows, characters who are lower in the status hierarchy are scripted to display a "sense of defiance" that allows them to interrupt more aggressively than persons who hold a mid-level status. A study of interviews between physicians and patients found that physicians, who are considered to hold higher status than their patients in terms of prestige, are much more likely to interrupt their patients, regardless of the sex of the patient or the physician. Patients interrupted senior physicians at a lower rate than they interrupted doctors who were in training, indicating that the senior physicians are regarded as having a higher status than their junior colleagues. In contrast, a study of physician-patient interactions among six different statuses, from low to high, indicated that patients tended to interrupt physicians more than the reverse, and that high and low status physicians did not differ in the number of times that they interrupted their patients. This study, by Irish and Hall, noted that status thus appears to be less of an indicator of the likelihood of interruptions among physicians and patients.

In addition to social status affecting interruption patterns, interruptions also affect social status. In a study of mixed-sex and same-sex dyads, Farley discovered that the interrupters gained social status after they interrupted, while those who were interrupted lost social status. This study also found that people who interrupted also lost in terms of likeability. To note, culture is influential in communication; participants of the same culture may share the same beliefs regarding how-to-act when interacting with each other. It has been noticed that thorough interaction depends on shared understanding of behavioral basis. Furthermore, cross-cultural disparity in turn-taking is potential problem in communication.

== Race/ethnicity and interruption patterns ==
Don Zimmerman and Candace West also claim in their study that whites interrupt blacks as a strategy to exert their power and dominance.

== Cultural differences ==
Interruptions, and how people interpret interruptions, differ by culture and language. Makri-Tsilpakou notes that some languages and cultures have higher tolerance for simultaneous talk, and that interpretations of interruptions may differ depending on cultural context.

== Political orientation ==
Political orientation, e.g. where a person falls on the conservative to liberal political continuum, also shapes the likelihood that people will interrupt others or will be interrupted themselves. Jacobi and Schweers, in their study of transcripts of oral arguments made before the U.S. Supreme Court, found that conservative justices and advocates interrupt more often than liberals.
