= Medical Tribune =

Scientific journal

Medical Tribune is a weekly medical newspaper originally published in Germany where it has flourished since 1966, when it was founded by Günther Stroh. The Medical Tribune newspaper has been in the Suddeutscher Verlag Media Group since 2000, and has been published in the Medical Tribune Group in Switzerland, Austria, Poland, Czechia and Turkey.

The Austrian edition of the Medical Tribune (SSN: 0344-8304) is part of the portfolio of MedTrix GmbH Austria (headquarters in Vienna, managing director: Friedrich Tomaschek) and since 2020 has been published fortnightly, on Wednesdays, with a circulation of 14,500 copies. Before that, the newspaper appeared weekly.

== Medical Tribune Publishing ==
Medical Tribune Publishing is a publishing company founded in November 2006 as part of the Medical Tribune Group in Istanbul.

The Medical Tribune Türkiye newspaper has been published every 14 days since January 2007.

== Other works from this publisher ==
- Medical Tribune Kolloquium
- Vet Dergi ("Veterinary Magazine")

== Other works with this title ==
- A monthly magazine, The Medical Tribune, was published beginning in 1878; Volume 9 dates from 1895.
- Arthur M. Sackler founded an identically named publication in New York in 1960.
