= Continuing medical education =

Professional development for physicians

Continuing medical education (CME) is continuing education (CE) that helps those in the medical field maintain competence and learn about new and developing areas of their field. These activities may take place as live events, written publications, online programs, audio, video, or other electronic media. Content for these programs is developed, reviewed, and delivered by faculty who are experts in their individual areas. Similar to the process used in academic journals, any potentially conflicting financial relationships for faculty members must be both disclosed and resolved in a meaningful way. However, critics complain that drug and device manufacturers often use their financial sponsorship to bias CME activities toward marketing their own products. Continuing medical education is part of what's known as the continuum of medical education, following undergraduate medical education (UME)—the training that leads to the M.D. or D.O. degree—and succeeding graduate medical education (GME).

== Historical context ==
Continuing medical education is not a new concept. From essentially the beginning of institutionalized medical instruction (medical instruction affiliated with medical colleges and teaching hospitals), health practitioners continued their learning by meeting with their peers. Grand rounds, case discussions, and meetings to discuss published medical papers constituted the continuing learning experience. CME credit was first established for physicians in the United States in 1958 by the American Academy of Family Physicians. In the 1950s through to the 1980s, CME was increasingly funded by the pharmaceutical industry. Concerns regarding informational bias (both intentional and unintentional) led to increasing scrutiny of the CME funding sources. The Accreditation Council for Continuing Medical Education (ACCME) developed standards to keep what they define as ineligible companies from being able to influence the content of CME activities. Most recently updated in 2022, the ACCME's Standards for Integrity and Independence in Continuing Education have been adopted by the accrediting bodies of multiple health professions within the United States. The pharmaceutical industry has also developed guidelines regarding drug detailing and industry sponsorship of CME, such as the Pharmaceutical Advertising Advisory Board (PAAB) and Canada's Research-Based Pharmaceutical Companies (Rx&D).

== Requirements ==
In the United States, many state licensing boards and specialty certification boards require CME for medical professionals to maintain their licenses/certifications. Within the United States, requirements for CME activities for physicians are regulated by the American Academy of Family Physicians (AAFP) and the American Medical Association (AMA) in conjunction with the Accreditation Council for Continuing Medical Education (ACCME) and the American Osteopathic Association (AOA) for the respective credit systems. Entities such as state legislatures and specialty certification boards regulate what/how much CME must be obtained by physicians.

In Canada, certification is provided by the Royal College of Physicians and Surgeons of Canada (RCPSC) and the College of Family Physicians of Canada (CFPC). The RCPSC is responsible for the development and implementation of all certifying examinations in each specialty other than family medicine. Specialist physicians who join the Royal College as fellows maintain their knowledge, skills, competence and performance through participating in the maintenance of certification program. For each five-year cycle, fellows of the college are required to document 400 credits, with a minimum of 40 credits obtained in each year of the cycle. Credits are earned at one to two credits per hour, based on the type of learning activity. The CFPC requires 250 credit-hours over a five-year cycle. Fifty credits must be obtained for each year of the cycle. To earn and maintain fellowship within the college, an additional 24 credit-hours of higher level learning are also required over each learning cycle. Similarly, each province and territory requires documentation of ongoing CME for licensure.

== Physician credit systems ==
In the United States there are three major physician credit systems:

- American Academy of Family Physicians (AAFP)
  - Credit system established in 1958
  - Includes Prescribed and Elective credit
  - Activity level accreditation by the AAFP
  - Audience is family physicians
- American Medical Association (AMA)
  - Credit system established in 1968
  - Includes AMA PRA Category 1 Credit™ and AMA PRA Category 2 Credit™
  - The ACCME accredits CME providers that award AMA PRA Category 1 Credit™
  - The AMA, as the owner of the AMA PRA Credit System, awards credit directly to physicians for some types of activities
  - Audience is all MDs, DOs, and individuals who have completed an equivalent medical degree from another country
- American Osteopathic Association
  - Credit system established in 1973
  - Includes Categories 1A, 1B, 2A and 2B
  - The AOA is the accrediting body for organizations that offer AOA credit
  - Audience is Osteopathic Physicians (DOs)
  - Production of CME courses

There are other physician credit systems in other countries.

=== Options for Earning CME ===
Formal: includes CME activities that have been formally certified by the credit system/accrediting body or the accredited CME provider. All systems have harmonized requirements including principles of educational design, evidence-based content, and the ACCME Standards for Integrity and Independence in Accredited Continuing Education. Examples include AAFP Prescribed and Elective, AMA PRA Category 1 Credit™, and AOA Categories 1A and 2A.

Informal: includes self-directed learning activities that are not certified for credit by a credit system/accrediting body or the accredited CME provider. The parameters are defined by the credit system and may not include activities produced by or with influence from ineligible companies. Examples include AAFP Prescribed and Elective, AMA PRA Category 2 Credit™, and AOA 1B and 2B. Some entities that require physicians to get CME credit, such as a state licensing board, don't accept these types of activities to meet their CME requirements.

=== Production of CME courses ===
Continuing medical education activities are developed and delivered by a variety of organizations, including but not limited to:

- Professional associations
- Medical education agencies
- Hospitals
- Educational institutions, including universities and medical schools.

In 2008, professional certification for CME planners was established by the National Commission for Certification of CME Professionals which is earned by standardized exam, and confers the Certified CME Professional (CCMEP) certificate. NC-CME maintains a registry of these certified professionals. As of June 2011, the Registry included 320 professionals.

The CCMEP has since transitioned to the Certified Healthcare CPD Professional (CHCP) certification and is owned by the Alliance for Continuing Education in the Health Professions.

== Criticism of industry sponsorship ==
In the 2000s, critics, such as Morris and Taitsman, advocated that the medical profession eliminate commercial support for CME.

The 2022 update to the ACCME's standards continues to severely restrict potential influence by ineligible companies for all accredited CME activities, whether or not there is commercial support. Despite past ACCME requirements that program content be free of the influence of commercial interests, "CME providers can easily pitch topics designed to attract commercial sponsorship," and sponsors can award grants to programs that support their marketing strategies. In 2009 the Institute of Medicine said that CME has become too reliant on industry funding that "tends to promote a narrow focus on the products and to neglect provisions of a broader education on alternative strategies," such as communication and prevention.

For example, gabapentin (Neurontin), was approved by the U.S. Food and Drug Administration for adjunctive therapy in epilepsy, but Warner-Lambert sponsored CME activities that encouraged its use for off-label indications. In 2004, the U.S. Department of Justice brought civil and criminal charges against Warner-Lambert, which Warner-Lambert settled for $430 million, alleging that Warner-Lambert paid kickbacks to doctors in the form of lavish trips to attend presentations about off-label uses. In 2010, AstraZeneca PLC was fined $520 million in the United States for off-label promotion to doctors for their anti-psychotic drug, Seroquel.

Industry-sponsored CMEs can violate federal statutes, according to the U.S. Department of Health and Human Services. "When a pharmaceutical manufacturer rewards high-prescribing physicians by directing a CME provider to pay (or overpay) them as CME faculty, consultants, or members of a speaker's bureau," wrote Morris and Taitsman.
