= Accreditation Council for Continuing Medical Education =

- Abbreviation: ACCME
- Formation: 1981
- Purpose: "To assure and advance quality learning for healthcare professionals that drives improvements in patient care."
- Headquarters: Chicago, Illinois, U.S.
- Official language: English
- President and CEO: Graham McMahon
- Executive VP: Kate Regnier
- Affiliations: American Board of Medical Specialties; American Hospital Association; American Medical Association; Association of American Medical Colleges; Association for Hospital Medical Education; Council of Medical Specialty Societies; Federation of State Medical Boards of the United States
- Staff: 40 employees
- Website: www.accme.org

The Accreditation Council for Continuing Medical Education (ACCME) sets and enforces standards in physician continuing education (or "lifelong learning") within the United States. It acts as the overseeing body for institutions and organizations providing continuing medical education (CME) activities. Founded in 1981, the ACCME sets standards and certifies that institutions and organizations meet those standards. "CME credit" is part of special programs offered by other organizations (e.g. the American Medical Association) and is not the purview of the ACCME.

The 2025 ACCME Data Report includes information on 1,518 accredited CME providers that offered more than 242,000 accredited educational activities. As of 2026, the organization has 40 employees.
