= Virginia Tacci =

Italian equestrian

- Born: 1566 or 1567
- Died: after 1581
- Occupation: Jockey
- Known for: First woman to ride in Sienna's Palio horse race

Virginia Tacci (1566 or 1567 – d. after 1581), was an Italian equestrian who was the first woman to ride in a famous horse race in Siena.

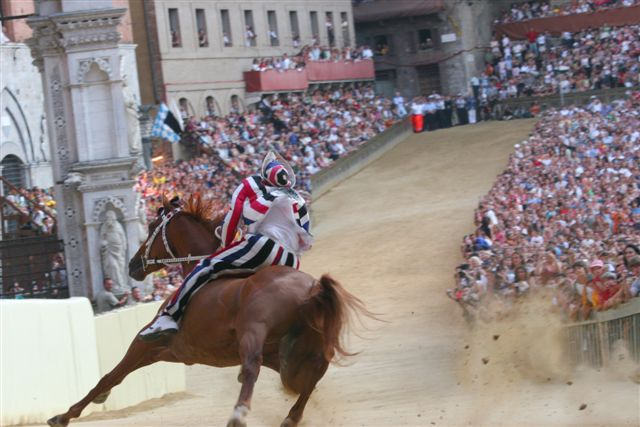
Horse and jockey (fantino) turning a bend of the race course at Piazza del Campo

Tacci rode on 15 August 1581 in the challenging race that was the predecessor of today's Palio di Siena. As a 15-year-old girl, she came to be regarded as a role model for women in Siena and has been remembered as a pioneer female jockey.

== The race ==
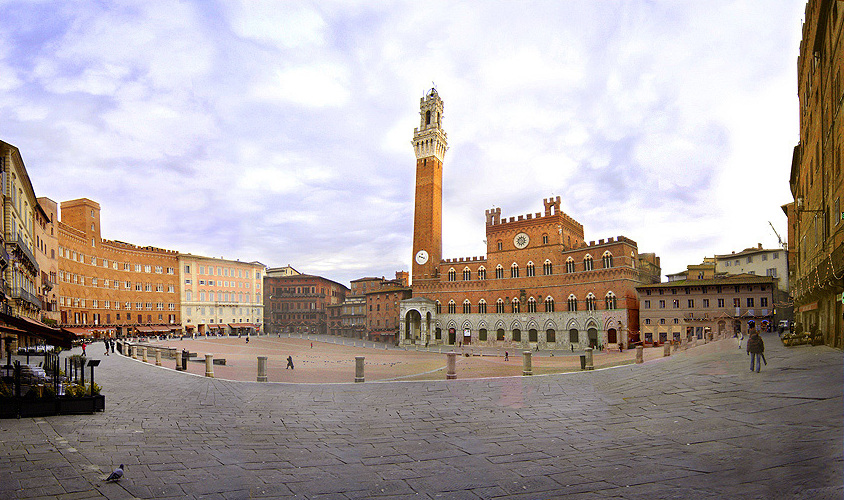
Piazza del Campo in normal times.

The historic race is part of the city's celebration of the Feast of the Assumption on August 15.

The race, which is still run today, takes place in the center plaza of Siena with ten horses competing, representing only 10 of the 17 city districts (the lucky ten are chosen in part by lottery). Each jockey is chosen by leaders of each contrade, or city ward. The racecourse is held inside the city's main plaza, the Piazza del Campo, which is paved with a hard surface, but covered with layers of earth for this occasion.

In 1581, the jockeys were small and light (usually boys) and rode bareback around the track lined with spectators and buildings. Races were known to be dangerous to both horses and riders and took less than 90 seconds from start to finish.

=== Tacci's ride ===
Tacci was selected by Siena's Drago ward.

It was therefore the Contrada dell'Aquila that organized the festival [in 1581], which also presented those of the Liofante (the current Tower), the Wave, the Montone, the Giraffa, the Goose, the Lupa and the Drago. They all brought their horse with a little boy as a rider. But the Dragon, instead of a young man, placed a peasant girl on his steed.

The Count of Montauto wrote about the race at the time:

Among the most ridiculous and marvelous things one sees, is that a villanella of about 14 has a barbarian to run: and she is on it with such confidence and gracefulness that it is something not to be believed. With her an infinite number of people, she is so well suited to that act of riding; so much so that it seems that other women envy her and that some plan to learn that art, seeing that riding well is a good way to acquire the grace of the men. This young girl began to practice in the course: and the other day, because the foul-mouthed horse jumped across certain beams, not without manifest danger of breaking her neck, she did not get lost, nor did she sign to fall, but with much art and dexterity she corrected and retained it.

On the day of the race, Tacci fell from her steed before finishing. Still, it was noted, "It is known that the Governor of the Contrada gave Tacci a beautiful horse."

=== Legacy ===
The next woman to ride in the Palio did so almost four hundred years later, in 1957, when Rosanna Bonelli rode using the nickname Diavola for the Contrada dell'Aquila. She did not finish the race because she was thrown off her horse during the race.
