= March of the Palio =

Ancient hymn

Marcia del Palio
English: March of the Palio
- City anthem of Siena, Italy
- Also known as: Squilli la fe' (English: May the faith shrill)
- Lyrics: Idilio dell'Era, Bruno Ancilli
- Music: Pietro Formichi, 1880
- Adopted: 2 July 1885

The "Marcia del Palio" (in English: "March of the Palio"), commonly also called Squilli la fe' (in English: "May the faith shrill"), is an ancient hymn that accompanies the historical costume parade called Corteo Storico that precedes the Palio of Siena.

Between one stop and another, in fact, while the representatives of the districts parade at the reel of the "Diana's pattern"; the musicians of the Palazzo Pubblico play the march of the Palio while the trumpets of the Municipality play the blasts of the party on the silver clarions.

== History ==
The March of the Palio was composed by Pietro Formichi in 1880 for the municipal band of the city of Siena, which he then conducted jointly with the annexed music school. From a musical point of view it is a 2/4 composition for fanfare, or for band formations with exclusively brass instruments, originally created without a sung accompaniment. The lyrics, written by the poet Idilio dell'Era and modified by Bruno Ancilli, were added later.

The march was performed for the first time during the historical parade of 2 July 1885 and is still played today in Piazza del Campo and in the city streets, during the passage of the procession from the Prefecture to the Casato street, from the fanfare of the Palazzo Pubblico, which parades at the beginning of the Corteo Storico, behind the Macemen and the standard bearer of the Sienese gonfalon, and is made up of 12 drummers, 18 trumpets and 30 musicians with various brass instruments.

The blasts of the palace trumpets for the Carroccio, on the other hand, date back to 1904 and are the work of Salvatore Giaretta.

Over the years the March of the Palio has reached such a level of appreciation by the Sienese citizens that it has now become an anthem of the city, usually sung even outside the Palio of Siena, on the occasion of sports competitions of local football and basket teams, together with the Canto della Verbena.

== Lyrics ==
The verses of the March of the Palio written by Idilio dell'Era and revised by Bruno Ancilli.

| Marcia del Palio (Italian) Squilli la fe'! S'armi e vinca l'onore di te, dolce fiore, Siena gentil! Mille vessilli scintillano al sol, sventola il bianco col nero color, passano i duci dagli alti cimier! Ecco di Siena si desta il valor. Ridono le bianche trifore del maggior palazzo antico. Fremono, snelli, i barberi nell'entrone senese avito. Ecco il segnal! Già la gran pista è aperta: i barberi in gruppo, al canape van. Fuggono veloci nella polvere, arde in ognun la gloria! Freme e grida il popolo agitandosi! Ecco il segnal: vittoria! Siena dal dolce idioma e dall'amato ostello: Siena, tu sei di Roma specchio gentile e bello | March of the Palio (English translation) May the faith shrill! May the honor be armed and win of you, sweet flower, gentle Siena! A thousand banners sparkle in the sun, waving white with black color, the commanders with high crests pass! Now the value of Siena awakens. The white three-light windows of the largest ancient palace laugh. The slender horses are trembling inside the ancestral Sienese portal. Here is the signal! The great track is already open: together, the horses go to the starting line. They flee swiftly into the dust, glory burns in everyone! The people shudder and shout in excitement! Here is the signal: victory! Siena with a sweet language and a beloved welcome: Siena, you are the gentle and beautiful mirror of Rome. |

== See also ==
- Republic of Siena
- Ports of the Republic of Siena
- Palio di Siena
- Coinage of the Republic of Siena

== Bibliography ==
- Virgilio Grassi, Le Contrade di Siena e le loro feste - Il Palio attuale, Siena, Edizioni Periccioli, 1972.
- Sergio Profeti, Il segreto della mossa, Siena, Edizioni Sunto, 1985.
- William Heywood, Nostra donna d'agosto e il Palio di Siena, Siena, Protagon Editori Toscani, 1993, ISBN 978-88-8024-002-0
