= Tacci =

Tacci is an Italian surname. Notable people with the surname include:

- Giovanni Tacci Porcelli known as Giovanni Tacci (1863–1928), Italian prelate of the Catholic Church
- Virginia Tacci (1566 or 1567 – d. after 1581), Italian equestrian
