= Bravio delle botti =

Annual race held in the Italian town of Montepulciano

Coordinates: 43.1000°N 11.7833°E

External videos
- Official video of the 2012 race
- Official video of the 2013 race
- Official video of the 2014 race
- Official video of the 2015 race
- Official video of the 2016 race
- Official video of the 2017 race
- Official video of the 2018 race
- Official video of the 2019 race
- Official video of the 2021 race
- Official video of the 2022 race
- Official video of the 2023 race

The Bravio delle botti (Bravio of the barrels) is an annual race held in the Italian town of Montepulciano since 1974, replacing an equivalent horserace dating back to 1373. Teams of two runners (spingitori) representing the eight districts of the town (contrade) compete to be the first to roll an 80 kg wine barrel through the streets of the historic centre from the Colonna del Marzocco to the finish on the Piazza Grande, the cathedral square. The total distance is approximately 1800m and is uphill for nearly the entire course. As the streets are narrow and the barrels cumbersome to manoeuvre, collisions are frequent.

The word "bravio" derives from the Latin Bravium meaning "to be won". It refers to the prize given to the winning Contrada - a painted cloth bearing the image of the patron saint of the city.

The Contrade, and their colours, are:

- Cagnano: green and blue
- Collazzi: yellow and green
- Le Coste: yellow and blue
- Gracciano: green and black
- Poggiolo: white and blue
- San Donato: white and red
- Talosa: yellow and red
- Voltaia: red and black

Related festivities are held throughout the week of the Bravio including processions, religious blessing, practice runs, and parties hosted at each of the team headquarters.

== Winners ==
Year	Winning Contrada
1974	Gracciano
1975	Cagnano
1976	Cagnano
1977	Cagnano
1978	Le Coste
1979	Talosa
1980	Le Coste
1981	Gracciano
1982	Poggiolo
1983	Le Coste
1984	Cagnano
1985	Cagnano

Year	Winning Contrada
1986	Cagnano
1987	Cagnano
1988	Poggiolo
1989	Cagnano
1990	Cagnano
1991	Cagnano
1992	San Donato
1993	San Donato
1993*	San Donato
1994	San Donato
1995	San Donato
1996	Voltaia

Year	Winning Contrada
1997	Gracciano
1998	San Donato
1999	Gracciano
2000	Gracciano
2001	San Donato
2002	Le Coste
2003	Le Coste
2004	Le Coste
2005	Le Coste
2006	Le Coste
2007	Talosa
2008	Talosa

Year	Winning Contrada
2009	Talosa
2010	Gracciano
2011	Gracciano
2012	Poggiolo
2013	Voltaia
2014	Voltaia
2015	Poggiolo
2016	Voltaia
2017	Voltaia
2018	Poggiolo
2019	Voltaia
2020**	N/A
2021	Collazzi
2022	Talosa
2023	Voltaia

- A second race was held in 1993 in support of the Italian Telethon
- Race cancelled in 2020 due to COVID-19

== See also ==
- Palio di Siena
