= Contrade of Siena =

District within the Italian countryside

A contrada (plural: contrade) is generally a district within the Italian countryside. In the city of Siena, the term indicates the 17 urban wards, whose representatives race on horseback in the Palio di Siena, run twice every year in July and August. Each Sienese contrada is named after an animal or symbol, with a long history and complicated heraldic and semi-mythological associations.

== History ==
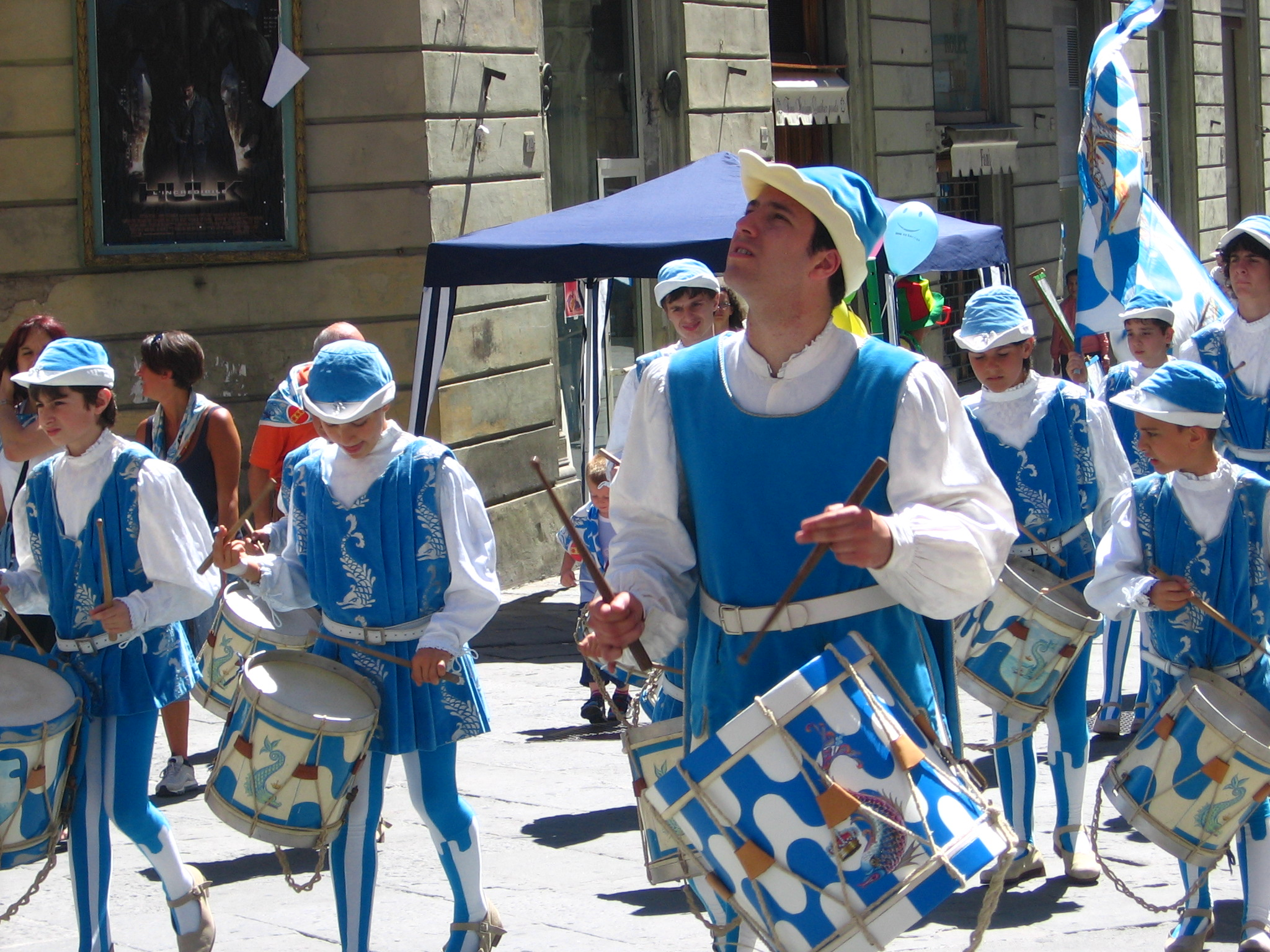
In the summer, as excitement for the Palio builds, it is customary for members of the various contrade to dress in ceremonial garb and parade through the city in the Corteo Storico.

The contrade districts were set up in the Middle Ages in order to supply troops to the many military companies that were hired to defend Siena as it fought to preserve its independence from Florence and other nearby city states. With the passage of time, however, the contrade have lost their administrative and military functions and have become areas of localised patriotism. The communities are held together by their histories, and the emotions and sense of civic pride of the residents. Their roles have broadened so that in the 21st century, every important event – baptisms, deaths, marriages, church holidays, victories at the Palio, even wine or food festivals – is celebrated only within one's own contrada. Siena's organization was definitively revised in 1730 by governor Violante Beatrice of Bavaria, as 17 intra-muros wards.

Every contrada (hood) has its own museum, church, fountain and baptismal font, motto, allied contrada (only Oca and Lupa have no allies) and adversary contrada, typically a neighbor (only four, Bruco, Drago, Giraffa and Selva, have no declared adversaries).

== Siena contrade ==
=== Aquila (Eagle) ===
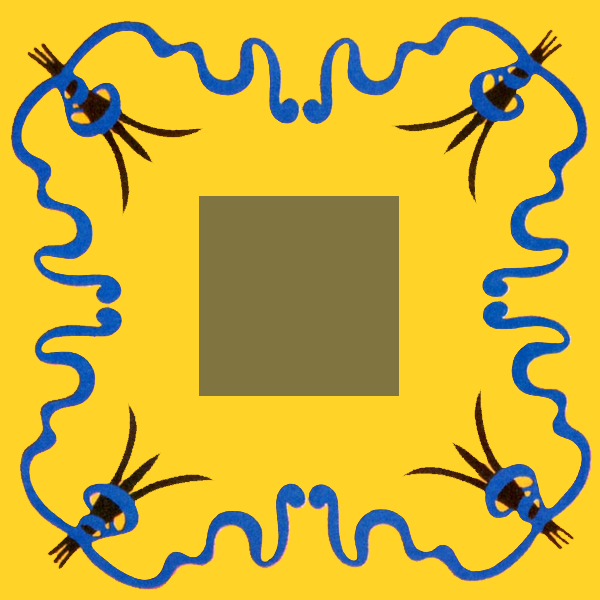
Aquila is situated immediately to the south-west of the Piazza del Campo in the centre of the city, and is home to the duomo (cathedral). Traditionally, its residents were notaries.

Their last victory was on July 3, 2026 (Giovanni Atzeni 'Tittia' on Diodoro). They have had 25 official victories.

Aquila's symbol is a double-headed black eagle holding an orb, a sword, and a sceptre. Its colours are yellow, trimmed with blue and black.

Aquila is one of only four nobile (noble) contrade; its title was bestowed by the Habsburg emperor Charles V, out of gratitude for the warm reception he received there in 1536.

The contrada's museum is home to the oldest surviving Palio di Siena banner (also called a palio), which dates from 1719.

Aquila's patron saint is La Vergine (the name of the Most Holy Maria). Her titulary festival is celebrated on 8 September.

They are allied to the Civetta (Owl) and Drago (Dragon) contrade. They have been opposed to the Pantera (Panther) contrada since 1947.

=== Bruco (Caterpillar) ===
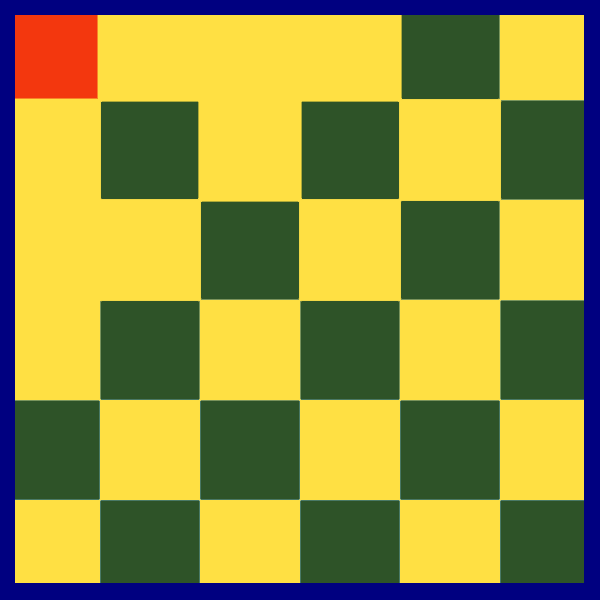
Bruco is situated to the north of the Piazza del Campo. Traditionally, its residents worked in the silk trade.

Bruco's symbol is a crowned caterpillar crawling on a rose. Its colours are green and yellow, trimmed with blue.

Bruco is one of the four nobile (noble) contrade; its title was earned in 1369 by its people's bravery in helping to defeat Charles IV, and consolidated in 1371 when they led the revolt to replace the Sienese council with a people's government.

Its Sede is at Via del Comune, 44.

Its patron Saint is the Madonna (Visitation of the Sainted Mary), and the Titulary feast is on 2 July.

Its motto is "Come rivoluzion sona il mio nome" (As revolution sounds my name).

It is allied to the Istrice, Nicchio and Torre contrade and not officially opposed to any other contrade. Its traditional animosity against neighbouring Giraffa (giraffe) ended, formally, in 1996.

Last victory- 16 August 2008. It has had 37 official victories.

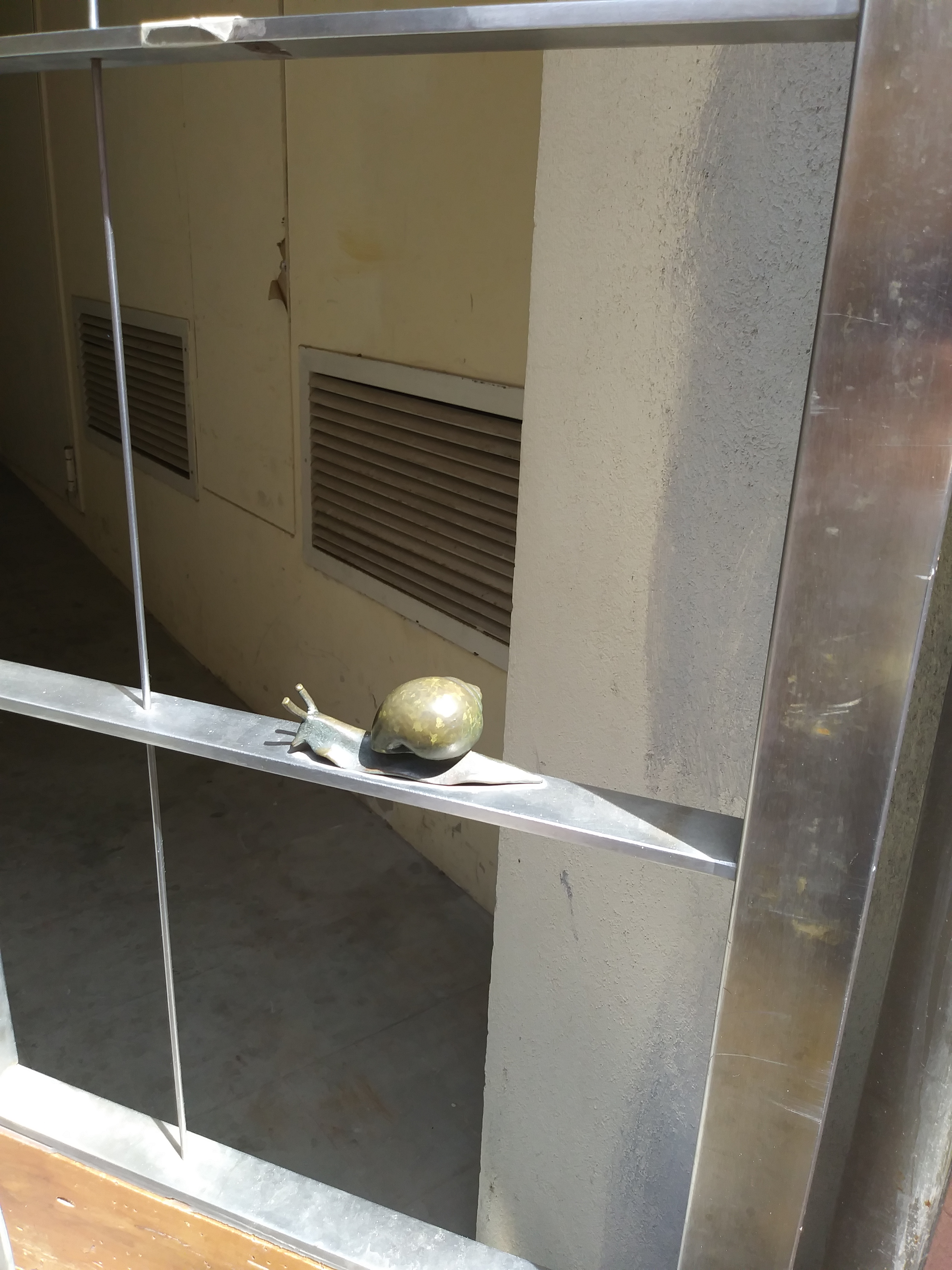
A snail decoration on a building in the Chiocciola contrada.

=== Chiocciola (Snail) ===
Chiocciola is situated in the south-western corner of the city; traditionally, its residents worked as terracotta makers. Chiocciola's motto is “With slow and deliberate steps, snail takes the field to triumph.” The district’s patron saints are the apostles Peter and Paul with a feast day of June 29.

Chiocciola's rival is Tartuca (Tortoise). Its allies are Istrice (Porcupine), Pantera (Panther) and Selva (Forest).

Their last Palio victory was on August 16, 1999. There is an expression in Siena, “The people of the Snail, drowners of saints.” In 1896, after losing a Palio, the contrada was so angry that they threw a statue of Saint Anthony (patron saint of horses) into a well. The statue wasn’t removed until 1910 and the district won in 1911. Its colours are red and yellow, trimmed with blue.

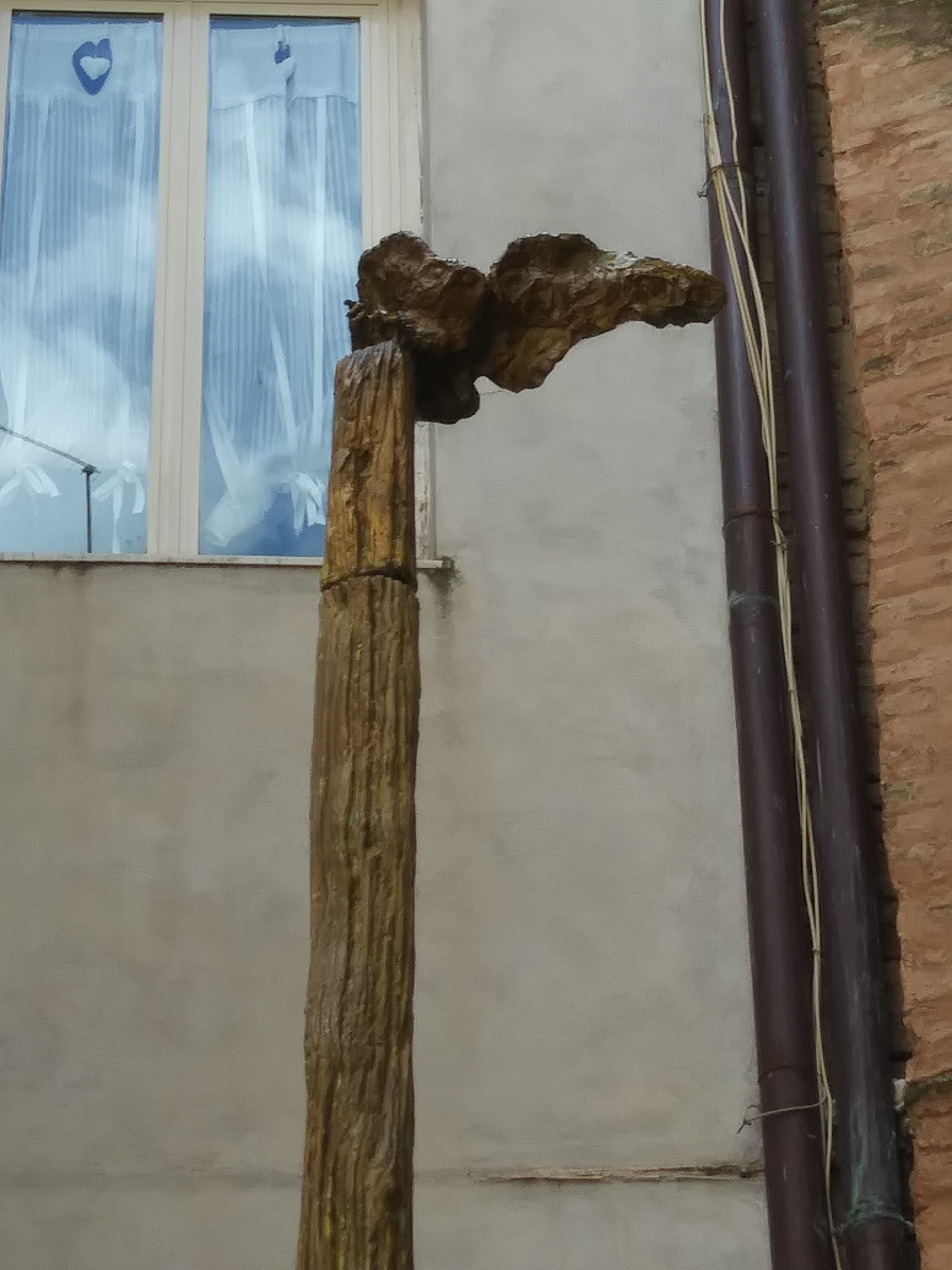
Fountain of the Civetta contrada, which is located outside of the contrada museum.

=== Civetta (Little Owl) ===
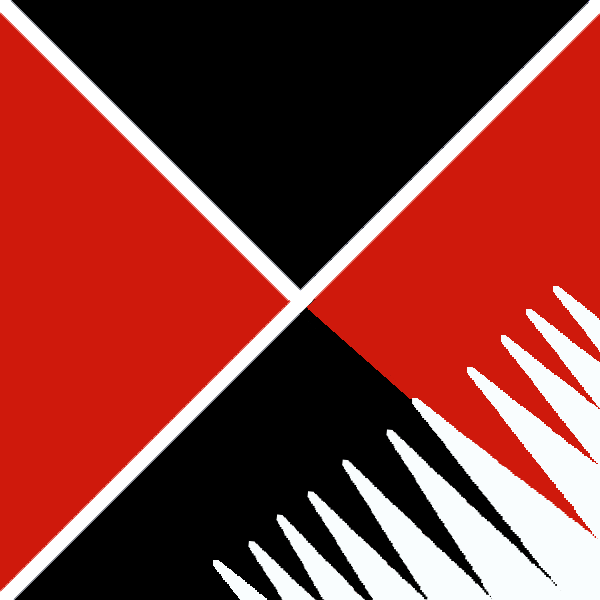
Civetta is situated immediately to the north of the Piazza del Campo in the centre of the city. Traditionally, its residents were shoemakers.

Civetta's symbol is a crowned owl sitting on a branch. Its colours are red and black striped with white. Its motto is: "Vedo nella Notte" (I see in the night).

For years Civetta was considered the nonna (grandmother) because it had not won a palio for over 30 years. Civetta won the Palio in August 2009, thereby losing the name "nonna".

In August 2014, Civetta once again won the palio. On September 19, 2014, members of the Civetta contrada held a street celebration in honor of their victory.

Civetta’s allies are Aquila, Giraffa, Istrice and Pantera. Its rival is Leocorno (since 1960).

=== Drago (Dragon) ===
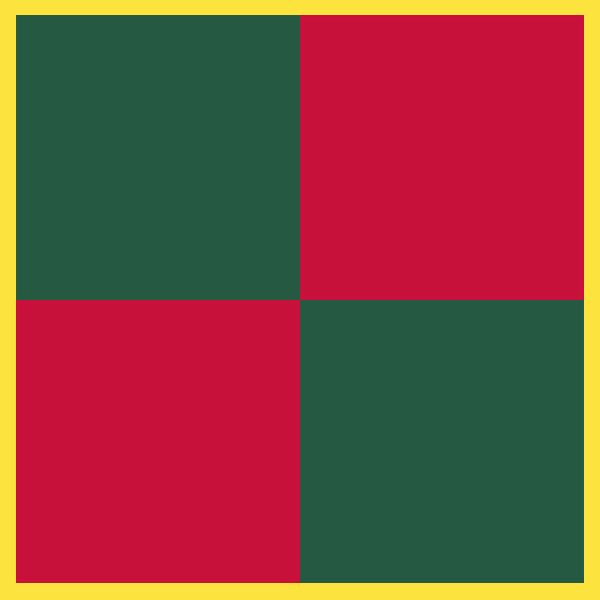
Drago is situated to the north-west of the Piazza del Campo. Traditionally, its residents were bankers.

Drago's symbol is a flying golden dragon carrying a banner with the letter "u". Its colours are pink and green, trimmed with yellow. Drago won the Palio on July 2, 2014, July 2, 2018, and again July 4, 2022.

Drago’s ally is Aquila. Drago has never had a rival Contrada.

=== Giraffa (Giraffe) ===
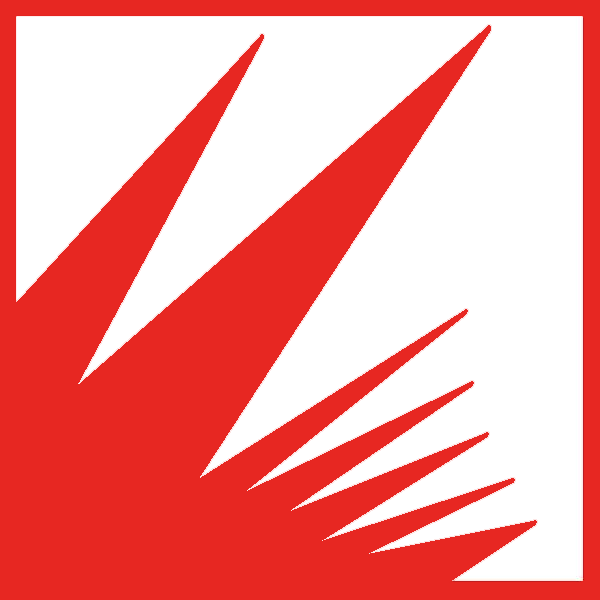
Giraffa is an affluent area of the city situated to the north-east of the [Piazza del Campo]. Traditionally, its residents were painters.

Giraffa's symbol is a giraffe led by a Moor, and a ribbon bearing the motto "Humbertus I dedit" (Umberto I gave it"). Its colours are white and red.

Giraffa has the title of contrada imperiale (imperial contrada). This title was bestowed on it by King Vittorio Emanuele III when it won the palio in 1936, the year the race was dedicated to Italy's empire in East Africa.

Giraffa won the Palio on 2nd of July, 2019.

Its allies are Civetta, Istrice and Pantera. It currently does not have an enemy, as its rivalry with Bruco ended in 1996.

=== Istrice (Crested Porcupine) ===
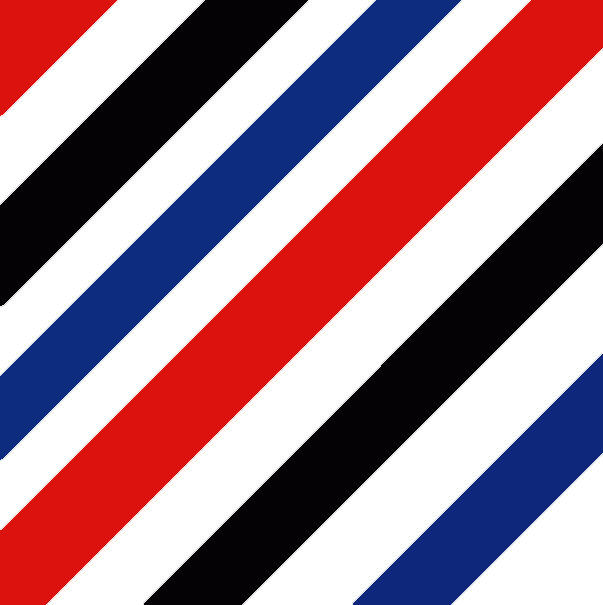
Istrice occupies the north-westernmost edge of Siena and contains the San Vincenzo e Anastasio church, home of the city's oldest surviving fresco and burial place of Pinturicchio. Traditionally, its residents were blacksmiths.

Istrice's symbol is a porcupine. Its colours are white, red, blue and black. Istrice’s adversary Contrada is the "Lupa" (She-wolf), since 1934. Allied Contradas are "Bruco", "Chiocciola", "Civetta" and "Giraffa".

Its motto is: "Sol per difesa io pungo" (I prick only for self-defense).

Istrice has the title of Contrada Sovrana (Sovereign Contrada). It was bestowed this title by the Sovereign Military Order of Malta as a result of it headquartering the order during the 14th century. The Templars Mansion is located in its territory in Via Malta.

Istrice last won the Palio in July 2008.

=== Leocorno (Unicorn) ===
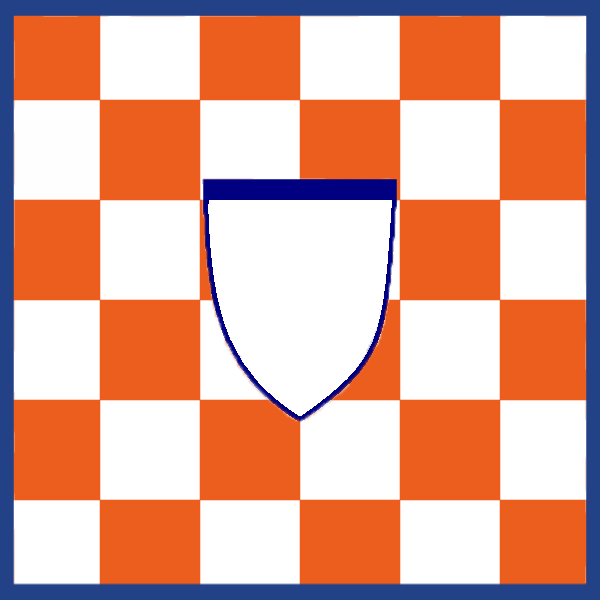
Leocorno is situated to the east of the Piazza del Campo. Traditionally, its residents were goldsmiths.

Leocorno's symbol is a unicorn forcené with the motto "Humberti regio gratia" ("A kingdom by the grace of Umberto"). Its colours are orange and white, bordered with blue.

Leocorno won the Palio of August 17, 2022, 15 years after its last win on August 16, 2007.

Leocorno’s allies are Pantera and Tartuca. Its rival is Civetta (since 1960).

=== Lupa (She-Wolf) ===
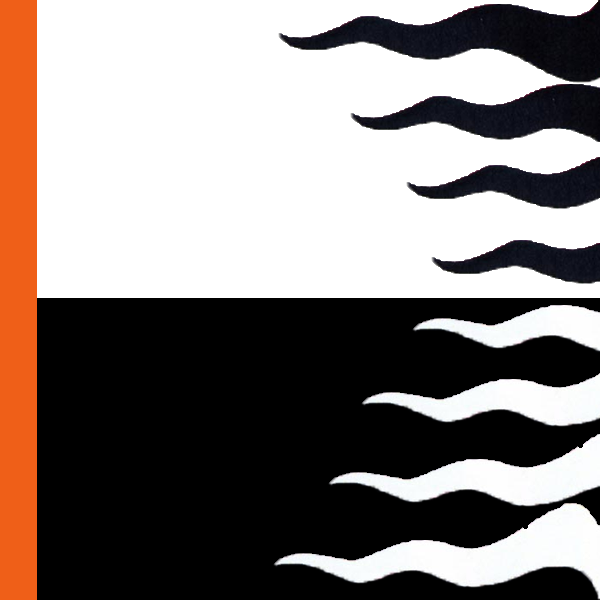
Lupa is situated to the north of the Piazza del Campo. Traditionally, the residents of Lupa were bakers.

Lupa's symbol is a female wolf nursing twins. Its colors are black and white, trimmed with orange. The she-wolf of this contrada refers to the legend that Siena was founded by Senius and Aschius, the sons of Remus, who were raised by a wolf. Because of this, Lupa's sister city is Rome.

The Lupa museum's prize exhibit is a photograph of Giuseppe Garibaldi, which he donated to the contrada on its victory in the Palio di Siena of 1867.

Lupa won the Palio of August 16, 2018.

Lupa has no allies; its rival is Istrice, since 1934.

=== Nicchio (Seashell) ===
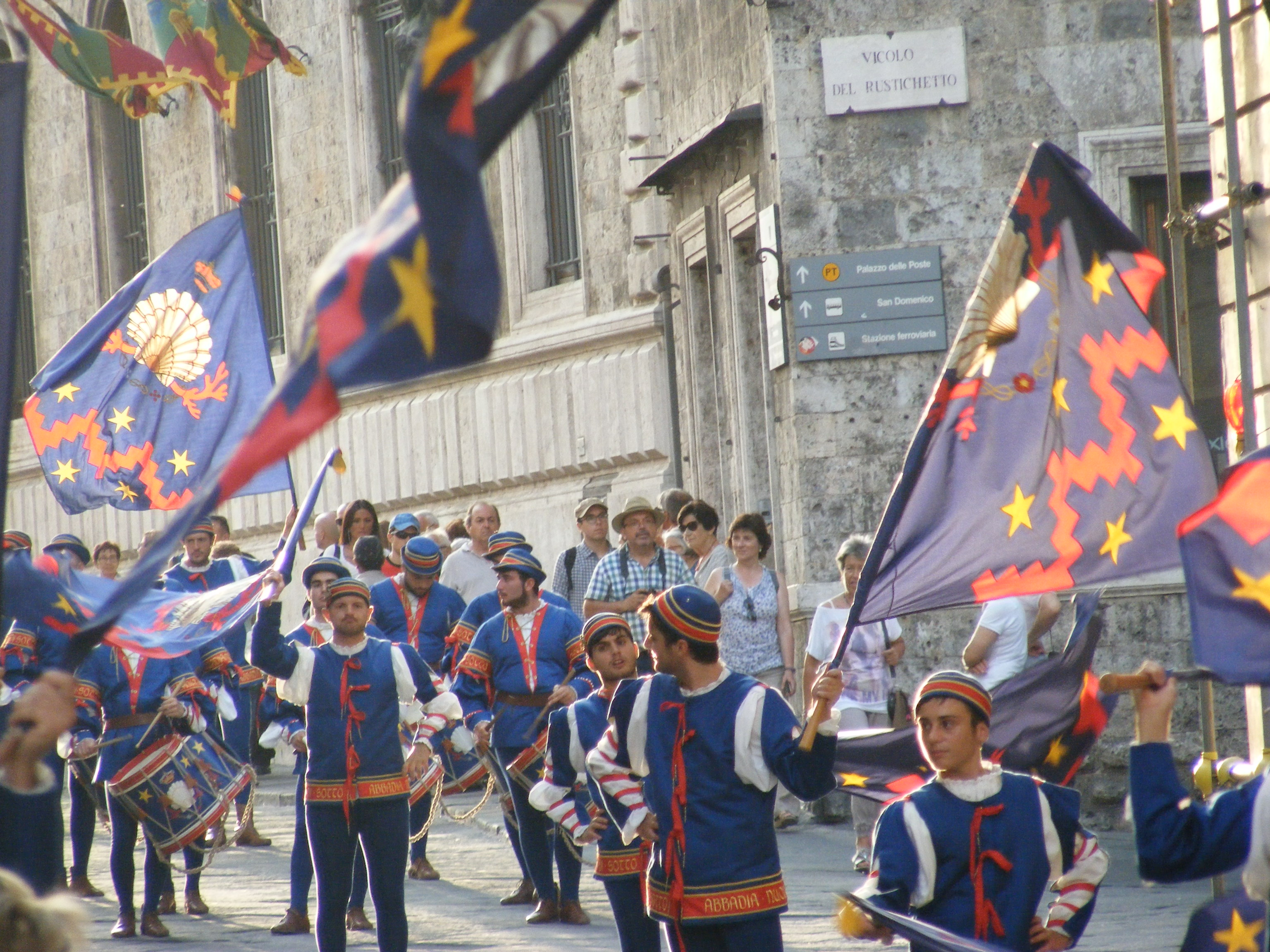
Parade of Nicchio contrada through the old town of Siena

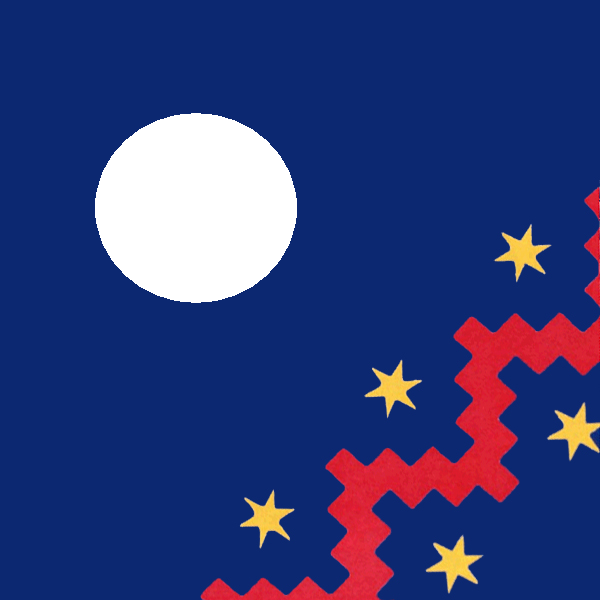
Nicchio is situated in the far eastern corner of the city. Traditionally, its residents worked as potters.

Nicchio's symbol is a crowned scallop shell flanked by two branches of coral. Its colours are blue, with yellow and red trim.

Nicchio is one of only four nobile (noble) contrade; it earned its title for bravery shown during the Battle of Montaperti against Florence in 1260, when its soldiers led the attack.

Nicchio’s allies are Bruco, Onda and Tartuca. Its rival is Valdimontone (since 1952).

=== Oca (Goose) ===
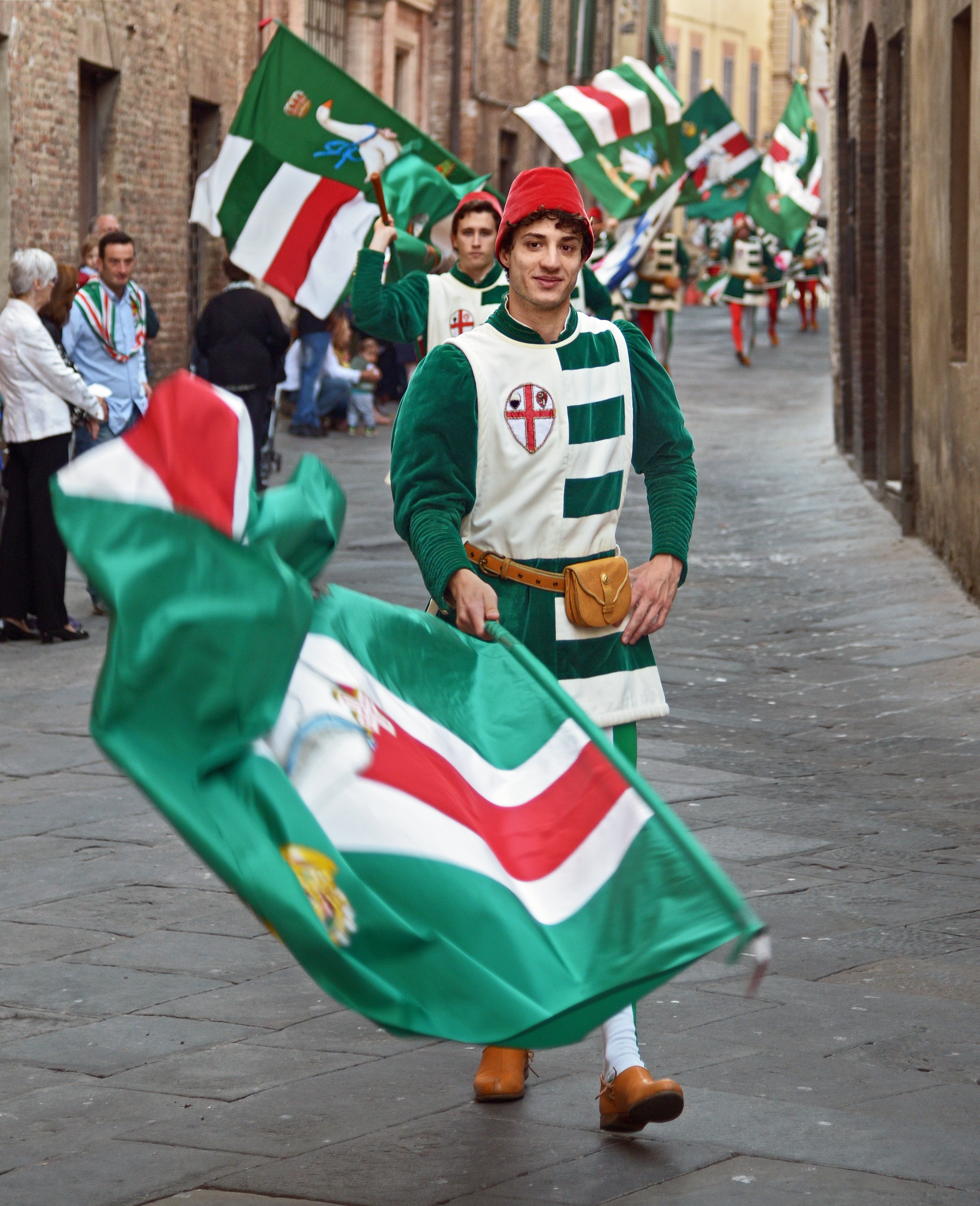
The procession of the Noble Contrada "Oca"

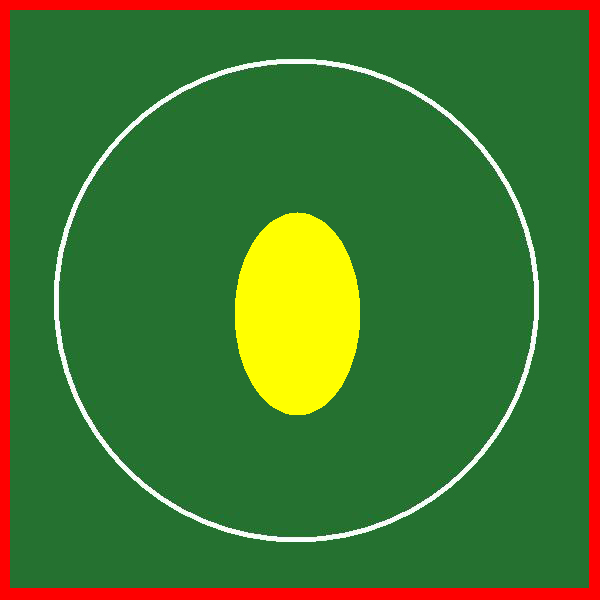
Oca is situated just to the west of the Piazza del Campo. Traditionally, its residents made dyes.

Oca's symbol is a crowned goose wearing around its neck a blue ribbon marked with the cross of Savoy. Its colours are green and white, with red trim.

Oca is one of only four nobile (noble) contrade; it earned its title for its people's bravery during many battles fought by the former Sienese Republic.

The most recent palio win for Oca was in the July 2, 2025 race. The previous win occurred on August 16, 2023, with jockey Carlo Sanna riding Zio Frac.

Oca has no allies. Its adversary is Torre, since 1671.

=== Onda (Wave) ===
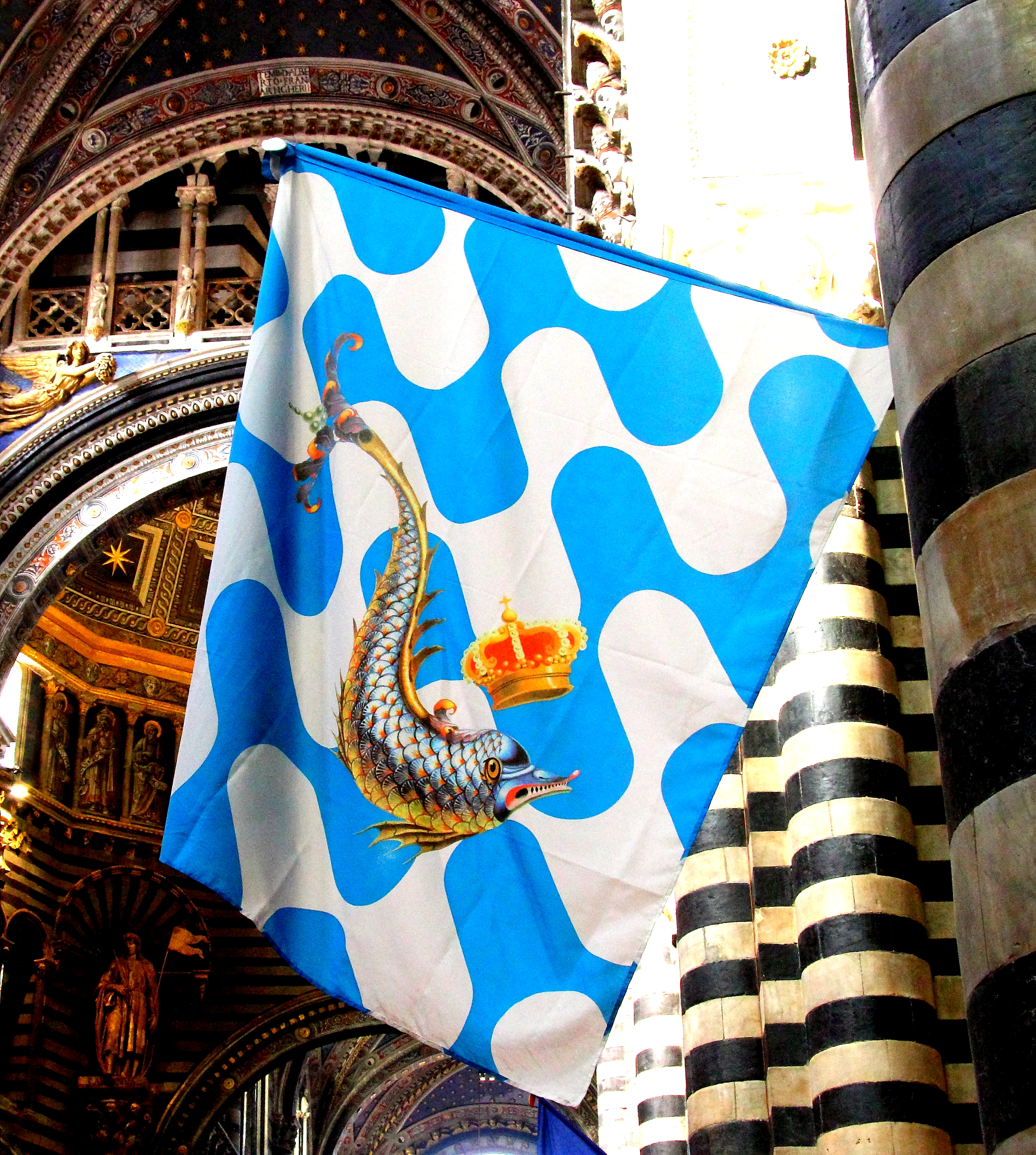
Flag of Onda contrada hanging in the cathedral of Siena

Onda runs south from the Piazza del Campo in the centre of the city. Traditionally, its residents were carpenters.

Onda's symbol is a dolphin. Its colours are white and sky blue and the contrada describes itself as "The colour of Heaven, the force of the sea."

Onda has the title of contrada capitana (captain contrada) because in the past its soldiers mounted guard at the Palazzo Pubblico. A famous member of Onda was the sculptor Giovanni Duprè, after whom the main street in Onda is named.

Onda is the only contrada to extend its domain outside the wall ring of the city. In fact one of historical duties of the contrada was to provide to Siena the soldiers to patrol the harbour village of Talamone, now in the Province of Grosseto, that was the sea harbour of the Republic of Siena during the Middle Age. For this reason Talamone is considered part of the contrada and their residents can join the life and institutions of the contrada, provided they are active funders.

Onda’s allies are Nicchio (since 1684), Tartuca (since 1933) and Valdimontone (since 1781). Onda's adversary is Torre (since 1559).

Onda won the Palio of July 2, 2012, August 16, 2013 and 2017, and July 4, 2024.

=== Pantera (Panther) ===
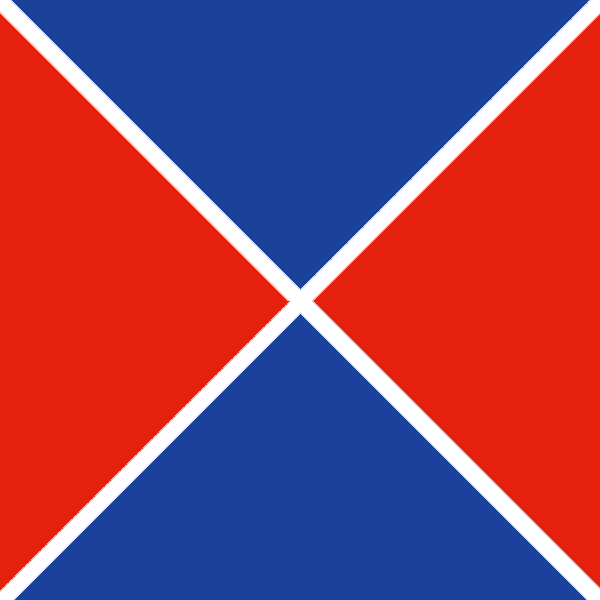
Pantera is situated at the western edge of the city. Traditionally, its residents were grocers, chemists and Steamers.

Pantera's symbol is a rampant panther. Its colours are red, blue and white.

Pantera’s allies are Chiocciola, Civetta, Giraffa and Istrice. Its rival is Aquila.

=== Selva (Forest) ===
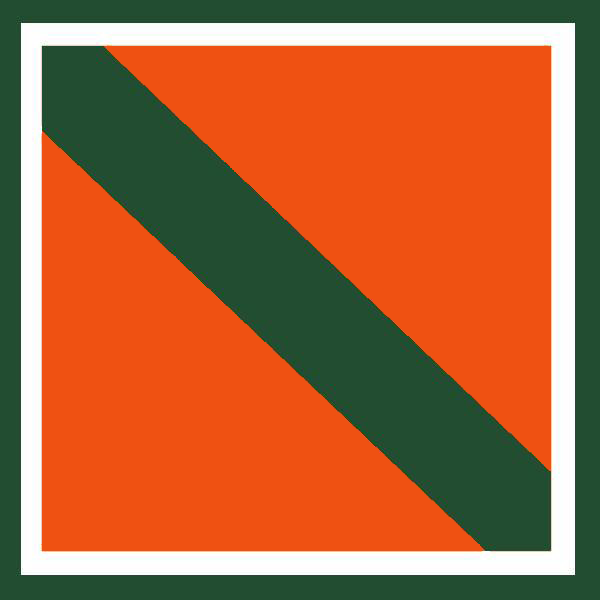
Selva runs west from the Piazza del Campo in the centre of the city. Traditionally, its residents were weavers, but when the contrade were mainly military, they had a reputation for being excellent archers.

Selva's symbol is a rhinoceros at the base of an oak tree hung with hunting tools. Its colors are green and orange, bordered with white.

It was the winner of the Palio on August 16, 2006, with Salasso on Caro Amico. It also won the Palio on July 2, 2010, a huge upset over Nicchio, who was favored to win. Selva's most recent victory was on July 2, 2023.

Its allies are Chiocciola and Tartuca. Selva does not have a rival.

=== Tartuca (Tortoise) ===
Tartuca is situated at the southern end of the city. Traditionally, its residents were sculptors.

Tartuca's symbol is a tortoise with alternating Savoy knots and daisies. Its colours are yellow and deep blue.

Winner of the Palio, on July 2, 2009, with Giuseppe Zedde on Già del Menhir. Tartuca last won the Palio on 20 October 2018.

It is opposed to Chiocciola, while its allies are Leocorno, Nicchio, Onda and Selva.

=== Torre (Tower) ===
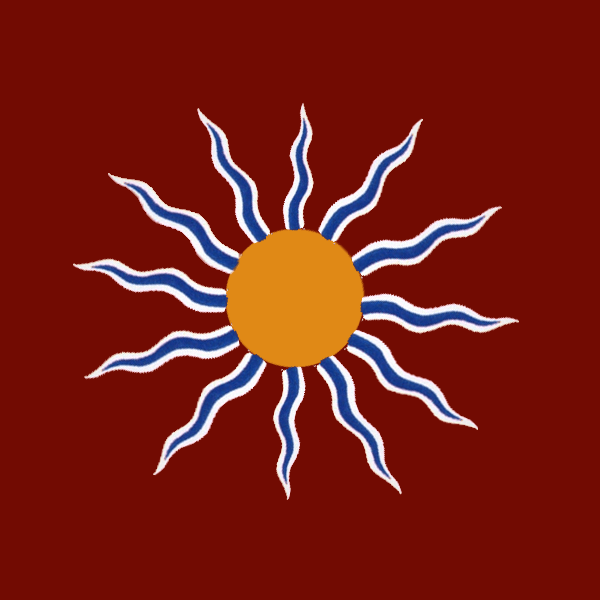
Torre is situated just to the south-east of the Piazza del Campo in the centre of the city, and encompasses Siena's Jewish quarter and synagogue. Traditionally, its residents worked as woolcombers.

Torre's symbol is an elephant (the contrada's original name was Liofante or Lionfante) with a tower on its back. Its colours are crimson, striped with white and blue.

Torre is the adversary of both Onda (wave) and of Oca (goose). It is the only contrada to have two rivalries, making it the most contentious contrada in Siena. Torre’s unique ally is Bruco.

They most recently won the palio on 2 July 2015.

=== Valdimontone (Valley of the Ram) ===
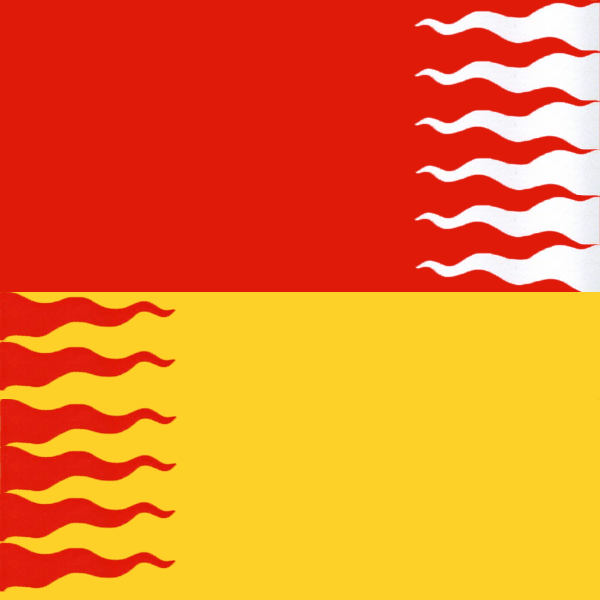

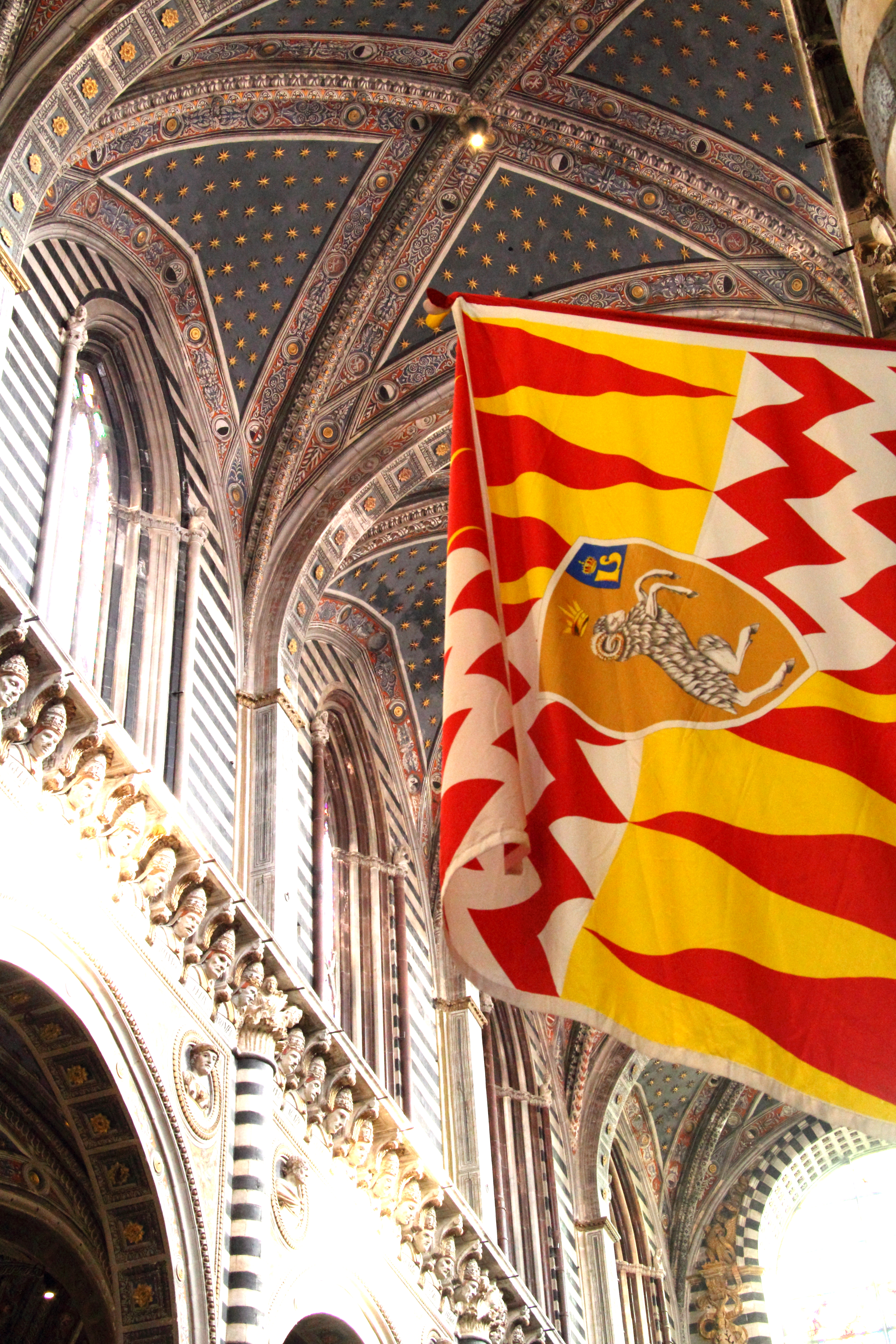
Flag of Valdimontone hanging in the Siena cathedral

Valdimontone is situated in the south-east of the city near Porta Romana. Traditionally, its residents were tailors.

Valdimontone's symbol is a crowned rampant ram, with a blue shield emblazoned with the letter "u" for Umberto. Its colours are red and yellow, with white trim.

It is allied with Onda and opposed to Nicchio, its neighbour.

Valdimontone last won the Palio on 16 August 2025.

== Abolished contrade ==
Originally 59 contrade were established, taking on functions like a clan in a tribal society. Consolidation over the centuries as needs changed has resulted in the number being reduced to 17 in the early 21st century. During the seventeenth century, some contrade were slowly dying out before their abolition, which took place officially in 1729. These districts were Gallo (Rooster), Leone (Lion), Orso (Bear), Quercia (Oak), Spadaforte (Strong Sword), and Vipera (Viper).

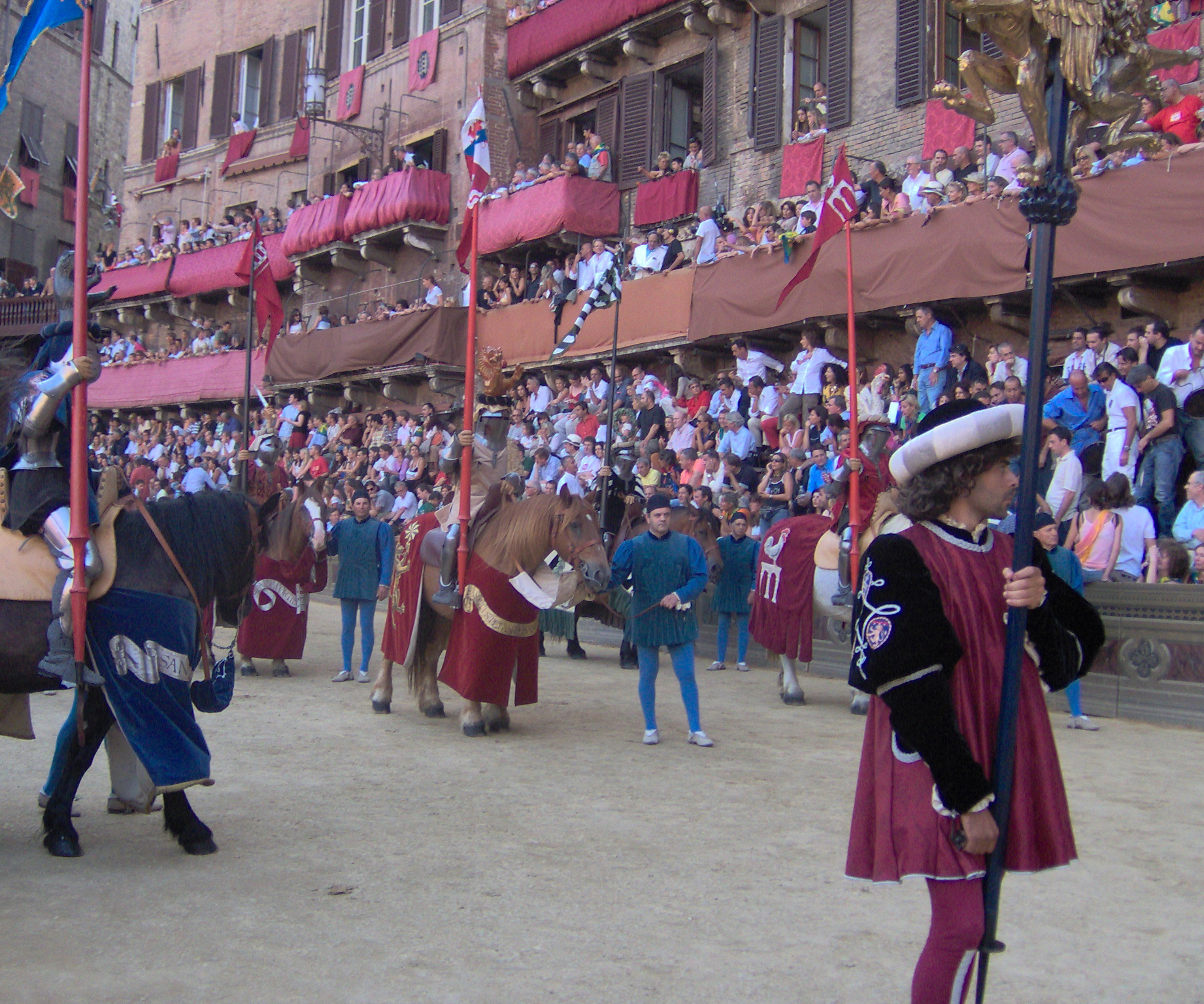
The Corteo Storico Parade for the memory of the Abolished Contrade

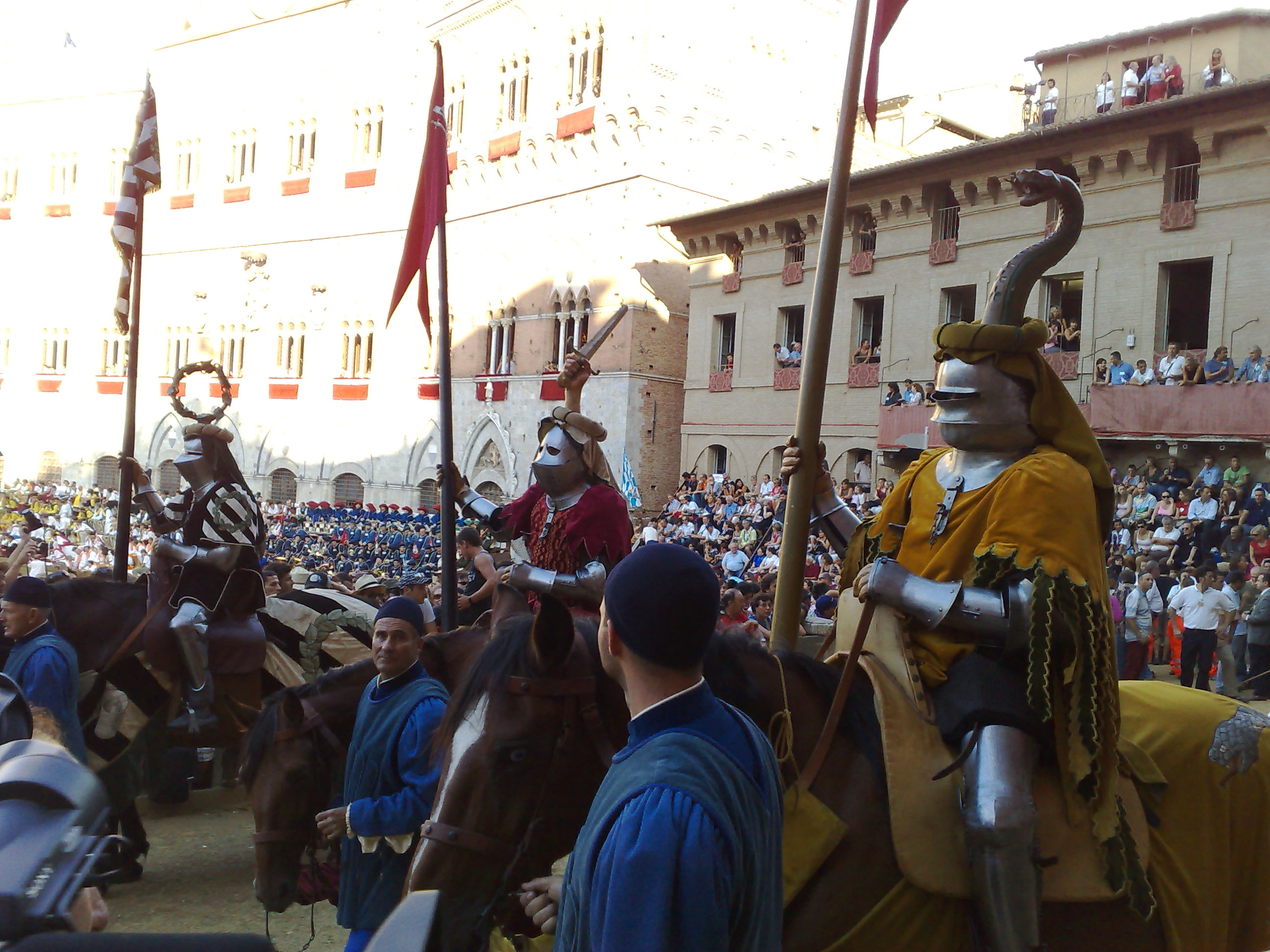
The representatives of Oak, Spadaforte and Viper parade in the Corteo Storico

The abolition of six quarters has always been surrounded by uncertainty. The deletion is traditionally traced to disorders related to the Palio of 1675. Some sources say that Contrada Spadaforte (with support of five other Contrade), despite the victory of Lupa, claimed the victory for itself. According to others, Spadaforte was forbidden to compete in the Palio, it can not rely on its actual influence area. The six "rebel" districts were therefore deleted.

This tradition is not supported by contemporary records. The abolition came about because of poor organization among the contrade and their lack of participation in the larger public life of the city. This is discussed in the book of Balia.

The six quarters were officially abolished by the edict issued by Violante Beatrice of Bavaria (known as Notice of Violante of Bavaria) in 1729. It defined the boundaries of the New Division of Contrade, which are still valid.

The six were incorporated into other contrade as follows;

- Gallo was incorporated into Civetta, Oca, and Selva.
- Leone was incorporated into Istrice.
- Orso was incorporated into Civetta.
- Quercia was incorporated into Chiocciola.
- Spadaforte was incorporated into Leocorno and Torre.
- Vipera was incorporated into Torre.

Today the six abolished contrade are remembered in the historical procession preceding the Palio di Siena: six riders with their helmets lowered, accompanied by a groom, parade in the ninth group of the Corteo Storico Historical Parade.

== See also ==
- Contrade of Legnano
- Palio di Siena
