= Palio di Siena =

Horse race held twice each year in Siena, Italy

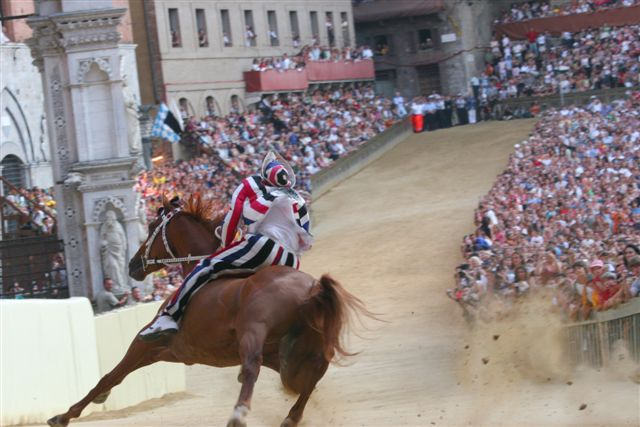
- Horse and jockey (fantino) turning a bend of the race course at Piazza del Campo
- Status: Active
- Genre: Historical horse race
- Dates: 2 July and 16 August
- Begins: July
- Ends: August
- Frequency: Annually (twice)
- Locations: Piazza del Campo, Siena
- Coordinates: 43°19′06″N 11°19′53″E
- Country: Italy
- Inaugurated: 17th century Palio "alla tonda" 1633; 393 years ago
- Most recent: 18 August 2026
- Next event: 2 July 2027
- Participants: Contrade of Siena
- Organiser: Comune di Siena
- Website: Palio di Siena

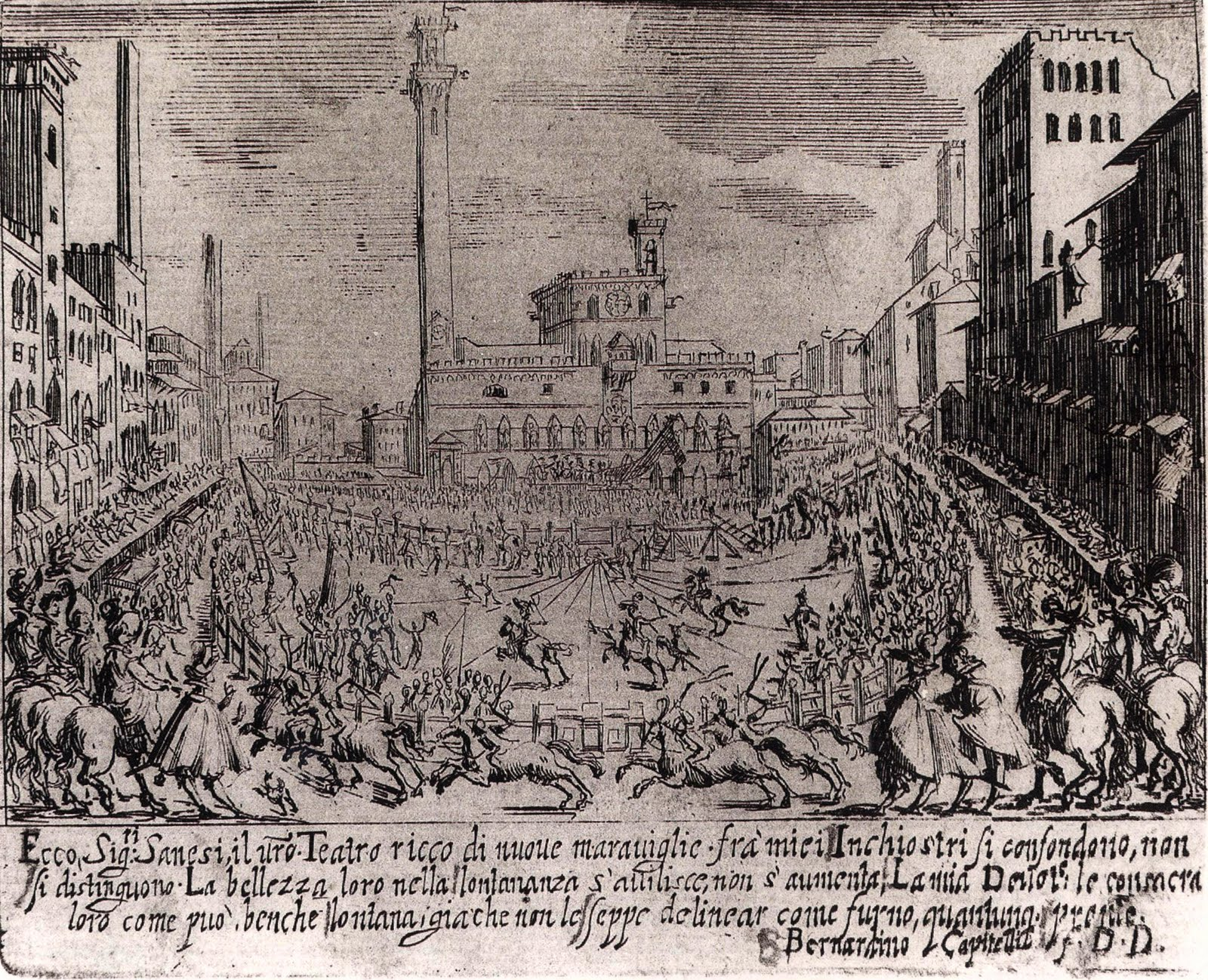
Palio alla tonda, 1633, by Bernardino Capitelli

The Palio di Siena (pronounced [ˈpaːljo di ˈsjɛːna]; known locally simply as Il Palio; from Latin pallium) is a horse race held twice each year, on 2 July and 16 August, in Siena, Italy. Ten horses and riders, bareback and dressed in the appropriate colours, represent ten of the seventeen contrade, or city wards, in a tradition dating back to the 17th century. The Palio held on 2 July is named Palio di Provenzano, in honour of the Madonna of Provenzano, a Marian devotion particular to Siena which developed around an icon from the Terzo Camollia area of the city. The Palio held on 16 August is named Palio dell'Assunta, in honour of the Assumption of Mary.

Of seventeen wards, or contrade, in the comune of Siena, only ten compete in each Palio. The seven contrade that did not take part in that month of the previous year are automatically included; three more are chosen by draw. The Corteo Storico, a pageant to the sound of the March of the Palio, precedes the race, which attracts visitors and spectators from around the world.

The race itself, in which the jockeys ride bareback, circles the Piazza del Campo, on which a thick layer of earth has been laid. The race is run for three laps of the piazza and usually lasts no more than 90 seconds. It is common for a few of the jockeys to be thrown off their horses while making the treacherous turns in the piazza, and indeed, it is not unusual to see riderless horses finishing the race. A horse is not required to have a rider to win the race.

The most recent winner of the Palio was Nicchio, the seashell, on August 18, 2026, with the rider Giovanni Atzeni known as Tittia and his horse, Anda e Bola. This was the first win for Nicchio since 1998.

== History ==
=== Origins ===
The earliest known antecedents of the race are medieval. The town's central piazza was the site of public games, largely combative: pugna, a sort of many-sided boxing match or brawl; jousting; and in the 16th century, bullfights. Public races organized by the contrade were popular from the 14th century onwards; called palio alla lunga, they were run across the whole city.

The race continued to develop over centuries. When the Grand Duke of Tuscany outlawed bullfighting in 1590, the contrade took to organizing races in the Piazza del Campo. The first such races were on buffalo-back and called bufalate; asinate, races on donkey-back, later took their place, while horse racing continued elsewhere. The first modern Palio (called palio alla tonda to distinguish it from the earlier palio alla lunga) took place in 1633. In 1729, the city's Munich-born governor, Violante of Bavaria, defined formal boundaries for the contrade, at the same time imposing several mergers so that the number of Sienese contrade was reduced to seventeen. This was also the year of the decree restricting the number of contrade that could participate in a Palio to ten; the restriction, which remains in force, resulted from the number and extent of accidents experienced in the preceding races.

=== Introduction of second annual race ===
At first, one race was held each year, on 2 July but a second race was added in 1701 on 16 August. Initially, the August race was run intermittently rather than every year. The August race, il palio dell'Assunta, coincided with the Feast of the Assumption, and was probably introduced spontaneously as part of the feasting and celebration associated with this important festival. The date 16 August was presumably chosen because the other days of the mid-August canonical festival, the 14th and 15th of the month, were already taken up respectively by the Procession of the Cross, Corteo dei Ceri, and by the census.

The August Palio started out as an extension of the celebrations of the July Palio and was organized and funded by July's winning contrada, though only if the contrada in question could afford it. After 1802, however, organisation and funding the August race became a central responsibility of the city, which removed annual uncertainty over whether or not an August Palio would run. It has been held at least since 15 August 1581 when 15 year old jockey Virginia Tacci was the first female to ride a steed in the race.

== Modern day race ==
The first race, Palio di Provenzano is held on 2 July, which is both the Feast of the Visitation and the date of a local festival in honour of the Madonna of Provenzano, a sculpture of the Virgin Mary once owned by the Sienese leader Provenzano Salvani, which was supposed to have miraculous curative power. The second race, Palio dell'Assunta, is held on 16 August, the day after the Feast of the Assumption. After exceptional events (e.g., the Apollo 11 Moon landing) and on important anniversaries (e.g., the centennial of the Unification of Italy), the Sienese community may decide to hold a third Palio between May and September. The most recent was in 2018 to celebrate the anniversary of the end of WWI.

=== Horse selection ===
Private owners, some jockeys, offer the pick of their stables, selected during the year after trial races, other Palio races in Italy and veterinary examination, from which main representatives of the participating contrade, the Capitani, choose ten of approximately equal quality, three days before the race. A lottery then determines which horse will run for each contrada. This lottery is held during the four days of the festival, to select which barbero (the term for racehorse in the city of Siena and Tuscany) will go to which contrada.

Corruption (bribery) is commonplace, prompting the residents of each contrada, known as contradaioli, to keep a close watch on their stable and their rider. The horses are of mixed breed; no purebred horses are allowed.

=== Contrada draw (estrazione) ===
In each race, only ten of the seventeen contrade participate: the seven which did not participate in the previous year's Palio and three others chosen by lottery. The lottery assigns jockeys from each contrada to the ten selected horses. Not every contrade will participate in the annual Palii. The draw, or estrazione, occurs at 7:30 PM on the last Sunday of May for the June race, and at the beginning of July for the August race. The draw consists of three trumpeters, known as chianire, who play from the windows of city hall. At the end of the trumpet song, the randomly drawn flags of the contrade selected for that race are displayed out of the windows.

=== Palio trials ===
Six trial races are run, the first on the evening of the horse selection and the last on the morning before the Palio, during which the riders have the opportunity to familiarize themselves with their horse and with the track itself. The trials, Prova, are held the evening of the horse lottery and twice daily for the next two days. Attended by many tourists and contrada members in square, barriers are mounted on the outside of the track making it difficult to move freely throughout the square.

The children of the contrade are assembled in bleachers to sing closest to city hall during the trials. During the race, the bleachers are reserved primarily for adults. Children are no longer allowed to stand in the middle of the piazza during the race, and can only view from a bleacher or window.

=== Race day ===
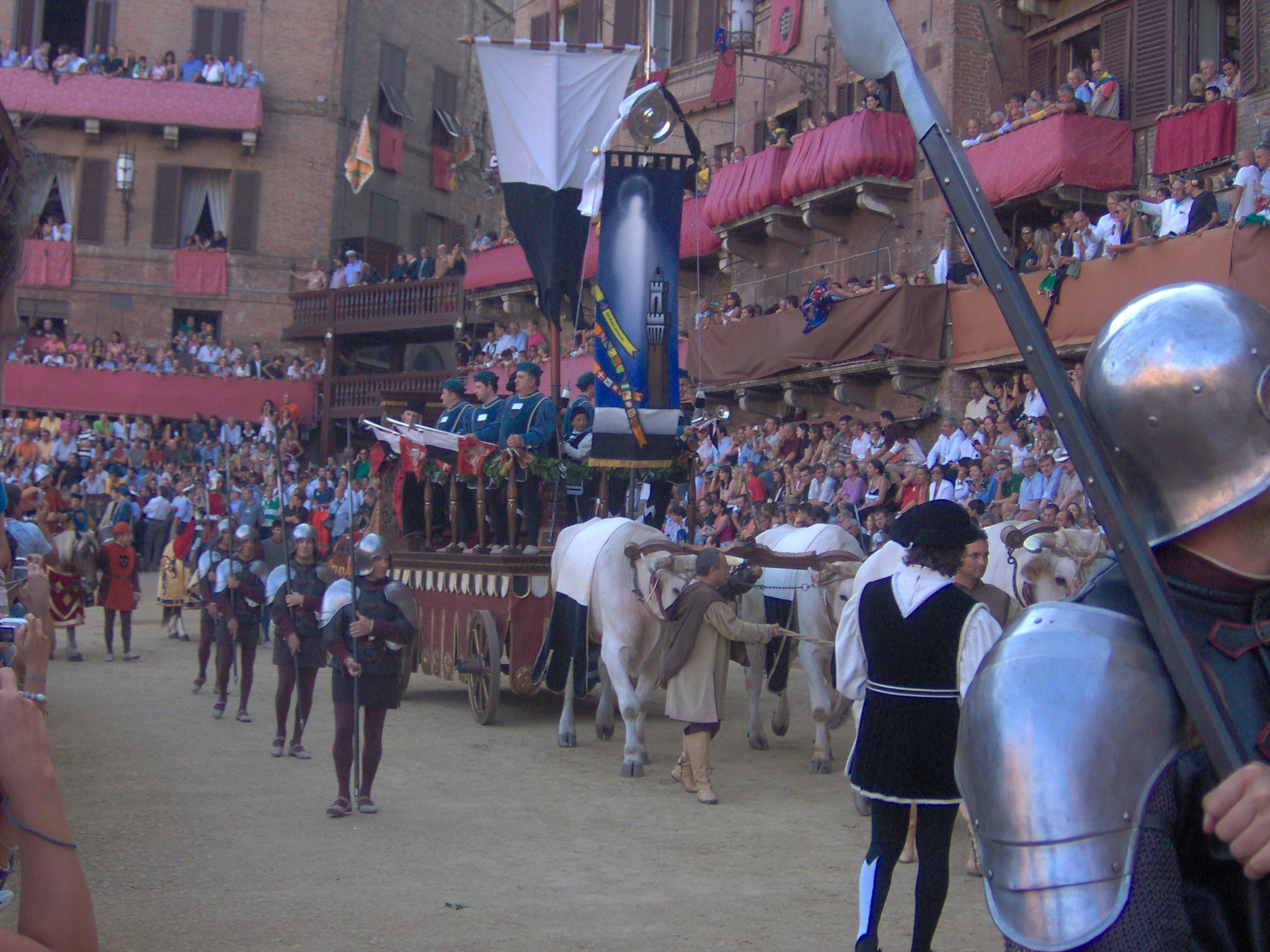
The carroccio of Siena during the Corteo Storico procession preceding the Palio of August 2006

The race is preceded by a spectacular pageant to the sound of the March of the Palio, the Corteo Storico, which includes flag wavers, or alfieri, in medieval costumes. Just before the pageant, a squad of carabinieri on horseback, wielding swords, demonstrate a mounted charge around the track. They take one lap at a walk, in formation, and a second at a gallop that foreshadows the excitement of the race to come, before exiting down one of the streets that leads out of Piazza del Campo. Spectators arrive early in the morning, eventually filling the centre of the town square, normally to capacity. The local police seal the entrances once festivities begin. Seats ranging from simple bleachers to elaborate box seats may be purchased before the event to watch the race.

At 7:30 p.m. for the July race, and 7 p.m. for the August race, the detonation of an explosive charge echoes across the piazza, signaling to the thousands of onlookers that the race is about to begin. The race itself runs for three laps of the Piazza del Campo, the perimeter of which is covered with several inches of dirt, imported and laid for the occasion at great expense to the cit, and the corners of which are protected with padded crash barriers for the occasion. The jockeys ride the horses bareback from the starting line, an area between two ropes. Nine horses, in an order only decided by lot immediately before the race starts, enter the space. The tenth, the rincorsa, waits outside. When the rincorsa finally enters the space between the ropes the starter (mossiere) activates a mechanism that instantly drops the canapo (the front rope). This process (the mossa) can take a very long time, as deals have usually been made between various contrade and jockeys that affect when the rincorsa moves—he may be waiting for a particular other horse to be well—or badly-placed, for example.

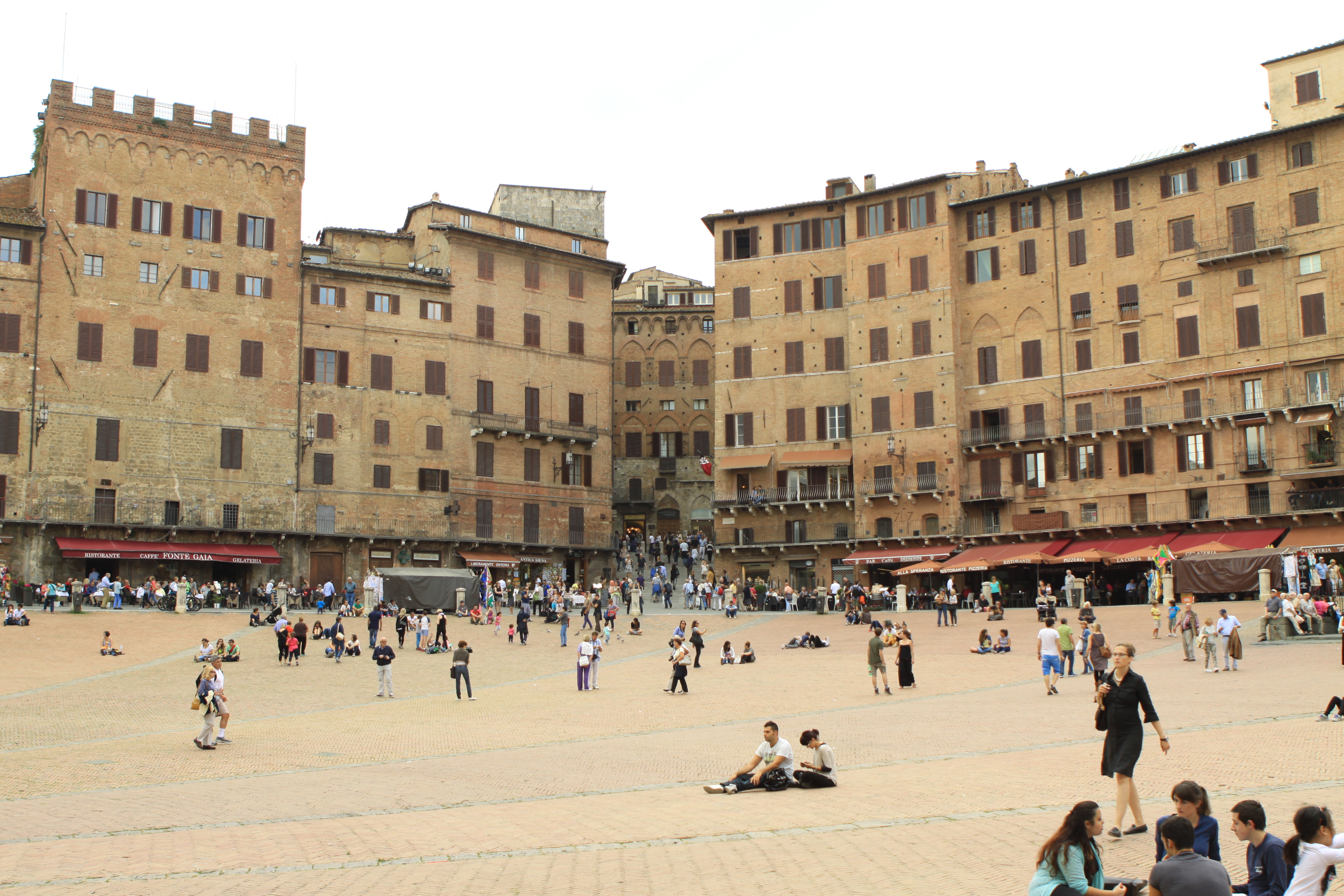
View of the Piazza del Campo, where the Palio is run

=== Racing conditions ===
The stone race track around the square is covered with a layer of dirt composed of a mixture of tuff, clay and sand.

The Palio differs from a typical horse races in that part of the game is for the wards to prevent rival contrade from winning. When a contrada fails to win, its historical enemy will celebrate that fact nearly as merrily as a victory of its own, regardless of whether adversarial interference was a deciding factor. Few things are forbidden to the jockeys during the race; for instance, they can pull or shove their fellows, hit the horses and each other, or try to hamper other horses at the start.

On the dangerous, steeply canted track, the riders are allowed to use their whips (in Italian, nerbi, stretched, dried bulls' hide) not only for their own horse, but also for disturbing other horses and riders.

There may be some danger to spectators from the sheer number of people in attendance. There have also been complaints about mistreatment of horses, injuries and even deaths, especially from animal-rights associations and even from some veterinarians. In the Palio held on 16 August 2004, the horse for the contrada of Bruco (the Caterpillar) fell and was badly trampled, as the race was not stopped despite possible additional safety risks for other horses. The horse died of its injuries, raising further complaints from animal rights organizations.

=== Victory ===
The Palio in fact is won by the horse who represents his contrada, and not by the jockeys. The winner is the first horse to cross the finish line—a horse can win without its rider. This phenomenom is known as cavallo scosso. A horse can also win without its decorative headgear, or spennacchiera, although the opposite belief is widely held even among the Sienese. The loser in the race is considered to be the contrada whose horse came second, not last.

The winner is awarded a banner of painted silk, or palio, which is hand-painted by a different artist for each race. The enthusiasm after the victory, however, is so extreme that the ceremony of attribution of the palio can be considered chaotic. There are occasional outbreaks of violence between partisans of rival contrade.

== Rituals and preparation ==
=== Annual event preparations ===
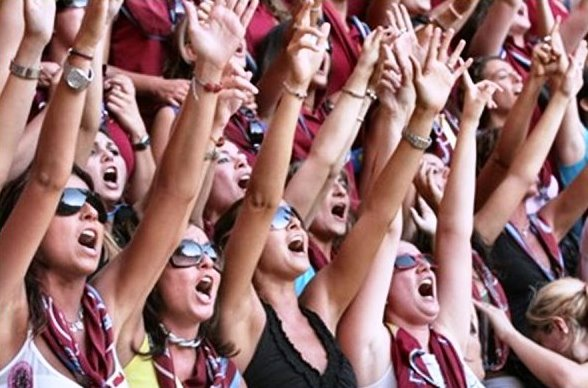
A typical image of the four-day party: groups of Contrada della Torre (Tower) on stage singing

Although many activities take place within each contrada, the organization of the Palio is the most important and largest in each year. In the lead up to the Palio, there is a four-day festival of events that take the entire year to plan. Beginning in winter, the contrada leaders talk and develop strategies, making contacts with the jockeys and horse owners. These leaders prepare those who will race in the Piazza del Campo or take part in minor Palios elsewhere in nearby towns (la cosiddetta provincia) and bring them to training courses organized by the city in the spring.

The full activities of the Palio start to grow in momentum towards the end of May, with the drawing of lots of the three remaining contrade that will join the seven that have won the right to race. With districts and teams outlined, contrade begin to talk about "deals" (engagement of jockeys) and "parties" (secret pacts for the win), despite not knowing which horse they will draw in the lot.

Among the events that mark the approach of the Palio are the rehearsal dinners, the "mass" of the jockeys and the blessing of the horse and jockey.

=== Rivalry ===
The Palio di Siena is more than a simple horse race, it is the culmination of ongoing rivalry and competition between the contrade. Each contrade undertakes formal and informal rituals before and during the day of the race, reflecting local pride. Each contrada has a unique strategy of horsemanship, alliances and animosities. There are the final clandestine meetings among the heads of the contrade and then between them and the jockeys. There is the two-hour pageant of the Corteo Storico, culminating in the race, which takes only about 75 seconds to complete.

The contrada that has been the longest without a victory is nicknamed nonna ('grandmother'). Civetta (the Owlet), which won the race of 16 August 2009, was the holder of this title, not having won the victory since 1979. Before that, Torre (the Tower) had this title for being without victory for 44 years (from 1961 to 2005), and Bruco (the Caterpillar) held the title for not winning over 41 years (from 1955 to 1996). The nonna was Lupa (the She-Wolf), which has not had a victory since 2 July 1989, a period of 36–37 years, until July 2016, when it finally won, leaving the nonna title to Aquila (the Eagle). In July 2026, Aquila won the Palio for the first time in thirty four years, relinquishing the title to Nicchio (the Seashell). Nicchio, which had not won the Palio in twenty-eight years, won the Palio one month later in August 2026, leaving the nonna title to Chiocciola (the Snail).

=== Palio (drappellone) ===
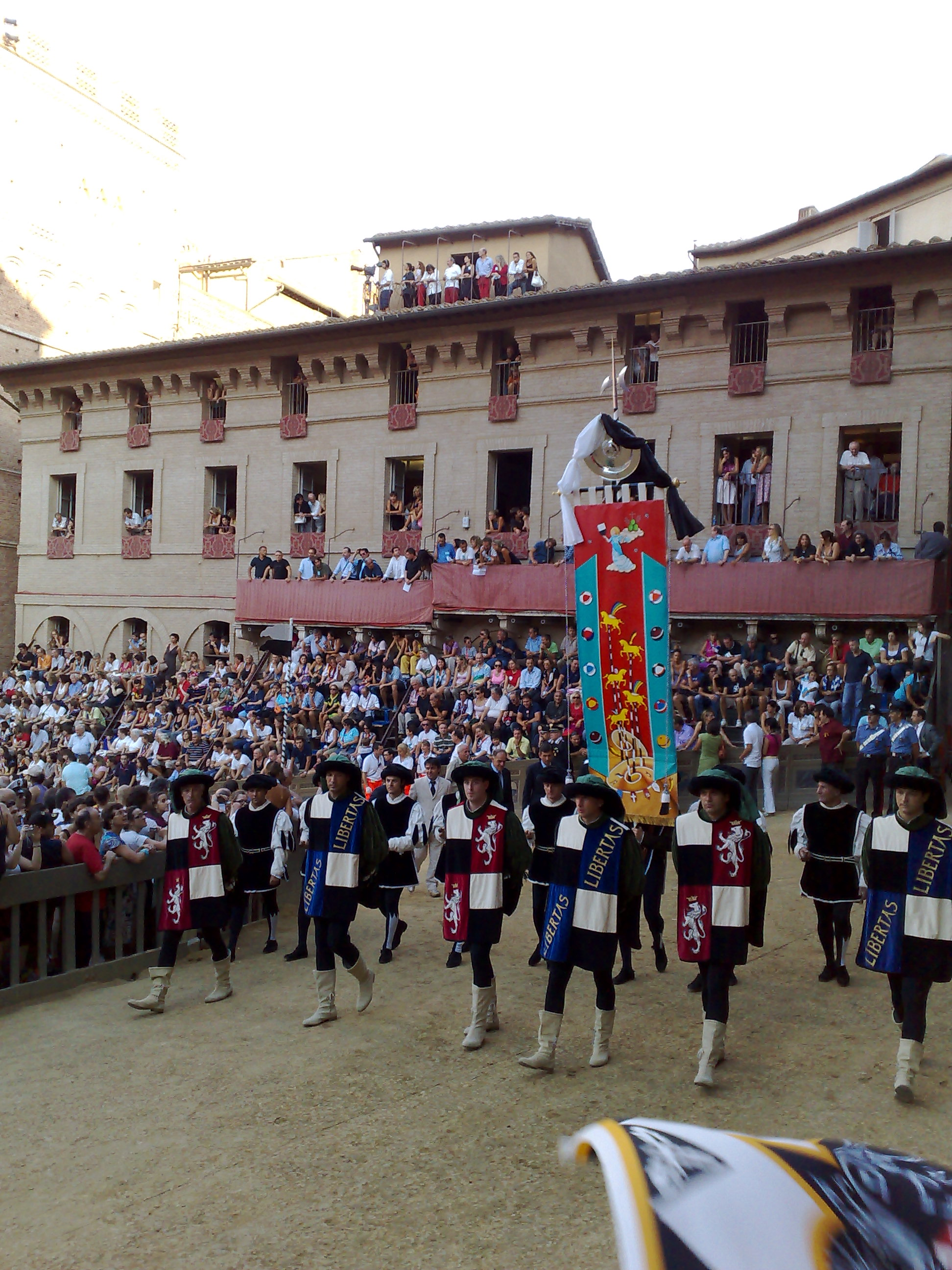
The drappellone banner of the Palio of 16 August 2009, painted by Giuliano Ghelli

The drappellone ('banner'), or palio, known affectionately as cencio ('the rag') in Siena, is the trophy that is to be delivered to the contrada that wins the Palio. About a week before the race, the palio (drappellone) itself is presented to the city, which is commissioned by a local artist for the July race, or internationally recognized artist for the August or a special race. The palio serves as the prize or trophy. Also at this time, visits occur to the horses which will be presented for the lottery.

The palio itself is an elongated rectangular piece of silk, hand-painted by an artist for the occasion. It is held vertically on a black-and-white shaft halberd and topped by a silver plate, with two white and black plumes draped down the sides.

The palio, along with the plumes, remains the property of the contrada. The plate is returned to the city of Siena before the two Palii of the following year, after the date and the name of the victorious contrada are inscribed on its back. There is one silver platter for the Palio in July and another for the August Palio. The plates are replaced approximately every ten years.

The value of the banner is unique, because it represents a particular historical period of the city of Siena. The palii often reflect the symbols of the various governments that have presided at various times, including the crest of the grand duchy of Lorraine, the crest of the Grand Dukes of Tuscany, the crest of the Kingdom of Sardinia, symbols from Fascist Italy, and most recently, imagery of the Republic.

The process that an artist should follow in designing the palio is rigid: it must follow a precise iconography that includes some sacred symbols, as the July Palio is dedicated to the Madonna of Provenzano, and that of August to the Madonna of the Assumption. It must present the insignia of the city, the heraldic shields of the Terzi (thirds) of the city, and the symbols or colors of the ten contrade participating in the race. There are, however, no limits regarding the style of the art. The palio is first presented at a press conference in the courtyard of the Podestà of the City Hall about a week before the race.

== Competitors (contrade) ==
=== Contrade ===
The most successful contrade is Oca, the Goose, which has won 64 races (at least according to their records, which start from 1644), followed by Chiocciola, the Snail, with 51, and Tartuca, the Tortoise, with 46. Oca is also the contrada with the most wins in recent history (from 1900 to 2010) with 21 victories, followed by Selva, the Forest, with 18, and Drago, the Dragon, with 17.

In recent history (from 1900 to the present), only three wards have succeeded in winning both the July and the August races in a single year (the term in Italian is fare cappotto) with the same jockey. Tartuca (the Tortoise) accomplished the feat in 1933 with jockey Fernando Leoni (nicknamed "Ganascia") on Folco. In 1997, Giraffa (the Giraffe) won both races, with jockey Giuseppe Pes, nicknamed Il Pesse. In 2016, jockey Jonatan Bartoletti, on the mount "Preziosa Penelope", won both the July and August races for Lupa (the She-wolf).

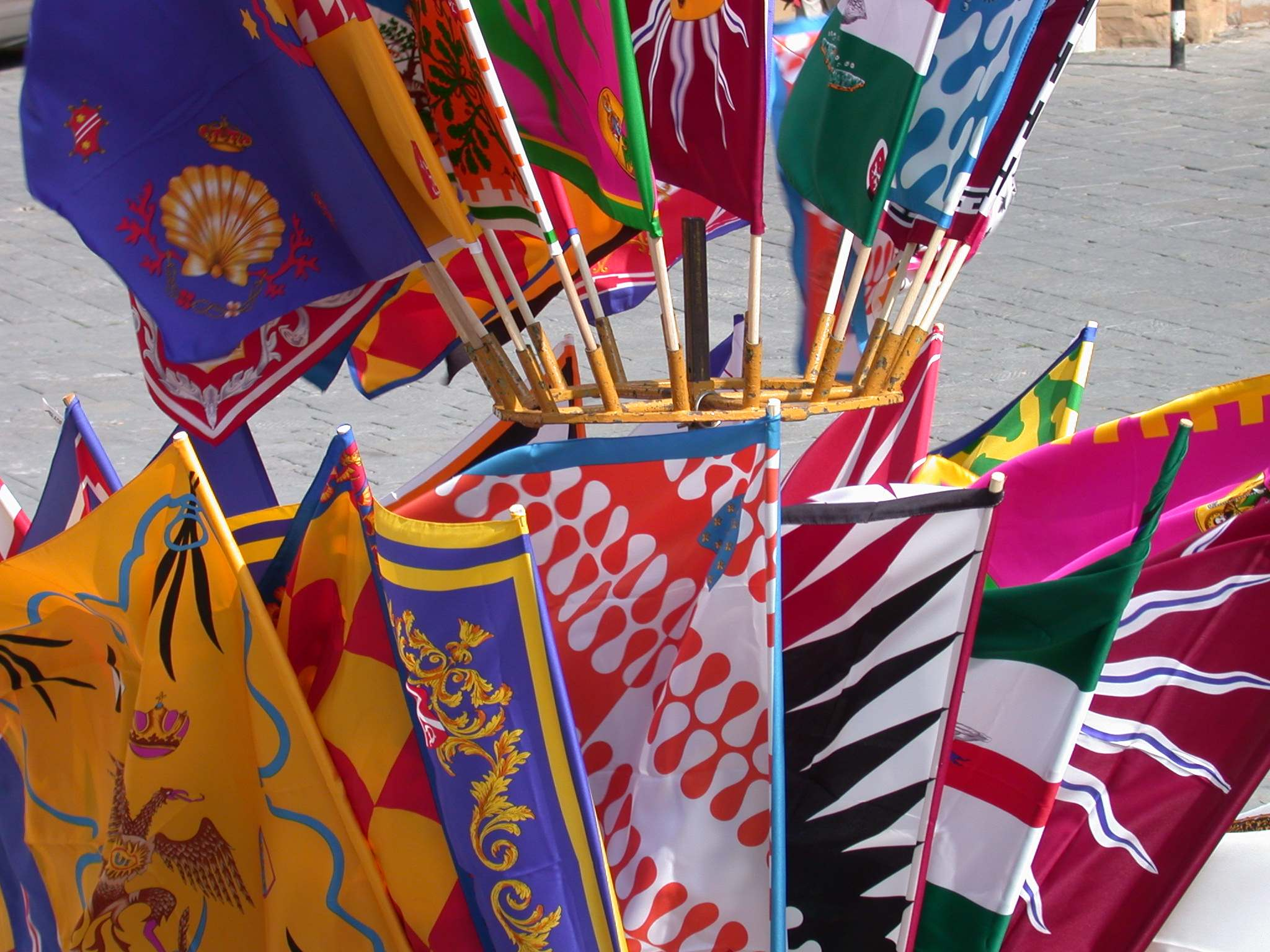
Banners of the city's contrade sold before the race (a contrada is a district, or a ward, within an Italian city)

The seventeen contrade are:

- Aquila (Eagle)
- Bruco (Caterpillar)
- Chiocciola (Snail)
- Civetta (Little Owl)
- Drago (Dragon)
- Giraffa (Giraffe)
- Istrice (Crested Porcupine)
- Leocorno (Unicorn)
- Lupa (She-Wolf)
- Nicchio (Seashell)
- Oca (Goose)
- Onda (Wave)
- Pantera (Panther)
- Selva (Forest)
- Tartuca (Tortoise)
- Torre (Tower)
- Valdimontone (Valley of the Ram) often shortened to Montone

=== Victories per contrada ===
Contrada	Total Victories	17th century	18th century	19th century	20th century	21st century	Date of last victory	Time since last victory
Aquila	25	0	7	6	11	1	3 July 2026	124 days
Bruco	37	6	7	16	5	3	16 August 2008	18 years, 80 days
Chiocciola	51	4	19	14	14	0	16 August 1999	27 years, 80 days
Civetta	33	2	7	15	8	3	16 August 2014	12 years, 80 days
Drago	39	2	8	10	15	4	2 July 2022	4 years, 125 days
Giraffa	36	3	5	9	15	3	2 July 2019	7 years, 125 days
Istrice	41	4	11	14	10	2	2 July 2008	18 years, 125 days
Leocorno	31	3	3	11	11	4	17 August 2022	4 years, 79 days
Lupa	38	1	11	11	11	4	17 August 2024	2 years, 79 days
Nicchio	42	5	10	12	15	1	18 August 2026	78 days
Oca	67	8	14	20	20	5	3 July 2025	1 year, 124 days
Onda	41½	4	9½	14	11	4	4 July 2024	2 years, 123 days
Pantera	26	3	6	7	9	1	2 July 2006	20 years, 125 days
Selva	39	2	11	6	14	6	2 July 2023	3 years, 125 days
Tartuca	48½	4	11½	16	12	5	20 October 2018	8 years, 15 days
Torre	45	6	12	20	5	2	2 July 2015	11 years, 125 days
Valdimontone	44	2	16	10	15	1	16 August 2025	1 year, 80 days

=== Jockeys ===
Among jockeys, the most victorious of all time is Andrea Degortes, nicknamed Aceto ('Vinegar'), with 14 wins (from 1964 to 1996). Angelo Meloni, nicknamed Picino (active from 1897 to 1933) has the second in the number of wins with 13 successes, and Luigi Bruschelli, nicknamed Trecciolino (still active), has the third most of 12 wins (although he claims 13 victories, his horse won without him one year).

The most successful horses were Folco and Panezio with eight wins each, followed by Topolone with seven.

== Notable races ==
An extraordinary Palio is a third Palio which may take place during the period between May and September and is associated with events or anniversaries of major importance for the community of Siena. The most recent extraordinary Palio was held in 2018. An extraordinary Palio on 9 September 2000 coincided with the advent of the new millennium and was won by Selva (Forest), by jockey Giuseppe Pes riding on the horse Urban II. Prior to this, the last extraordinary Palio was held on 13 September 1986 to celebrate the centenary of the abolition of the Balia and Biccherna governments.

In earlier times, the third Palio was a way to honor distinguished guests passing through or visiting Siena. Examples are the extraordinary Palio of 7 June 1676, during the visit to Siena of the wife of Prince Don Agostino Chigi, and that of 15 June 1673 (not considered official), honouring the visit to Siena of Cardinal Flavio Chigi. Even the Grand Duke of Tuscany requested another round of Palio, perhaps closer to the ordinary.

From the second half of the 19th century, extraordinary Palios began to be organized for celebration of special events, rather than illustrious visits. This was the case of a meeting of the Society of Sciences or the inauguration of important monuments (such as the inauguration of the monument to the fallen in the Battle of Curtatone and Montanara, on 29 May 1893). In 1896, they even ran four Palios, both ordinary and two extraordinary. The first extraordinary race was on 16 August, which is considered extraordinary because it was requested by the citizens as the original race was moved to 25 August due to transfer from Siena's VIII Corps, and the second was on 23 September for the inauguration of the monument to Giuseppe Garibaldi.

A third Palio, the "Palio of Peace", was held in 1945 by popular acclaim to celebrate the end of World War II and was won by Gioacchino Calabro riding Rubacuori su Folco, for the contrada of Drago (Dragon). An extraordinary Palio was held in 1969 to commemorate the landing on the Moon by the Apollo 11 mission.

After 1945 the habit of running extraordinary palios to mark important centenaries emerged. A palio was held on 28 May 1950 to celebrate the five hundredth anniversary of the canonization of Saint Bernardine of Siena. On 5 June 1961 an extraordinary palio marked the centenary of unification. The most recent centenary palio, held on 20 October 2018, commemorated the ending of the First World War in 1918.

== Health and safety controversy ==
For several years, the Palio has been the focus of numerous protests by animal rights organizations, including the Anti-Vivisection League. Concerns include primarily race incidents causing falls, which in some cases have led to horses' deaths.

In 2011, these concerns resulted in Italy's tourism minister blocking the Palio from being nominated for listing in the UNESCO Intangible Cultural Heritage Lists.

The results of calculations on the percentage of accidents caused by the Palio vary depending on who makes them. According to the Anti-Vivisection League, a total of 48 horses have died from 1970 to 2007, an average of one dead horse per year. However, the calculations carried out by supporters of the Palio for the same period, which include all the tests held before the real race, give a rate of 2.05% of fatal accidents per ride. Injuries to riders is also significant. A recent study suggests in 96.1% of the Palio races between 1945 and 2017 resulted in the fall of at least one jockey during the race.

Many rules governing the protection of animals have been developed and implemented only since the 1990s; supporters of the Palio stress that injuries have been drastically reduced since then.

In recent decades, the city of Siena has adopted a series of measures to ensure the protection of horses (and riders) before, during and after the race, but these measures are still judged insufficient by some animal welfare groups, who continue to seek abolition of the race. Among the measures taken include:

- Approval in 1999 of the Protocollo per l’addestramento dei cavalli da Palio, or the "Protocol for the provision of incentives for the maintenance of the Palio horse" enacted an agreement between the municipality and third party groups for the increased protection of horses. This established a register of horses trained to run. A register of farmers of horses intended for Palio was then introduced in 2004, instead of the use of half blood Arabian horses (deemed physically fit to travel). Today, jockeys must register their horses online with the municipality.
- A compulsory health check held by a commission appointed by the City Council and consisting of two surgeons.
- Improvements to training for horses. Including building a similar track in Mociano, identical in shape and slope to the Piazza del Campo. From March to June, horses train here, in addition to alternative tracks at Monticiano and Monteroni d'Arbia.
- Creating a protective barrier, or materassoni, around the curve of St. Martin. This was built in June 1999, made of high absorption PVC, which raised the parapet of the House and the curve of shirts for improved safety.
- Improvements to the safety of the track itself. This includes interventions to the composition, method of implementation and monitoring of the layer of tuff, or mud track of the race.
- An alcohol test, conducted via breathalyzer, for jockeys was made legal in 2012 by the order of the Secretary of Health Francesca Martini. In February 2025 Siena municipality published an update to the race protocols, Protocollo per l’addestramento dei cavalli da Palio per l’anno 2025, which allows for random drug and alcohol testing beginning in the training period.

== Photo gallery ==
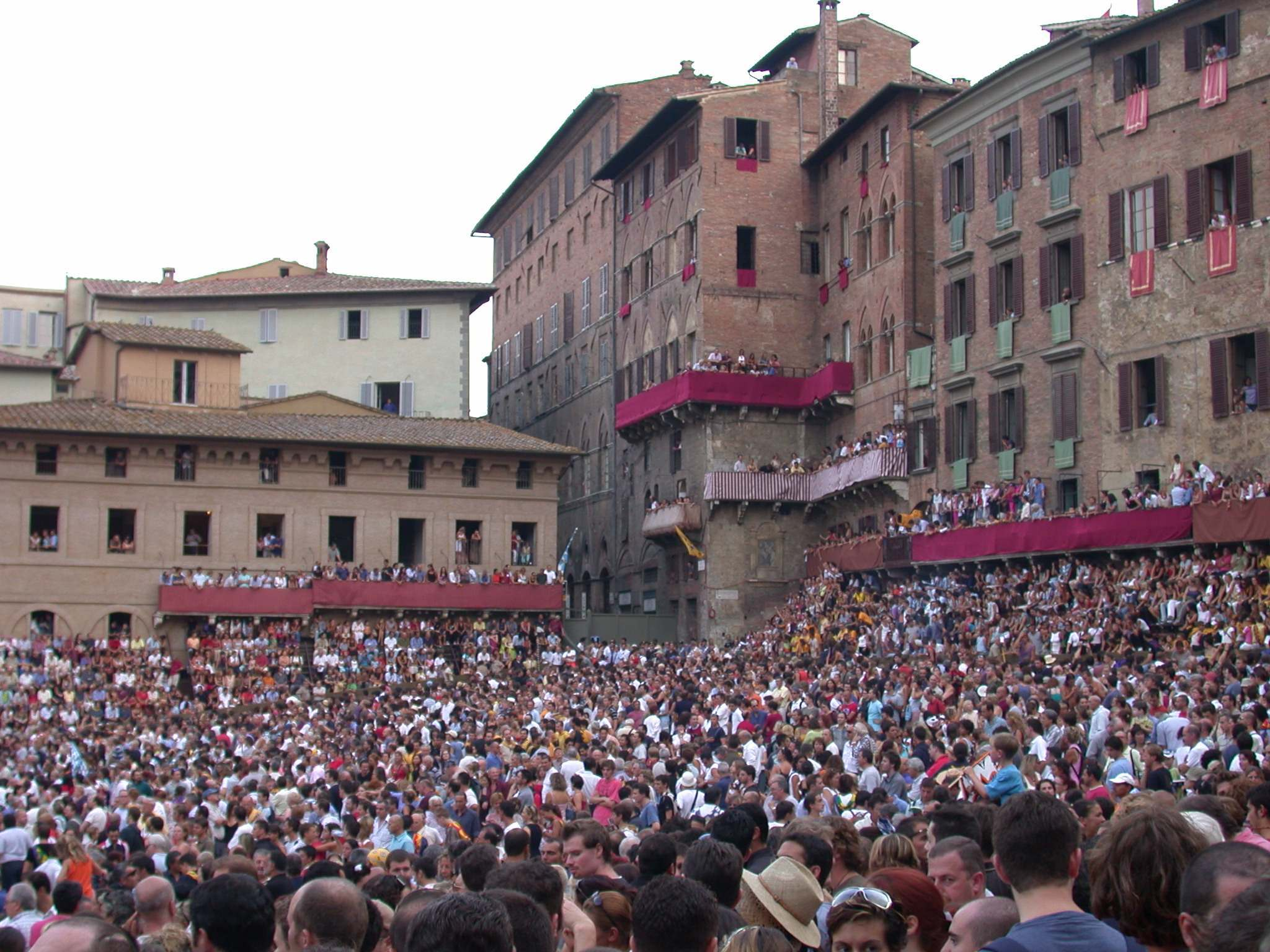
Thousands of spectators come to Piazza del Campo during the Palio di Siena.

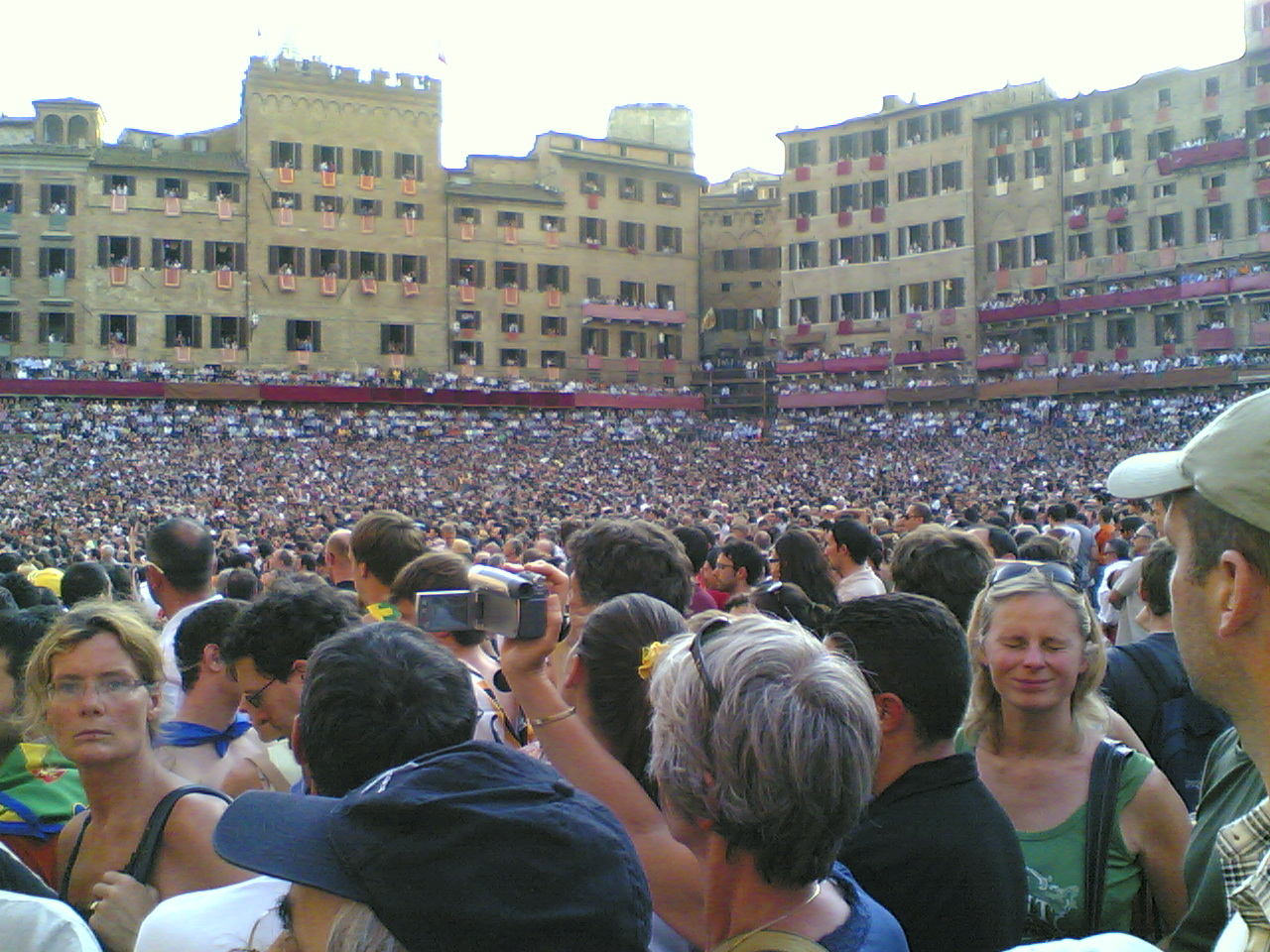
The crowd fills the Piazza del Campo just before departure.

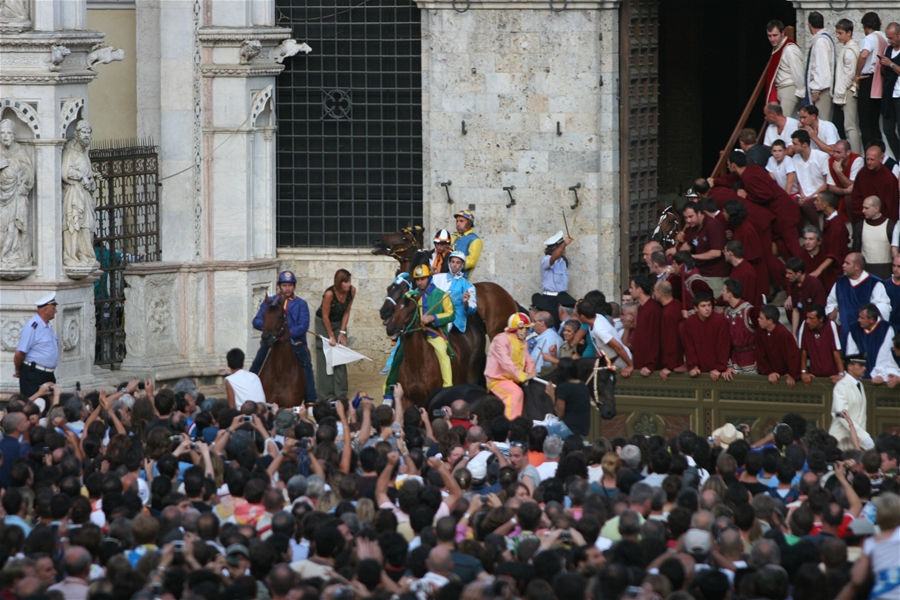
The horses come into the Piazza del Campo for a grand entrance.

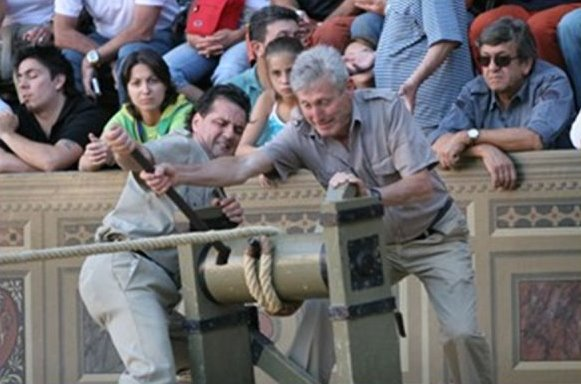
Municipality workers tighten the ropes just at the beginning of the race.

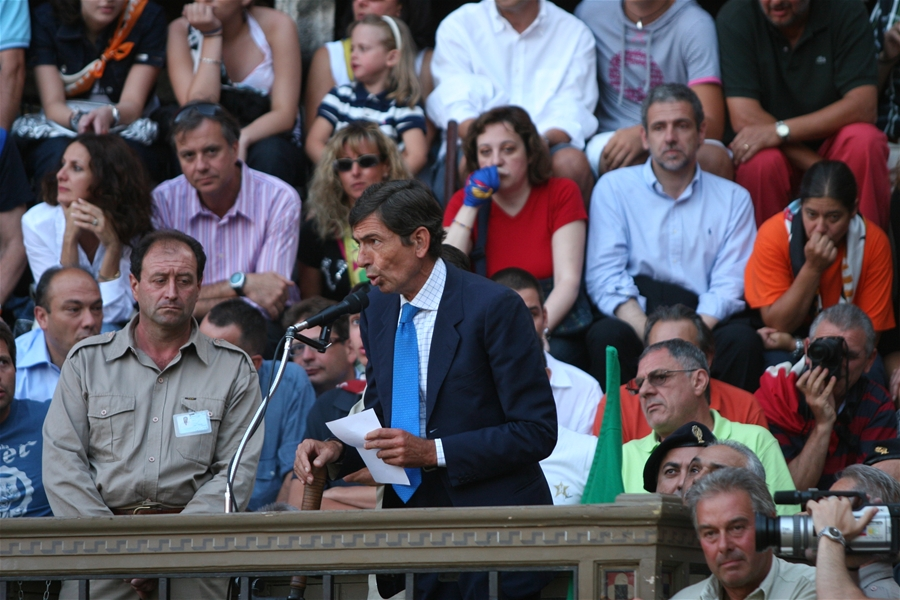
Each contrada is called to take its place before the race.

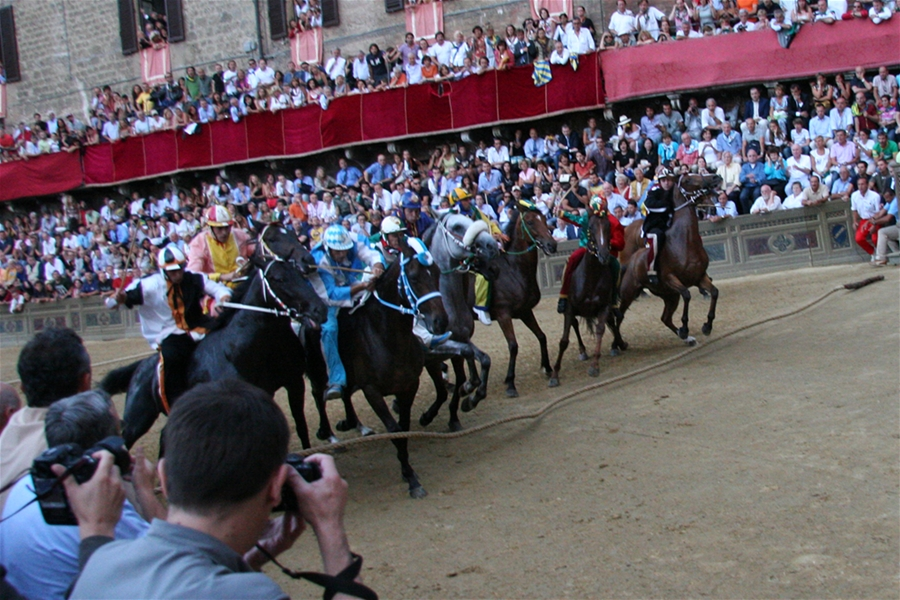
The last horse enters; the move is valid: race starts.

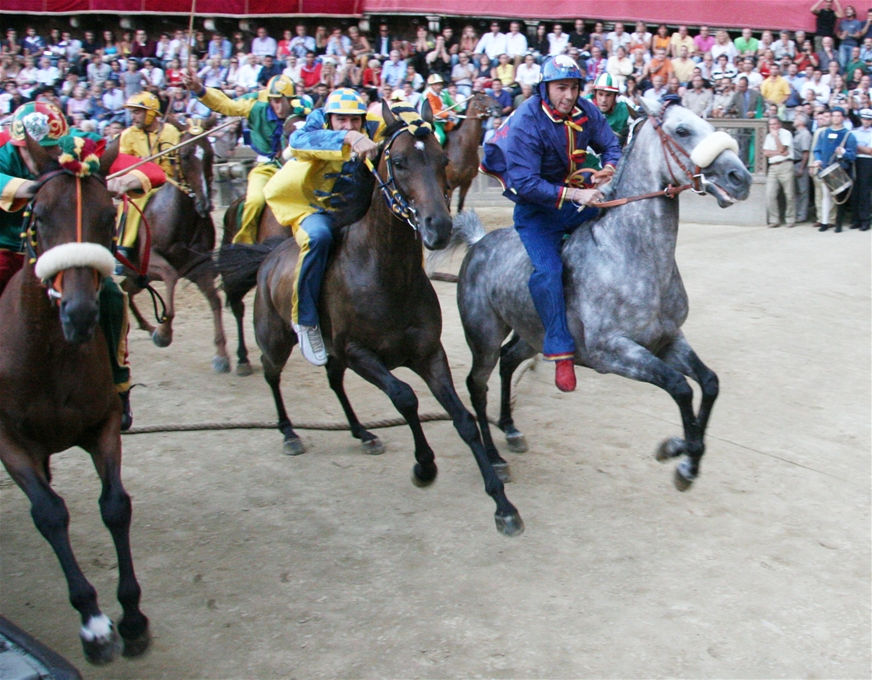
The start of the Palio of 16 August 2006

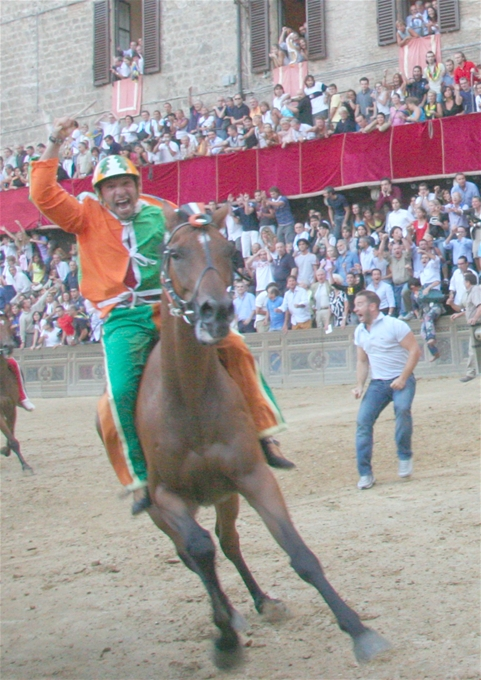
Alberto Ricceri expresses his joy at the victory on 16 August 2006 for Selva (Forest).

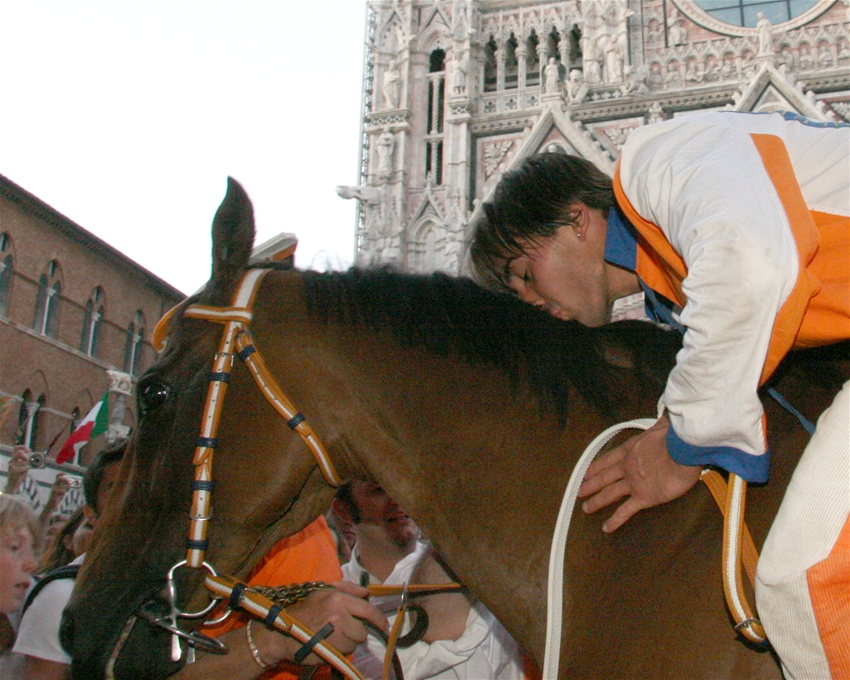
Jonatan Bartoletti kisses Brento in thanks, before entering the Church for Maria Mater Gratiae.

== In movies and television ==
The Palio di Siena is seen in the following films:

- Palio by Alessandro Blasetti (1932)
- La ragazza del Palio by Luigi Zampa (1957)
- Bianco rosso celeste – cronaca dei giorni del Palio di Siena by Luciano Emmer (1963)
- "The Winds Rise", the first episode of the 1983 miniseries The Winds of War, ABC miniseries directed by Dan Curtis
- Summer's Lease (1989)
- Il bianco e il nero – Tutti i colori del Palio di Siena by Anton Giulio Onofri (2002)
- The Last Victory by John Appel (2004)
- Visioni di Palio by Anton Giulio Onofri (2004)
- Piazza delle Cinque Lune by Renzo Martinelli (2006)
- Quantum of Solace, the 22nd James Bond movie, directed by Marc Forster (2008)
- Palio by Cosima Spender and John Hunt (2015)
- Tucci in Italy, Season 1, Episode 1 (2025)
- Solo Mio (2026)

== See also ==
- Bravio delle botti of Montepulciano
- Palio di Legnano
