= Piazza del Campo =

Square in Siena, Italy

- Il Campo
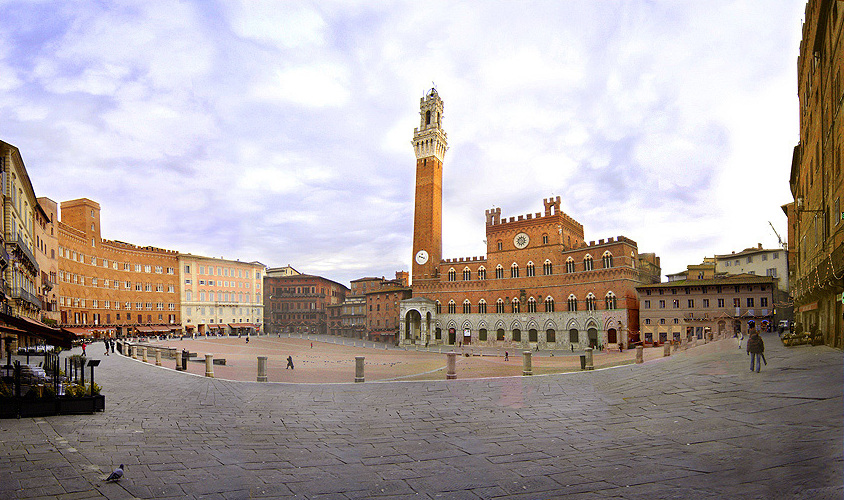

- Location within Tuscany
- Location: Siena, Tuscany, Italy
- Coordinates: 43°19′06″N 11°19′53″E

Construction
- Completed: 12th century

Other
- Status: pedestrianised

Piazza del Campo is the main public space of the historic center of Siena, a city in Tuscany, Italy. Its name comes from the Italian word campanilismo, which translates to "local pride" and campanile "bell tower." The campo is regarded as one of Europe's greatest medieval squares. It is renowned worldwide for its beauty and architectural integrity. The Palazzo Pubblico and its Torre del Mangia, as well as various palazzi signorili, surround the scallop shell-shaped piazza. At the northwest edge is the Fonte Gaia.

The twice-a-year horse race, Palio di Siena, is held around the edges of the piazza. The piazza is also the finish location of the annual road cycling race Strade Bianche.

The Campo is located within the Historic Centre of Siena, which was inscribed as a UNESCO World Heritage Site in 1995 for its exceptional preservation of medieval city planning and architectural coherence.

== History ==
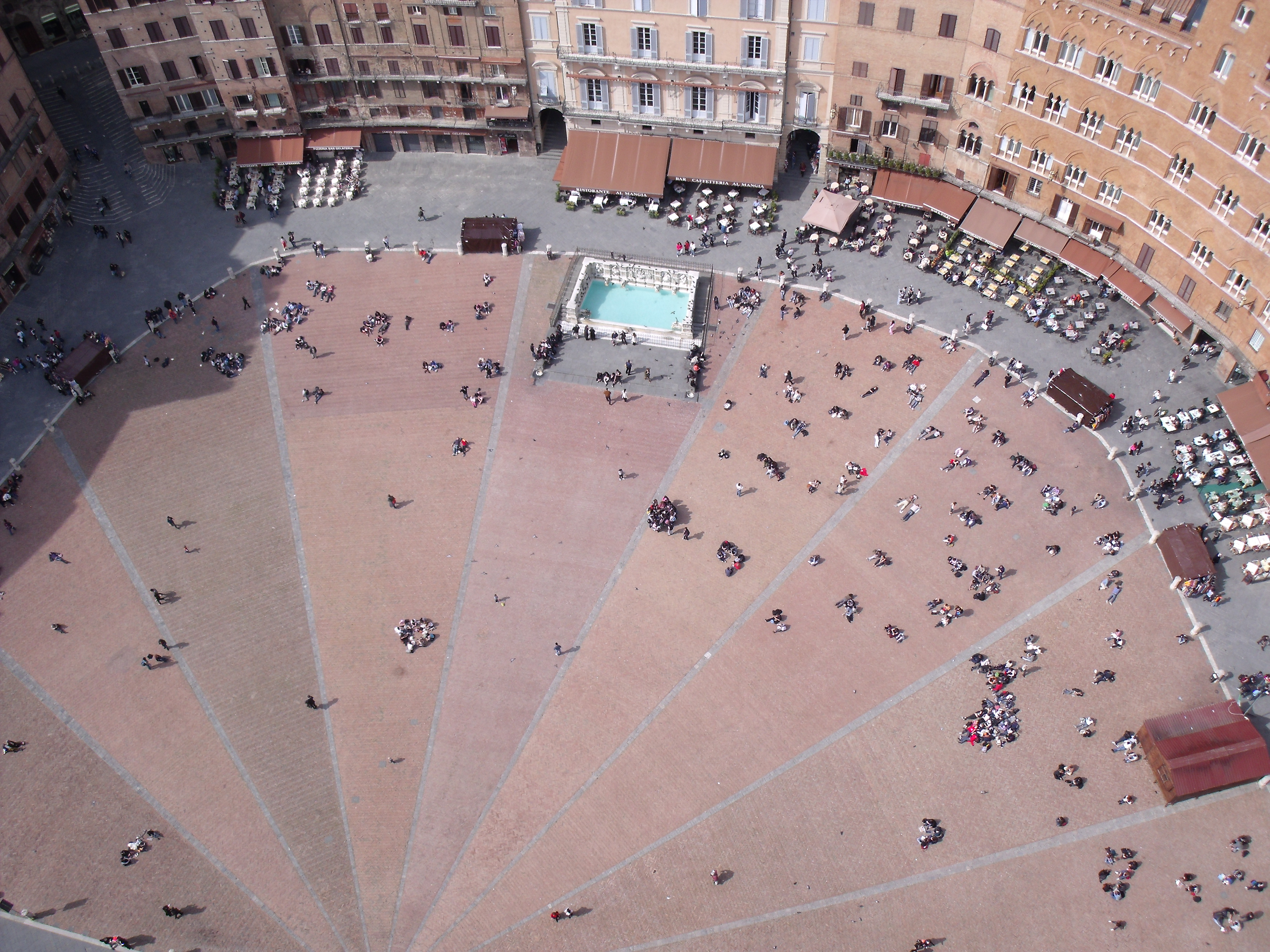
Gores of brick paving laid out to resemble a shell, viewed from the Torre del Mangia

The open site was established before the thirteenth century on a sloping site near the meeting point of the three hillside communities that coalesced to form Siena: the Castellare, the San Martino, and the Camollia. It became a social gathering for communities; they established a marketplace and site for activities such as games, fights, and races. Siena may have had earlier Etruscan settlements, but they were not considerable Roman settlements, and the campo does not lie on the site of a Roman forum, as is sometimes suggested. During the Middle Ages, Siena was a wealthy self-governing city-state in competition with its neighbor Florence. Taxes were collected to start funding the long construction of a city hall. By 1169, the Piazza del Campo was organized to be constructed. In 1260, the Sienese and papal ally Florence came into conflict at the Battle of Montaperti. Florence was defeated. Due to Florence's loss, Siena became excommunicated, impacting much of Siena's wealth and trade. Peace was restored in 1270, and civic pride became important to the Sienese culture and motivated the use of public space as a civic statement. The plaza was fully paved in 1349, with eight lines that divided the piazza into nine sections. The number of divisions is held to be symbolic of the rule of The Nine (Noveschi) who laid out the campo and governed Siena at the height of its medieval splendor between 1292–1355. The piazza measures 425 feet by 650 feet, much larger than typical medieval standards at the time, but it was large enough to hold the entire population when it was built, about 50,000 people. The campo was and remains, the focal point of public life in the city.

== Architecture and landscape ==
The palazzi signorili that lined the square housed the families of those who dominated city governance at the time the PIazza del Campo was built, such as the Sansedoni, the Piccolomini, and the Saracini. Their homes have unified rooflines, deliberately built to demonstrate a sense of decorum in contrast to earlier high tower houses — seen as emblems of communal strife — such as may still be seen not far from Siena at San Gimignano. In the statutes of Siena, civic and architectural decorum was ordered: "...it responds to the beauty of the city of Siena and to the satisfaction of almost all people of the same city that any edifices that are to be made anew anywhere along the public thoroughfares... proceed in line with the existent buildings and one building not stand out beyond another, but they shall be disposed and arranged equally so as to be of the greatest beauty for the city." The unity of these Late Gothic houses is affected in part by the uniformity of the bricks of which their walls are built: brick-making was a monopoly of the commune, which saw to it that standards were maintained. At the foot of the Palazzo Pubblico's wall is the late Gothic Chapel of the Virgin built as an ex voto by the Sienese, after the terrible Black Death of 1348 had ended.

The Piazza del Campo's structure has a focalizing effect, and it resembles a Baroque theater with facades surrounding it, windows focused on it, and the Piazza Pubblico acting as the back of the "stage." The piazza slopes down to the Piazza Pubblico and that slope falls about 15 feet from the North to the South side. Materials and colors are varied, but the campo is mostly made of brick and stucco in warm colors. The bright brick pavement is harmonizing, and it's designed to provide a feeling of openness and welcome. Often visitors sit on the brick as if it were a grassy field. The red brick pavement is separated into 9 wedges each filled with a herringbone pattern and the eight-line divisions bordered with traverine. The surrounding facades and narrow streets create a defined form. The streets are narrow and winding and only give glimpses of the square, very little of the square is seen until it is entered through one of the 11 access points. This design creates contrast between light and dark as well as compression and release. The curved shape of the streets and the campo are the results of the city's topography but also serve practical benefits. The winding streets are protected from wind and sun. The scooped pavement collects rainwater. The lowest point of the piazza, and where the 9 wedges meet, is the drain framed in stone called the Gavinone. The Piazza's architectural style evolved through the centuries. Many of the original surrounding towers were taken down during the Baroque period and houses facing the Palazzo Pubblico lost their medieval style. Balconies with rectangular openings replaced the pointed arches of the windows and in the 19th century, there was a desire to renovate the city in a medieval style. Important social ideals of Siena including protection, community, and civic responsibility, are modeled in the design of the Piazza del Campo.

== Fonte Gaia ==
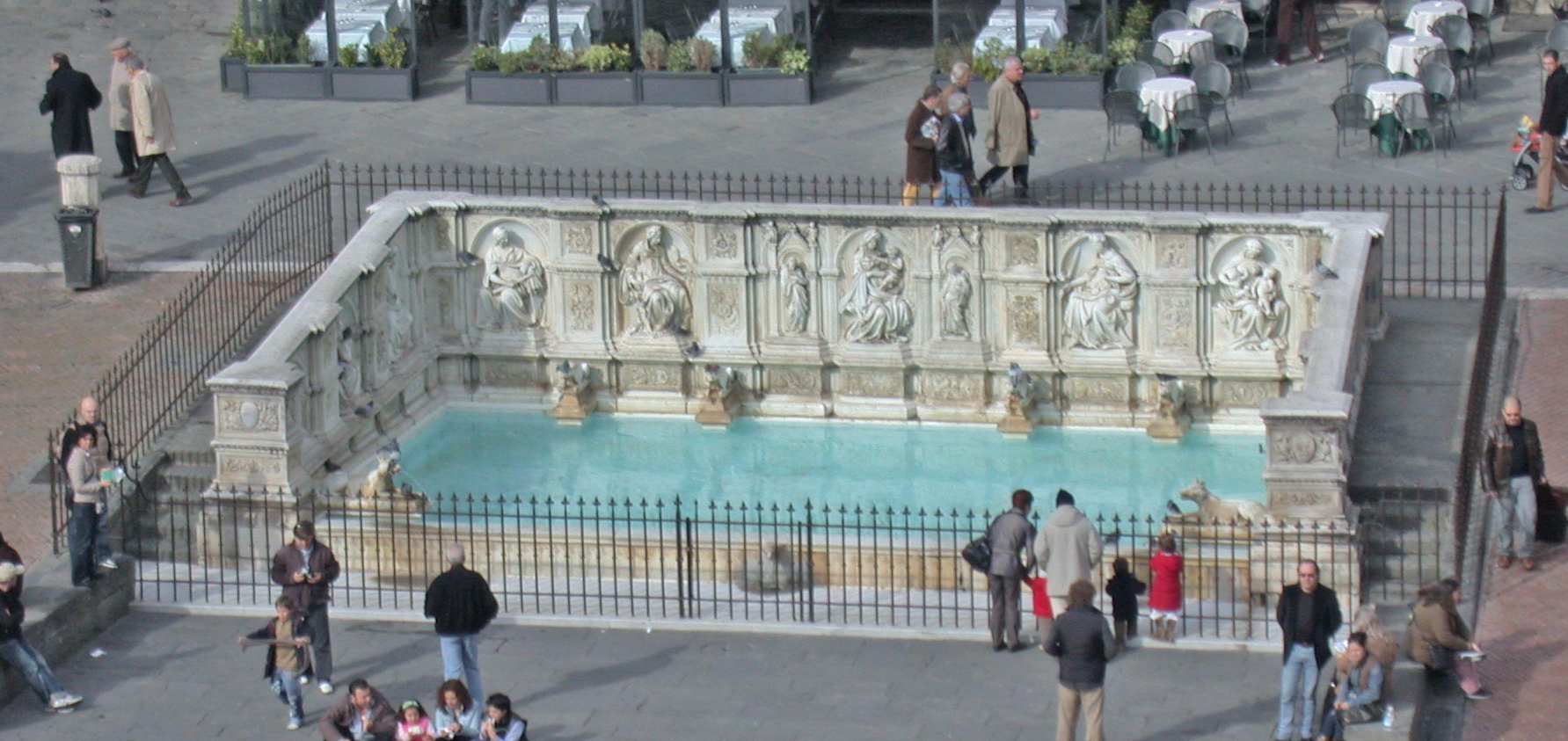
Fonte Gaia

The Fonte Gaia ("Joyous Fountain") was built in 1419 as an endpoint of the system of conduits bringing water to the city's centre. It replaced an earlier fountain that had been completed about 1342 when construction of the water conduits was completed. Under the direction of the Committee of Nine, many miles of tunnels were constructed to bring water in aqueducts to fountains and thence to drain to the surrounding fields.

A center of attraction for the many tourists, the present fountain is in the shape of a rectangular basin that is adorned on three sides with many bas-reliefs featuring the Madonna surrounded by the Classical and the Christian Virtues, emblematic of Good Government under the patronage of the Madonna. The white marble Fonte Gaia was originally designed and built by Jacopo della Quercia, whose bas-reliefs from the basin's sides are conserved in the Ospedale di St. Maria della Scala in Piazza Duomo. The original sculptures of goddesses featured on the 1419 fountain were replaced in 1866 by free copies by Tito Sarrocchi, who omitted Jacopo della Quercia's two nude statues of Rhea Silvia and Acca Larentia that the nineteenth-century city fathers found too pagan or too nude. When they had been set up in 1419, Jacopo della Quercia's nude figures were the first two female nudes, who were neither Eve nor a repentant saint, to stand in a public place since Antiquity.

== In popular culture ==
Netflix series Can This Love Be Translated? which follows the romance between interpreter Joo Ho-jin and actress Cha Mu-hee, was filmed in the plaza in early December 2024.
