= Theatres in Florence =

There are about thirty theatres in Florence, Italy (not counting those already closed or dismantled), and range from historic theatres, to national and municipal music halls.

There are four theaters devoted to classical music and opera (Comunale, Verdi, Pergola and Goldoni). Many citizens and tourists regularly visit these theatre halls, with over six hundred thousand tickets sold per season, compared with just under four hundred thousand residents.

== List ==
Name	Founded	Seats	Notes	Image
Roman Theatre	1st century AD	15,000	Under Palazzo Vecchio, destroyed	
Roman Amphitheatre	124-130	20,000	Between Piazza dei Peruzzi, Via dei Bentaccordi and Via Tòrta, now included in medieval edifices	
Teatro di via dell'Acqua	around 1490	?	Teatro della Confraternita (later Accademia) del Vangelista	
Teatrino della Baldracca	1576		Today home to the Uffizi Library	
Teatro Mediceo	1586		In today's Uffizi, in Classicist style, later dismantled	
Amphitheater of Boboli	1637		At Palazzo Pitti, still used today for special events	
Teatro Niccolini (Teatro del Cocomero)	1648	c. 500	The first "modern" theatre in the city. Reopened in 2015.	
Teatro della Pergola	1656	999	The oldest active theatre and opera house in Florence; first teatro all'italiana	
Teatro Alfieri	1740		Demolished in 1928	
Teatro Rinuccini	1753		Still used today for special events	
Teatro della Piazza vecchia	1759	?	Closed, today is a private palace	
Teatro dei Solleciti o Borgognissanti	1778	?	Closed in 1887, today is a church (Chiesa Evangelica Battista)	
Teatro degli Intrepidi (o Teatro Nuovo)	1779		Dismantled at the beginning of 1900	
Sala del Conservatorio Luigi Cherubini	1784	120		
Teatro Nazionale	1789		Closed	
Saloncino della Pergola	1804	324		
Teatro Goldoni	1817	363	Restored and re-opened in 1997. Used by Opera di Firenze/ Maggio Musicale Fiorentino.	
Saloncino Castinelli	1817	?	Inside the Teatro Goldoni building, today, a movie theater	
Teatro Diurno o Arena Goldoni	1818	1,500	Dismantled	
Teatro Standish	around 1838		Inside a private palace	
Teatro dei Concordi	1839	?	Closed in 1854	
Teatro Verdi	1854	1,538	(Old name: Teatro Pagliano)	
Teatro Comunale	1862	1,800	Maggio Musicale Fiorentino's base	
Teatro Arena Nazionale	1864		It was an open-air arena, today is a (closed) movie theater (Cinema Apollo)	
Teatro Umberto I	around 1864		Destroyed, it was in the centre of piazza d'Azeglio (square)	
Teatro delle Logge	around 1865		Inside the Loggia del Grano building, near the Palazzo Vecchio. Since 1910 Italian Folies Bergère, then a movie theater (Cinema Capitol), and then, briefly, a store.	
Teatro dell'Affratellamento	1876			
Teatro Arena San Salvi	1890	100		
Teatro dell'Istituto Francese	1911	99		
Teatro di Rifredi	1914	286		
Teatro 13	1931	152		
Cinema Teatro Nuovo Sentiero	around 1933	239		
Teatro Puccini	1940	634	Used mainly for comedies and variety shows	
Auditorium FLOG	1945	1,000	Used mainly for pop/rock concerts	
Teatro Estivo Il Boschetto	1947	300	An open-air arena	
Teatro l'Amicizia	around 1950		Closed	
Teatro dell'Oriuolo	1951		Closed	
Teatro Everest	1958	240	In Galluzzo, a suburb of Florence	
Teatro Nuovo	1964	170		
Sala Vanni	1972	192		
Teatro del Rondò di Bacco	1975	96	At Palazzo Pitti, still used today for special events	
Sala Teatro Cinema ACLI Ponte a Ema	around 1975	120	In Ponte a Ema, a suburb of Florence	
Teatro Reims	1976	290		
Teatro Saschall	1978	1,700	Used mainly for pop/rock concerts (Old name: Teatro Tenda)	
Piccolo Teatro Comunale (Ridotto)	1983	587		
Teatro Le Laudi	1983	254		
Teatro della Compagnia	1987	500	Closed	
Teatro La Fiaba	1991	300		
Teatro di Cestello	1993	192	Near the church of San Frediano in Cestello	
Stazione Leopolda Fabbrica Europa	1994		It was a railway station. Wide building, used for various purposes (also theater, since 1994)	
Teatro della Limonaia di Villa Strozzi	1998	380	It was the old orangery of Villa Strozzi al Boschetto - project by Giuseppe Poggi, middle of 1800. Decayed, it's been restored in 1998 - project by Giovanni Michelucci (1973) revisited by Bruno Sacchi (1987).	
Auditorium Clinica Medica	1999	140		
Arena Cinecittà Teatro San Quirico	2000	150		
Teatro Cantiere Florida	2002	296		
Circolo Teatro del Sale	2003	99	Restaurant and theatre	
Teatro Auditorium al Duomo	2006	275	Near the Florence Cathedral	
Parco della musica e della cultura	around 2011	c. 8,000	Under construction. It will be the new Maggio Musicale Fiorentino's base	

== See also ==
- Music of Florence
