= Music of Florence =

The music of Florence is foundational in the history of Western European music. Music was an important part of the Italian Renaissance. It was in Florence that the Florentine Camerata convened in the mid-16th century and experimented with setting tales of Greek mythology to music and staging the result—in other words, the first operas, setting the wheels in motion not just for the further development of the operatic form, but for later developments of separate "classical" forms such as the symphony.

== History ==
Pre-1450 Florence had a very important music history during the Italian Trecento and was one of the main centres of the Italian Ars nova.

=== Civic music ===
In Florence, the most substantial patron of music until the fall of the Republic was the city itself; therefore, music was primarily used as a symbol of the city's cultural achievements. Civic musicians first appeared in civic record starting in the 13th century. These musicians were all wind players and worked in civic ensembles. In 1383, Florence made clear subdivisions between its civic instrumental ensembles, singling out the pifferi (or piffero band) from the rest of the musicians. By 1390, three basic instrumental ensembles were all in clear formation: the pifferi (3 players), trombetti (trumpets 5-6 players), and the trombadori (8-10 players), including six large trumpets, 1 drummer, and a ciaramella player.

The Pifferi

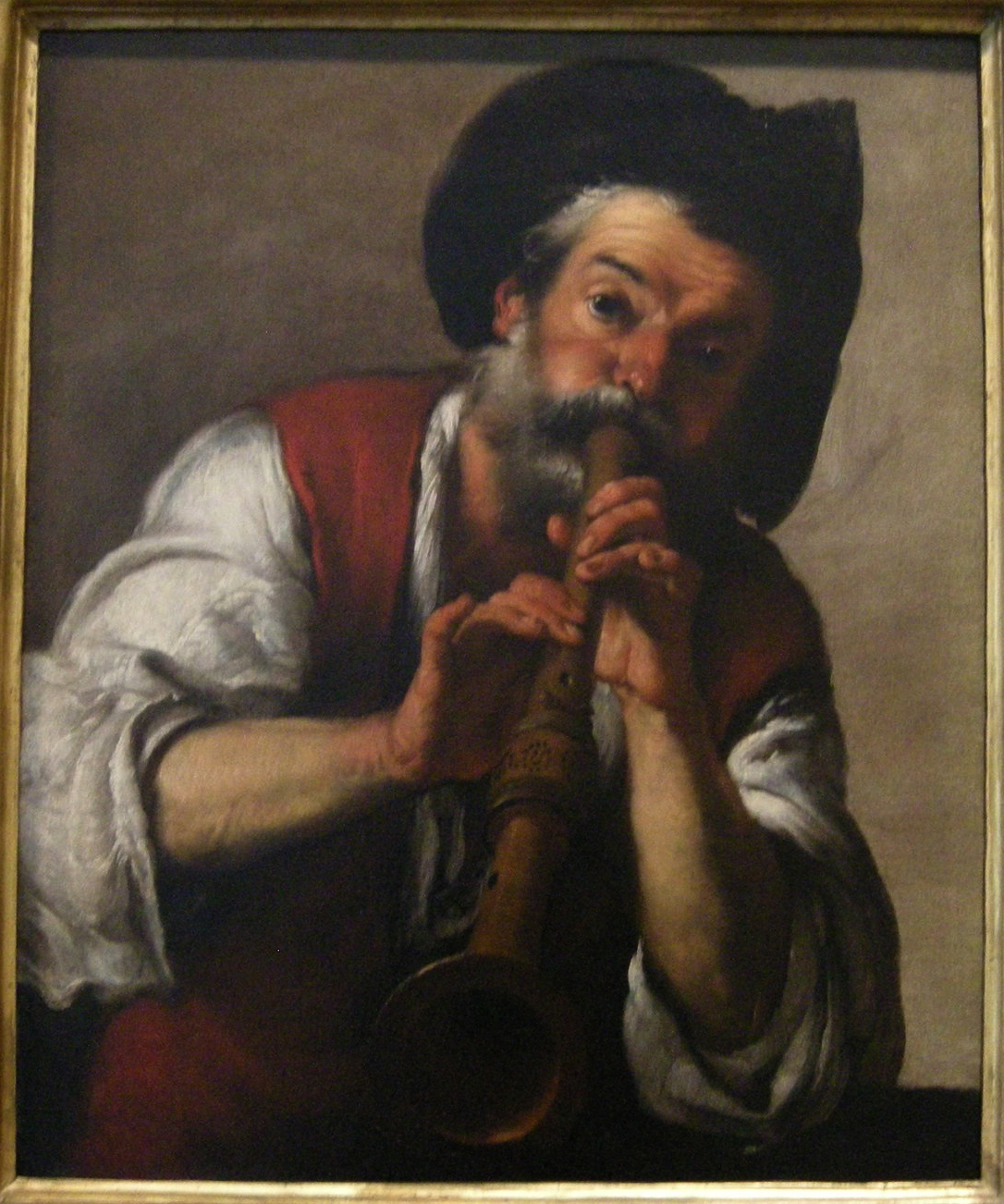
Pifferaio by Bernardo Strozzi, Palazzo Rosso (Genova)

The Pifferi provided music at important civic occasions, daily at the Palazzo Vecchio (City Hall), and private functions for the aristocratic families, especially the Medici. This group is commonly noted as the most sophisticated of the three groups. Sometimes this ensemble also played for religious services on the Virgil of the feast of the Blessed Virgin, Easter, and at solemn Matins on the Sundays when the image of the Mother of God was exhibited. In 1443, the Pifferi added a fourth member, so that the group included: 2 shawms, 1 bombard, and 1 trombone. As with the vocal performing groups, there was a strong preference for foreign musicians in these ensembles, especially for German trombonists. (German instrumentalists were known for both their strong performance proficiency as also their skills as improvisers.) When it was decided to hire a trombonist to join the pifferi forces, it was agreed to hire a German musician for this trombone position. When he was hired, officials subsequently fired the three native, Florentine shawm players and replaced them all with German speaking musicians. At this time, city officials also passed a motion declaring that only foreigners should hold positions in the pifferi. These positions generally ran in families: father to son, brother to brother. The addition of a 4th musician to the pifferi, and the funds needed for this addition, reflect the continual development of the group's musical repertory, as well as the ensemble's important function within Florentine culture.

Toward the end of the 15th century, string music (especially that played on viols) became widely popular in Italy and all of Europe. But this development is not reflected in Florence's civic financial records; instead, the three civic ensembles were all well maintained and only continued to grow. For example, around 1510 the pifferi expanded to 5 players (3 shawms, 2 trombones). Only 10 years later, it expanded again to 6 musicians (4 shawms, 2 trombones).

Life for civic musicians

Life for the members of these groups was very comfortable. The government provided their musicians with clothing, housing, meals, right to name their successor, and the opportunity to supplement their wages. They were also the highest paid of public servants, and were allowed to dine in the private dining room at the Palazzo. Needless to say, these positions were prestigious and highly desirable. After retiring, they received a pension. The trombetti and pifferi could travel to other nearby cities, always representing Florence. But only on the most special of occasions did the three civic ensembles all play together.

When the wave of humanism originated in Florence focused around Marsilio Ficino and his circles, there was a preference amongst the humanists for music performed for the bas groups: improvised poetry accompanied by soft instruments. However, this growing interest is not reflected in civic records. No bas musicians were being paid by the city for their music. During this time, however, the three main civic groups flourished, especially the pifferi.

=== Festival music ===
In addition to these important civic occasions, the city of Florence celebrated carnival twice annually. These festivals took place before Lent and during Calendimaggio, which celebrated the return of spring beginning on May 1 and ending on the feast day of John the Baptist, the patron saint of Florence. People from all classes of society gathered in the streets of Florence and participated in processions, parades, singing, dancing, and revelry. The evening festivities were particularly elaborate and involved collaboration between artists, poets, composers, and musicians. Their first task was to envision the concept and text for a carnival song (canti carnascialeschi) and then to present their creation on a float with costumes, singers, and musicians. A large portion of texts depicted a particular guild trade attempting to sell a product, and the mark of a good setting was in the poet's employment of double entendre. For example, the Song of the Chimney Sweepers (or canzona de' spazzacamini) has a number of witty references:

"Neighbours, neighbours, neighbours,
who wants their chimneys swept?
Your chimneys, signora?
who wants them to be swept,
swept inside and out,
who wants them well cleaned,
whoever can’t pay us
just give us some bread or wine."

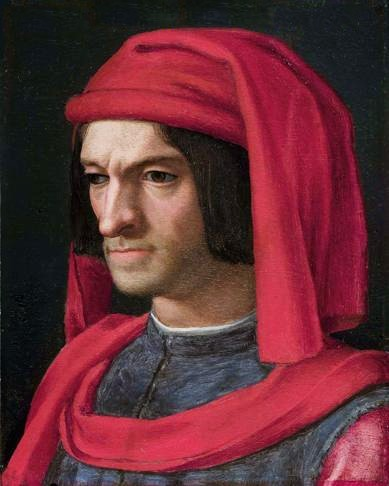
Portrait of Lorenzo de'Medici by Agnolo Bronzino at the Uffizi in Florence

Because carnival songs were primarily an oral tradition, only 300 texts have survived, and of these, about 70 contain music. Much of the repertory from the Laurentian period is preserved through the Italian devotional laude. These include the instruction cantasi come (translation: "to be sung to") followed by the title of a particular carnival song. One example of this is Lorenzo de' Medici's lauda, "O maligno e duro core", which is sung to "La canzona de' Valenziani" (Song of the Perfumers). In the later part of Lorenzo's life, more serious and philosophical texts were written, including his most famous poem, "Canzona di Bacco, ovvero Il trionfo di Bacco e Arianna" (Song of Bacchus, or The Triumph of Bacchus and Ariadne).

=== Devotional music ===
As we have seen, the Italian lauda often shared the same music with the secular carnival song. However, the music grew out of a different and more spiritual tradition—namely the lay confraternities in Florence during the 12th and 13th centuries. These were groups of lay individuals that formed under the Dominican, Franciscan, and mendicant orders who devoted themselves to God, promoted the common good for themselves and the city, and practiced charitable works. Several different types of Florentine devotional companies formed, but the ones that concern us musically are the laudesi companies. These companies organized their own liturgical services and also met each evening to sing laude in veneration of the Virgin Mary. Because the laude were sung by members of the company, they were originally monophonic and often in the poetic form of the ballata, but beginning in the 14th and early 15th centuries, singers were paid for their service, instrumentalists were hired, and the number of singers increased. By 1470 and continuing into the 16th century, the companies had established choirs of around five to eleven singers who could perform three- or four-part polyphony.

The lauda's form and style varied according to the musical and poetic culture. Some of the chief poets included Lorenzo de' Medici and his mother Lucrezia Tornabuoni de’ Medici, Feo Belcari, Francesco degli Albizzi, and Ser Michele Chelli. The musical style ranged from organal textures, simple note-against-note polyphony, works in the style of early Dufay, syllabic and homorhythmic declamation, and cantilena textures with supportive lower voices. Simple two-part settings were also prominent and could have been embellished or have included a third improvised part.

Savonarola’s dominance at the end of the Cinquecento led to a prolific period for the lauda. He was a Dominican friar who sought to reform the church, preaching on repentance and foretelling Florence as the New Jerusalem. Adamantly opposed to the activities of carnival, he deputized his followers and the fanciulli (boys and adolescents) to sing laude throughout the streets during the festival season. Because of his outspoken criticisms, he was excommunicated by the pope and executed.

A major source for the lauda is Serafino Razzi’s Libro primo delle laudi spirituali published in 1563. Razzi was a Dominican friar who promoted Savonarola's veneration. His anthology contains 91 musical settings for 1-4 voices and transmits 180 lauda texts. Much of what we know about both the lauda and the carnival song repertory from the 15th century comes out of this important source.

=== Patronage of music ===
Several kinds of musical patronage existed in Florence during the 15th and early 16th centuries, with respect to both sacred and secular music: state, corporate, church, and private.

==== State patronage ====
The Herald was one position supported by the Florentine government. Heralds performed music during the twice-daily meals for the Signoria, held in the Palazzo Vecchio. One type of songs which heralds performed were canzoni morali, or moral songs. Many of the Herald's songs would have likely been improvised because their subjects would have often been transitory, such as current events. Perhaps the best example of state patronage in Florence is the patronage of the civic groups, the trombadori, trombetti, and pifferi. Originally, the trombadori and the Herald served as the performers for public ceremonies. After the 1370s, the two other groups were added. Like the Herald, these two groups played a role both in public ceremony and the daily meals of the Signoria. The government also patronized the civic groups to provide the music required to honor visiting dignitaries. The civic musicians thus served a particular and necessary role in the complex system of rituals followed for visitors. In some cases, state and church patronage of music overlapped, such as when the Florentine government had the civic musicians perform for church services, for example when they performed at Orsanmichele on feast days.

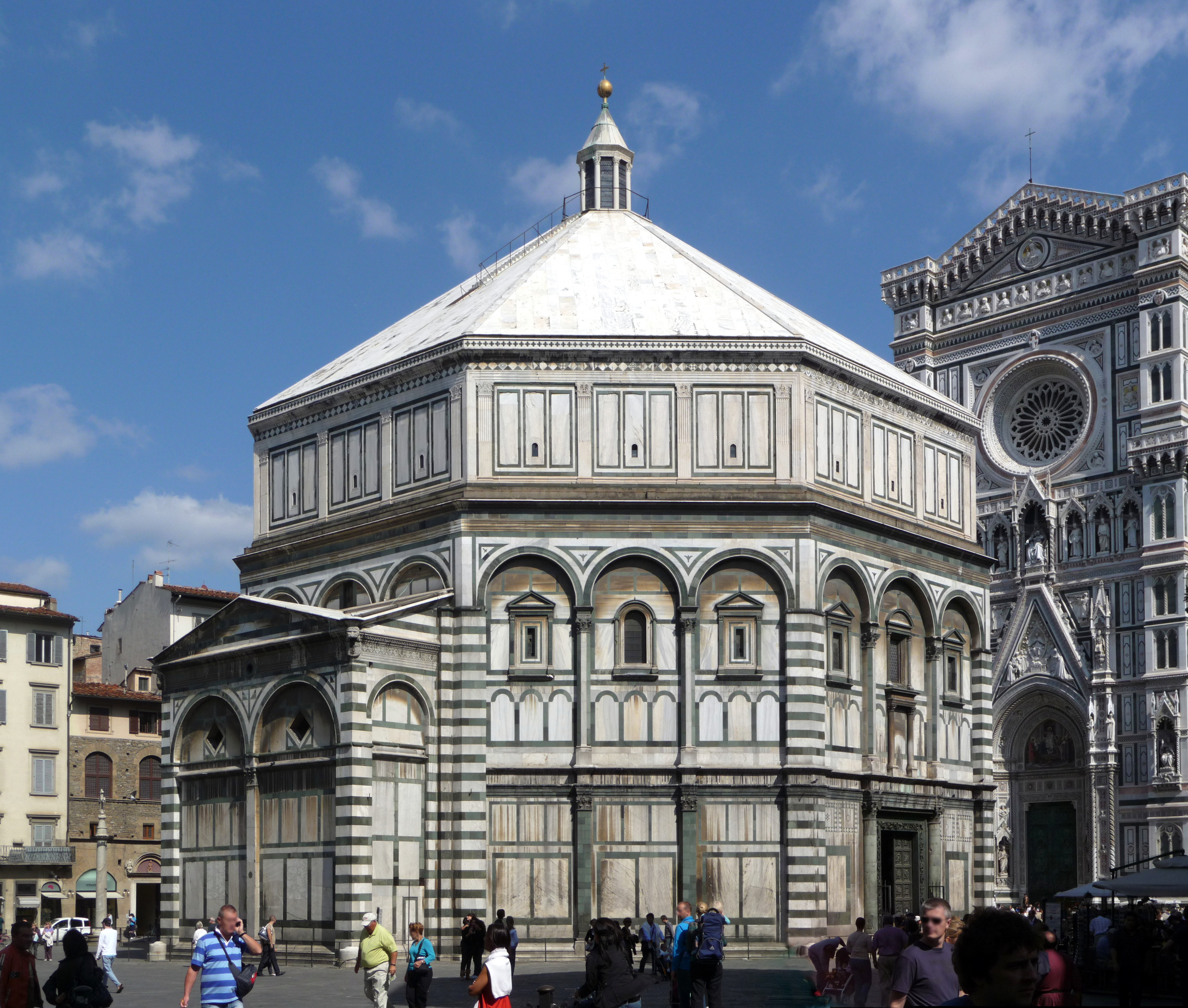
Florence Baptistery

==== Corporate patronage ====
In Florence, the guilds were responsible for the upkeep and business of the Florence Cathedral, and the Florence Baptistery. Particularly, the Arte della lana, the wool guild, was responsible for the cathedral, and the Arte della calimala, the cloth guild, for the Baptistry. In addition to other responsibilities, these guilds oversaw the establishment and maintenance of the chapel that sang for services at these two institutions, as well as later at Santissima Anunnziata. A chapel was established as early as 1438, although polyphonic music had been performed at the cathedral for at least thirty years prior. It is believed that the Medici were responsible for, or at least involved in, the creation and continuation of the polyphonic chapel in Florence.

Cosimo de' Medici is credited with arranging the creation of the chapel, not because of documents supporting this, but rather because his name does not appear in any of the documents surrounding the chapel's founding, but as such a prominent figure, it seems unlikely he would not have been involved in the process. Further, when the chapel was disbanded at some point between 1458 and 1464, Cosimo was given the authority to reestablish a chapel with his own funds. During the period of Savonarola's influence, from about 1493–1498, the chapel was disbanded again. However, polyphonic music was returned to the cathedral soon after Savonarola's arrest; records show musicians were engaged to perform by April 27, 1498. The chapel was reestablished by December 1, 1501. The chapel was restored in 1501 during the Medici's exile from Florence. It is clear, then, that other forces in Florence besides the Medici were concerned with the chapel. In addition to patronage of the chapels, certain of the guilds also provided support for some of the confraternities in Florence, which performed laude.

==== Private ====
Outside of Florence, most major centers had a court and a system of nobility, such as the Dukes of Ferrara, the Este, the Sforza in Milan, etc. In these cases, the ruler kept his own musicians for his personal use, for military purposes or for religious services, or simply entertainment. However, in Florence, such a court did not exist until the establishment of the Medici as Dukes of Florence in 1532. Wealthy Florentine families, such as the Strozzi family, employed musicians for private use, but without the same level of display or extravagance that would be found in ducal or princely courts. Private patronage also appears in carnival songs. The city's inhabitants themselves served as patrons of certain kinds of music, such as the bench singers, or cantimpanca. A particular singer would often have a regular time and place for his performances – some even had sheets printed with the lyrics to the songs they would perform; these performers were also known for their ability to improvise. Florentines also patronized music through their bequests, through which they arranged to have laude and masses sung on their behalf during services held by the various Florentine laudesi companies.

==== Church ====
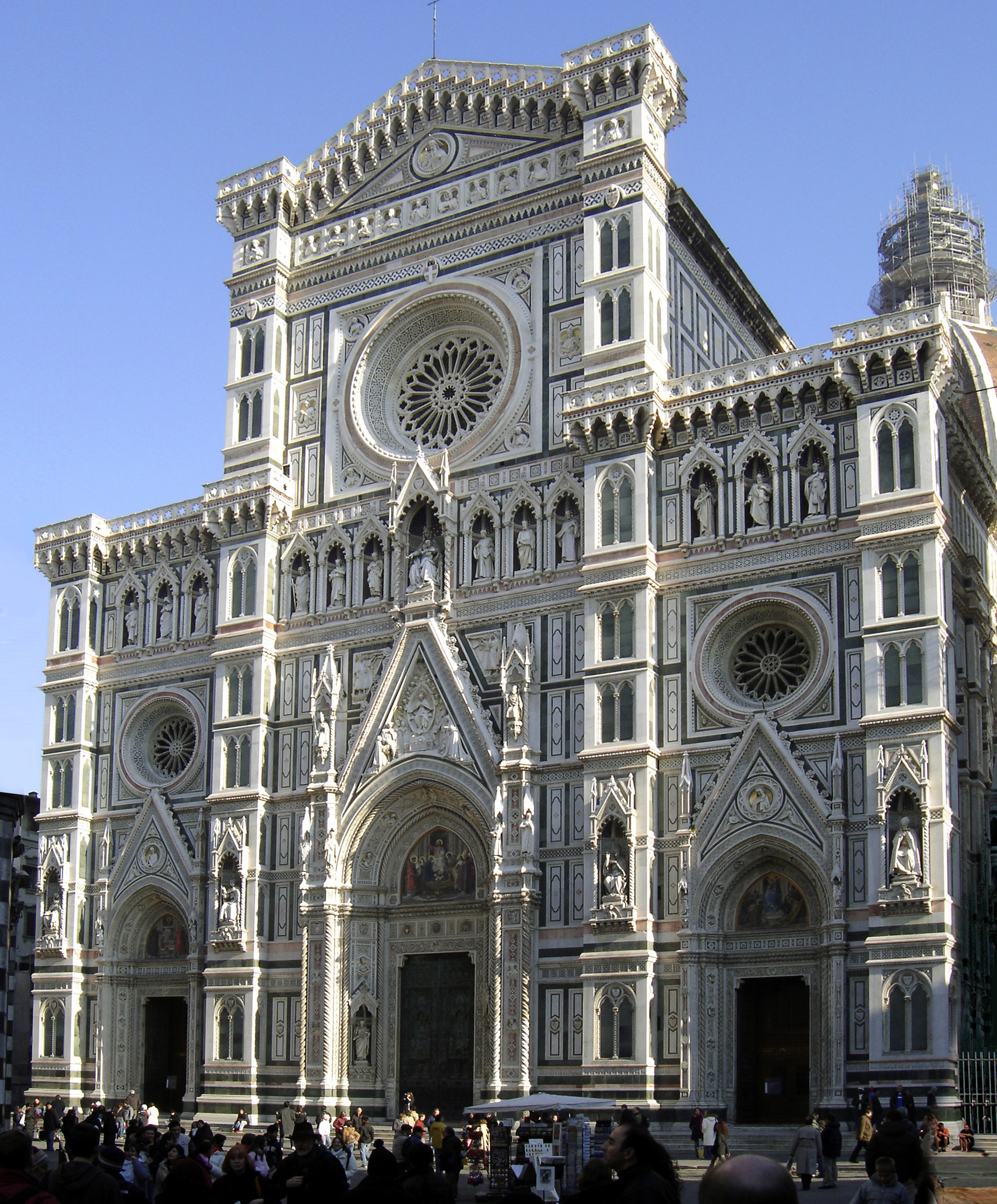
Florence Cathedral

The church itself supported some musicians through benefices. Musicians tried to attain the best benefices during their careers, as well as gathering more than one. In this way, musicians could guarantee their continued financial support. However, because benefices included an ecclesiastical post, married musicians could not benefit from them. Also, political turmoil, such as war or the seizure of lands, could interfere with the payment of benefices to a recipient. Church patronage of music can also be seen in the musical training given to boys who were educated at ecclesiastical institutions. They received education in grammar and music in return for singing with the chapel when needed.

==== Patronage and the Medici ====
The connection between the Medici and music patronage in Florence is a complex one. Although there is no evidence that the Medici directly paid any of the Florentine public musicians, it is possible that the Medici had an arrangement with the pifferi whereby the group performed for the Medici without having to request their services through normal channels. A similar belief is held in the relationship between the Medici and the chapel; the Medici, beginning with Cosimo, may have given the chapel singers financial support in addition to the pay they received from the Cathedral and the Baptistery. Regardless of whether the family did so, it is clear that certain of the Medici influenced the selection of musicians for the chapels at the Cathedral and Baptistry, as well as playing a role in bringing musicians to Florence and, in some cases, finding them financial support.

The various types of patronage in Florence, then, most often were implemented as a means of bringing honor to either the city itself, its religious institutions, or both. Private patronage also served as a reflection of the patron's own wealth and standing. Despite the differences in government between Florence and the courts at Ferrara, Milan, and elsewhere, the motivations behind the patronage of music were quite similar. Patrons, whether dukes or guilds men, used music and musicians to demonstrate either their own wealth and prestige, or that of their city or institution. The groups of musicians who represented the honor of the city or cathedral not only had to exist, but their quality reflected on the city as well. For this reason, patrons sought to employ the best musicians, and competition over singers or other performers was common.

== Song and instrumental music ==
A Florentine Chansonnier from the Time of Lorenzo the Magnificent

A Florentine Chansonnier from the Time of Lorenzo the Magnificent (Biblioteca Nazionale Centrale, compiled in Florence, c. 1490–1491) opens with Johannes Martini's work, and other works by him regularly alternates with those of Heinrich Isaac in the first nineteenth items. The opening repertoire has been interpreted as a "contest" between the two composers. Isaac has been long regarded as a composer with strong ties to Florence and the Medici from the mid-1480s, whereas there is no surviving evidence connecting Martini with Florence. Martini, indeed, was a prominent court musician in Ferrara, employed by the Este from 1473 until his death in the late 1490s.

Martini and Florence

Perhaps Martini's music could have reached Florence during the 1480s. Martini traveled to Rome in 1487. During that trip, he could have stopped in Florence, because the city served as a normal stopover along the route from Ferrara to Rome. Martini's brother Piero joined the choir of the Florentine Cathedral and Santissima Annunziata from 1486 to 1487. Martini's trip to Rome could easily have included a stopover in Florence to visit his brother.

Connections between Ferrara and Florence

Ferrara-Florence connections are supported by the shared repertoire between Florentine and contemporary Ferrarese manuscript, Cas. Cas is a major selection of what was available in Ferrara in the 1470s, compiled around 1480, about a decade earlier than 229. Despite a periodic gap between the two, a larger number of concordances suggest the spread of common material in the two important centers from which the manuscripts originated. In the case of Martini, it is not surprising that Martini's eight works in the opening contest section of Fl 229 also appear in Cas.

The two cities have a long-standing history of musical competition. Ferrara served as a place for recruitment of singers for the Baptistry in Florence (established in 1438). Throughout the eras of Lorenzo de'Medici (1466–1492) and Ercole I d'Este (1471–1505), musicians travelled and forged the ties to both cities. For instance, the singer Cornelio di Lorenzo in Ferrara moved to Florence in 1482, where he was serving as a member of Santissima Annunziata. He also maintained his position as a musical agent for Ercole. After his return to Ferrara, he continued contact with Florence.

La Martinella

Another example of such a connection is compositions of Martini and Isaac, entitled La Martinella. Both compositions are textless, and perhaps originally conceived as instrumental pieces, called "free fantasia." The title probably refers to the composer himself, Martini.

It is quite plausible that Isaac reworked Martini's Martinella for his setting of the same title. This is supported by the chronological relationship between the two pieces as well as shared thematic material and structure. Martini's work is written no later than the mid-1470s. Isaac had arrived in Florence around 1485 when Maritni's was probably circulated in the city. Isaac's was written no earlier than the mid-1480s.

Comparing these two compositions, Martini's Martinella consists of two nearly equal sections, like the majority of his secular works. The first section opens with an expansive duet between superius and tenor, followed by a shorter duet for tenor and contratenor. Next, a tutti for all three voices is interrupted by a series of short imitative duets. The short characteristic phrase, indeed, is one of the main stylistic traits of Martini. Isaac seems to extensively borrow material from his model, but recomposes it. He reuses the melodic material from Martini in the opening and concluding sections as well as several places of his setting, yet with motivic elaboration. For instance, Isaac's opening phrase is based on the initial material of Martini, expanding the initial duet into three-part texture in imitation. In addition, a series of short motives is exchanged between various pairs of voices. This is a similar technique to that which Martini used in the same part of the form, although Isaac did not borrow any explicit melodic material from his model.

He also preserves the structural proportion of Martini, including the same number of measures and nearly equal two sections. In the first section just after the opening phrase, particularly, Isaac follows the sequence of two duets, tutti, alternation between short motives, and tutti. The technique of short motives in imitation is also indebted to Martini's. It is likely that Martini stimulated Isaac's interest in reworking three-part polyphonic instrumental music through Martinella.

The opening section of the Florentine manuscript may suggest the interrelationships between Martini and Isaac, and by extension, between Ferrara and Florence. The link of Martini and Isaac is strongly suggestive through the composition Martinella. It is not coincidence that Isaac chose Martinella's piece as a model for one of his pieces. During his visit, Martini may have influenced Isaac with regard to the compositional techniques, styles, and procedure portrayed in his Martinella. The two may have worked together, which in turn is possibly reflected in the impressive opening section, alternating the works between the two.

=== Humanism and music ===
Given this environment of collaboration among institutions and classes of society, it is worth considering the relationship between music and Renaissance humanism, one of the primary intellectual strands active in Quattrocento Florence. Humanism arose as a literary movement in Italy during the late 13th century and flowered in the 15th, particularly in the city of Florence. Humanists were initially identified as professors or students of the studia humanitatis, the curriculum of core subjects that formed the foundation of the humanists' education; these included grammar (i.e. Latin), rhetoric, poetry, history, and moral philosophy. Classicism was the basis for their studies: humanists drew on the discoveries and revival of ancient Greek and Latin authors and attempted to imitate them in content, style, and form.

By 1600, humanism had come to affect nearly every discipline-every discipline, that is, except music. The common view has been that music lagged behind other fields such as the plastic arts, and, indeed, the application of humanism to music has been the subject of considerable debate. Only a few fragments of ancient Greek music were known during the 15th century, and, as very few humanists comprehended the notation, the sounding music of the ancients could not be revived in the same way as their literature. Yet there are a number of ways in which music can be understood as humanist.

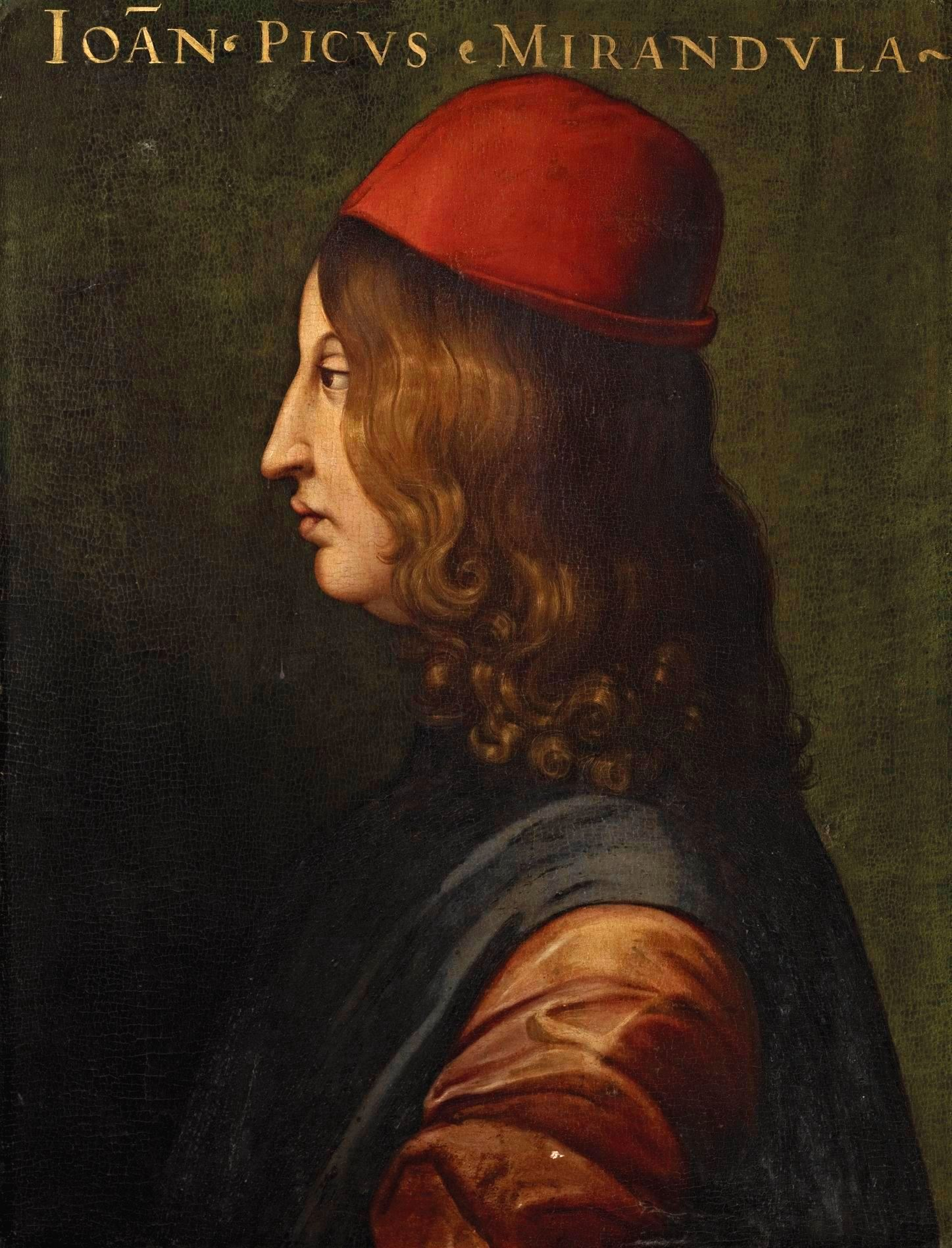
Portrait of Pico della Mirandola by Cristofano dell'Altissimo, Uffizi Gallery, Florence

Although the music of the ancients could not be recovered, their theories and attitudes about it could. Due in part to the collection efforts by Florentines such as Niccolo Niccoli (c. 1364–1437) and Pico della Mirandola (1463–94), much classical Greek and Latin music theory was known and studied during the 15th century. Humanists noted that the ancient authors had ascribed powerful effects to music and advocated that contemporary music too should move the affections of listeners. To this end, 15th-century theorists tried to understand the way in which ancient Greek music was constructed, including the concepts of mode and harmony, and apply it to modern music. The metaphor of the harmony in music as a representation of the universal harmony between man and cosmos or between body and soul was a particularly appealing one, prominently figuring in the writings of humanists, including the Florentine Neoplatonist Marsilio Ficino (1433–99).

Another manner of defining humanistic music regards a union of word and tone. One of the ways in which humanism exerted its influence on other disciplines was to encourage greater attention to clarity or elegance of style. This led to experiments with music that mirrored a text's syllable lengths, accents, and meaning. Guillaume Dufay (1397–1474), who spent time in Florence in the 1430s and wrote the motet "Mirandas parit" for the city, includes classical subjects and praise for Florence in a Latin text that employs a quantitative meter-all recognizable characteristics of humanistic writing. Moreover, Dufay uses a number of musical devices to explain and amplify the meaning of the text, in much the same way as a humanistic orator would employ rhetorical figures to decorate a speech.

Finally, there is the issue of the type of music that the humanists themselves cultivated. Very little of the literature by the humanists mentions contemporary art music. It does, however, include descriptions of an improvisatory tradition, particularly the singing of poetry to the accompaniment of a lyre or other stringed instrument. Such accounts typically take an effusive tone, calling on classical images of Orpheus or the Muses and emphasizing the rhetorical nature of the performance.

== Venues and activities ==
A wave of urban expansion in the 1860s led to the construction of a number of theaters in Florence. Currently, the sites, activities, and musical groups is impressive. They include:

- Teatro Comunale, seat of the Orchestra del Maggio Musicale Fiorentino and the main site of concerts in the series of the Maggio Musicale Fiorentino, a music festival the name of which recalls the presumed folk music festivals of the Middle Ages that are speculated to have been one of the sources for early opera
- Teatro della Pergola
- the Fiesole School of Music (Scuola di Musica di Fiesole), open to all ages—an attempt to encourage amateur and semi-professional musical activity
- Centro di Ricerca e di Sperimentazione per la Didattica Musicale
- Teatro Verdi, seat of the Tuscany Symphony Orchestra
- Teatro Goldoni
- Luigi Cherubini music conservatory, also home to an impressive Museum of Musical Instruments
- the music manuscript collection in the National Central Library
- a great number of churches that host musical performances.

Furthermore, the town of Empoli in the province hosts the Busoni Center for Musical Studies, and Fiesole has an ancient Roman theatre that puts an annual summer music festival.

== See also ==
- Music of Tuscany
