= Marco Lastri =

Italian polymath

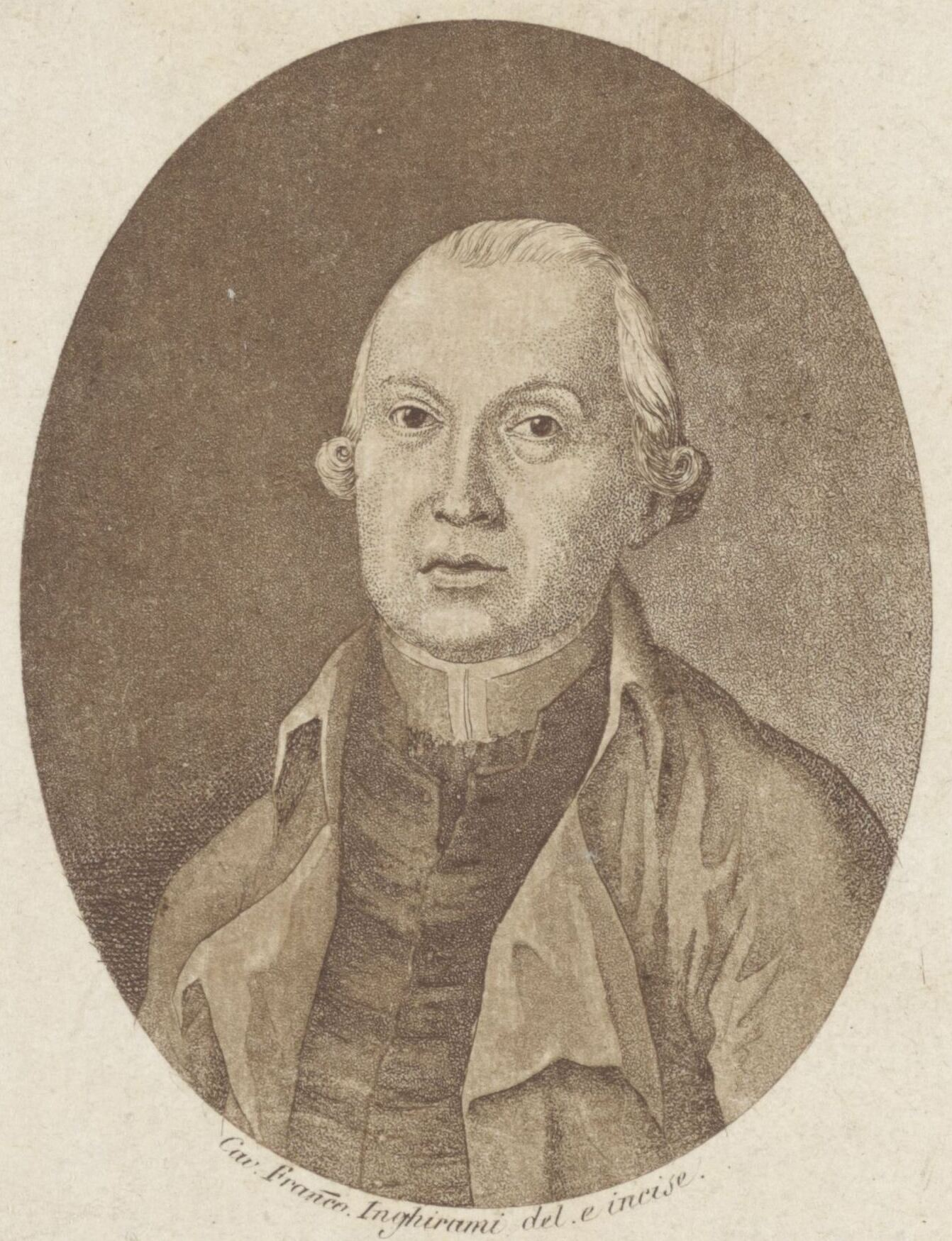
Engraved portrait of Marco Lastri by Francesco Inghirami

Marco Lastri (6 March 1731 – 24 December 1811) was an eclectic and polymath writer, active in Florence, region of Tuscany, Italy.

== Biography ==
Born to in the quartiere of Santa Croce, Florence, to a family of limited means, his education led towards an ecclesiastical career, studying at the Collegio Eugeniano affiliated with the cathedral for nine years. After becoming a priest, he attended the seminary of the diocese, where he met the fellow scholar Giovanni Maria Lampredi, future professor at the University of Pisa for canon law and public rights. Obtaining in 1756 a degree from the Collegio Teologico dello Studio Fiorentino. That year he published epithalamic sonnets celebrating the marriage of G. Dini and the marchesa Teresa Gerini.

In 1759 he was granted a position at the Pieve dei San Giovanni e Lorenzo at Signa, and he pursued in their archives: Memorie appartenenti alla vita ed al culto della Beata Giovanna da Signa (1761). With the arrival of the progressive Habsburg-Lorraine Grand-Dukes, Lastri joined a large academic, multivolume effort, under their patronage, to eulogize famous Tuscans. For example, Lastri wrote the biography of Machiavelli for the series. He published some criticism of the contemporary writer Giovanni Lami (1697–1770), founder of the Novelle Letterarie.

In 1772, Lastri returned to Florence to a local ecclesiastical position associated with the cathedral. He became a member of the Accademia dei Georgofili in 1770, and of the Accademia della Crusca and the Accademia dell'Agricoltura of Padua in 1773. Agricultural sciences remained an interest for him for years. In 1774, he published a popularly successful work on agronomic theories and economies abiding in Europe.

In 1776, he published a six-volume set of observations on cultural monuments and buildings in Florence, which proved as a guide for the sophisticated foreign travelers. The work, titled L'Osservatore fiorentino sugli edifizj della sua patria, with the help of Giuseppe del Rosso, continued to be published for some decades.

In 1781, he caused displeasure of the Grand Duke Peter Leopold for publishing some satirical comments in a gazette published by Giovanni Allegrini. His enthusiasm for writing never diminished, writing on diverse subjects such as culture and economics. In the 19th century, he continued to publish works on agricultural topics, translations, and religious works. He died in Sant'Ilario a Settimo in 1811.

== Major works ==
- Rules for landowners or Regole per i padroni dei poderi verso i contadini per proprio vantaggio e di loro, con dei Avvisi ai medesimi sulla loro salute. Aggiuntavi alcuni pensieri di un dilettante d'agricoltura sopra il problema di rivestire di piante, e coltivar le montagne spogliate. rovasi in fine de' quesiti fatti ad un dilettante d'agricoltura pistojese sulla coltivazione delle patate, e risposte ai medesimi; e una memoria sull'utilita de' cannetti, e sul metodo di piantarli e custodirli. del proposto Lastri autore delli dodici Calendarj ossia Corso completo di agricoltura pratica. Venice: Printed in Graziosi, Sant'Apollinare, 1793.
- Elogi degli uomini illustri toscani. 1763
- L'osservatore fiorentino sugli edifizi della sua patria; printed by Giuseppe and Pietro Allegrini, 1776, Florence.
- Calendario del vangatore nel quale restano descritte le faccende mensuali del vangatore scritto dal proposto Lastri, produzione che deve essere sommamente cara agli agricoltori. Venice: Printed in Graziosi, Sant'Apollinare, 1793.
- Calendario del pecorajo nel quale restano descritte le faccende mensuali del pecorajo scritto dal proposto Lastri: trattato necessario a chiunque nelle loro campagne vuol trar profitto da questo ricco ramo d'industria nel quale tutto è trattato diffusamente specialmente in ciò che riguarda le Lane. Venice: Printed in Graziosi, Sant'Apollinare, 1793.
- Castagnajo's calendar or Calendario del castagnajo nel quale restano descritte le faccende mensuali del castagnajo. Scritto dal proposto Lastri descrizione utilissima nella quale s'indica l'unico mezzo di far propagare una pianta di tanta utilita per alimentare la gente della campagna, articolo dell'agricoltura in molti luoghi dell'Italia trascurato; con infine la regola per macinar le castagne, e la maniera di conservarne la farina. Venice: Printed in Graziosi, Sant'Apollinare.
- Calendario del maremmano nel quale restano descritte le faccende mensuali del lavoratore maremmano pubblicato dal proposto Lastri libretto utilissimo, che insegna la vera maniera di far la sementa, e le altre faccende sino alla tiratura e riponitura de'grani.Venice: Printed in Graziosi, Sant'Apollinare, 1793
- Veterinary and georgic recipes or Ricette veterinarie e georgiche / raccolte per bene dei proprietari delle terre, e dei contadini dal proposto Lastri autore dei dodici calendarj, ossia Corso completo di agricoltura pratica. Venice: Printed in Graziosi, Sant'Apollinare, 1793.

== Note ==
- Paoli, Maria Pia (2004). "LASTRI, Marco". Dizionario Biografico degli Italiani (in Italian). Vol. 63: Labroca–Laterza. Rome: Istituto dell'Enciclopedia Italiana. ISBN 978-88-12-00032-6.
- Paraphrase from Italian Wikipedia entry
