= Lampredi =

Lampredi is a surname. Notable people with the surname include:

- Giovanni Maria Lampredi (1731–1793), Italian jurist and scholar
- Urbano Lampredi (1761–1838), Italian scholar, journalist, and politician
- Aurelio Lampredi (1917–1989), Italian automobile and aircraft engine designer
