= Maria Kouznetsova (violinist) =

French-Russian musician (born 1991)

Maria Kouznetsova Мария Кузнецова
- Born: 1 November 1991 (age 35); Ryazan, Russia
- Genre: Classical music
- Instrument: Carlo Antonio Testore violin (1707)

Maria Kouznetsova (Russian: Мария Кузнецова, born 1 November 1991) is a French‒Russian violinist. In September 2014 Kouznetsova won the Guang Ya Chengdu International Violin Competition in China.

== Early life ==
Kouznetsova was born in Ryazan, Russia in 1991 to her mother Irina Vorobieva, a pianist. She attended Ryazan Music School No.5 before moving from Russia to France in 1998. Kouznetsova speaks English, French, Italian and Russian.

== Musical success ==
In 2006 she won the International Music Competition Luigi Nono in Venaria Reale, Turin. In February 2007 Kouznetsova took second place in the Moscow International David Oistrakh Violin Competition after the first-prize was not awarded. For the Moscow performance, she played a 1991-violin made by Ukrainian Stefan Melnyk. In December 2007 Kouznetsova competed in the Adriatic Music Competition in Ancona, Italy, winning the European Union of Music Competitions for Youth "Arts for Music Prize" as well as first-place.

As of 2007 she was playing using a 1905-violin made by Riccardo Antoniazzi on loan from the Fondazione Pro Canale Onlus and Kouznetsova used a violin bow constructed by Giovanni Lucchi, a bow maker from Italy. On 1 January 2008 she played at the Teatro del Maggio Musicale Fiorentino New Year's Day concert and had been studying under Pavel Vernikov and Oleksandr Semchuk at the Fiesole School of Music at the time. During 2008 Kouznetsova was playing a 1778 violin constructed by the Gagliano family of luthiers on loan from the Fiesole School of Music. In late-2010 she began using a bow constructed for her by Daniel Tobias Navea Vera. In a recital on 29 September 2010 the custom-made Navea Vera bow was compared to a bow made by Dominique Peccatte in 1840. On 9 April 2011 she performed at the Museo del tessuto (it) in Prato, Italy.

During 2012 Kouznetsova was studying at the Queen Elisabeth Music Chapel in Waterloo, Belgium under Augustin Dumay. As of 2013 she was studying at the Conservatorium van Amsterdam in the Netherlands under Ilya Grubert. The 2008-sonatina "According to Gurney" by Xander Hunfeld was performed by Charles Neidich, Kouznetsova and Martijn Willers in 2013. By 2014 she was playing using a 1707-violin made by Carlo Antonio Testore on loan from the Conservatorium van Amsterdam.

In December 2014 Kouznetsova played as part of the "Intercontinental Ensemble" group. By January 2015 she was playing a violin custom-made by Belgian violin maker Fabien Gram. On 6 March 2015 Alexandra Nepomnyashchaya and Kouznetsova played the opening concert of the Zaandijk Pianoforte Festival in the Netherlands. In June 2015 she was scheduled to compete at the XII International Violin Competition Pablo Sarasate in Spain. In 2016 Kouznetsova reached the second round of the Carl Nielsen international music competition held with the Odense Symphony Orchestra in Denmark. During 2017 the Hattori Foundation awarded Kouznetsova a prize along with cellist Jamal Aliyev and other violinists. In 2017 she was awarded "Gold (with distinction)" in the Manhattan International Music Competition.

Kouznetsova was deputy concertmaster of the Netherlands Philharmonic Orchestra, before moving in December 2021 to become deputy concertmaster of the Antwerp Symphony Orchestra, under conductor Elim Chan.
