= Teatro del Maggio Musicale Fiorentino =

Italian concert hall

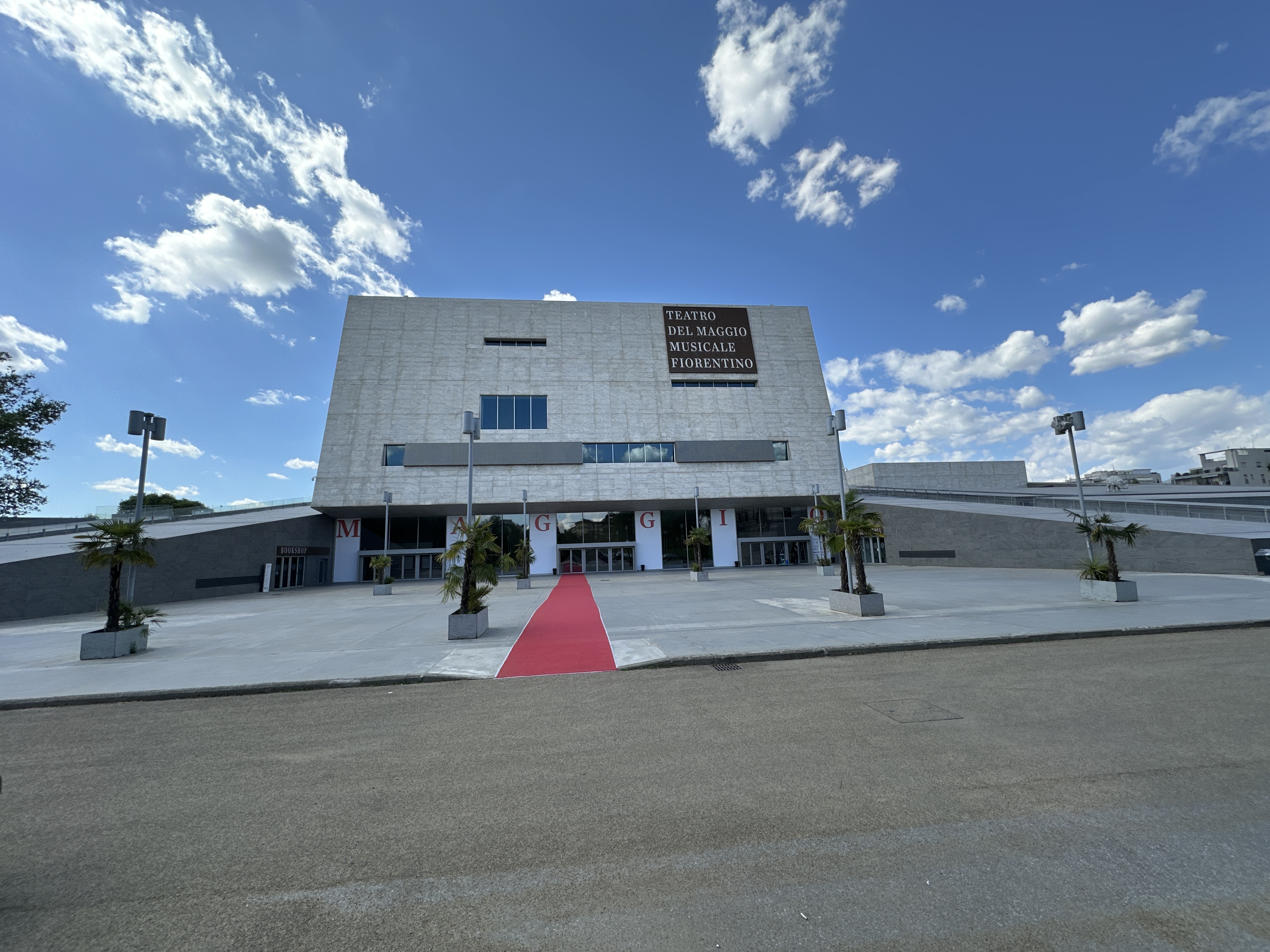
- Interactive map of the Teatro del Maggio Musicale Fiorentino area

General information
- Location: Florence, Italy, Piazza Vittorio Gui 1
- Coordinates: 43°46′43″N 11°14′08″E
- Opened: 21 December 2011 (Sala Grande); 21 December 2021 (Sala Zubin Mehta)

Design and construction
- Architect: Paolo Desideri
- Architecture firm: ABDR Architects

Website
- Official website

Il Teatro del Maggio Musicale Fiorentino is a theatre in Florence, Italy. Replacing the Teatro Comunale, it is the primary venue for the Maggio Musicale Fiorentino festival and home to the Orchestra del Maggio Musicale Fiorentino.

The complex includes the Sala Grande, an opera theatre with 1,800 seats; the Sala Zubin Mehta, an auditorium for symphony concerts with an adjustable capacity of 500 to 1,100 seats; and the potential for open-air performances on the roof for up to 2,000 spectators. There are further spaces for orchestra, chorus, and staging rehearsals.

== See also ==
- Theatres in Florence
- Music of Florence
- Parco delle Cascine
