= Sherry Zannoth =

American operatic soprano (1946–2012)

- Zannoth in 1981
- Born: February 15, 1946; Detroit, Michigan, U.S.
- Died: November 20, 2012 (aged 66); New York City, U.S.
- Education: Oberlin College; Eastman School of Music
- Occupations: Operatic soprano; Academic teacher
- Organizations: Theater Bremen; New York City Opera; New Arts Ensemble; Ithaca College; Memphis State University

Sherry Zannoth (February 15, 1946 – November 20, 2012), also known by her married name Sherry Zannoth Cavalli, was an American operatic soprano and voice teacher.

Born in Detroit and raised in Pontiac, Michigan, she was educated as an opera singer at Oberlin College and the Eastman School of Music. She had an active performance career in concerts and operas from the late 1960s into the 2000s. In 1971 she was a founding member of the New Arts Ensemble (NAE), a professional chamber music group based in Rochester, New York. In 1976 she performed the title role in Puccini's Madama Butterfly for Opera Cleveland's inaugural production. Some of the other American companies she performed with during her career included the New York City Opera, Metropolitan Opera, Seattle Opera, Toledo Opera, Charlotte Opera, and the Kentucky Opera among others.

On the international stage Zannoth was a principal soprano at Theater Bremen from 1984 to 1994. She also performed in operas at the Teatro de Cristóbal Colón in Colombia, the Wexford Festival Opera in Ireland, the Hong Kong Opera, and at other theaters in Germany. In addition to Butterfly, other roles she sang frequently during her career included Mozart roles such as Countess Almaviva in The Marriage of Figaro and Donna Anna in Don Giovanni, Micaëla in Bizet's Carmen, both Mimì and Musetta in Puccini's La bohème, and Violetta in Verdi's La traviata. She taught voice on the music faculties of Ithaca College and Memphis State University. She also worked as a sacred music vocalist for many years at both Rutgers Presbyterian Church and Hebrew Tabernacle of Washington Heights in New York City. She died in 2012 at the age of 66.

== Early life and education ==
The daughter of George L. Zannoth and Dawn Wright Zannoth, Sherry L. Zannoth was born on February 15, 1946 in Detroit. Her father worked for General Motors. Her great-grandfather was a voice teacher and her great-grandmother was his accompanist. She was educated at Waterford Township High School (now demolished) in Pontiac, Michigan. In her early childhood, she began her training as a pianist and did not pursue studies as a vocalist until she was a teenager.

After graduating from high school, Zannoth studied at the Oberlin Conservatory of Music in Ohio where she attended on a voice scholarship. While a student at Oberlin she studied singing with Helen Hodam. She was the soprano soloist in the school's performances of Haydn's Nelson Mass which were conducted by Robert Shaw. In her junior year, she performed her first opera role, portraying Fiordiligi in a student production of Mozart's Così fan tutte. In the summer of 1968 she portrayed the title role in Oberlin's production of The Merry Widow with tenor Barry Busse as Danilo and Andrew Meltzer conducting. Other parts she performed with the Oberlin Players that summer on tour to Massachusetts included Mabel in Gilbert and Sullivan's The Pirates of Penzance, Elsie Maynard in The Yeomen of the Guard, and Mary Stone in Douglas Moore's The Devil and Daniel Webster. She returned to Oberlin's summer opera theatre program in 1969, performing Micaëla in Bizet's Carmen and Mimì in Puccini's La bohème (conducted by Leonard Slatkin).

After graduating from Oberlin in 1968, Zannoth attended graduate school at the Eastman School of Music at the University of Rochester on a voice scholarship. In November 1968 she portrayed Giorgetta in Eastman's production of Puccini's Il tabarro. In March 1969 she sang in a program of experimental music at the Eastman Theatre referred to as spatial music, performing as the soprano soloist in the premiere of Henry Brant's Millennium I. She performed the work with Eastman's brass ensemble whose members were spread out throughout the theatre in order to spatially surround the audience. In 1970 she represented Eastman at a composer's symposium in Montreal, Canada. In February 1970 she performed the role of Dido in Eastman's production of Purcell's Dido and Aeneas. In December 1970 she performed text in the Aztec, Mayan, and Quechuan languages as the soprano soloist in Alberto Ginastera's Cantata para America Majica at the Eastman Theatre. In January 1971, she was soprano soloist in Eastman's performances of the Verdi Requiem.

Zannoth graduated from Eastman with a master's degree in vocal performance in 1972. In 1970, she was regional finalist in the Metropolitan Opera National Council Auditions. In 1973, she married Vincent Cavalli. That marriage ended in divorce, as did a later second marriage.

== Performance career ==
=== Early career: 1967–1976 ===
Zannoth began her career on the concert stage in the 1960s with her early performances including singing the soprano solos in Handel's Messiah with the Cleveland Orchestra in a concert at Thiel College and in performances with the symphony and chorus of Muskingum College in 1967. On December 7, 1968, she performed the world premiere of Warren Benson's song cycle for soprano and band Shadow Wood at the convention for the Music Educator's Association of Monroe County, New York, a work she later repeated at the 1969 New York State School Music Association conference in Buffalo, New York and with the Eastman Wind Ensemble at the 1972 convention of the College Band Directors National Association. In November 1969, she was the soprano soloist in the Rochester Oratorio Society's presentation of Haydn's The Creation with conductor Theodore Hollenbach and the Rochester Philharmonic Orchestra. She repeated this work with the Corning Philharmonic Society in April 1970, and at Muskingum College in 1971.

In 1971, Zannoth was a founding member of the New Arts Ensemble (NAE), a professional chamber music group based in Rochester that was dedicated to performing new music in seasons of chamber music concerts. That year she performed the world premiere of Joseph Packales's An Allegory of War with the NAE. In April 1971, she made her professional opera debut with the Opera Theatre of Rochester (OTR) in the title role (Cio-Cio-San) of Puccini's Madama Butterfly with Richard Taylor as Pinkerton and conductor Taavo Virkhaus leading the Rochester Philharmonic. That same month she was the soprano soloist in Bach's St John Passion at the Rochester Bach Festival.

In May 1971, Zannoth performed at Temple B'rith Kodesh as the soprano soloist in the first performance in the United States of Volunio Gallichi and Francesco Drei's ceremonial music written for the 1786 dedication of the Siena Synagogue. In July 1971, she sang with Diane Curry in a program of Rodgers and Hammerstein music with the Chautauqua Symphony Orchestra (CSO), and soon after sang a program of music by Richard Strauss with the CSO. In August 1971, she performed in Ibert's Angélique with Chautauqua Opera. In 1972, she was the guest soloist in the Rochester Philharmonic's concert "Ecology in Music". In March 1972, she performed Schubert's "The Shepherd on the Rock" and the aria "L'amerò, sarò costante" from Mozart's Il re pastore with the Rochester Philharmonic, and performed in concerts with the NAE at Hobart and William Smith Colleges and Xerox Auditorium. With the NAE she performed Schoenberg's monodrama Pierrot lunaire in May 1972. In June and July 1972, she performed two concerts of Italian opera arias in return engagements with the CSO: one led by conductor Walter Hendl and the other by Louis Lane.

In the summer of 1973, Zannoth appeared as Cio-Cio-San with the Singers Theater of Mahopac and subsequently as Mimì and Micaëla with that company. In November 1973, she performed a recital at Marymount College, Tarrytown with repertoire that included Felix Mendelssohn's Lieblingsplätzchen, lieder by Gustav Mahler, chansons by Gabriel Faure, and arias from The Rake's Progress. In May 1974, she starred in a production of Carlisle Floyd's first opera, Slow Dusk, at the Emelin Theatre, and that same month won the East-West singing competition. In October 1974, she gave a recital at Milligan College, and the following December she performed at Carnegie Hall. In January 1975, she returned to the OTR in the role of Micaëla with Hilda Harris as Carmen.

In 1975, Zannoth became a member of Goldovsky Opera Theater with whom she performed the roles of Serafina in Donizetti's The Night Bell and Lia in Debussy's The Prodigal Son at the University of Michigan's Power Center for the Performing Arts. That same year she portrayed Cio-Cio-San with the Music Theatre of Ohio and the Countess in The Marriage of Figaro with the Performing Arts Society of Westchester. In 1976, she returned to the OTR as Donna Elvira in Don Giovanni and portrayed Cio-Cio-San with the Wichita Symphony Orchestra, the Kentucky Opera and Opera Cleveland. It was notably the latter company's inaugural performance. In February 1976, she portrayed Anna Maurrant in Kurt Weill's Street Scene at the Manhattan School of Music, with The New York Times critic Raymond Ericson praising her performance as "particularly well handled". With clarinetist Larry Guy and pianist Dan Franklin Smith she sang Ned Rorem's song cycle Ariel at Weill Recital Hall in March 1976.

=== Later career ===
In January 1977, Zannoth portrayed Donna Anna to John Reardon's Don Giovanni and Jacque Trussel's Don Ottavio with the Lansing Opera Guild (later the Opera Company of Mid-Michigan) at Michigan State University. On March 19, 1977, she made her debut at the New York City Opera (NYCO) as Musetta in La bohème. Others in the cast, which was repeated the following season in New York, included Mariana Nicolesco as Mimì, Lando Bartolini as Rodolfo, and William Justus as Marcello. Other roles she sang with the NYCO during her career included Nedda in Leoncavallo's Pagliacci (1977, with Herman Malamood as Canio) and the Second Lady in Mozart's The Magic Flute (1978). An NYCO performance of Pagliacci with Zannoth was recorded live for national radio broadcast on November 27, 1977. In 1979 she portrayed Javotte in the NYCO's production of Massenet's Manon with Catherine Malfitano in the title role.

In June 1977, Zannoth returned to Carnegie Hall to perform Ivana Marburger Themmen's song cycle Mystic Trumpeter in a concert sponsored by the National Association of Composers, USA. She toured with the NYCO to the Dorothy Chandler Pavilion in Los Angeles in December 1977. Los Angeles Times critic Lewis Segal stated the following in his review:

Chief novelty in the Saturday cast was Sherry Zannoth's Musetta, depicted as a woman of considerable intelligence in complete control of the spitfire facade adopted for Alcindoro. Singing the waltz song with unexpected simplicity, Zannoth saved the flouncing for her shoe charade and instead demonstrated the warmth and luster she can bring to music often tarnished with insensitivity.

Zannoth concluded the year of 1977 performing as soprano soloist in Handel's Messiah with the Oratorio Society of New York at Carnegie Hall. She then resumed performing with NYCO La bohème cast in 1978 when David Rendall took over the role of Rodolfo. She sang Musetta in Lansing in 1978 with Nadine Secunde as Mimì, and that same year performed the role of Donna Anna to Claude Corbeil's Don Giovanni at the Charlotte Opera. In the summer of 1978, she went on a concert tour with the New Jersey Symphony which was then led by conductor Thomas Michalak. After this she returned to Rochester to once again appear as Butterfly and appeared as Micaëla in Carmen in a production in New Jersey. She was also a featured soloists with the Erie Philharmonic in 1978.

In 1979, Zannoth repeated the role of Micaëla at the Toledo Opera with Ann Howard in the title role, and returned to Donna Anna for her debut with the Seattle Opera with Roderick Ristow as Don Giovanni. That same year she performed again with Opera Cleveland as Rosalinde in Die Fledermaus in what The Cleveland Press described as earning her "show-stopping applause". In March 1979, she gave a recital in the rotunda of the Michigan State Capitol building. In June 1979, she returned to Lansing to appear as Gilda in Verdi's Rigoletto with Ferdinand Radovan in the title role. In November 1979, she portrayed Konstanze in Mozart's Die Entführung aus dem Serail at the Jackson Municipal Auditorium with Opera/South.

In 1980, Zannoth performed with the Asolo Opera (now the Sarasota Opera) in Sarasota, Florida as Butterfly, and sang Musetta with both the Spokane Symphony and Opera Memphis. That same year she portrayed Donna Anna with Mobile Opera with the Mobile Press-Register praising her performance as "graceful and commanding", and highlighting her "dramatic range and vocal strength". In the summer of 1980 she appeared as Countess Almaviva at the Glimmerglass Opera with Enrique Baquerizo as the Count. In October 1980, she performed the title role of Violetta in Verdi's La traviata with the Grand Rapids Symphony at DeVos Performance Hall.

Zannoth returned to Rochester as Rosalinde in January 1981 and following month returned to the NYCO as Micaëla. She made her debut at the Metropolitan Opera (Met) in New York City on March 26, 1981, in the minor role of one of the whores in Will's Rise and Fall of the City of Mahagonny. Her only role at the Met, she performed it in the 1981 production and its 1984 revival. In 1982, she performed Micaëla with Opera Omaha, Antonia in Offenbach's The Tales of Hoffmann with Lake George Opera, and was the soprano soloist in Rossini's Petite messe solennelle with the Cecilia Chamber Singers at Harvard University's Sanders Theatre. She was the featured soloist for the opening of the International Symphony Orchestra's 26th season in November 1982, with conductor Brian Jackson leading the concert. In December 1982, she performed with the University Musical Society as a soloist in the Messiah in a concert at the University of Michigan in which she shared the soprano solos with a young Bejun Mehta, then a boy soprano. She ended the year giving a recital at The Phillips Collection art museum in Washington D.C. with pianist John Wisnunt. The Washington Post review of her interpretation of Mozart's "Misera, dove son" and hugo Wolf's lieder was described as "lively and dramatic", with praise for her ability to give "space and tension to the phrasing".

In 1983, Zannoth portrayed Amelia in Verdi's Un ballo in maschera with the Cleveland Opera and performed leading roles at the Teatro de Cristóbal Colón, Colombia's national theatre. In January 1984, she returned to the Metropolitan Opera for further performances of Mahagonny, one of which was recorded for the Metropolitan Opera radio broadcasts that aired nationally. Later that year she performed as Mimì with the Hollybush Opera Theatre of New Jersey with Michael Sylvester as her Rodolfo. In 1985, she returned to Rochester to perform Countess Almaviva with the OTR, and portrayed Violetta in a Brooklyn staging of La Traviata with tenor Edgardo Sensi as Alfredo. In August 1985, she sang the role of Rosina in a concert version of Eossini's The Barber of Seville at the Fair Lawn Music Festival in New Jersey. The following October she made her debut at the Wexford Festival Opera in the lead role of Jenny in Rise and Fall of the City of Mahagonny. The Daily Telegraph stated that "Zannoth seemed too phlegmatic, too anonymous to convey Jenny's peculiar allure, and her effective but shrill voice tended to jar as the evening progressed". The Guardian review was much more positive, stating she sang with "thrilling panache".

Zannoth moved to West Germany and was active in opera houses there in the 1980s and 1990s. She was a resident principal singer with Theater Bremen from 1984 through 1994. In 1987, she portrayed Verdi's Violetta to Walter MacNeil's Alfredo with the Opera Company of Mid-Michigan (OCMM). She returned to the OCMM the following year in the title role of Puccini's Tosca. In 1989, she sang the role of Cio-Cio-San in Madama Butterfly in Hong Kong, and repeated that role with the Oakland Opera in California in 1990. After this she toured Europe, Asia, and the Middle East with a group called Ambassadors of Opera, and performed roles in productions of Ariadne auf Naxos by R. Strauss, Puccini's Manon Lescaut, and Verdi's Falstaff. In 1994 and 1995 she was the soprano soloist in the Newtown Chamber Orchestra's performances of Messiah.

In 1995, Zannoth was the soprano soloist in Verdi's Requiem with the Long Island Masterworks Chorus and the Bohuslav Martinů Philharmonic Orchestra at Carnegie Hall, and in 1995, she gave a recital at the municipal building of Lower Makefield Township, Pennsylvania. In 1996, she performed the role of Lady Macbeth in Verdi's Macbeth with the Des Moines Metro Opera, a company premiere conducted and staged by Robert L. Larsen. The cast included Kimm Julian as Macbeth and Matthew Lau as Banquo. That same year she was the soprano soloist in the Verdi Requiem with the Cedar Rapids Symphony Orchestra. In 1997, she portrayed Donna Anna to Gary Martin's Don Giovanni at the New Jersey State Opera. Other operas she performed in during her career included Verdi's Aida, Elektra by R. Strauss, Wagner's Parsifal, and Britten's Peter Grimes. One of her last significant appearances on the opera stage was as Aida with the Mississippi Opera in 2003 with Michael Hayes as Radamès. In 2006, she gave a recital of lieder by Robert Schumann at the First Unitarian Society of Westchester. In 2009, she performed a cabaret tribute concert to Fanny Brice and Molly Picon at the Mahwah Public Library in New Jersey.

== Educator, sacred vocalist, and later life ==
By the 1972–1973 academic year, Zannoth had joined the voice faculty of Ithaca College where she gave a faculty recital with pianist Joseph Tague in March 1973. She performed in a special 1974 concert organized by cello faculty member Einar Holm at Ithaca College honoring composer Pablo Casals and gave another recital at the school that same year. She taught voice at Memphis State University during the 1980s, and later taught voice out of a private studio in New York.

By 1994, Zannoth was living in Yardley, Pennsylvania, having just returned to the United States from living in Germany. She later relocated to Manhattan where she lived in an apartment in Tudor City. When not performing she worked in New York City as the assistant to the director of the Mystery Writers of America. For several years she was part of a paid professional quartet that performed for Friday night and Saturday services at the Hebrew Tabernacle of Washington Heights. She was concurrently a long-time soloist and section leader at Rutgers Presbyterian Church in New York City. A 2001 profile in the New York Daily News highlighted her dedication to sacred music and community service, noting that despite her operatic experience at the Met and City Opera, she remained committed to enriching the church's music ministry.

Zannoth died on November 20, 2012, aged 66, in New York City.
