= Rules for landowners =

Book by Florentine writer Marco Lastri

Regole per i padroni (Egnglish: Rules for landowners) is a work from Florentine writer Marco Lastri, first published in 1793. The original title is Regole per i padroni dei poderi verso i contadini per proprio vantaggio e di loro, con dei Avvisi ai medesimi sulla loro salute. Aggiuntavi alcuni pensieri di un dilettante d'agricoltura sopra il problema di rivestire di piante, e coltivar le montagne spogliate. rovasi in fine de' quesiti fatti ad un dilettante d'agricoltura pistojese sulla coltivazione delle patate, e risposte ai medesimi; e una memoria sull'utilita de' cannetti, e sul metodo di piantarli e custodirli. del proposto Lastri autore delli dodici Calendarj ossia Corso completo di agricoltura pratica.

== Summary ==
=== Rules for Landowners ===
The first section of the work explains useful tips that landowners must follow to maximize their profits.

They must carefully select the farmers who will work the land and ensure that the number of family members is not too high or too low and can provide the right amount of work.

Landowners must pay their farmers' expenses in the periods of the year when the weather does not permit farming, to maintain motivation and health.

Employers must invest in tools to help the farmers.

=== Advice for farmers ===
Lastri underlines the importance of a house's cleanliness. He discusses handling of waste and clean water reservoirs. Farmers must not work when ill and must drink water during the working day. After some tips about diet, the author explains the importance of moderation and self-control to maintain health and serenity.

=== Mountains ===
Mountains are much more suitable for pasture than cultivation. However, landowners have often exploited this type of land, depleting them even of their poor fertility.

Lastri thinks woods and mountain lands should be preserved for environmental, practical and economic reasons.

=== Potatoes ===
This part is an interview of a landowner of Pistoia (a little city near Florence). The landowner explains his secrets to cultivate and cook potatoes.

=== Cane thickets ===
Lastri explains why cane thickets are a useful type of cultivation. Cane thickets are cheap to cultivate and useful to sustain other plants. The work concludes after describing how to practically cultivate cane thickets.

== Editions ==
First edition: Lastri, Marco, 1793, Regole per i padroni dei poderi verso i contadini per proprio vantaggio e di loro, con dei Avvisi ai medesimi sulla loro salute. Aggiuntavi alcuni pensieri di un dilettante d'agricoltura sopra il problema di rivestire di piante, e coltivar le montagne spogliate. rovasi in fine de' quesiti fatti ad un dilettante d'agricoltura pistojese sulla coltivazione delle patate, e risposte ai medesimi; e una memoria sull'utilita de' cannetti, e sul metodo di piantarli e custodirli. del proposto Lastri autore delli dodici Calendarj ossia Corso completo di agricoltura pratica. - In Venice : in printshop Graziosi a Sant'Apollinare.

Second edition: Lastri, Marco, 1803, Regole per i padroni dei poderi verso i contadini per proprio vantaggio e di loro, con dei avvisi ai medesimi sulla loro salute. Aggiuntavi 1. Alcuni pensieri di un dilettante d'agricoltura sopra il problema di rivestire di piante, e coltivar le montagne spogliate e sassose; 2. De' quesiti fatti ad un dilettante d'agricoltura pistojese sulla coltivazione delle patate e risposte ai medesimi; e una memoria sull'utilità de' cannetti, e sul metodo di piantarli e custodirli. Del proposto Lastri Edizione seconda arrichita della Istruzione pratica per la coltivazione della canapa. In Venice: in printshop Graziosi a Sant'Apollinaire.
