= Opera Cleveland =

Cleveland Opera was an opera company based in Cleveland, Ohio.

== History ==
It was incorporated by David Bamberger, Carola Bamberger, and John D. Heavenrich in March 1976 and presented its first season in October and November of that year. Its inaugural production was Giacomo Puccini's Madama Butterfly which opened on October 22, 1976, with soprano Sherry Zannoth in the title role. This was followed by sold-out performances of Rossini's The Barber of Seville. By 1984, it had become the resident opera company at Playhouse Square, with performances at the State Theater. The company played an integral part in the revitalization of Cleveland's historic Cleveland Theater District and was a leader in the movement to make theaters accessible to the physically challenged. There was considerable overlap between the orchestra personnel of the Cleveland Opera, Cleveland Ballet, and the Ohio Chamber Orchestra, to the advantage of all three organizations.

The company was managed from March 1976 to April 2004 by David Bamberger as general director and Carola Bamberger as associate director. In that period, it presented 122 full productions of 74 works by 43 different composers spanning the history of musical theater from Monteverdi to the present. Its casts included some of opera's greatest artists, among whom were Roberta Peters, Jerome Hines, Sherrill Milnes, and (in concert) Plácido Domingo, Luciano Pavarotti, and José Carreras.

In addition to operas and operettas, Cleveland Opera presented several musical theatre favorites, such as West Side Story, Man of La Mancha and My Fair Lady. It received international attention by commissioning and presenting a world premiere opera by a noted Rock musician, Stewart Copeland of "The Police", with his opera Holy Blood and Crescent Moon. The company was also noted for “Cleveland Opera on Tour,” an extensive education and outreach program. It was a member of OPERA America, a national organization which oversees and helps the development of opera across the North American continent.

== Opera Cleveland ==
Following the departure of David Bamberger, the company pursued financial policies that weakened it considerably. The decision was made to merge with another struggling company that operated largely in the summer, Lyric Opera Cleveland. The merged company was named Opera Cleveland and gave its first staged production in April 2007. Mismanagement plagued the company, however, and it became defunct in the fall of 2010.

== Similar Names ==
In subsequent years, two small Cleveland companies changed their names to incorporate the words "Cleveland Opera." In 2014, "Opera per tutti" became "Cleveland Opera Theater" and, in 2017, "Opera Circle" became "The Cleveland Opera." Neither institution is connected to the organization described above.
