= Xander Hunfeld =

Dutch composer (born 1949)

- Born: Alexander J. M. Hunfeld; 6 April 1949 (age 76); Velsen

Alexander J. M. Hunfeld (born 6 April 1949) is a Dutch composer.

The "According to Gurney" 2008-sonatina by Xander Hunfeld was performed by Charles Neidich, Maria Kouznetsova and Martijn Willers in 2013.

== Selected works ==
- Treurmars (2010), for carillon
