= Chiarissimo Fancelli =

Italian sculptor

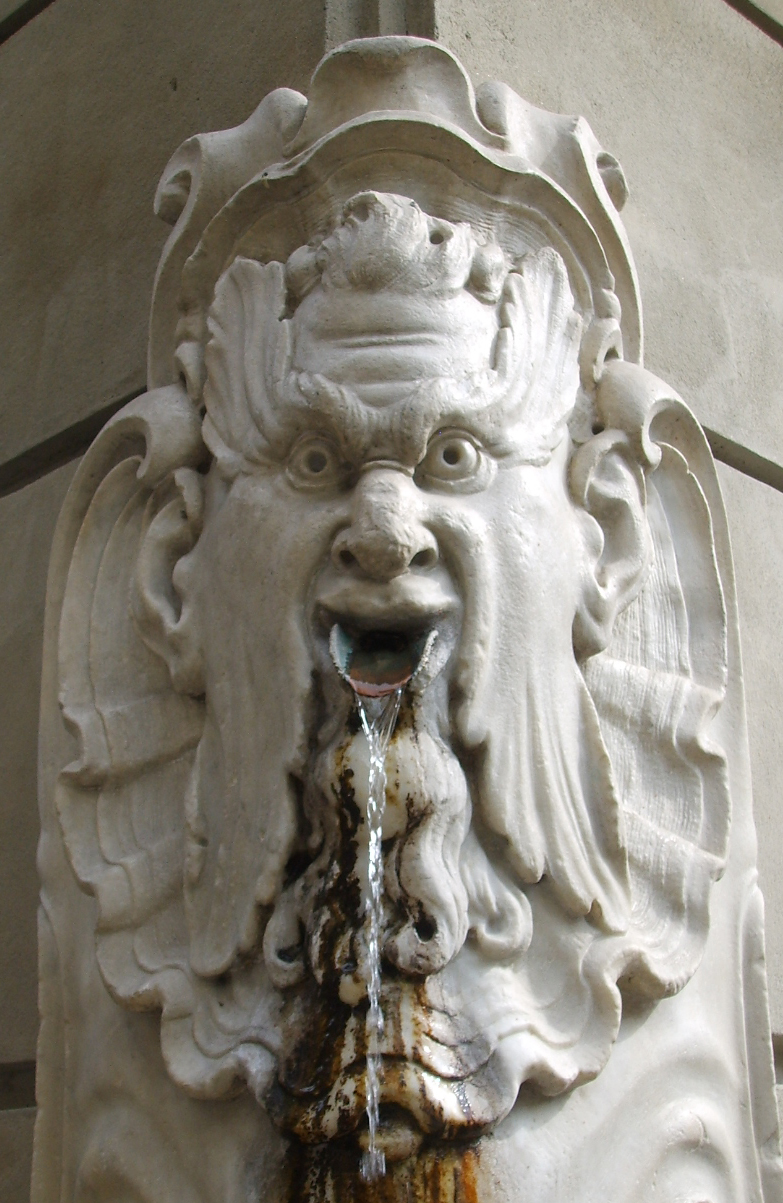
Fontana del Mascherone on the Loggia del Grano

Chiarissimo d'Antonio Fancelli (died 1632) was an Italian sculptor and architect of the late-Mannerist and Baroque periods, mainly active in Tuscany. Domenico Pieratti and Giovanni Battista Pieratti were his pupils. It is unclear how he fits into the large pedigree of Tuscan sculptors including Cosimo and Luca Fancelli.

When Cosimo II de' Medici built the Loggia del Grano in Florence, Chiarissimo Fancelli provided a bust of Cosimo, and a fountain on the corner of the building, the Fontana del Mascherone.
