= Veterinary and georgic recipes =

1793 recipe book by Marco Lastri

Ricette veterinarie e georgiche (English: Veterinary and georgic recipes) is a work by the Florentine writer Marco Lastri, first published in 1793. The original title is Ricette veterinarie e georgiche / raccolte per bene dei proprietari delle terre, e dei contadini dal proposto Lastri autore dei dodici calendarj, ossia Corso completo di agricoltura pratica.

== Summary ==
The work, as introduced by the title, is a collection of recipes for animals and agriculture products. It is organized in two parts, each of which contains twenty-five recipes. In both volumes the topics treated are mixed but only eight of all the recipes deal with animals and veterinary medicine; as of the agricultural ones, which are forty-two, the most important and relevant topic is the wine and the methods for its conservation. Despite this thematic division, the two themes are integrated with each other and together they represent advice and remedies that concern the whole country life.

=== Georgic recipes ===
These kind of recipes represent the heart to the work by Lastri in both volumes. The first of all, Per purgare una Stalla dove siano state Bestie attaccate da mal contagioso, o altri luoghi infetti (To clean a stall where has been beasts attacked by infectious disease, or other infected places), deals with treatments that need to be applied in order to purify the air after hosting infected animals. The ones that deals with wine are ten and there are other four recipes that talks about vinegar and the preservation of the barrels.

According to this, two relevant recipes are Della Riponitura delle viti in luogo delle vecchie (The repositioning of the Screws in place of the old ones) and Per fare un vino simile pressoppoco a quello delle Canarie (To make a similar wine pressurized to that of the Canaries): the first one concerns the rotation of crops, so the advice, whenever is possible, is to change the placing of the vines if they are in fields already used for the same crop or different crops because this is the reason of their short life; in the second one, instead, is inserted a feature present in many recipes: doing something in a similar way as it is done in another country/city. Another topic is the one about the preparation and cultivation of figs, truffles, strawberries, fennel, hams but also recipes for mustards and disinfection from ants.

=== Veterinary recipes ===
These recipes are a small number. One of them is the first recipe of the whole work and another one is the last. The first volume begins with Per la guarigione delle ferite cagionate ai Montoni dalle Spine (For the healing of the wounds caused by the Spine Plugs): as you can understand from the title, the case treated is very specific regarding the subject to take care of but also the contest, as in every veterinary recipes. The particularity of this case is that the author presents two different methods to cure the same disease: it's the only case in both volume. The last recipes of all is Contro il morso delle vipere, e dei rettili che mordono le pecore nelle mammelle (Against the bite of the vipers, and the reptiles that bite the sheep in the breasts): this one is very basic and it explains how to prepare a curative unguent with vinegar, Armenian boletus, scorpion oil and leaves. In the first part we can find also Per avere pollastre molto grasse e con poca spesa (To have very low fat and little expense): this one, unlike the others, is not about a curative methods but it explains how to reach a very wanted result in that epoch; so it has a positive valence.

== Editions ==
- Lastri, M., 1793. Ricette veterinarie e georgiche / raccolte per bene dei proprietari delle terre, e dei contadini dal proposto Lastri autore dei dodici calendarj, ossia Corso completo di agricoltura pratica. Venezia: Stamperia Graziosi a Sant’Apollinare.
- Lastri, M., 1793. Ricette veterinarie e georgiche / raccolte per bene dei proprietari delle terre, e dei contadini dal proposto Lastri autore dei dodici calendarj, ossia Corso completo di agricoltura pratica (parte prima). Venezia: Stamperia Graziosi a Sant’Apollinare
