= Loggia del Grano, Florence =

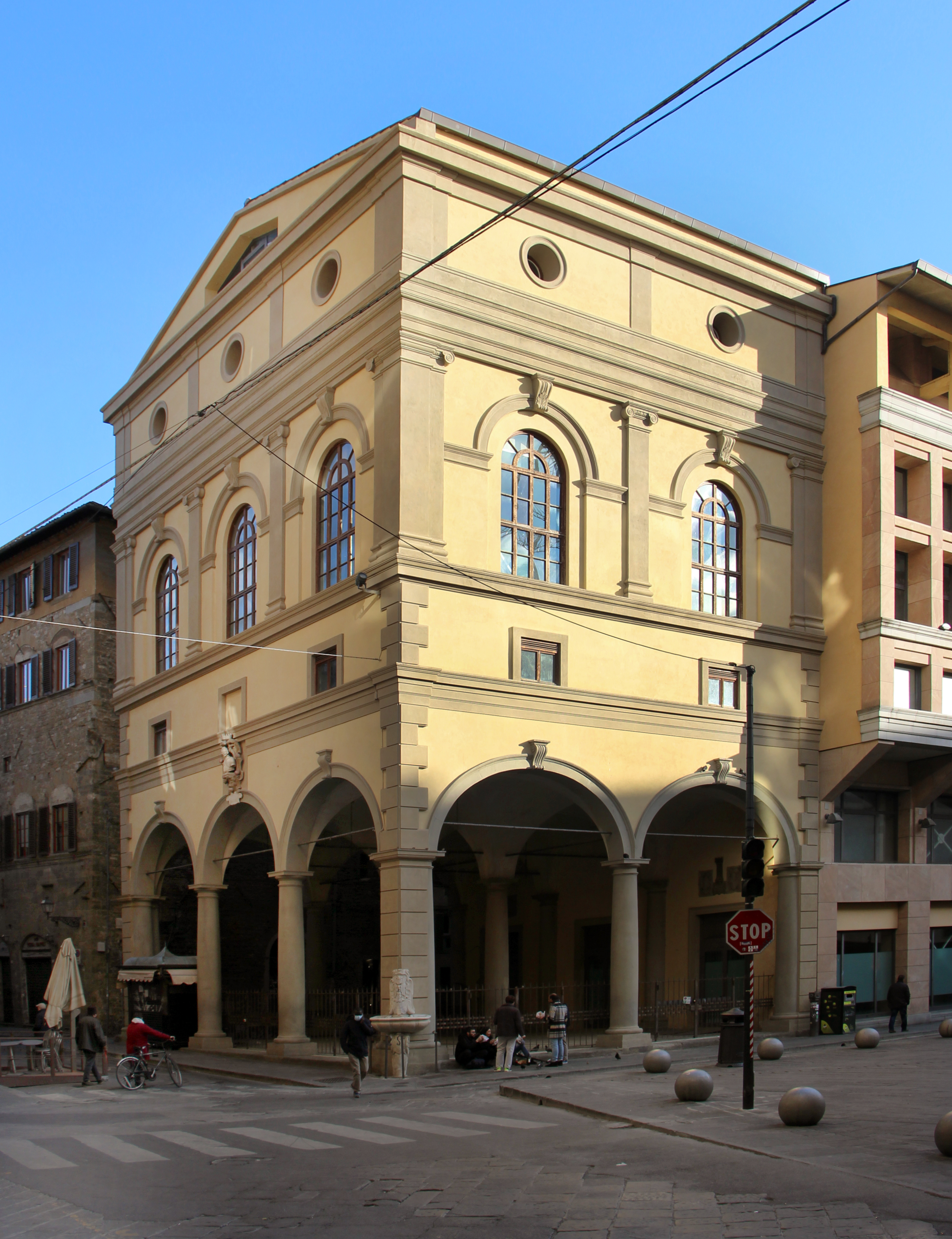
Loggia del Grano, Florence

The Loggia del Grano is a 17th-century rectangular building with an open ground floor arcade, located on Piazzetta del Grano, at the corner of via de' Neri and via de' Castellani, just southeast of the Palazzo Vecchio, in Florence, region of Tuscany, Italy; the portico served as the marketplace for grains while the upper stories were used for storage.

The loggia was commissioned in 1619 by Grand Duke Cosimo II de'Medici from the architect Giulio Parigi, pupil of Bernardo Buontalenti. The bust of the Grand Duke stands on the facade on Via del Neri. In the 19th century, the upper structure was converted into a theater, later into a cinema.

On the Northwest corner is a small marble fountain, Fontana del Mascherone, with a grotesque face, designed and sculpted by Chiarissimo Fancelli, inspired by the Fontana dello Sprone in Oltrarno that had been built by Bernardo Buontalenti. Fancelli also was the author of the bust of Cosimo II.
