= Siena Synagogue =

Synagogue in Siena, Italy

- Italian: Sinagoga di Siena
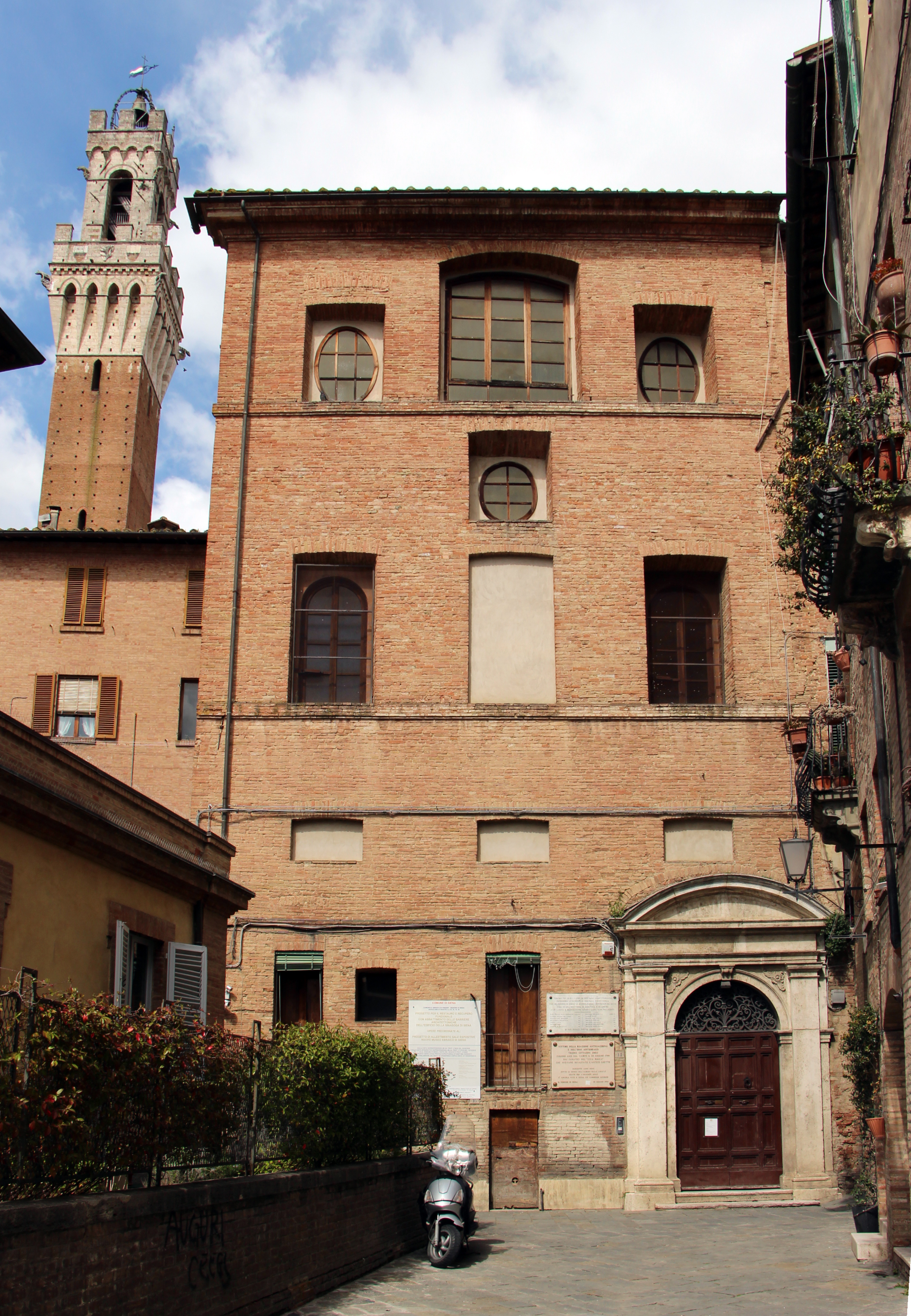
- Exterior of the synagogue, in 2014

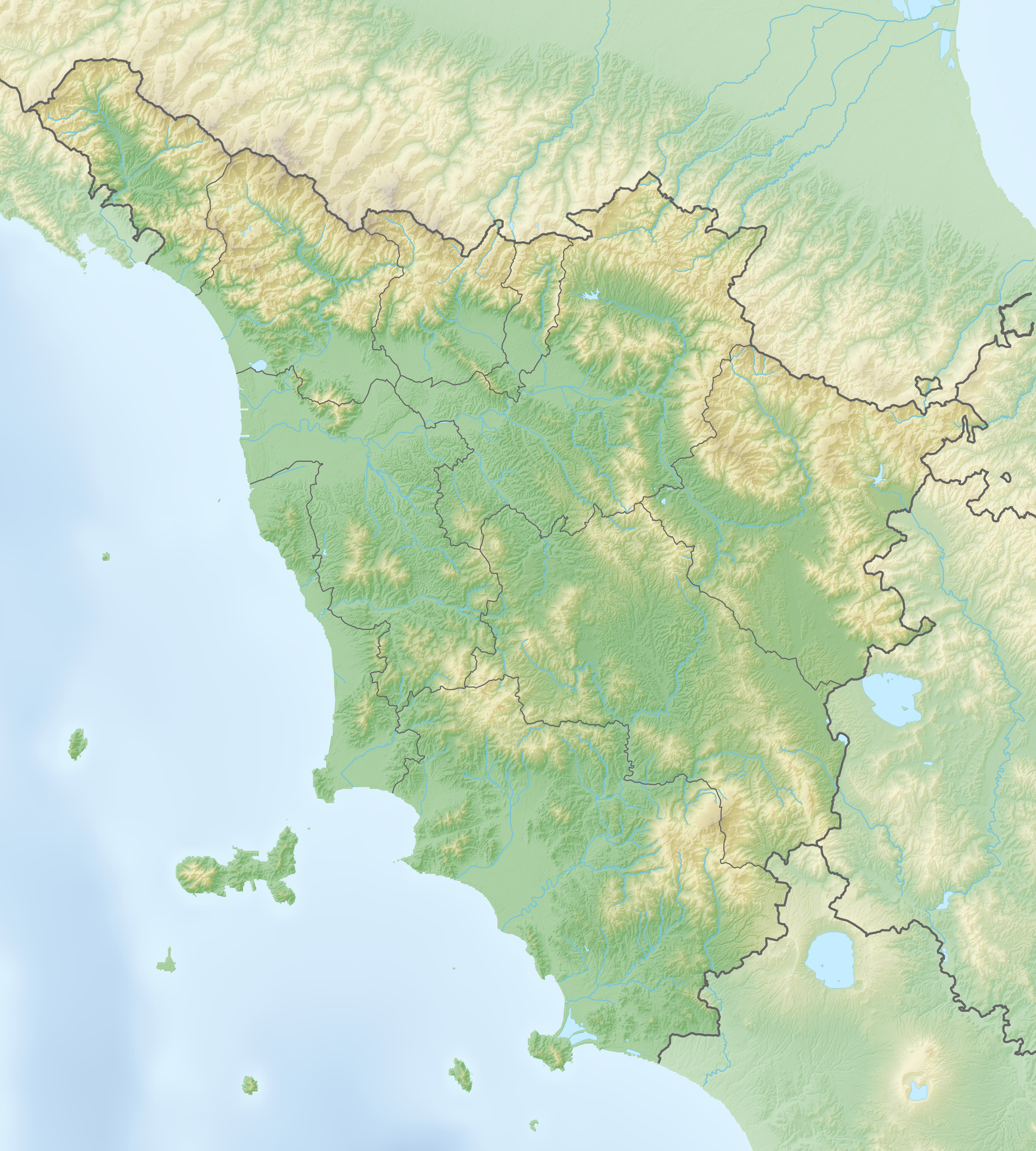
- Location of the synagogue in Tuscany

Religion
- Affiliation: Orthodox Judaism
- Rite: Nusach Ashkenaz
- Ecclesiastical or organisational status: Synagogue; Jewish museum
- Ownership: Jewish Community of Florence
- Status: Active; (temporarily closed for renovations from August 2024)

Location
- Location: via delle Scotte 14, Siena, Tuscany
- Country: Italy
- Coordinates: 43°19′06″N 11°19′59″E

Architecture
- Architect: Giuseppe del Rosso
- Type: Synagogue architecture
- Style: Rococo; Neoclassical
- General contractor: Niccolo Ianda; Pietro Rossi
- Established: 1457 (as a congregation)
- Completed: May 1786
- Materials: Brick

Website
- jewishsiena.it

The Siena Synagogue (Italian: Sinagoga di Siena) is a notable, historic Orthodox Jewish congregation and synagogue, located at via delle Scotte 14, in Siena, Tuscany, Italy. The building also houses the Jewish Museum of Siena, a Jewish museum. Designed by Giuseppe del Rosso in the Neoclassical style with extensive Rococo features, the synagogue was completed in May 1786.

In April 2024, the building was listed as one of the seven Most Endangered Heritage Sites in Europe. In August 2024, the synagogue was closed for restoration work.

== History ==
A substantial Jewish community is recorded in Siena beginning in the 14th century. In 1571 the Medici restricted Jewish residence to a defined neighborhood, or ghetto, and it was in this neighborhood that a synagogue was built on the Vicole dell Scotte very close to the Piazza del Campo. The Jews were emancipated from the requirement of living in a ghetto in 1860.

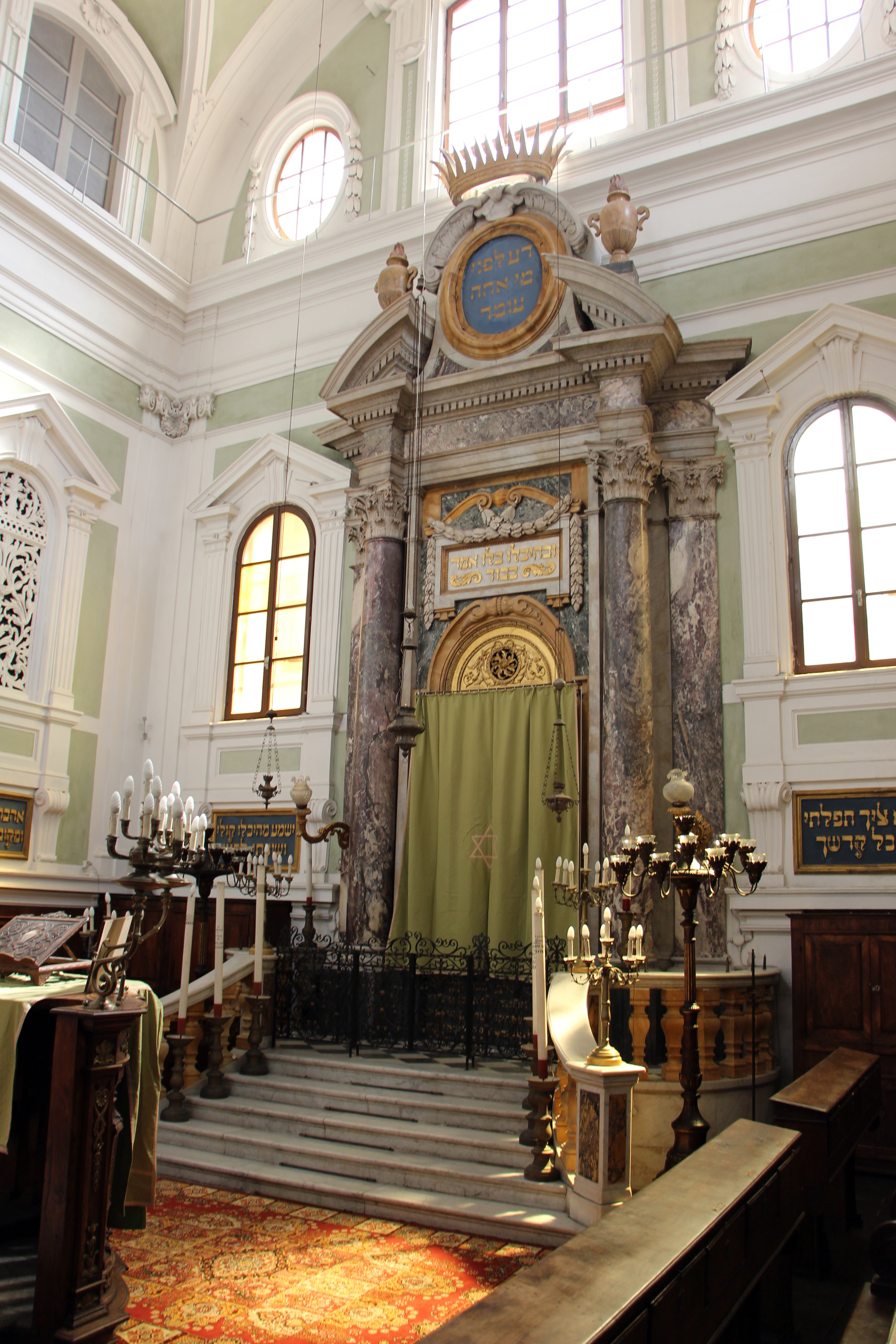
Interior of the synagogue

The present synagogue was erected in 1786 on the site of the older synagogue. Because Jews in that era were prohibited from building houses of worship identifiable from the street, the stone facade of the four-story building is plain, resembling neighboring residential buildings. The sanctuary is located on the first floor (one flight up from street level). It has an elaborate Neoclassical interior, with a lofty Baroque Revival ceiling featuring a large crowned tablet of the Ten Commandments enthroned in clouds of glory. Two tiers of balconies on the building's third and fourth stories have views into the room through elaborate baroque grills. Furniture is arranged in the historic style of the Italian Jewish community, with the bimah in the center of the room. The Torah Ark is a classical marble cabinet with marble pillars and entablature towering almost the height of the room.

The architect was Giuseppe del Rosso of Florence, the master builders were Niccolo Ianda and Pietro Rossi.

The synagogue is open to visitors. In August 2024, the synagogue was closed for restoration work.

The historic Jewish cemetery of Siena also survives and is open to visitors.

== See also ==
- History of the Jews in Italy
- List of synagogues in Italy
