= Fontana dello Sprone =

Coordinates: 43°46′5.18″N 11°14′59.69″E

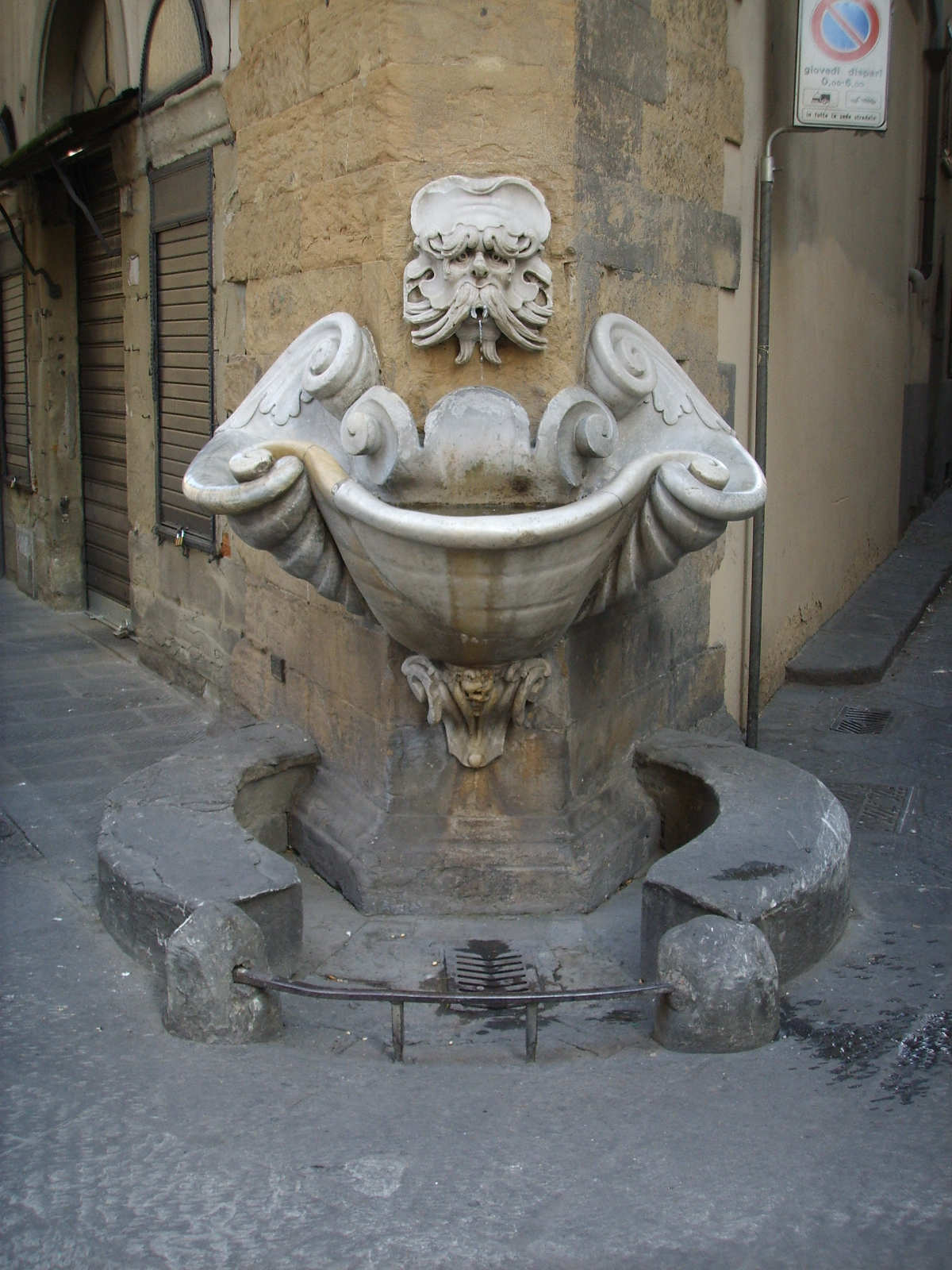
Fontana dello Sprone

The Fountain dello Sprone, or Fontana dello Sprone, is an early 17th-century Mannerist-style public fountain found at the corner of via dello Sprone and Borgo San Jacopo, in the quarter of Oltrarno in the city of Florence, region of Tuscany, Italy.

The fountain, located at the acute angle (sprone) formed by the intersection of the two streets, nestled against the private building, was traditionally supposed as designed and sculpted by Bernardo Buontalenti, who would have completed it in 1608, likely for the celebration of the wedding of Cosimo II de' Medici and Maria Maddalena d'Austria. Anyway, more recent studies discovered that it was sculpred by Francesco Generini in 1638-1639, at the end of the construction of a water conductured for ferdinando II de' Medici.

The fountain consists of a grotesque bearded face with a water spout protruding from its mouth, with a swirling marble conch basin below. It has undergone various restorations: in the 17th century by Giuseppe del Rosso, and a recent restoration in 2014.
