= Fiesole School of Music =

Coordinates: 43.798°N 11.293°E

The Fiesole School of Music (Italian: Scuola di Musica di Fiesole) is a music school in Fiesole, Italy. It was founded by Piero Farulli (it) in 1974.

It presents an annual New Year's Day concert at the Teatro del Maggio Musicale Fiorentino.

A premier institution at the Fiesole School of Music is the Orchestra Giovanile Italiana, the national youth orchestra of Italy.

As of 2008, violinist Pavel Vernikov was a tutor at the school, and Maria Kouznetsova one of his students.
