= Giovanni Maria Lampredi =

Italian jurist, scholar and writer

Giovanni Maria Lampredi (6 April 1731–17 March 1793) was an Italian jurist, scholar, and writer, active in Tuscany. He is also remembered for his text on Etruscan culture.

== Biography ==
He was born in Rovezzano to a family of modest means. An older brother became a Franciscan friar, but Giovanni Maria studied classical languages and literature at the Seminario Eugeniano in Florence under Francesco Poggini. He studied philosophy under the provost Francesco Fossi. Graduating with a degree in canon law and theology in 1756, he joined the intellectual circles including of Giovanni Lami, Marco Lastri, and Giuseppe Bencivenni Pelli. His letters to Pelli were published (1760-1769) in 3 volumes under a pseudonym, where he imagined a utopia called Gelopoli. He subsequently published a treatise on the philosophy of the ancient Etruscans (1756) and about the government of ancient Tuscans and its decadence (Lucca 1760). In 1755, he joined the Academic Society of Colombaria and the Accademia Etrusca di Cortona. In 1770, he joined the Accademia della Crusca.

In the 1760s, he published the biography of Machiavelli for a large multivolume work eulogizing famous Tuscans. He also translated some extracts from Rosseau. He wrote a treatise on the just wars, titled De licentia in hostem and a treatise on good government by a ruler titled De Maiestates Principis.

In 1763, he inherited from his father the Cavallate estate, which the Lampredi had bought from the Perini family. He served from 1763 to 1773 as a docent in canon law at the University of Pisa, replacing Giovanni Antinori. He later became a professor of civil law (diritto pubblico). From 1767, Lampredi worked on his most important but esoteric work, derived from his teaching: the Iuris pubblici universalis, sive Iuris naturae et gentium theoremata (Livorno 1776-78; Pisa in 1782; and Florence, 1792–93). During these years, his friendship with Marco Lastri became strained.

Among his students were Francesco Foggi, Pietro Ranucci from Citta di Castello, V. Ceramelli, and G. Carmignani. He died in Florence.

== Works ==
- Saggio sopra la filosofia degli antichi Etruschi (1756)
- Del governo civile degli antichi toscani e delle cause della lor decadenza (1760)
- Juris publici universalis sive Juris naturæ et gentium theoremata (1782)
- Diritto pubblico universale, o sia Diritto di natura e delle genti (trad. ital. del precedente: 1818)
- De Licentia in Hostem (1759)
- Del commercio dei popoli neutrali in tempo di guerra, Florence, 1788.
