= Castagnajo's calendar =

1793 book by Marco Lastri

Calendario del castagnajo (English: Chestnut grower's calendar) is a book by Florentine writer Marco Lastri, published in 1793. The full title of the text is: Calendario del castagnajo nel quale restano descritte le faccende mensuali del castagnajo. Scritto dal proposto Lastri descrizione utilissima nella quale s'indica l'unico mezzo di far propagare una pianta di tanta utilita per alimentare la gente della campagna, articolo dell'agricoltura in molti luoghi dell'Italia trascurato; con infine la regola per macinar le castagne, e la maniera di conservarne la farina. (English: "Calendar of the chestnut grower, in which the monthly growth of the chestnut tree is described Written by Lastri, the book talks about how to grow the plant, which feeds the people of the countryside (though it has been neglected in Italy). It also talks about rules for grinding chestnuts, and methods to preserve the flour".)

== Summary ==
Castagnajo's calendar is made up of 13 volumes. These books offer a complete course on the cultivation of chestnut trees in Italy. The introduction provides an overview of the importance of chestnut flour and its role helping people to survive. The subsequent 12 books represent the twelve months of the year. In summary, the 13 volumes teach readers the methods of growing and harvesting a chestnut orchard by instructing which months are best for grafting, pruning and irrigation. It includes information on chestnut-derived products: ink, flour, tables, baskets, coal and fodder.

== Editions ==
- First edition: Lastri M., 1793. Calendario del castagnajo nel quale restano descritte le faccende mensuali del castagnajo. Scritto dal proposto Lastri descrizione utilissima nella quale s'indica l'unico mezzo di far propagare una pianta di tanta utilita per alimentare la gente della campagna, articolo dell'agricoltura in molti luoghi dell'Italia trascurato; con infine la regola per macinar le castagne, e la maniera di conservarne la farina. In Venezia: nella stamperia Graziosi a S. Apollinare (Con Pubblica Approvazione).
- Second edition: Lastri M., 1805. Calendario del castagnajo nel quale restano descritte le faccende mensuali del castagnajo. Scritto dal proposto Lastri descrizione utilissima nella quale s'indica l'unico mezzo di far propagare una pianta di tanta utilita per alimentare la gente della campagna, articolo dell'agricoltura in molti luoghi dell'Italia trascurato; con infine la regola per macinar le castagne, e la maniera di conservarne la farina. (Nuova edizione accresciuta). In Venezia: nella stamperia Graziosi a S. Apollinare.
