= Carnival song =

A carnival song or canto carnascialesco (pl. canti carnascialeschi) was a late fifteenth- and early sixteenth-century song used to celebrate the carnival season in Florence, mainly the weeks preceding Lent and the Calendimaggio, which lasted from May 1 to June 24. The festivities included song and dance, usually performed or led by masked professionals.

The carnival song was elaborated under the rule of Lorenzo the Magnificent (1469–92) and the court became more involved. Lorenzo wrote lyric poems designed to be sung by members of his court and of the city's guilds, whose members also sang their own songs, with lyrics drawn mostly from popular legend and daily life. These canti are the textual descendants of the caccia, a song form that was typically satiric and obscene, revelling in the double entendre. The musical settings were generally chordal and strophic (often ABBC), similar to the frottola, which was then popular in Mantua. The A and B stanzas were typically in common metre, the final stanza was then in perfect (i.e. 3/4) time. Performance outdoors and before popular audiences probably constrained the music to be simple and unsubtle. These songs were usually serenades, chariot songs, and processionals, often song from parade floats.

Though we know that Heinrich Isaac composed canti carnascialeschi for Lorenzo around 1480, none of these works survive. One anonymous surviving song, Orsu car' Signori, is an advertisement paid for by the guild of scribes: "Step up, dear sirs, if you wish your bulls quickly certified." The fate of many of the canti was sealed by the fall of the Medici and the Bonfire of the Vanities (and the like) under Girolamo Savonarola. Some melodies escaped destruction by being set to new (sacred) words. The canti, with the carnivals, were restored after Savonarola's downfall in 1498, but they were increasing ceremonial in character and the exercise of writing songs for them became more literary.

== Sources ==
- Grout, Donald Jay, and Palisca, Claude V. (2001). A History of Western Music, 6th ed. New York: W. W. Norton & Co. ISBN 0-393-97527-4.
- "Carnival song". (2008). In Encyclopædia Britannica. Retrieved 30 August 2008, from Encyclopædia Britannica Online.
