= Teatro Verdi (Florence) =

Theatre in Florence, Italy

Coordinates: 43°46′11.82″N 11°15′39.68″E

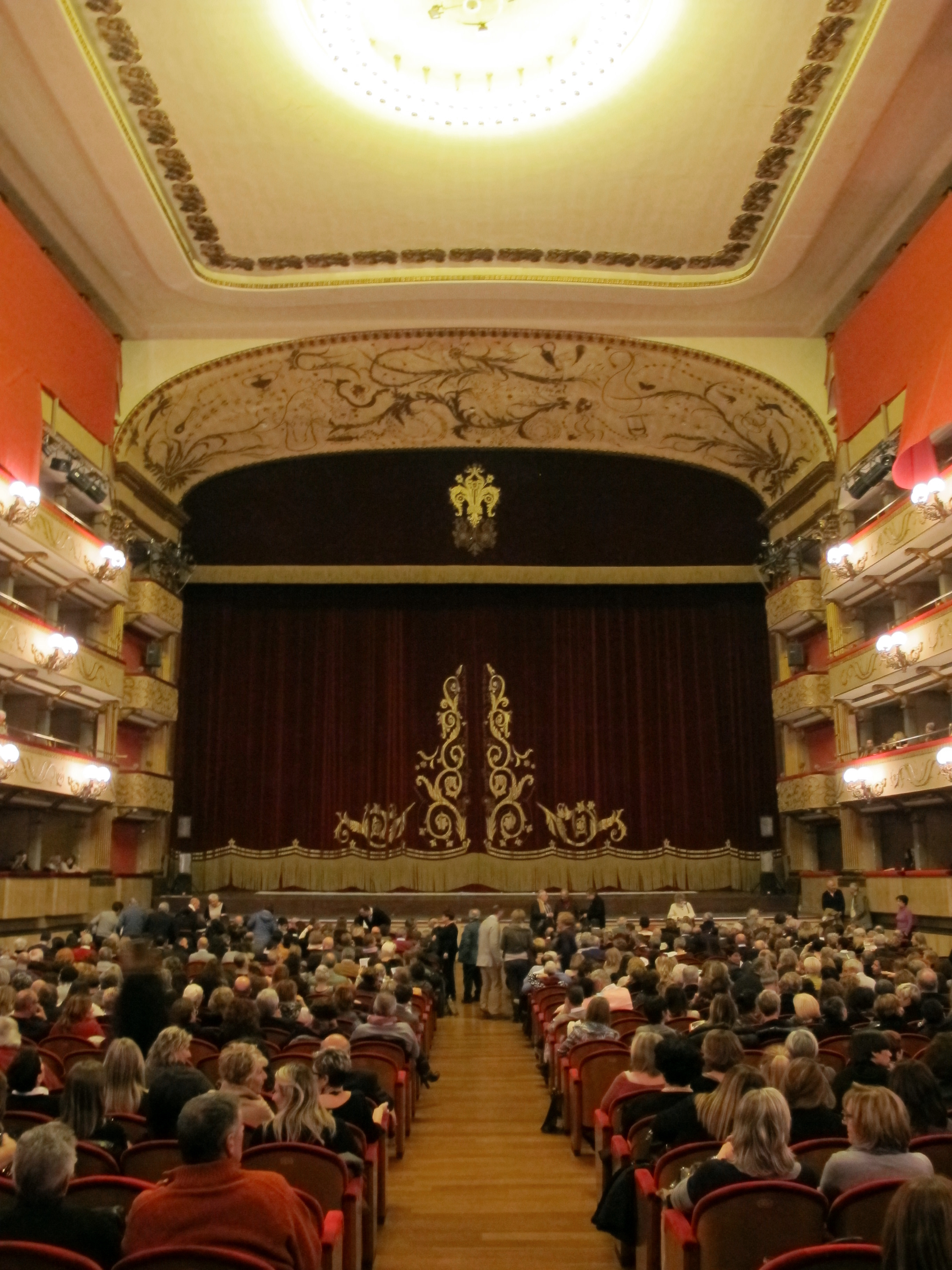

Teatro Verdi is a theatre in Florence, Italy. Established in 1854, it is located on Via Giuseppe Verdi on the block between Via Ghibellina and Via dei Lavatoi. The Teatro Verdi was originally called Teatro Pagliano, but was renamed in 1901 to honour Giuseppe Verdi. The theatre is located on the spot where there once stood the 14th-century Stinche Prison.

The theatre seats an audience of 806, including 6 reserved for wheelchairs. The stage is 14 metres deep and 18 metres wide, with a slope of 5%. The orchestra pit measures 16 metres by 4 metres. The proscenium is 12 metres wide and 17 metres high and 2 metres deep, and the stage is raised from the floor by 1.5 metres. The seven artists' dressing rooms and two wards have access from Via Isola delle Stinche where there is also an infirmary.
