= Orchestra del Maggio Musicale Fiorentino =

Founded in 1928 by Vittorio Gui as the Stabile Orchestrale Fiorentina, the Orchestra del Maggio Musicale Fiorentino is an Italian symphonic orchestra. It is resident in Florence, at the Maggio Musicale Fiorentino Theatre.

== Conductors ==
- Victor De Sabata
- Antonio Guarnieri
- Gino Marinuzzi
- Tullio Serafin
- Wilhelm Furtwängler
- Bruno Walter
- Otto Klemperer
- Erich Kleiber
- Dimitri Mitropoulos
- Herbert von Karajan
- Leonard Bernstein
- Claudio Abbado
- Carlo Maria Giulini
- Georges Prêtre
- Wolfgang Sawallisch
- Carlos Kleiber
- Georg Solti,
- Riccardo Chailly,
- Giuseppe Sinopoli,
- Seiji Ozawa
- Daniele Gatti
- Zubin Mehta
