= Giuseppe Del Rosso =

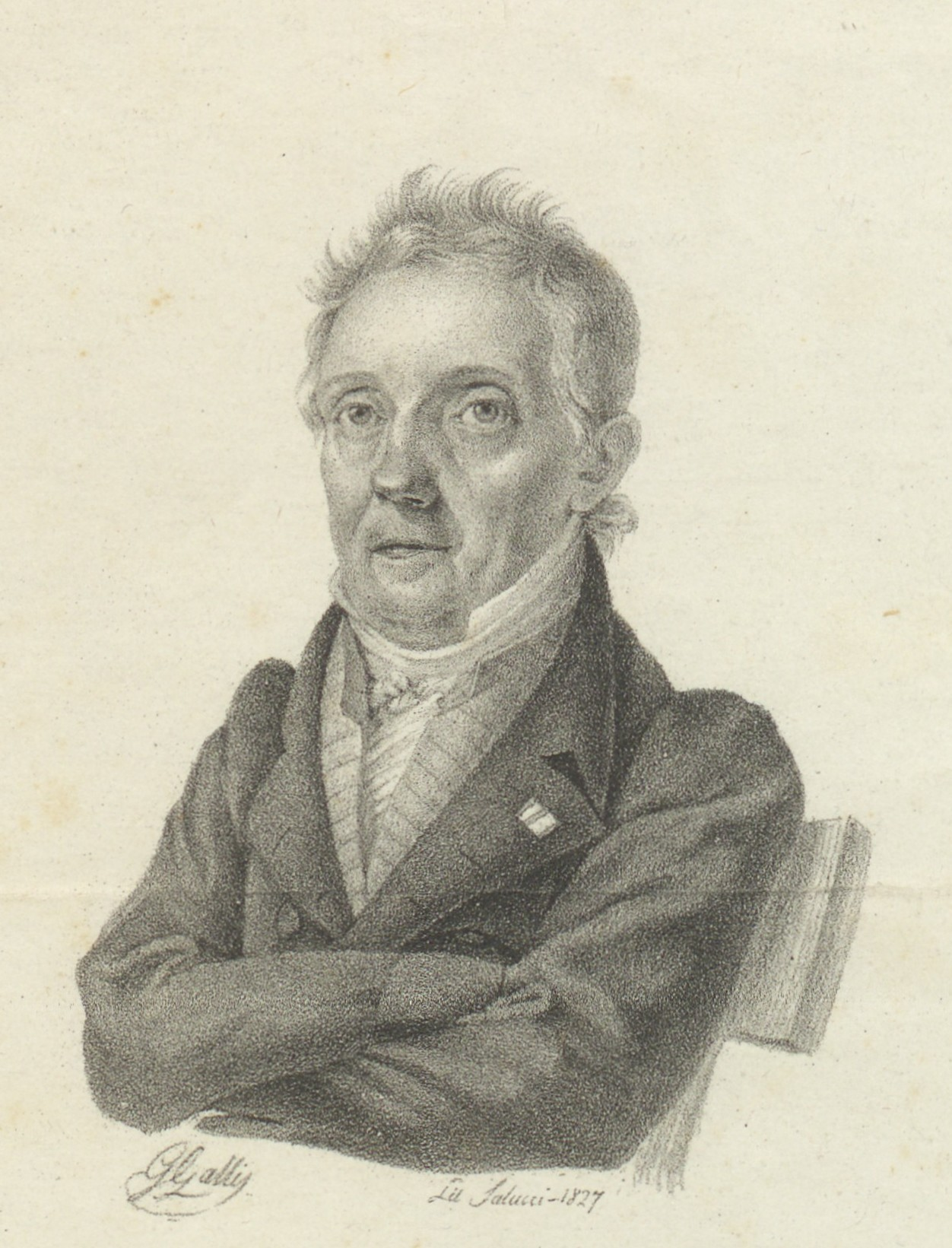
Portrait of Giuseppe del Rosso, 1827

Giuseppe Del Rosso (May 16, 1760 – December 22, 1831) was an architect and architectural writer, mainly active in late 18th and early 19th-century Florence and Tuscany.

== Biography ==
He was born in Rome, the son of the architect Zanobi Del Rosso, and obtained his first commissions from the Grand-Duke Peter Leopold of Habspurg-Lorraine. In 1790, he sojourned for a year in Rome, where he met the French architectural historian D'Agincourt. Returning to Tuscany, he completed projects at the Pitti Palace for Prince Leopold and worked on restoration projects in Siena after its 1798 earthquake. He helped design the Teatro Goldoni in Florence. He was awarded the medal of the order of San Giuseppe. He was a member of the Society of the Georgofili in Florence.

He became a collaborator with Marco Lastri in the editorship of a 6 volume set of observations on cultural monuments and buildings in Florence, which proved as a guide, sometimes anecdotal, for the sophisticated foreign travelers, titled L'Osservatore fiorentino sugli edifizj della sua patria.

Among his publications are:

- Osservazioni di Giuseppe Del Rosso su la Basilica fiesolana di S. Alessandro (1790).
- Ricerche storico-architettoniche sopra el singolarissimo tempio di San Giovanni di Firenze (1820).
