= Teatro Goldoni (Florence) =

Theater in Oltrarno, Tuscany, Italy

Coordinates: 43°45′52.97″N 11°14′39.74″E

The Teatro Goldoni of Florence was first opened in 1817 at the site of the former Annalena monastery in Oltrarno, region of Tuscany, Italy. The theater, dedicated to the playwright Carlo Goldoni, has a main facade on the narrow Via Santa Maria #15, it is near the corner with Via de Caldaie.

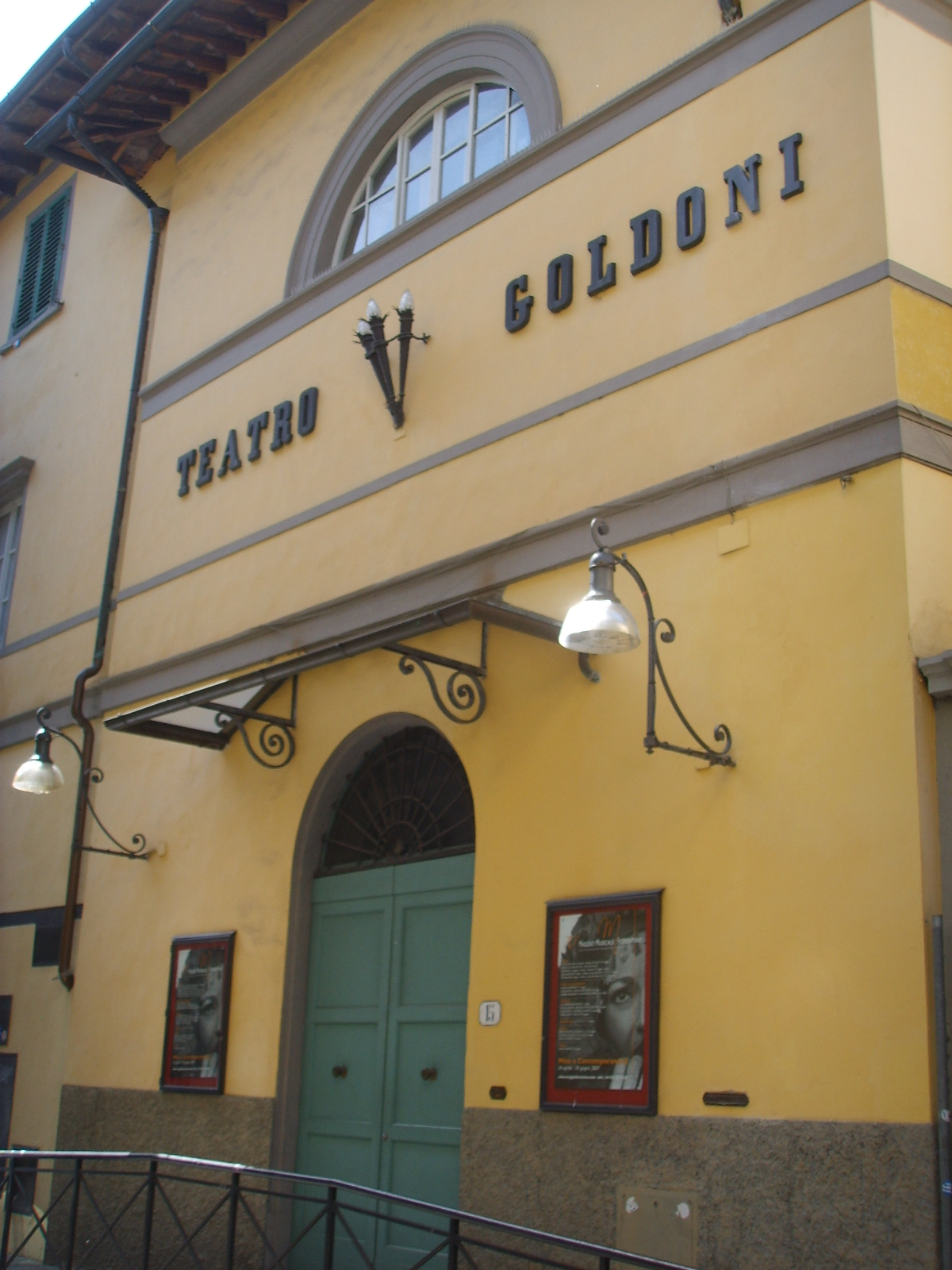
Facade

== History ==
The monastery took its name from Annalena Malatesta, the wife of Baldaccio d'Anghiari, a 15th-century condottiero, known to Dante, who was killed by treachery by a rival at the Palazzo Vecchio. Annalena after the subsequent death of her only son, converted her house into a convent. Within this convent, both the father of Cosimo I and Tommaso Soderini are said to have found temporary asylum from proscription.

In the early 19th-century, the monastery was vacated and the property expropriated. The theater producer Luigi Gargani obtained the property, and commissioned the design from architect Giuseppe del Rosso. On opening, the theater had 80 booths and sat 1600 spectators.

The theater was restored and reopened in 1997.

Nearby on Via della Fornace, Gargani had Del Rosso design a Teatro Diurno or Teatro L'Arena, for daytime performances. This theater was sited where the Bilioni family once had a house. In 1356, this site was made into a monastery, under the Augustinian of San Giovanni Battista and Santa Chiara. The monastery was suppressed and converted to a theater in the Spring of 1818. It could house 1500 spectators in seven ground rows and two upper floors. In 1819, the church at the site became a school, and later the studio of the 19th-century sculptor Francesco Pozzi.
