= Republic of Massa =

Sovereign state in Central Italy, 1225–1336

Republic of Massa: Repubblica di Massa (Italian)
- 11 September 1225–5 October 1336
- Flag Coat of arms
- Capital: Massa Marittima
- Common languages: Italian; Latin
- Government: Oligarchic classical republic
- Podestà
  - 1225 (first): Bernardino del fu Losco
  - 1336 (last): Bindo de’ Buondelmonti
- Legislature: Senato dei Sette Anziani; Consiglio Maggiore
- Historical era: Middle Ages
  - Established^{1}: 11 September 1225
  - Public renunciation of government over the city by the last bishop of Massa Marittima Alberto II: 1225
  - Conquest by the Republic of Siena: 1336 5 October 1336
- Currency: Denaro minuto Massano, Grosso Agontano Massano
Preceded by	Succeeded by
Holy Roman Empire	Republic of Siena
- Today part of: Italy

The Republic of Massa (Italian: Repubblica di Massa) was a small Italian state located in Central Italy that existed from 1225 to 1336. It was founded in today's city of Massa Marittima and expanded to cover an area corresponding to the current upper Maremma.

It represented a commercial power of regional level, through its thriving mining district, thanks to the copper, alum and silver deposits in which its territory was rich.

== History ==
=== Birth of the Republic of Massa di Maremma ===
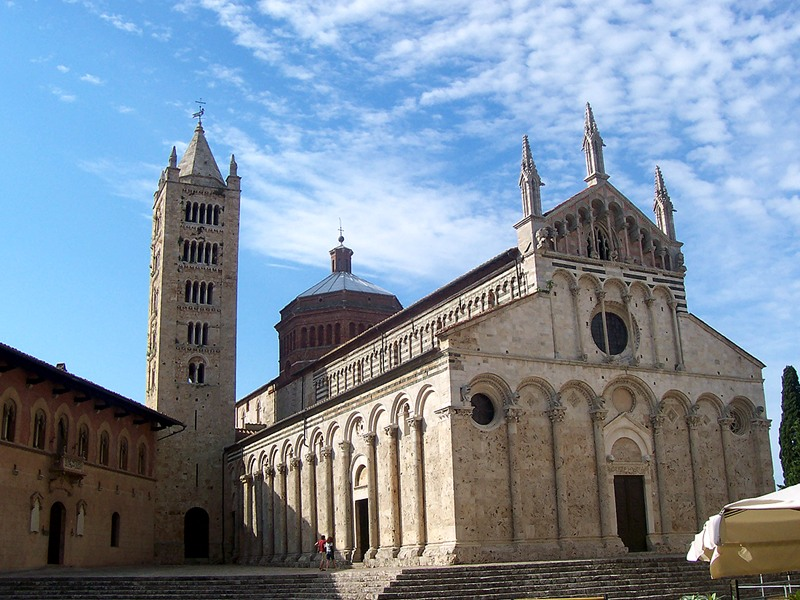
Cathedral of Massa Marittima, built from the 11th century and finished in the 14th

The growth of the town of Massa Marittima is due to the relocation of the populonese bishopric to the city. The ancient city of Populonia mainly linked its economy to the processing of raw iron, transported by ship from the mines of the Island of Elba, since the Etruscan and Roman periods. However, due to the increase in pirate raids and the concomitant development of mining activities in the hinterland, Populonia entered a period of heavy decline which led to a change in the territorial balance in the area. The city of Massa benefited greatly from this centuries-old process and, from the 11th century, it witnessed the movement of the episcopal see within its walls.

Thanks to its strategic position it was in fact possible to control a large area of the Colline Metallifere rich in precious metals. This fortunate feature allowed the development of the village at the foot of the castle of Monteregio, an elegant domain of the bishop, and in the area of the square where today the major city buildings and the Cathedral stand, dedicated to San Cerbone, ancient bishop of Populonia.

Following a series of donations from castles and lands close to the city, the temporal power of the bishopric increased and from 1196 the bishops began to call themselves "Princes of Massa".

The advent of the thirteenth century opened a flourishing period for Massa Marittima, which saw its population grow rapidly, thanks to an improvement in living conditions, greater safety of the mines and increased wealth of the inhabitants.

On 21 April 1216, by the will of the bishop-prince Albert II, Massa Marittima swears allegiance to Pisa to enjoy his military protection.

This great economic rise, driven in particular by the resumption of mining activities, in conjunction with a progressive debt of the bishops, made possible the birth of the community of Massa, in the form of a city republic. With prior agreement between Bishop Alberto II and the Massetani of 31 July 1225, drawn up by the imperial notary Rolando, the prince-bishop publicly renounced his government over the city in exchange for the payment of the debt of six thousand pounds of Pisan money that he had contracted with Sienese lenders. On 1 November of the same year, the day of All Saints, while the Massetani in Montieri paid a thousand silver marks of Massa to Ranieri di Raullo and his companions from Siena to settle the debt of the bishop, the Vicedomino Sigerio of Orlandino Galleana was named first mayor of the Republic.

=== Economic rise of Massa and the league with the Republic of Siena ===
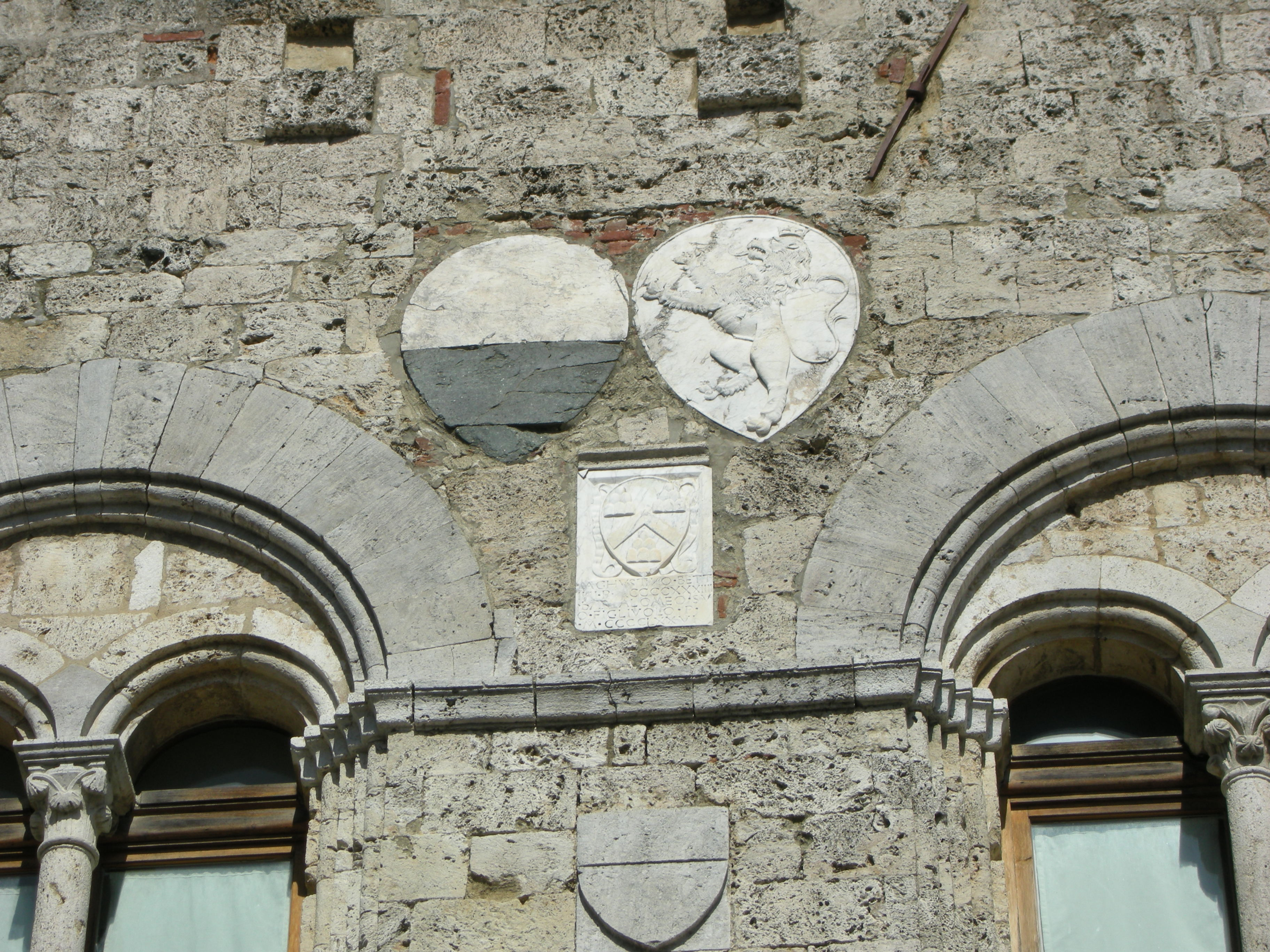
The rampant lion of Massa (right) and the balzana of Siena (left) on the Palazzo del Podestà, to symbolize the league between the two republics

From 1241 the political balance of the city brought the Massetana Republic to a progressive approach to the Republic of Siena, sanctioned by an official alliance between the two. Massa Marittima lived up to the agreements and in 1260 supported its friend Siena at the battle of Monteaperti, with a contingent of 100 soldiers. The Massetano-Sienese alliance then became a real offensive and defensive league, starting on 16 March 1264.

The same year the armies, Sienese and Massetano, marched together on Campiglia Marittima, which had rebelled in Siena.

The political clash between the Ghibellines and Massa's Guelphs led the Republic of Siena to erect itself as guarantor of the inner peace of the city, shaken by strong conflicts between the noble Pannocchieschi family and the municipality. In 1276 a large alliance treaty was thus reached, in which it was established, among other things, that Massa should be governed, for twenty years, by Sienese podestàs

The Republic of Massa participated in the Guelph coalition formed by Florence and Siena to attack the city of Arezzo, guilty of having driven the Guelph exponents from its territory. After attacking various minor castles and besieging Arezzo, the Sienese and Massa army, strong with 3,000 infantrymen and 400 cavalrymen, was defeated by the Aretine army at the Giostre del Toppo on 26 June 1288. Massa, however, managed to avenge this defeat with the victory of Campaldino the following year, where the Guelph coalition defeated the Ghibelline army led by Arezzo.

In 1313 Republic of Massa supported the Republic of Siena in a military action in the Pisan territory up to Piombino to free the ally Lucca, which was then part of the Guelph league, from the siege led by Uguccione della Faggiola.

=== Hostility with Siena for Gerfalco and Montieri ===
In 1317 strong controversies arose between Siena and Massa over the possession of the castle of Gerfalco. After various negotiations and disagreements with the Pannocchieschi for possession of that, the noble family decided to donate the country by renouncing their rights to it and the Republic of Massa took advantage of the situation and immediately occupied the village. However, this upset the Sienese, who claimed to boast the right of ownership over it and sent their ambassadors to Maremma. Given the refusal of Massa Marittima to the ally's requests, the league between the two cities was broken and the Republic of Siena declared that it wanted to take Gerfalco by force. The Sienese army then arrived in Gerfalco, led by Captain Paolo di Guido Baglioni and besieged the castle, until on 30 June 1318 the Council of Massa decided to make the village so as to appease the two states and form a new league.

However, the enmity with the Sienese remained very strong in the citizens of Masseto, so much so that a popular uprising led by Niccoluccio Todini broke out in the city, who defenestrated and killed the Sienese podestà of Massa Niccoluccio Mignanelli. In order not to start a war with Siena, the city senate decided to punish the leader of the revolt with exile.

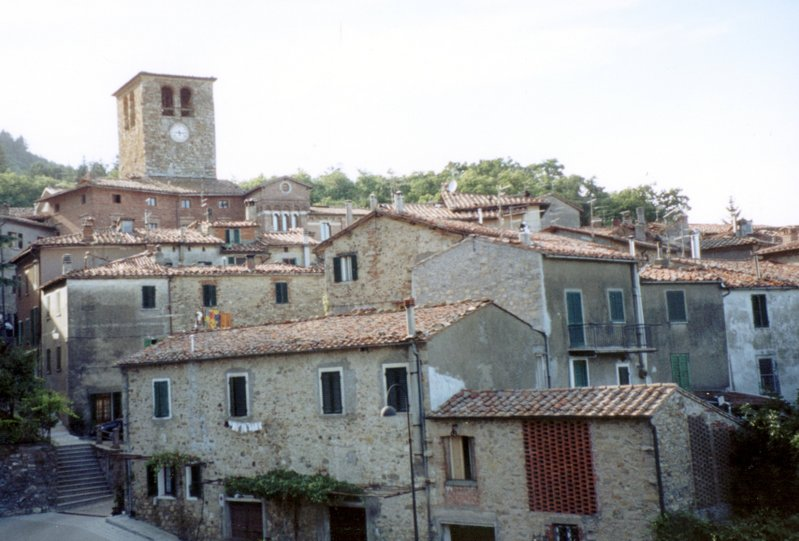
Montieri, its rich silver mines attracted the sights of Siena, Massa and Volterra

In 1326 a strong dispute arose for the control of Montieri between Volterra, Siena and Massa. The latter, attracted by the rich silver mines and their profits, occupied the Montieri district militarily by virtue of an imperial diploma of 1160 with which Frederick I, recognized the rights of that land to the city of the Maremma. Massa, however, could not benefit from this conquest for a long time because already the following year she was forced to recognize half of the castle and the mines to the Republic of Siena, after receiving an ultimatum from the Sienese ambassadors who would otherwise have led to the war with the ally.

=== The end of the Massa Republic ===
==== Massa War ====
In 1330 Massa turned against Siena, the Sienese mayor was driven out and in his place the Florentine Lanzante Foraboschi was appointed. The Sienese who at that time had greatly increased their strength in Maremma attacked the territories of the Republic of Massa taking Perolla, Gavorrano, Colonna and Monterotondo (probably corrupting the soldiers). Given the heavy losses suffered in the initial phase of the conflict, the Sienese Niccolò Cerretani was appointed to Massa to try to sign a truce in the clashes. However, the proposal was rejected by Siena, now determined to subdue the city of Massa.

On 12 December 1330 the troops of the Republic of Siena attempted a first assault on the Maremma city by corrupting some members of the Ghiozzi and Galluti families in order to make the enemy army penetrate the city through the doors of their buildings. But discovered the treason, the Massetian army foiled the attack, defeating the Sienese troops in the current Via Valle Aspra and pushing them out of the city.

Seeing his own territory surrounded by the Sienese who have become hostile, Massa decided to seek help from the Republic of Pisa, placing himself under his protection. On 3 June 1331 the league between the two cities was then sanctioned in an anti-Sienese function, welcoming the Pisan captain Dino della Rocca into the walls of Massa.

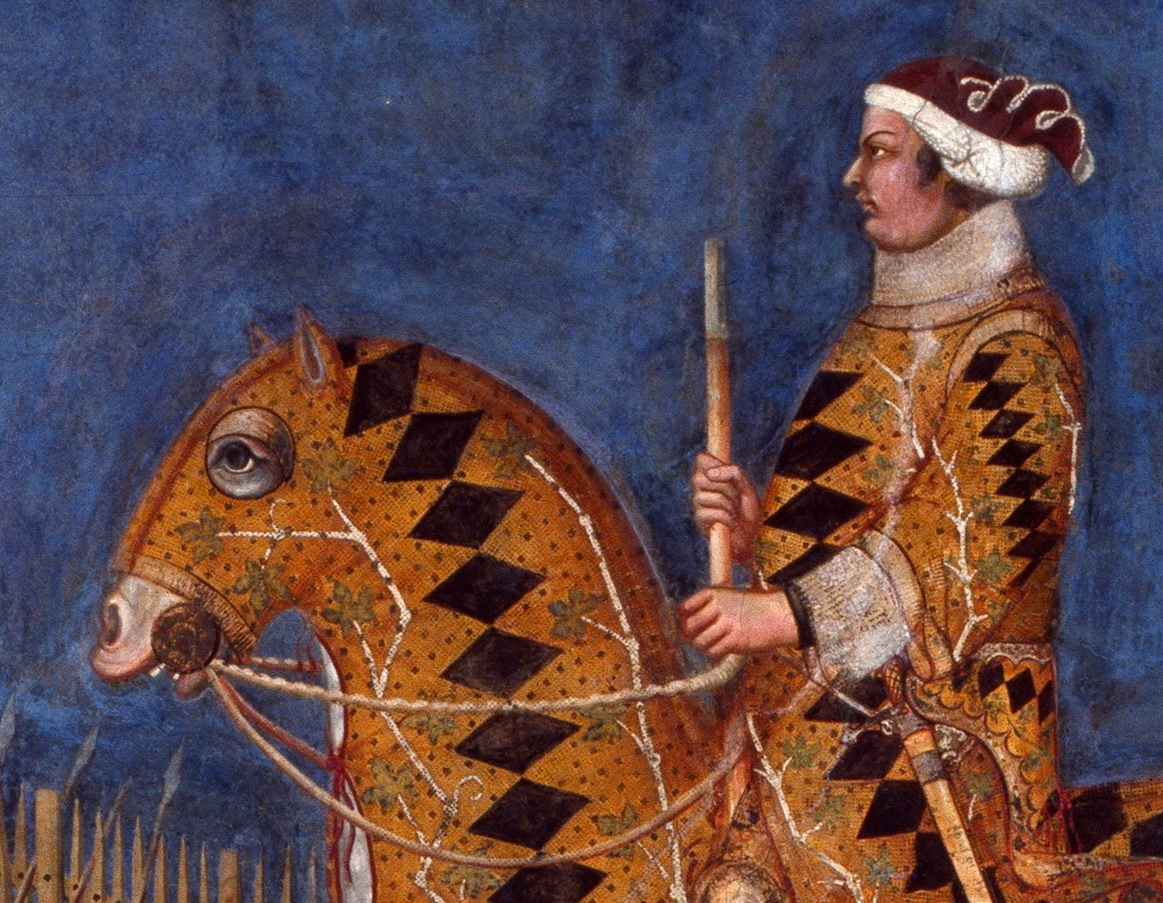
Guidoriccio da Fogliano, commander of the Sienese army in the battle of Giuncarico

The Pisan-Massetan troops, strong of 200 knights and 2000 infantrymen, left Massa to regain the occupied castles. On 14 December 1332 in the plain of Giuncarico they clashed with the enemy troops, strong of 2000 infantrymen and 400 knights, led by the War Captain of the Republic of Siena Guidoriccio da Fogliano and Moscata Piccolomini. The people of Massa managed to catch Moscata Piccolomini's troops by surprise, who initially had to retreat. The retreat of the Sienese troops must have seemed to the troops led by Dino della Rocca a real retreat, so much so that he launched himself eagerly against the enemy. This decision made the Pisan-Massetano army lose compactness and made their troops more exposed to the counterattack of the Sienese army which had now taken up its position. The Massetans were defeated by the battle, losing 200 soldiers, 6 military banners and Captain Dino della Rocca, who was taken prisoner together with 200 other soldiers.

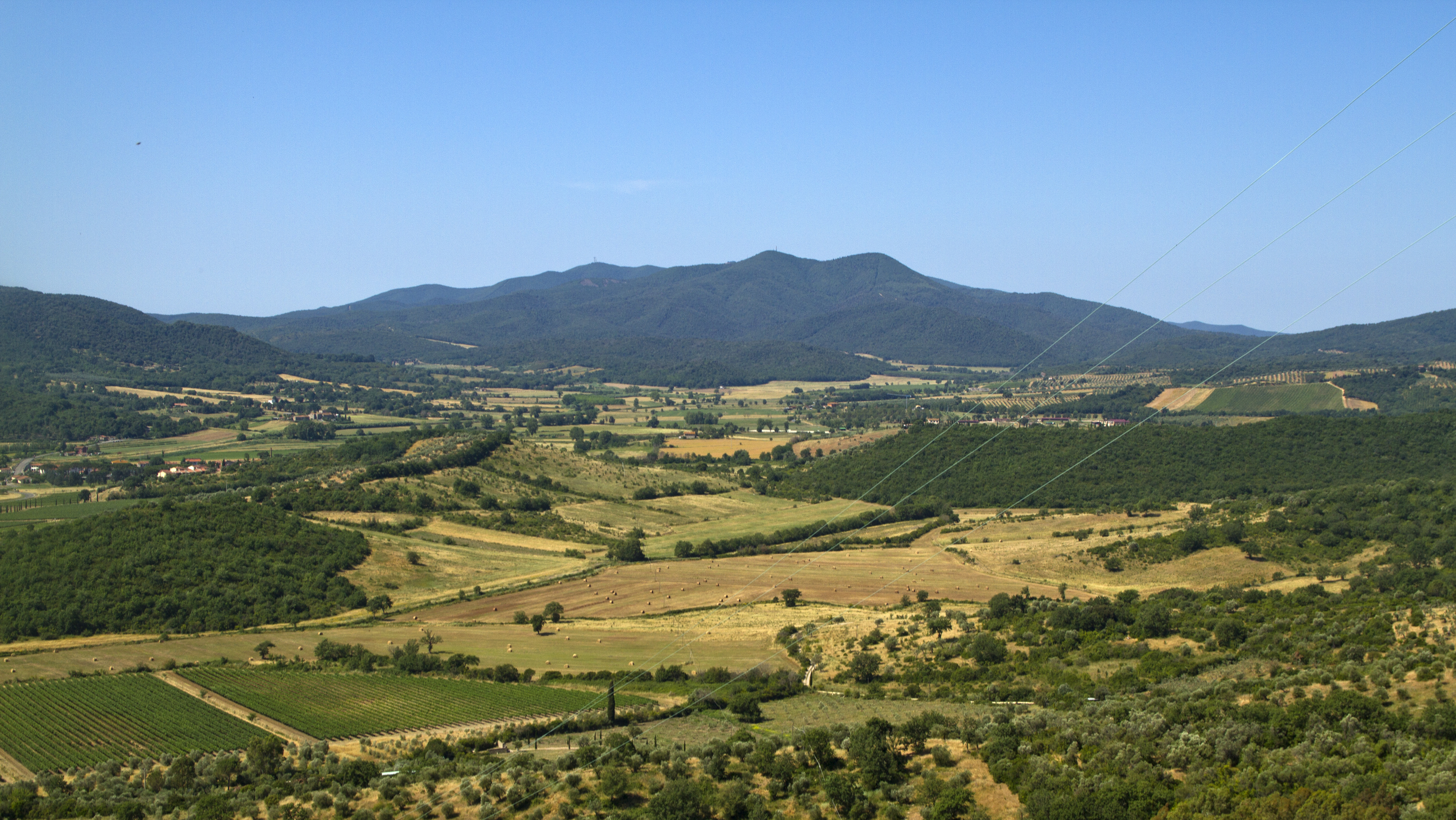
The plain of Giuncarico, where on 14 December 1332 the field battle took place between the Pisan-Massetan militias led by Dino della Rocca and the Sienese troops led by Guidoriccio da Fogliano

The defeat of Giuncarico greatly damaged the Republic of Massa, which was forced to ask the enemy for a two-month truce for the great famine and shortage of goods that followed. Despite the position of military superiority in which the Sienese army found itself after the field victory, which would have seen them favored in a possible direct attack on Massa, it was decided by the Siena government to accept the proposed truce. In fact, the prolongation of the state of war was considered positive, so as to weaken the enemy further.

Following new requests for help sent to Pisa, an army of 800 knights arrived in Maremma led by the exiled Florentine Ciupo Scolari, with the captains Roberto dalla Rocca, Piero delle Statere, Cellino dal Colle and Benedetto Maccaione dei Gualandi, in support of the cause Massetana. After initially attempting to besiege Paganico the captain directed his troops into the Sienese territory, burning and looting the countryside. Ciupo Scolari led other devastations near the Gonfienti fortress, in Pieve a Cappiano, Montepescini and Bagno a Macereto. In February 1333 he then took the via di Orgia, Stigliano and Torri; reaches Rosia and approached Siena putting all the castles, villages and houses encountered on his way to fire and then return to Massa.

The war captain of Siena, Guidoriccio da Fogliano, although he had superior forces, with an army made up of 800 knights and 7000 infantrymen, after the help from Arezzo and Perugia, decided to avoid the field battle, limiting himself to following the enemy. This prudence of his was seen as excessive and for this reason his behavior was later suspected of intelligence with Pisa.

The protracted war between the Republic of Massa, Pisa and Siena worried the Guelph part of Tuscany. Florence therefore wanted to intervene to promote peace and put pressure on Pope John XXII to appoint his bishop as peacemaker above the parties. On 4 September 1333, a peace treaty was signed in Florence, the result of a compromise between the parties: the troops of Pisa would have left the Massa territory free, Siena would have to return the lands occupied during the war and the Republic of Florence was appointed lordship to guard of the Republic of Massa for three years.

With the signing of the peace treaties, through the episcopal award of Florence, all citizens, fled or driven out during the war, were given the opportunity to return to their cities. This point of the award gave the possibility of returning to their homes even to the exiles from Masseto who had proved to be pro-Sienese and who had been exiled for this fact. Thus it was that the members of the Ghiozzi and Galluti families also returned to their city, returning to their own buildings and assets, which had been confiscated for treason, after the failed assault of the troops of Siena on 12 December 1330.

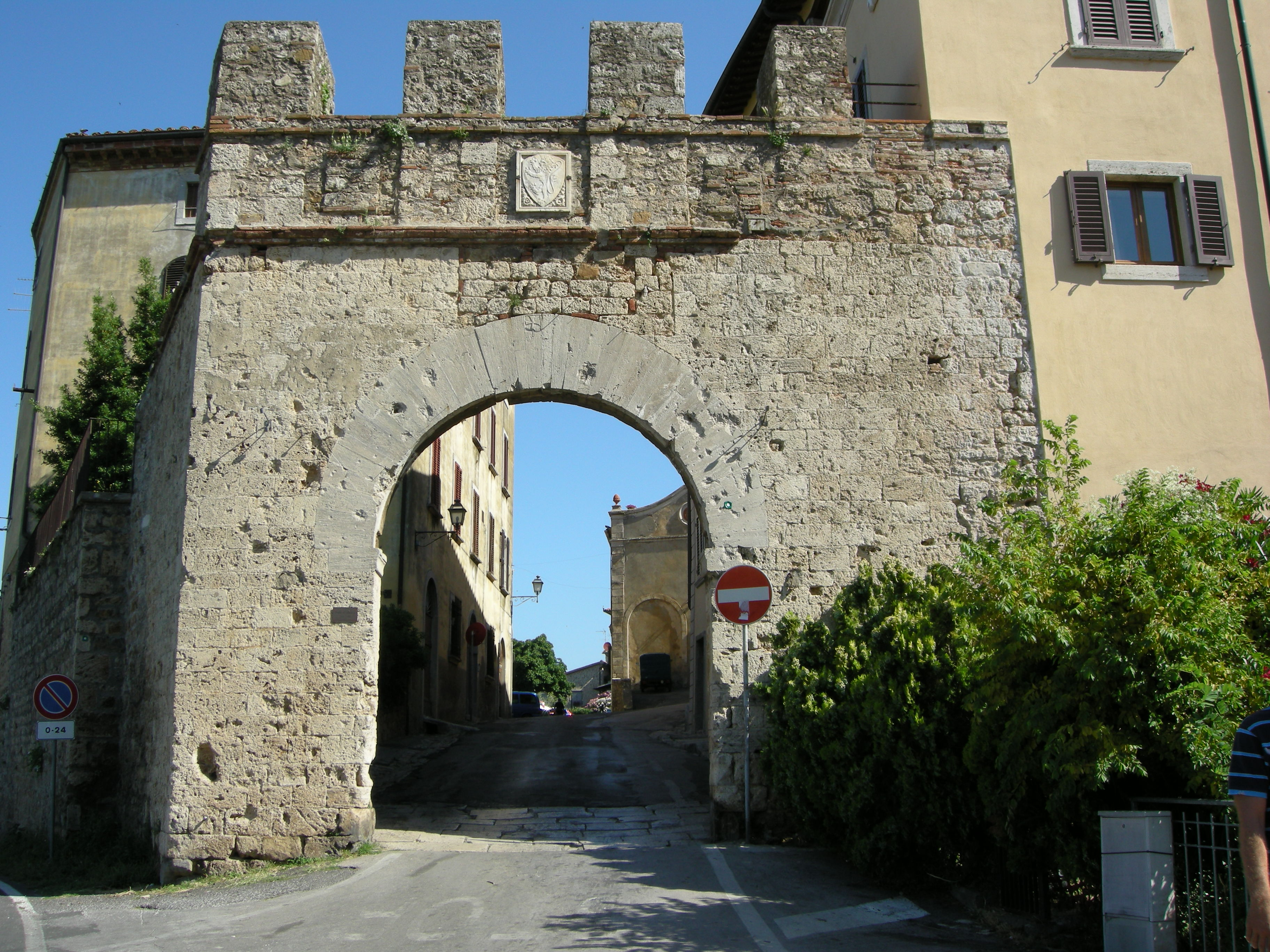
Porta al Salnitro, point from which on the morning of 24 August 1335 the troops of the Republic of Siena entered, following the betrayal of the Ghiozzi and Galluti

The pro-Sienese faction, led once again by Ghiozzi and Galluti, resumed contact with the enemy who at that time was engaged with their army in Maremma, for the definitive pacification of Grosseto after some anti-Sienese riots that occurred in the city. Taking advantage of the proximity of the Sienese army to the Massa territories, a surprise attack was then hatched. With the complicity of the pro-Sienese faction, the Porta all'Arialla (the current Porta al Salnitro) was left open late at night, so that enemy troops could enter at the appointed time. So it was that on the morning of 24 August 1335 the army of the Republic of Siena, led by Captain Jacopo Gabrielli, secretly entered the city and together with the citizens who had organized the betrayal, they took all the defensive positions of the Old City surprising the citizens in their sleep.

The Todini, Beccucci and Butigni families, however, managed to escape the massacre and fortified themselves in the fortress of the New City, trying to resist the enemy assault, waiting for reinforcements from Pisa, which never came. After more than a year of siege, the surrender was decided, signed regularly by the Masset ambassadors on 5 October 1336, ending the freedom of the Republic of Massa.

During the period of domination of the Republic of Siena, a last popular uprising was attempted in 1338 to drive the Sienese militias that occupied Massa from the city. The revolt led by Francesco Luti and Messer Ciambellano managed at first to drive out the Sienese podestà Francesco Malavolti, but was subsequently quelled with the arrival from Siena of 500 soldiers led by Francesco Accarigi. The leaders of the rebellion were tried and sentenced to death, while the other supporters suffered fines.

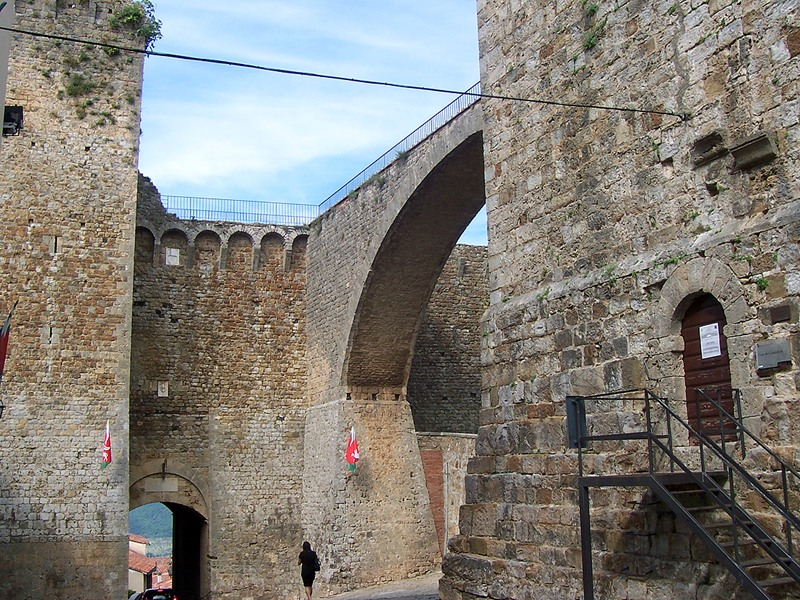
The Sienese Cassero of Massa Marittima, symbol of the military domination of the city, after the fall of the Republic of Massa

Following these events, the government of the Republic of Siena decided to build the Sienese Cassero and a new section of walls that would separate Massa between Città Nuova and Città Vecchia in two, in order to prevent any new attempt to revolt in Siena.

== Government ==
The Republic of Massa was governed by seven elders and the Gonfaloniere di Giustizia, assisted by nine gentlemen who formed the government, and who took turns every fifteen days to define the priors, two effective and one alternate. A podestà, or Captain, with Vicar or Judge Assessor, a Judge of Appeals and a Major Council appointed by the nine lords every 18 December, and composed of 90 councilors, with a minimum age of 25 years, including 30 for each quarter of the city.

Every 200 citizens of each third party, between 20 and 50 years of age, constituted a People's Society or Militias, and for every need, they had the burden of rushing to the public square, where they had the obligation to gather all citizens to place themselves at their orders in defense of the Republic.

== Foreign policy ==
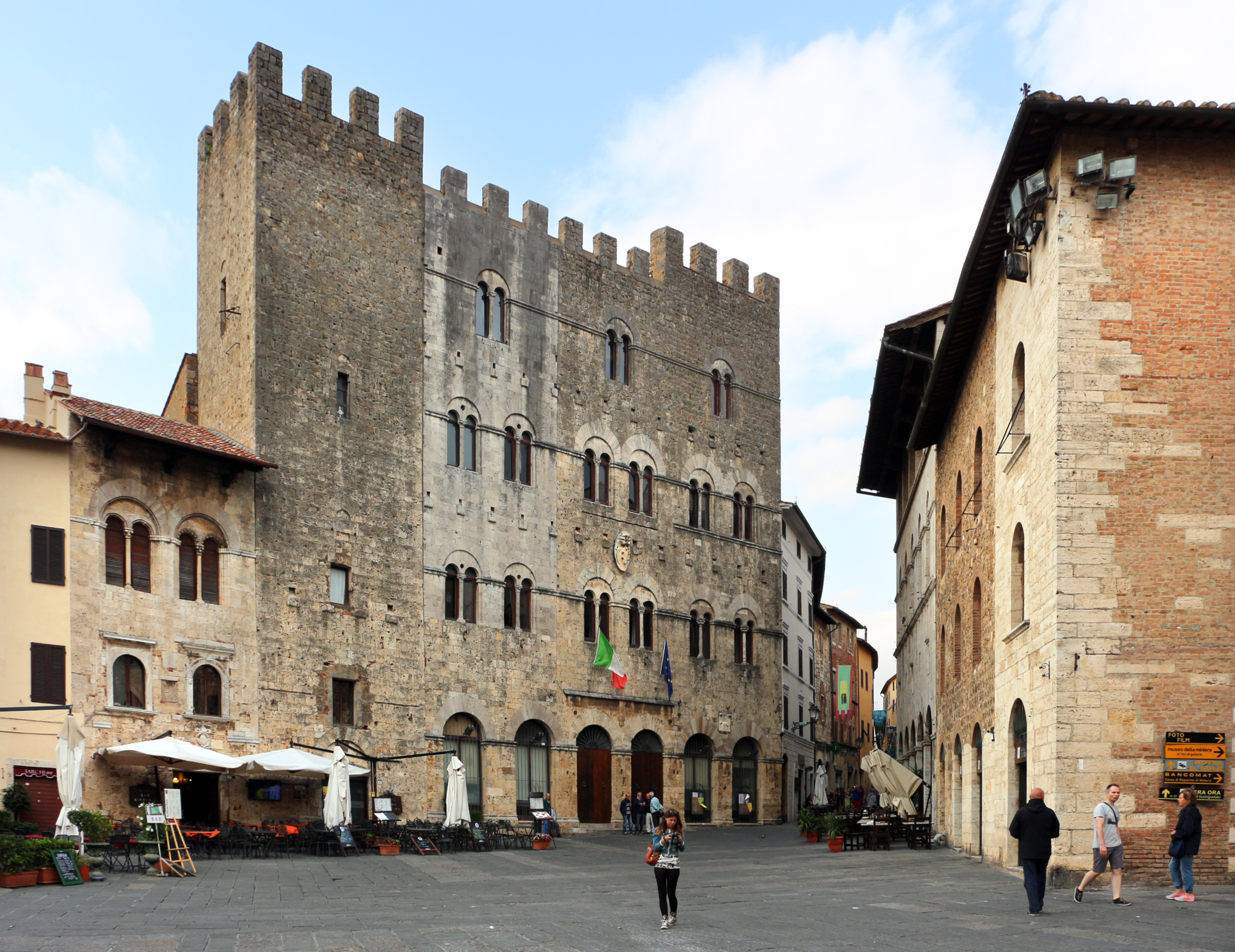
Municipal palace of Massa Marittima

In a period of strong political opposition between the Emperor and the Pope, Massa found himself almost always taking positions close to the republics of Pisa and Siena, the two neighboring powers. This characteristic, obviously dictated by the disparity of organizational and military forces against Massa, led the Republic of Massa to be of the Ghibelline faction until 1280 and subsequently Guelph. However, such behavior was held only for reasons of foreign policy of proximity to Siena: the majority of the citizens of Massa were in fact part of the Guelphs. Such a situation led to a growing internal rivalry with the greater Massa noble family of the Pannocchieschi, part of the Ghibellines, who forcefully meddled in city affairs, siding against the city that hosted them, until Massa banned them and confiscated their assets. The Pannocchieschi, who were strongly supported in Siena, placed themselves under the Sienese tutelage allowing a strong intrusion of the Tuscan city in the Massa affairs. In 1263, to avenge the banished Pannocchieschi, Siena intervened energetically and forced Massa to exile those of its citizens who were enemies of the Ghibelline family and with the Sienese-Massetan league of 1276 they were able to return to Massa.

Although the foreign policy pursued by Massa has been a good neighborhood for a long time, both with Pisa and with the Republic of Siena, rivalries with the municipality of Volterra were frequent. In 1250 the enmities intensified to such an extent that Volterra declared war on the Republic of Massa, which called Siena for help, who intervened to avoid the conflict and pacify the two Tuscan cities. Despite the Sienese interposition, the rivalry with Volterra remained very strong, so much so that a second peace was signed on 16 October 1270. A real normalization of relations came only from 3 February 1288, when both cities were in the same Guelph league.

In 1318 there were conflicts with Pisa and the noble Appiani for the control of the castles of Valle and Montioni Vecchio, which resolved with political compromises between the parties with the payment of an annual tribute to the Bishop of Massa.

== Economy of the Republic of Massa ==
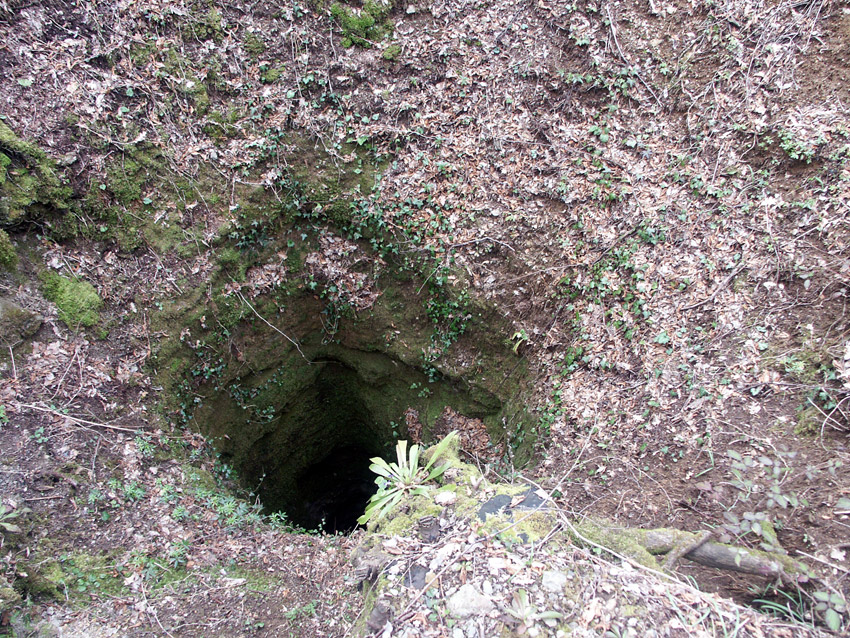
Ancient mining pozzino of the Stregaio Valley, testimony of the medieval mining activity that marked the territory of the Republic of Massa

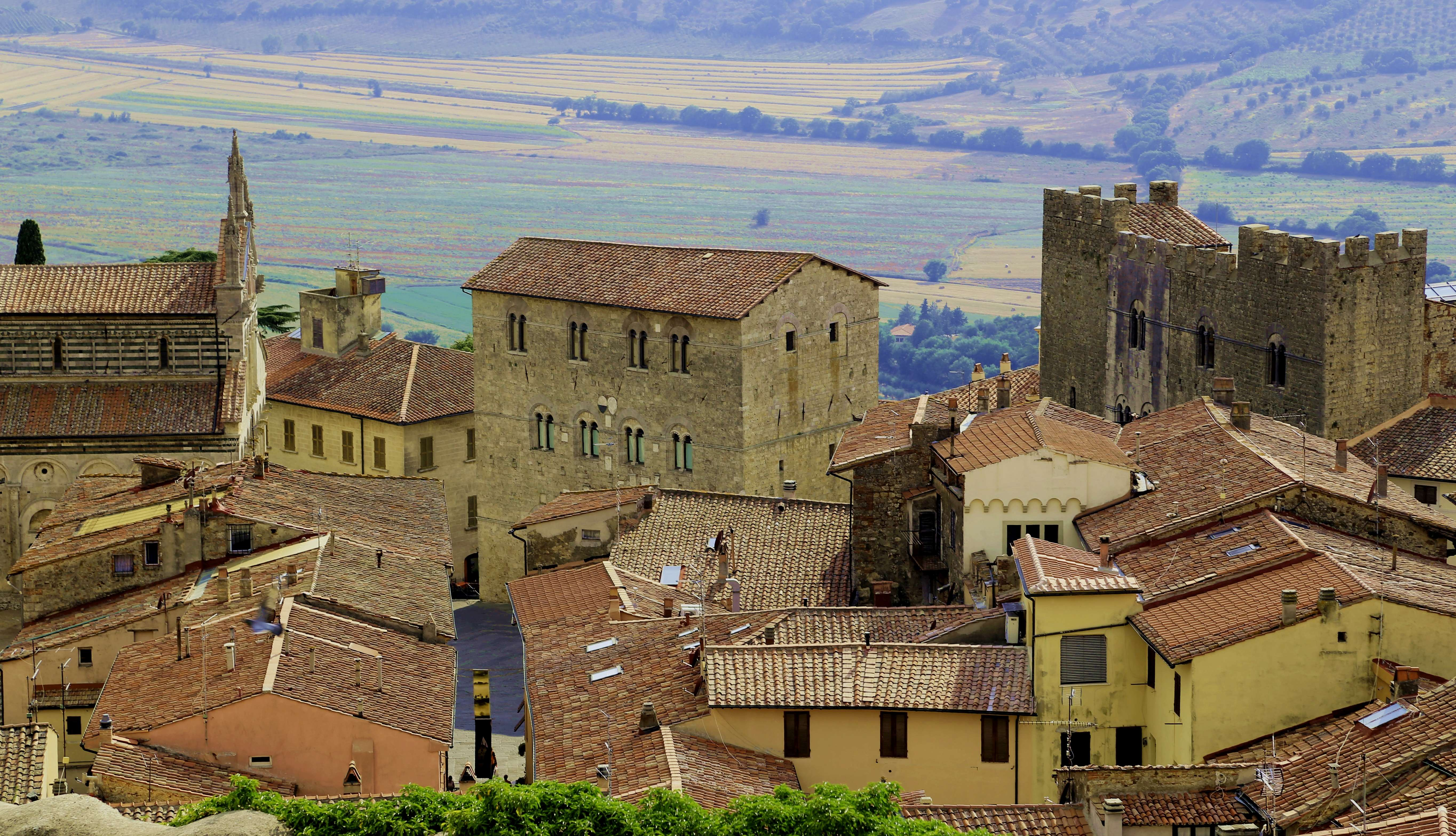
The Cathedral of San Cerbone, the Palazzo del Podestà and the Palazzo Comunale, dominate the valley at the foot of Massa di Maremma.

The territory of the countryside of the Republic of Massa was shaped by mining and metallurgical activities. These extremely complex activities needed a regulatory structure for production to work efficiently. During the thirteenth century the need arose to create an official text in order to collect the customs and information that had accumulated over centuries of mining. This citizen will led to the drafting of the Massetian Mining Code, of such importance for the legislation of the local economy to be included in the municipal statute of Massa Marittima of 1311–1325. The Code represents one of the oldest mining legislation documents in Europe, having been drawn up before 1294, younger only than that of Trento (1227), Hierges and Iglau (1249).

The extractive legislation of Massa represented the model of inspiration for similar documents of the other Tuscan powers, such as the 14th century Sienese Code and the Pisan code of 1302 relating to the Sardinian mines of Iglesias and the iron mines of the Island of Elba.

The meticulous organization had to guarantee the Massa's mines a rational production, without interruptions of the workings and with a high quality of the extracted metals. The magistri montis of the municipality of Massa supervised the excavations, while other municipal officers, including the guerchi, supervised the marketing of the finished product and its intermediate processing. In order to be able to bear the heavy expenses necessary for the metal production activity, mining companies were set up, in which entrepreneurs and miners participated for share capital. The accounting of the whole procedure was then officially registered in the accounting books of the community of Massa.

In the event that a citizen had discovered a new mineral deposit, it would have been his right to be able to derive profits from its exploitation. To enjoy this right, it was mandatory to report the deposit with a particular cross-shaped sign, to be placed where the excavations would begin (within a maximum of three days). Although the Mining Code recognized anyone the right to open a mine (at a minimum distance of 20 meters from the pre-existing ones), it obliged the discoverer not to suspend the works for more than a month and three days, under penalty of losing all rights on the deposit discovered.

== Currency ==
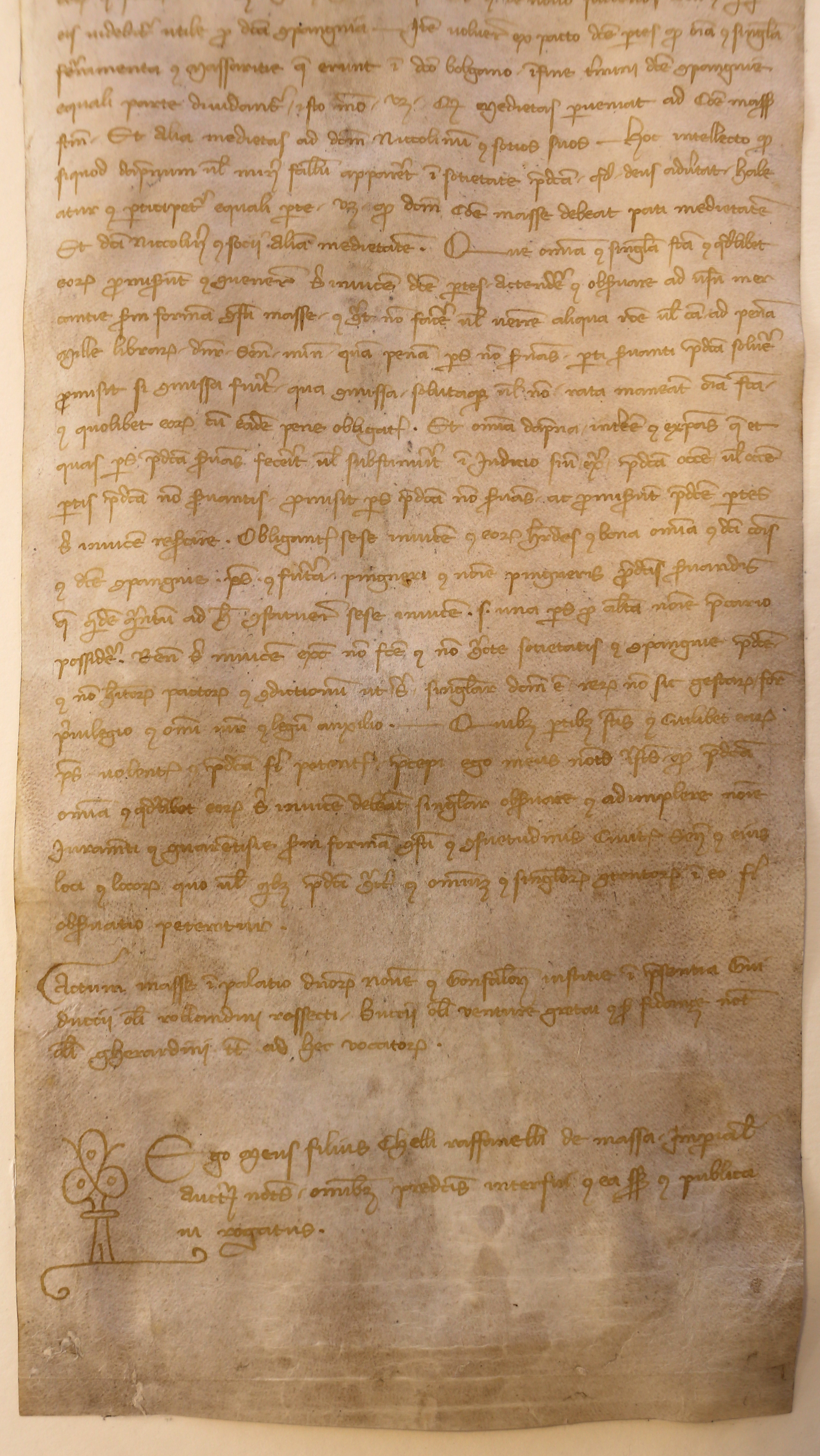
The act of institution of the mint of Massa di Maremma of 11 April 1317, with the deed of ser Meo di Chello Raffanelli and the representative of the municipality Muccio del fu Buonaventura Scussetti

=== Mint of Massa ===
Following the great commercial growth that involved Massa in the thirteenth century, it was decided to beat its own currency as it had already been done for some time in the other Tuscan republics. On 11 April 1317, in the town hall, a contract was drawn up between some members of the Benzi family, rich Sienese merchants of the Wool Guild, represented by Niccolino di Giacomino and the Municipality of Massa, represented by the mayor Muccio of the late Buonaventura Scussetti, to start a company whose purpose is to beat money. The Benzi undertook to provide the necessary equipment for the opening of the Mint of Massa while the Municipality of Massa undertook to purchase a building to be made available to the nascent Mint. The contract shows that for the fees relating to typing, for the weight characteristics and for the title of the massane coins, those in force in the Sienese mint were taken, for example.

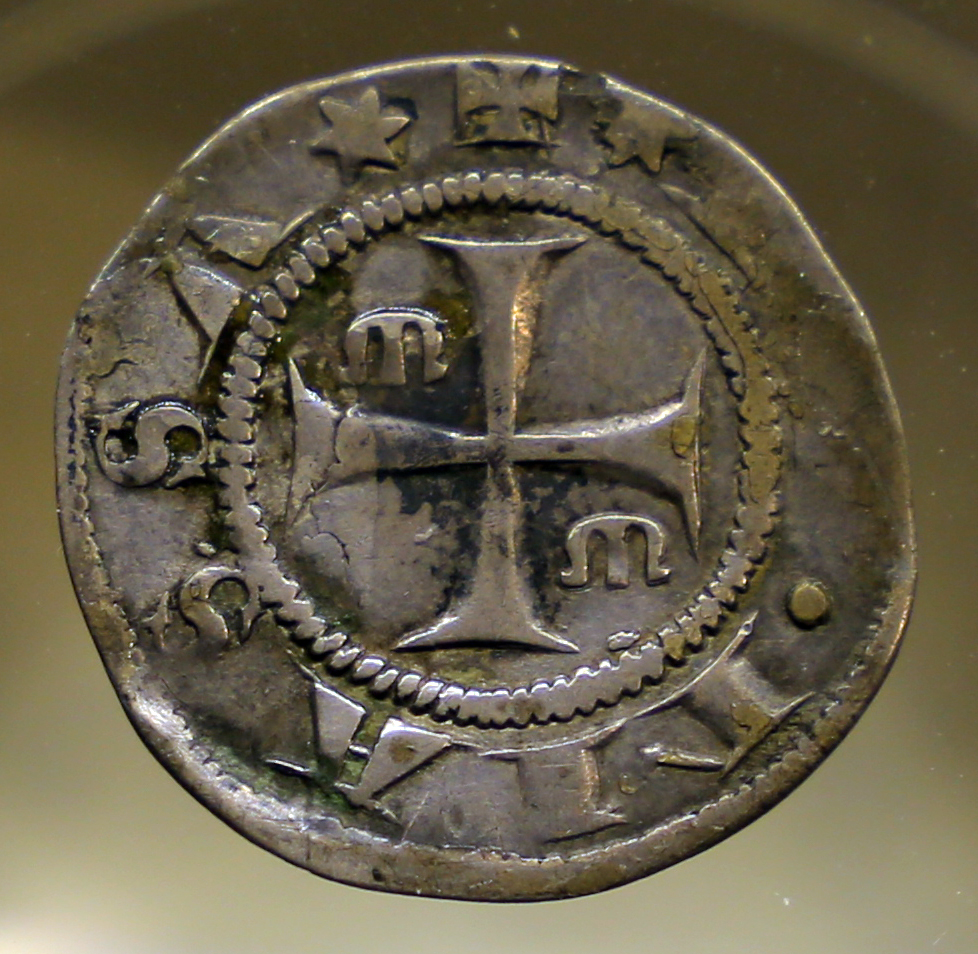
Coin of the Republic of Massa: the Grosso agontano massano da 20 denari (1317-1318)

It was established that the citizens of Masseto who had owned silver mines, would have to bring their metal to the nascent municipal mint to obtain the equivalent in money, from which a small percentage was used to sustain the costs of the mint. The profit generated by this mechanism would go in part to the zecchiere and in part to the municipality of Massa.

The mint of the Republic of Massa was located in the Mint Palace (in the current via Norma Parenti) and was certainly active for a year, until May 1318. However, there are documents of payments made in the Massa currency until the end of 1319.

=== Coins of Massa Marittima ===
The mint was opened by the authority of the Municipality with the aim of minting three types of coins: the large twenty-denier silver, the six-denier silver gross and the small mixture. Currently, two variants of the big money are known, three variants of the Small money and no gross, which was also absent in the monetary circulation of the time. It was probably decided not to coin it for the lack of luck that the coinage of this type of coin had had in other cities.

To avoid possible differences with the Sienese ally, it was decided to use weight and alloy equivalent to the coins produced in Siena, so as to allow their normal use in transactions with neighboring nations.

The Grosso massano therefore enters a period in which the silver coinage was already in its descending parable. In fact, from 1252, the year of minting the Golden Florin, the gold coinage replaced the silver one, establishing itself in the great international and national transactions, effectively limiting the silver coins (mineral of which the territory of Massa was rich) to payment of smaller amounts.

The coins of Massa that we have witness to today are: the Grosso agontano massano of 20 denarii and the small Denaro.

- Grosso agontano massano da 20 denari: The large 20-den Agano massano carries in the field of the straight a cross in a striped crown set aside in the first quarter and in its opposite by Gothic M. Locally it is thought that these two M stand for Massa Metallorum or "Mass of metals". In the legend, instead, there are two six-pointed stars with a full circled body on the sides of a small patent cross and the word DE • MASSA. The reverse side, on the other hand, bears in the field the effigy of Saint Cerbone, patron of Massa, nimbated and with a miter in a striped crown. The reverse legend, on the other hand, reads + S '• CE RBON', with the letter C open and the letter N reversed.
- Denaro piccolo: One of the three variants of the small mixed money carries a Gothic M in the field of the obverse in a striped crown and in the legend + DE • MASSA, with a five-pointed star with a hollow circled body. Instead the reverse side bears in the field the bust of Saint Cerbone, protector of the city, nimbato and mitrato, represented while blessing with his right hand, all in a striped crown. The reverse legend has + * S * CERBON '*, with the letter C closed and the letter N inverted.

== See also ==
- Massa Marittima
- Repubblica di Siena
- Colline Metallifere
- Maremma
- Ports of the Republic of Siena

== Bibliography ==
- Renato Betti, Alessio Montagano, Massimo Sozzi, R. Villoresi, Grossi da sei e da venti denari di Arezzo, Firenze, Massa Marittima, Siena e Volterra in un documento orvietano del 1318, Rivista Italiana di Numismatica, vol. CV, 2004, pp. 366–391.
- Galli da Modigliana, Stefano (1871). Memorie storiche di Massa Marittima, parte prima. Olinto Comparini.
- Galli da Modigliana, Stefano (1871). Memorie storiche di Massa Marittima, parte seconda. Olinto Comparini.
- Roberto Farinelli, Riccardo Francovich, Guida alla Maremma medievale. Itinerari di archeologia nella provincia di Grosseto, Nuova Immagine, Siena, 2000.
- Enrico Lombardi, Massa Marittima e il suo territorio nella storia e nell'arte, Edizioni Cantagalli, Siena, 1985.
- Luigi Petrocchi, Massa Marittima. Arte e storia, Venturi, Firenze, 1900.
- Bruno Santi, "Massa Marittima", in Guida storico-artistica alla Maremma. Itinerari culturali nella provincia di Grosseto, Nuova Immagine, Siena, 1995.
- Massimo Sozzi, L'agontano di Massa di Maremma, in "L’agontano. Una moneta d’argento per l’Italia medievale" a cura di Lucia Travaini, Atti del Convegno in ricordo di Angelo Finetti, Trevi (Perugia), 11-12 ottobre 2001, Perugia, 2003, pp. 111–140.
- Massimo Sozzi, Moèris Fiori, Massa Marittima (Grosseto; Toscana), in "Le zecche italiane fino all’Unità", a cura di Lucia Travaini, vol. I, Istituto Poligrafico e Zecca dello Stato, Roma, 2011, pp. 846–848.
