= Coinage of the Republic of Siena =

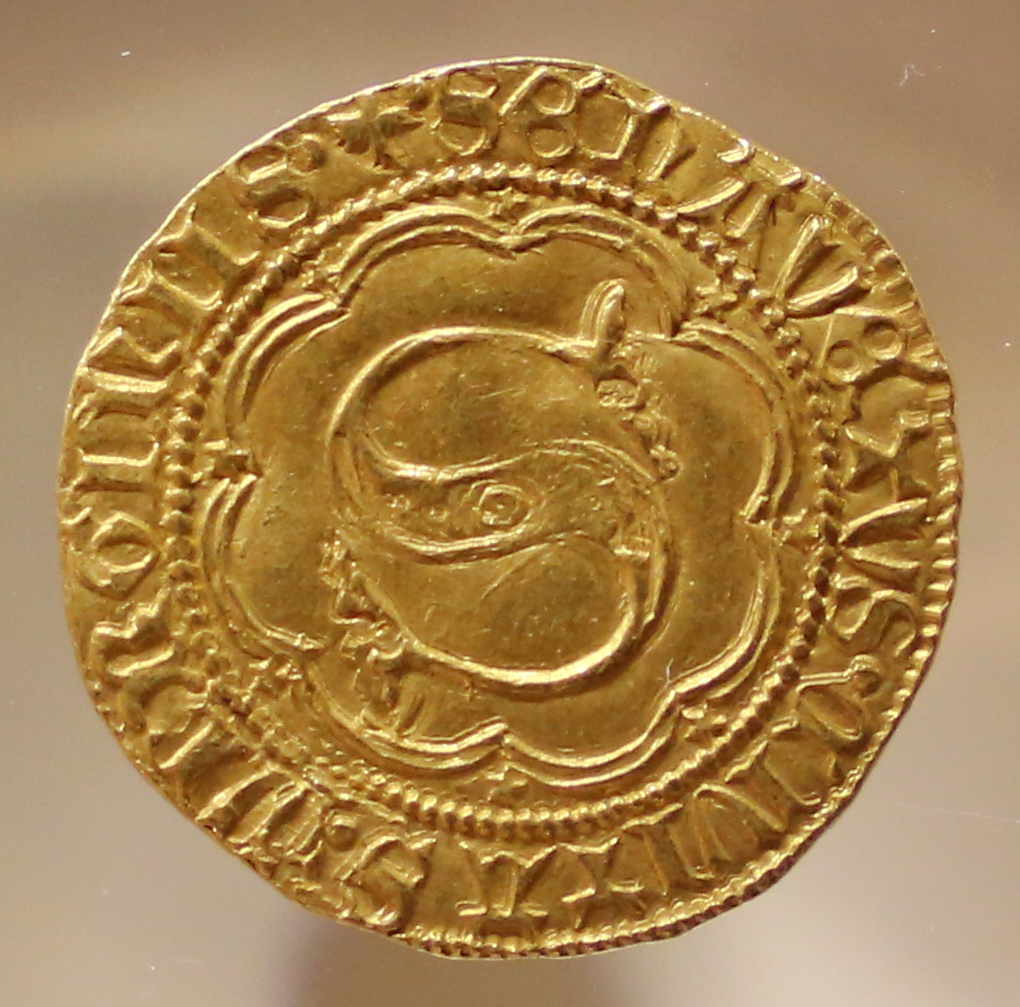
Sanese d'oro, coined by the Sienese mint after the resolution of the city General Council of 21 April 1376, was the first gold coin issued by the Republic of Siena.

The Coinage of the Republic of Siena are the coins minted by the Republic of Siena from the second half of the 12th century until the fall of the Republic of Siena exiled in Montalcino (Italy) in 1559, following the Peace of Cateau-Cambrésis.

== History and characteristics of the Sienese coinage ==
The slow decline of the imperial authority and the decline of episcopal power led to the birth of a secular government in Siena. The city, which had become a free commune with a strong economic growth, now developed in its internal institutions, could not ignore the advantages derived from the management of its own city mint. Therefore, in the twelfth century, the rising Sienese Republic was pressing for obtaining the right to mint coins.

On March 22, 1176, the cities of Siena and Florence, still without their own coinage, entered into a monetary agreement and mutual undertaking to use the currency of Pisa for their commercial transactions, but the agreement did not last for long. On 2 February 1180 there was an official agreement between Siena and the archbishop of Mainz for the latter's release from the imprisonment of the Marquis Corrado di Monferrato. The high prelate was also an imperial chancellor of Frederick I and under oath he undertook to obtain from the emperor the confirmation of the Sienese coin, in exchange for the payment of the ransom of 400 lire by the city. This clue therefore suggests that coins were already minted in a clandestine way in Siena before 1180. Although the concession diploma has never been traced, there is an indirect confirmation of the imperial authorization to mint from a document of Henry VI dated May 1186 in which the city of Siena was deprived of the possibility of minting coins after being besieged (right then returned five months later).

The first existing documentation of the Sienese currency is dated 11 January 1182, thanks to a license to build a monastery issued by the bishop of the city, who was charged a penalty of 100 lire in Sienese money. The Republic of Siena has always traditionally excluded from coins any reference to the emperor who gave it the concession. The Sienese coinage is instead characterized by the repetition of the same iconographies over the centuries: depicting an S in the front field and a cross in the back field. These iconography will continue until the end of the 15th century with the sole exception of the Bolognino coined with a resolution of 1450.

Starting from the 16th century, the Sienese she-wolf with Senio and Aschio, the Madonna and finally the shield of the Republic of Siena with LIBERTAS written on it was minted on the coins. Even in the legends there is a centuries-old repetitiveness of the representations: up to 1279 there is the inscription SENA VETVS on the front and ALFA ET ω on the back, while from 1279 to the 16th century on the front SENA VET CIVITAS VIRGINIS and on the back field ALFA ED O PRINCIPIV ET FINIS (phrase of biblical origin).

From the sixteenth century there are some variations in SENA VETVS on the front field and CIVITAS VIRGINIS on the back. Following the victory of the Republic of Siena in the battle of Porta Camollia in 1526, the legends on the back will become MANVS TVE DOMINE FECERVNT ME and SALVAVIT NOS DESTERA TVA, respectively in the Sienese giulio coin and in the half-giulio.

With the fall of Siena and the birth of the Republic of Siena exiled in Montalcino, the legends changed completely on the Montalcino coins minted from 1556 to 1559. Although the loss of the capital had already occurred in 1555, the Montalcino legends underline the survival of the Republic with the words RESPUBLICA SENENSIS IN MONTEILICINO, referring both to the Virgin (TUO CONFISI PRAESIDIO), and to the ally Henry II King of France (HENRICO II AUSPICE).

== See also ==
- Republic of Siena
- Ports of the Republic of Siena
- History of coins in Italy

== Bibliography ==
- B. Paolozzi Strozzi, G. Toderi, F. Toderi, Le monete della Repubblica Senese, Milano 1992.
- D. Promis, Monete della Repubblica di Siena, Torino, 1868.
- E. Gariel, Les monnaies royales de France sous la race carolingienne, Strasburgo 1883.
- Agnolo di Tura del Grasso, Cronaca senese, in Cronache senesi, Bologna, 1931–1937
- D. Herlihy, Pisan coinage and the monetary development of Tuscany, 1150–1250, in American Numismatic Society, Museum Notes, VI, New York, 1954.
