= Noveschi =

The Noveschi or the IX were a mercantile-banking oligarchy that ruled the Italian city-state of Siena from 1287 to 1355 AD. They oversaw the period of Siena's greatest stability and prosperity in the Medieval era with numerous new construction sites opened such as the Siena Cathedral and the Palazzo Pubblico. A significant contributor to the instability that felled their regime was the 1348 outbreak of the Black Death.
