= Ports of the Republic of Siena =

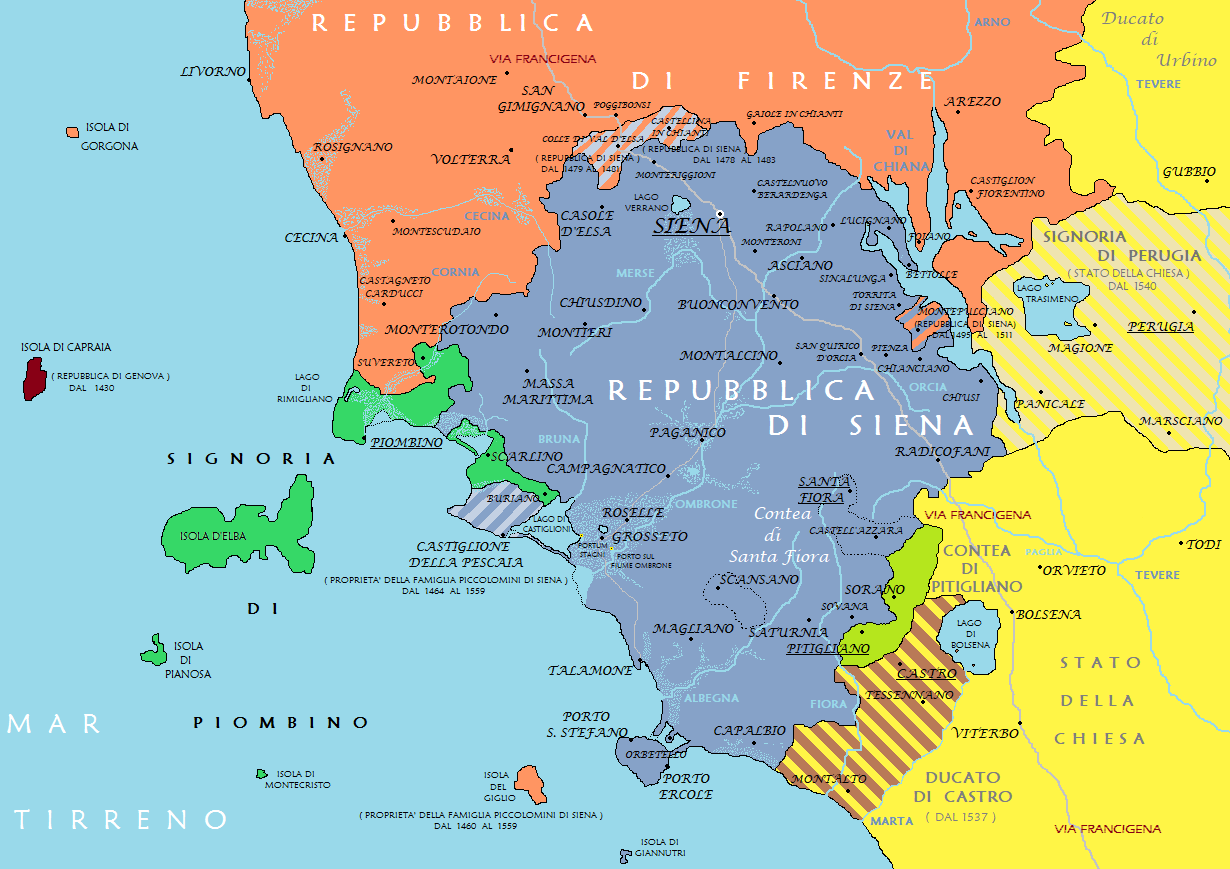
Borders of the Republic of Siena in the Maremma area between the XV and XVI centuries

The Republic of Siena in its progressive territorial growth saw its borders expanding especially in the territories of southern Tuscany in the current province of Grosseto. The possession of an "access to the sea" by Siena was therefore a natural continuation of its expansionary and commercial policy in the Maremma with the conquest of the ports of Talamone, Porto Ercole and Porto Santo Stefano.

In order to ensure access to maritime traffic and a competitive sales network, Siena already tried to secure the use of the Grosseto river port in the 13th century. However, the port, swept away during the 14th century by the violent flood that removed the course of the Ombrone from the city, never had any development, also due to the incorrect economic policy of Siena and the lack of a productive background.

== History ==
=== Purchase and growth of Talamone ===
Among that vain folk wilt thou see them there,

which hopes in Talamone, and will waste

more hope on it than on the Diàna quest;

but still more will the admirals invest.

— Divine Comedy, Purgatorio XIV, vv. 151-154.

In May 1303, the abbot of the monastery of San Salvatore, Friar Ranieri, arrived in Siena proposing to the government of the Nine the purchase of the lands belonging to the monastery (even if they were then occupied militarily by the Counts of Santa Fiora), including Talamone and Castiglion di Val d'Orcia.

After a difficult negotiation, the purchase contract was signed on 10 September 1303. At the price of 900 gold florins the port of Talamone, the Contrada di Valentina and Castiglion di Val d'Orcia were sold to the Republic of Siena which also placed the monastery under its protection.

Coastal possessions of the Republic of Siena from the purchase of Talamone to 1559

The possession of an outlet to the sea was extensively celebrated in Siena, hoping to increase its trade in this way, despite being affected by the negative consequences that the failure of the Gran Tavola bank of the Bonsignori had caused in relations with France and northern Italy.

In May 1304 a bailiff was established for three Sienese citizens who took care of the needs of the port of Talamone and communicated them to Siena.

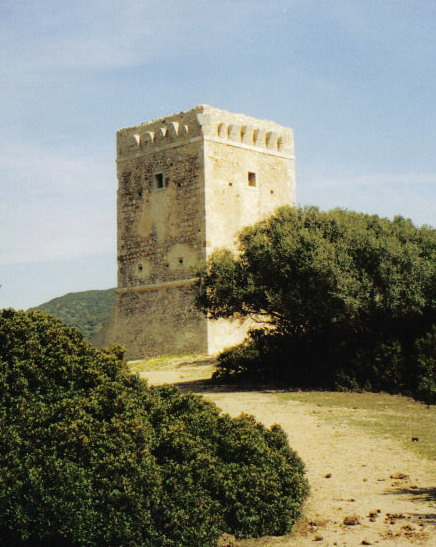
Tower of Collelungo built by the Republic of Siena to improve the defensive system of the coast next to Grosseto

At this point, it was necessary to decide the strategy to be followed regarding the port. The General Council of the Bell was divided on two opposing ideas represented respectively by Mignanello dei Mignanelli and Cione di Alemanno dei Piccolomini. The first claimed that the government of the Nine should have full authority in the work, while the second claimed that it was necessary to agree with the Genoese for the proper development of the port given the inexperience of the Sienese in maritime affairs.

It was decided to avoid external interference by directly managing the seaport.

From 1305, restoration work was carried out for the harbor walls, roads were improved, a bridge was built and the quarterdeck was rebuilt while, to avoid possible hostilities with the Counts of Santa Fiora, the boundaries were precisely established. The following year a ban was placed for the salt evaporation pond that should have provided half of the product to the Commune because it was his property.

On the recommendation of three Sienese citizens sent to the site, in 1309 improvements were made both to the castle and to the port to make it easier for sailors to land thanks to wooden piers, as well as to start work on a lighthouse.

Following the adhesion to the Tuscan Guelph League, made possible thanks to the political change imposed by the Nine that removed the city from the empire, Siena then found itself to be allied with Florence. Given the growing enmities existing towards the Ghibelline Pisa, the Florentine government stipulated an agreement on 17 August 1311 with the Sienese Republic for the passage of all their goods by sea from Talamone.

=== Difficulty in managing and granting the Talamone port ===
With the descent of the Emperor Henry in Tuscany there were various reprisals against the Florentine merchants in Genoa and, probably for the same reason of damaging the Florentine trade, some Sienese Ghibelline exiles attacked Talamone in 1312; in that moment without defenses.

It took the Republic of Siena two years to regain control of the port.

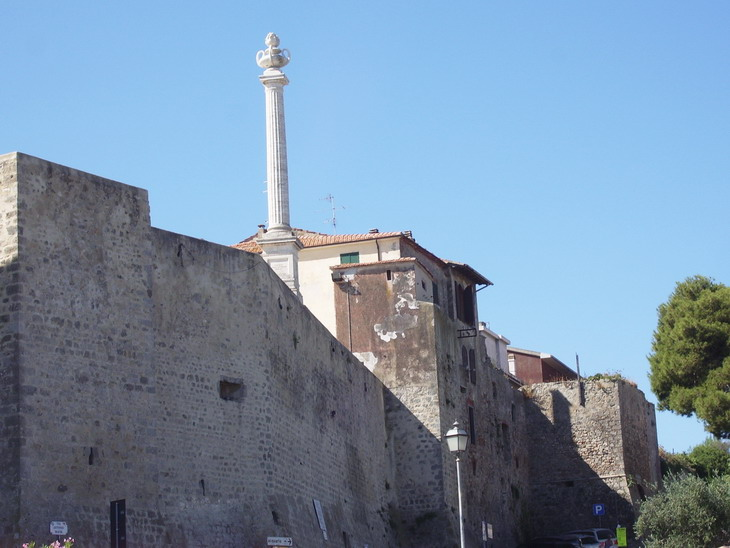
The Walls of Talamone were restored and improved as early as 1305 at the behest of the Republic of Siena

However, already in 1320 there was a new aggression, this time on the part of Genoese exiles, who sacked Talamone with a large quantity of wheat bound for Siena, burdened at that time with a famine.

In the following years the Municipality of Siena committed itself to taking the necessary measures to avoid new foreign incursions, together with the granting of privileges to the inhabitants of the port in order to encourage the growth of the Talamone population. Despite the efforts, the population and the safety of the airport turned out to be a failure also considering the pressing presence of malaria. The port was forced to suffer a new hostile occupation in 1328 by the army of the king of Sicily who tried to take Grosseto as well.

Given the impossibility of managing the port in a fruitful way, the government of the Nine opted for the concession of Talamone for rent to the Duke of Calabria through his ducal vicar.

In 1339 the port was granted for eight years to the Genoese Manfredi del Fiesco, count of Lavagna. However, due to some breaches of the agreements, the contract was canceled and the maritime port returned to the direct control of Siena.

Following new clashes against the Pisans due to the influence on Lucca, Florence renewed the agreements with the Republic of Siena for the rights of Florentine merchants in the port of Talamone in 1340; situation that was repeated in 1356.

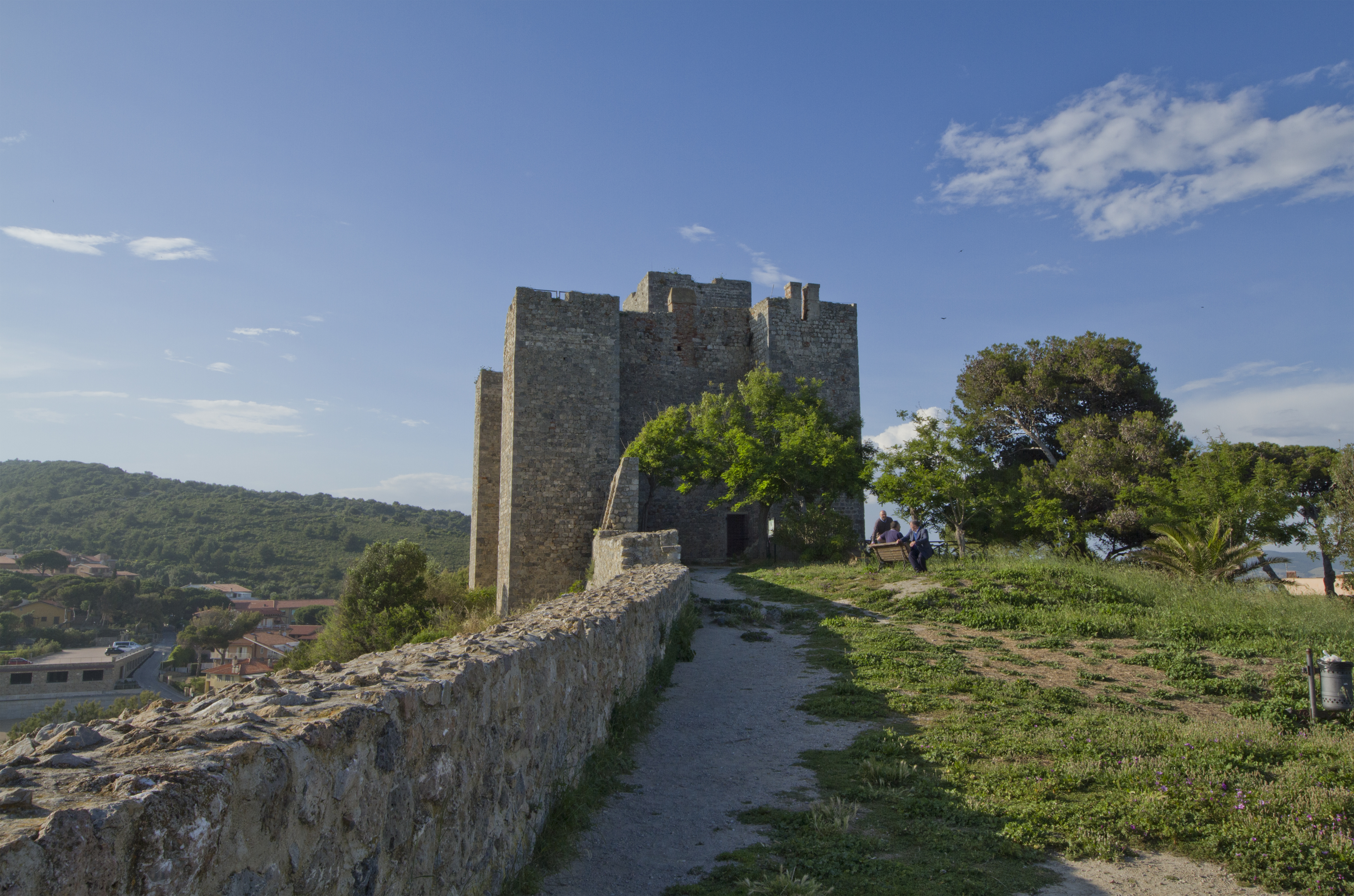
Medieval fortress of Talamone

Upon learning of the treaty with Florence, Pisa threatened to occupy the port and tried several times to attack it, failing thanks to Florence's commitment to protect its maritime trade.

However, once the peace agreement was signed with Pisa in 1364, the Florentine merchants preferred to leave the more distant Sienese port in favor of the Pisan one, despite the pressure exerted by Siena to maintain Florence's commercial traffic.

In a period of strong political instability in Siena, more privileges were therefore decided for anyone who wanted to live in Talamone and cultivated the land and the passing merchants, so as to remedy the damage caused by the loss of Florentine maritime traffic. The entire area of the Sienese Maremma was however seriously neglected and due to the strong emigration the population of Talamone, Magliano and Grosseto was by now decimated.

In this situation in 1375 the Sienese coast suffered several looting by Pisan troops, which later occupied Talamone together with the papal militias. Due to contrasts between Siena and the papacy due to the support given to Perugia in the riots against the Papal State, the papal occupation lasted until 1378, the year in which the Republic of Siena regained control of the port by paying a large sum of money to Urban VI.

The following year, due to conflicts with Pisa and Genoa for control of Sardinia, the Catalans concluded a treaty with the Republic of Siena for the use of the port of Talamone, guaranteeing their merchants the same rights that were granted to the Florentines, but with lower duties.

Once the Sienese port was left by the Catalans, failing to cover the defense and guards with maritime trade, in 1385 it was decided to grant the port to a company that also took care of maintaining the defensive structures.

In 1399 various measures were approved for the rehabilitation of the Maremma and the reclamation of the lands of Grosseto, so as to finally take full advantage of the great fertility of the agricultural areas.

With the conquest of Livorno in 1404 and that of Pisa in 1406 by Florence, the modernization of Talamone became more pressing for Siena to avoid the decadence of the port. In those years King Ladislaus of Naples tried to bring the Republic of Siena to his part in anti-Florentine function, but given the rejection of the Sienese the king of Naples attacked Talamone together with the Genoese in 1410. With great effort and with the help of Florence and France, Siena succeeded in regaining the port and the castle in December of the same year.

=== Conquest of Porto Ercole and Porto Santo Stefano ===
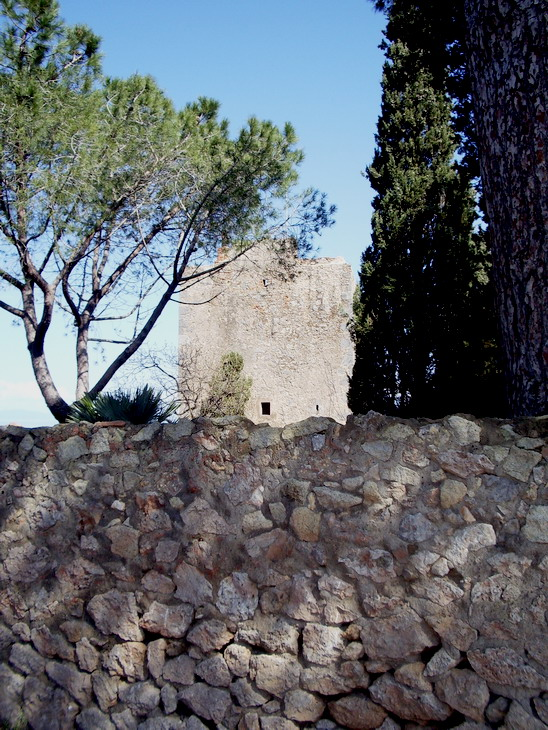
Tower of Lividonia of Porto Santo Stefano designed by the Republic of Siena in 1548

Porto Ercole and the territory of Monte Argentario, including the lesser Porto Santo Stefano, were conquered by the Republic of Siena at the time of the coming in Tuscany of the King of Naples Ladislaus in 1409.

The damages caused by the Genoese occupation were huge and the General Council of the Bell approved in 1411 that the necessary repair work was done, and the same happened in 1416 with Orbetello recently conquered.

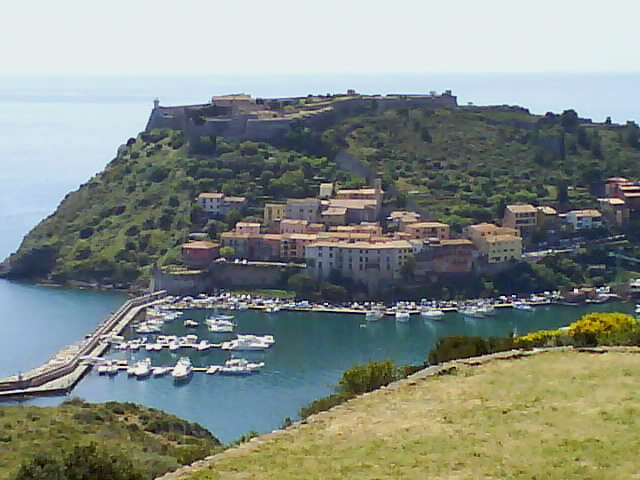
Porto Ercole with the fortress wanted by the Aldobrandeschi and then cured and enlarged under the Republic of Siena

The return of the Catalans to the Sienese port in 1436 was a positive event and, with the treaty signed by the parties, the Republic of Siena undertook to maintain the roads to Grosseto in good condition as well as the bridge of the port. The trade could flourish again and the following year the visit of Prince Alfonso of Aragon was also recorded.

Given the huge expenses that brought the Ercole Port to the Municipality of Siena, in 1441 it was given in concession to Agnolo Morosini with the latter's commitment to build fortifications and defensive structures both in the airport and in the area of Monte Argentario.

In 1460 the territory was granted to a commercial company of Sienese citizens. They committed to Siena to make the area of Porto Ercole habitable (by granting the inhabitants the same privileges as the citizens of Talamone), building a new tower and even a warehouse.

Given the poor condition of Porto Ercole, the concession to the commercial company was withdrawn by the Bell Council in 1474. The Republic sent guard and two lords to deal with the needs of the airport more carefully and to solve the problem of lack of housing for citizens.

On 30 January 1474 there was the only document of a Sienese ship, built in one of the ports of the Sienese Maremma by the merchant Francesco Benedetti da Perpignano who obtained a license from the Municipality to hoist the flag of the Republic of Siena.

=== Decline of the Republic of Siena ===
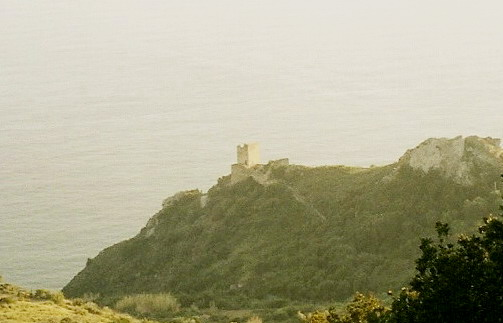
Coastal tower of the Maddalena, built at the behest of the Republic of Siena during the fifteenth century to strengthen the defensive system of the western slope of Monte Argentario

In 1476 a serious plague struck the ports of Talamone and Porto Ercole, decimating the population of the entire Grosseto area, subsequently impoverished by the pause of the Neapolitan royal army in those lands that were just repopulating.

From 1480 the Republic decided to intervene on the ports trying to stimulate the return of the emigrated citizens during the plague. In this period Porto Ercole experienced a good commercial flow thanks to the trade of wool cloths to the east by Sienese merchants.

To solve security problems, in 1489 Siena sent its Muslim consul to Constantinople so that the Sultan of the Ottoman Empire drove the many pirates who damaged the cities and ports from the Maremma.

In the first few years of the 16th century the Republic of Siena sold, for the price of 4,500 florins, all the revenues of the ports of Talamone and Porto Ercole for ten years to Alessandro di Galgano Bichi, while the use of the lands of Monte Argentario was bought by the Spedale of S. Maria della Scala of Siena.

In 1507, during his lordship, Pandolfo Petrucci bought the domain of Monte Argentario for 34,000 gold florins.

Taking advantage of a period of strong political instability in the Republic of Siena, the Genoese commander Andrea Doria occupied Talamone in 1527, and afterwards also Orbetello and Porto Ercole fell. The occupation of Orbetello and Talamone did not last long because the Sienese army supported by the population managed to recover the two cities.

Since the Sienese could not take Porto Ercole by force, the Commune of Siena insisted with great insistence on Pope Clement VII that he would return the lands occupied by force. Not obtaining positive responses and given the prolongation of the negotiations, the Republic decided to attack the port of call in 1530, managing to take back the port thanks to the commander Cincio Corso.

Fearing an imminent war against the Emperor or against the Pope, the Commune had the towns and the castles of the Maremma visited by the architect Baldassarre Peruzzi and Antonmaria Lari who were in charge of strengthening the walls of Porto Ercole, Grosseto and Talamone in 1532 and in 1541.

The fleet of Khayr al-Din Barbarossa, arrived in Italy to help the king of France, sacked and captured Montiano, Talamone and Porto Ercole. The plundered lands were ceded to the king of France who, after offering them in vain to the Pope (who refused them because he supported the Spanish presence in Italy) decided to withdraw from these lands after setting fire to Porto Ercole and its fortress.

During the last decade of the Republic of Siena, from 1545 to 1555, the restoration of the walls and the fortifications of the ports of Talamone and Porto Ercole were continuous.

During the Siena War where the Sienese and French armies faced each other against the Florentine and Spanish armies, besieged Siena on August 2, 1554 and surrendered the city in April 1555, Porto Ercole still remained to be conquered, where the French commander Charles de Carbonnières, after having awaited the arrival of Marshal Piero Strozzi, he surrendered on June 18, 1555.

The ports that were of the Republic of Siena for more than two centuries, became part of the nascent State of the Presidi in 1557 at the behest of Philip II king of Spain.

== Sienese ports in mass art and culture ==
- In the fresco Effects of Good Government in the city, present in the Sala dei Nove of the Palazzo Pubblico of Siena, the beginning of the writing "Talamone", truncated in the terminal part, is still visible. Ambrogio Lorenzetti had in fact drawn the Sienese countryside to the sea in 1339, which at the time in the countryside of Siena meant the outpost of Talamone. The work, however, has undergone a fifteenth-century remake in the right margin, on a triangular surface roughly defined on the side that goes from the penultimate ceiling beam to the lower right margin. At the time of the changes, in fact, the coastal area was infested with malaria and it was preferred to depict the countryside up to an anonymous lake, rather than to the sea.
- Talamone is also represented in the tablet. View of cities on the sea attributed to the same Ambrogio Lorenzetti and is probably the first experiment in depicting a landscape theme of European painting. The city is similar to medieval Siena, in an imaginary vision, with inconceivably high towers.
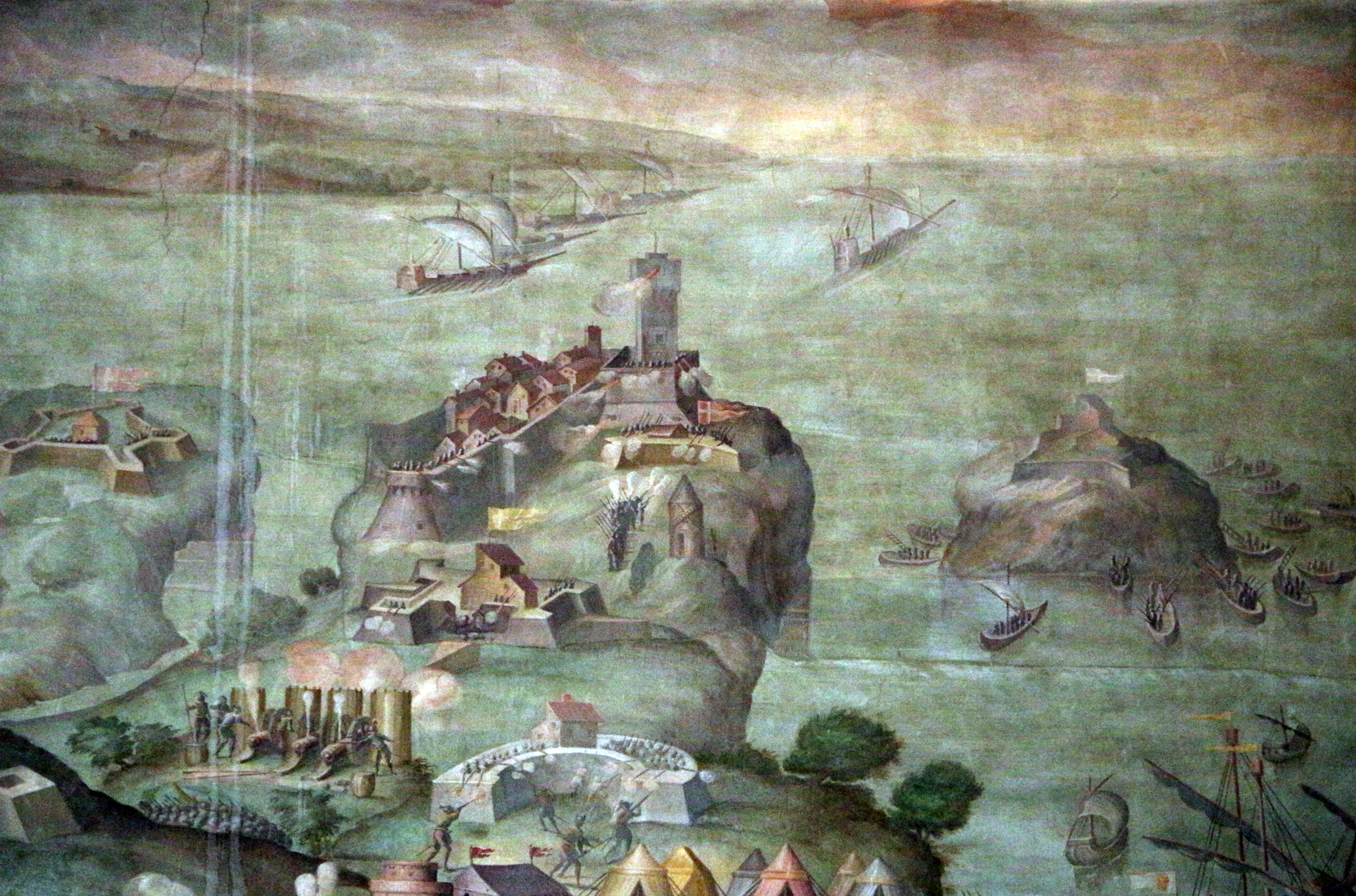
  Detail of the fresco by Giorgio Vasari The taking of Porto Ercole (1570). You can see the various fortresses of the Republic of Siena (including the one on the islet called Forte Ercoletto) during the siege of the Sienese port (in the middle of the fresco) of 1555.
- Porto Ercole is instead represented by Giorgio Vasari in the fresco The Taking of Porto Ercole, present in the Salone dei Cinquecento in Florence. With this work, Giorgio Vasari celebrated the conquest of the Sienese port on June 18, 1555 together with the greatest Florentine military victories, for the exaltation and glorification of the patron Cosimo I de Medici and his family.

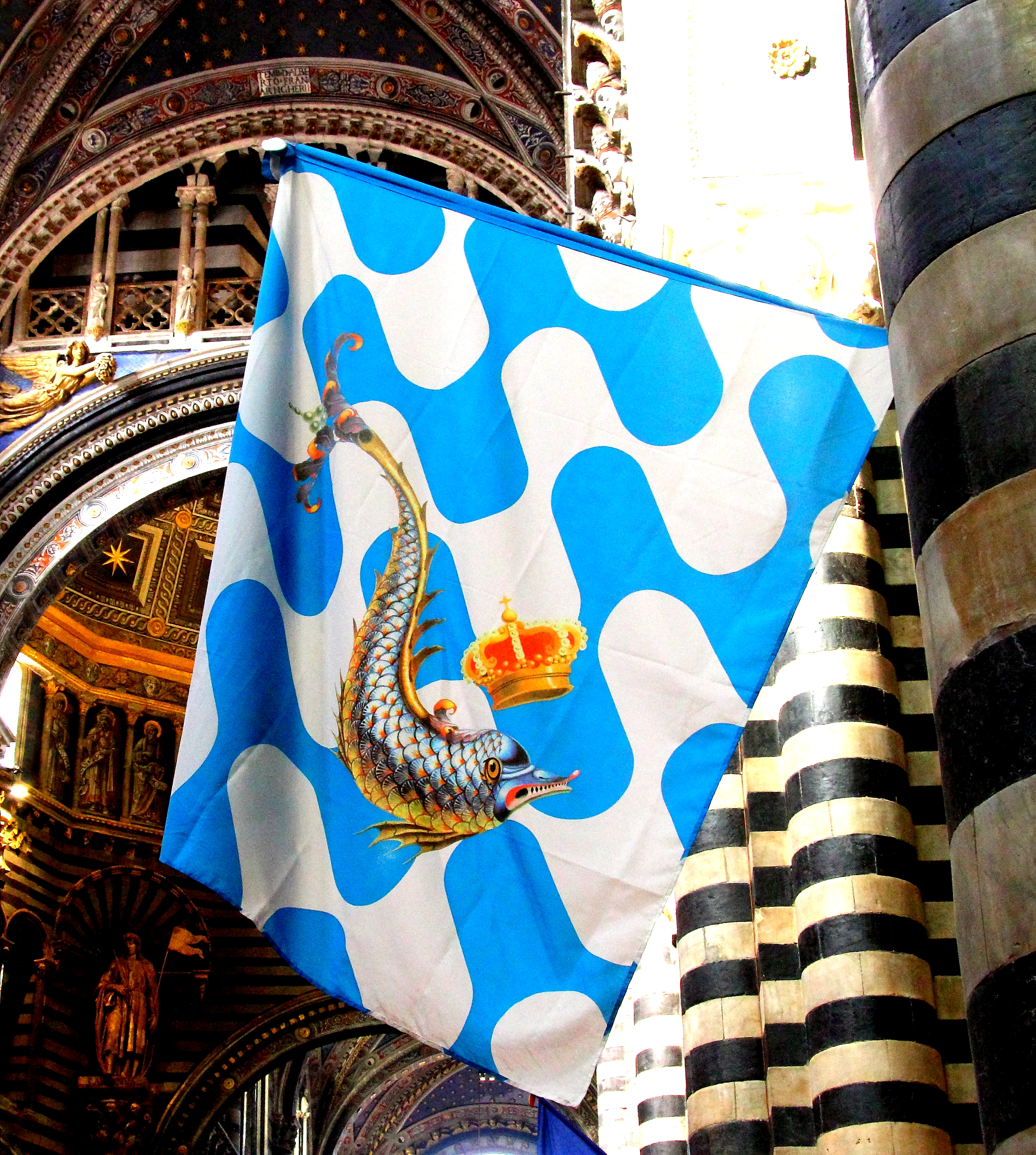
Flag of the Contrada Capitana dell'Onda in the Cathedral of Siena.

- According to its Statute, the Contrada Capitana of Onda still considers Talamone an integral part of its territory and its inhabitants, who are protectors, part of the people of the Contrada. The origins of the Contrada derive in fact from the aggregation of the peoples of the ancient Sienese military companies of Casato di Sotto and San Salvadore occurred in the fifteenth century, in charge of the defense of the coast of the Republic of Siena, whose main port was the town of Talamone.

== See also ==
- Republic of Siena
- Sienese School
- Guelphs and Ghibellines
- Grosseto
- Maremma
- Talamone
- Porto Ercole
- Porto Santo Stefano
- Orbetello
