= Republic of Siena =

Italian republic (1125–1555)

Republic of Siena Repubblica di Siena (Italian) Respublica Senensis (Latin)
- 1125–1555
- Flag (c. 1246) Coat of arms
- Motto: Libertas (Latin) Freedom
- Republic of Siena (in dark orange), on map of Italy at the close of the 15th century
- Capital: Siena
- Common languages: Italian; Tuscan; Latin
- Religion: Roman Catholicism
- Government: Oligarchic classical republic
  - 1125–1399: Constitutional republic
  - 1487–1512: Pandolfo Petrucci (first signore)
- History
  - Deposition of the bishop who ruled the city: 1125
  - Creation of the Governo dei Nove: 1287
  - Battle of San Romano: 1432
  - Battle of Marciano: 1554
  - Disestablished: 1555

Population
  - Estimate: 50,000–70,000 (Siena only) in the 14th century
- Currency: Senese d'oro, Quattrino
Preceded by
Bishop of Siena (within Tuscany)
March of Tuscany
Republic of Massa
Succeeded by
Duchy of Florence
State of the Presidi
- Today part of: Italy

The Republic of Siena (Italian: Repubblica di Siena, Latin: Respublica Senensis) was a historic state consisting of the city of Siena and southern Tuscany, Central Italy. It existed for over 400 years, from 1125 to 1555. During its existence, it gradually expanded throughout southern Tuscany and became one of the major economic powers of the Middle Ages. It was one of the most important commercial, financial and artistic centers in Europe.

From 1287 to 1355, during the rule of the Noveschi, the Republic experienced a period of great political and economic splendor: new buildings were commissioned, including that of the Cathedral of Siena, the Palazzo Pubblico, and a substantial part of the city walls completed. This government is in fact defined by historians as the "good governance".

A combination of economic decline, sparked by the Black Death, and political instability led to its absorption by the rival Duchy of Florence during the Italian War of 1551–1559. Despite resisting for 18 months, it surrendered on 21 April 1555, marking the end of the republic.

== History ==
=== Origins ===
The foundation of the Republic of Siena is traditionally dated to 1125, the year in which the last reigning representative of the Government of Bishops was deposed, at the time at the head of the city and the surrounding countryside. A consular government was appointed to administer the state in its early term. As in most of the medieval municipal cities, Siena too had the Consuls as its first development of the judiciary. In 1125 the office of Consul Sænensis was attributed to Manco.

=== Growth ===
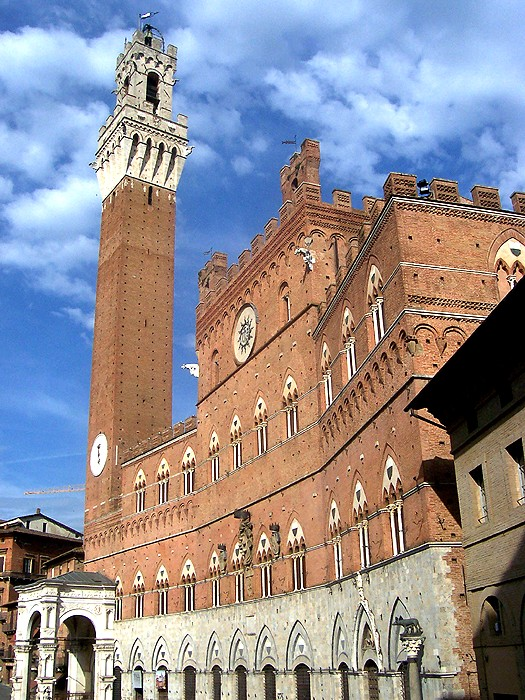
Palazzo Pubblico, the seat of the Republic's government

Siena prospered as a city-state, becoming a major centre of money lending and an important player in the wool trade. At first it was governed directly by its bishop, but episcopal power declined during the 12th century. The bishop was forced to concede a greater say in the running of the city to the nobility in exchange for their help during a territorial dispute with Arezzo, and this started a process which culminated in 1167 when the commune of Siena declared its independence from episcopal control. By 1179, it had a written constitution.

In 1286 the Nove ("the Nine") government was established to rule Siena. The Nove was backed by the Noveschi, a political party formed by the merchant families that sat on the council. Eventually, the Noveschi party grew to include not only members of the Nove council, but also many prominent noble families of the city. Under the guide of the Nove and the Noveschi, Siena grew in both economic and military dominance.

=== The Battle of Montaperti ===
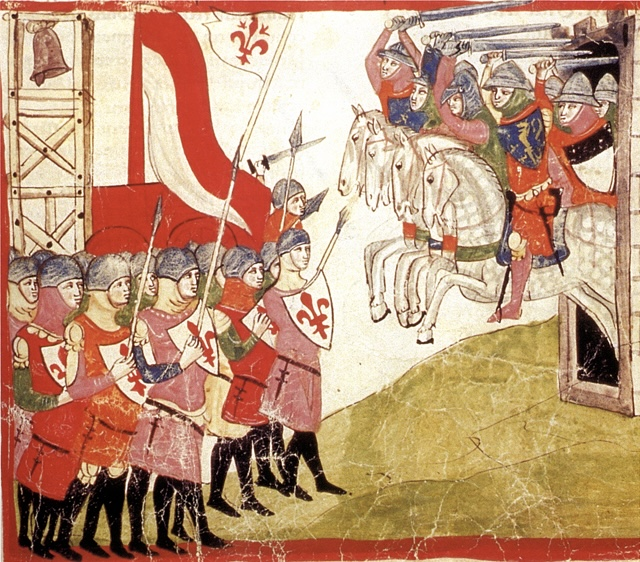
A miniature depicting the Battle of Montaperti, from the Nuova Cronica (14th century)

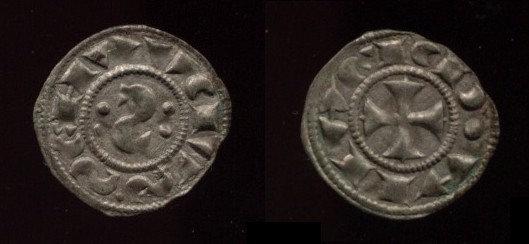
Medieval coin of the Republic of Siena (12th century)

In the 13th century, Siena was predominantly Ghibelline, in opposition to Florence's Guelph position (this conflict formed the backdrop for some of Dante Alighieri's Divine Comedy, completed in 1320).

On 4 September 1260 the Sienese Ghibellines, supported by the forces of King Manfred of Sicily, defeated the Florentine Guelphs in the Battle of Montaperti. Before the battle, the Sienese army of around 20,000 faced a much larger Florentine army of around 33,000. Prior to the battle, the entire city was dedicated to the Virgin Mary (this was done several times in the city's history, most recently in 1944 to guard the city from Allied bombs). The man given command of Siena for the duration of the war, Bonaguida Lucari, walked barefoot and bareheaded, a halter around his neck, to Siena Cathedral. Leading a procession composed of all the city's residents, he was met by all the clergy. Lucari and the bishop embraced to show the unity of church and state, then Lucari formally gave the city and contrade to the Virgin. Legend has it that a thick white cloud descended on the battlefield, giving the Sienese cover and aiding their attack. The reality was that the Florentine army launched several fruitless attacks against the Sienese army during the day, then when the Sienese army countered with their own offensive, traitors within the Florentine army killed the standard bearer and in the resulting chaos, the Florentine army broke up and fled the battlefield. Almost half the Florentine army (some 15,000 men) were killed as a result.

The period 1260–1355 has been characterized as a "golden age" in Siena.

=== Ports of the Republic of Siena ===
The Republic of Siena in its progressive territorial growth saw its borders expanding especially in the territories of southern Tuscany in the current province of Grosseto. The possession of an "access to the sea" by Siena was therefore a natural continuation of its expansionary and commercial policy in the Maremma with the conquest of the ports of Talamone, Porto Ercole and Porto Santo Stefano.

In order to ensure access to maritime traffic and a competitive sales network, Siena already tried to secure the use of the Grosseto river port in the 13th century. However, the port, swept away during the 14th century by the violent flood that removed the course of the Ombrone from the city, never had any development, also due to the incorrect economic policy of Siena and the lack of a productive background.

=== Decline ===
Siena was devastated by the Black Death of 1348, and also suffered from ill-fated financial enterprises. In 1355, with the arrival of Charles IV of Luxembourg in the city, the population rose and suppressed the government of the Nove council and expelled any family associated with the Noveschi party. They established a Dodici government (council of 12 nobles), assisted by another council with a popular majority. This form of government was short-lived, soon replaced by the Quindici ("The Fifteen") reformers in 1385, the Dieci ("The Ten", 1386–1387), Undici ("The Eleven", 1388–1398) and the Twelve Priors (1398–1399) who, in the end, gave the city's lordship to Gian Galeazzo Visconti, the Duke of Milan, in order to defend it from Florentine expansionism.

Five years later, the House of Visconti was expelled in 1404, and a new government of Ten Priors was established, this time in alliance with Florence against King Ladislaus of Naples. With the election of the Sienese Enea Silvio Piccolomini of the prominent Piccolomini noble family as Pope Pius II in 1458, the nobles who had been expelled due to association with the Noveschi party were allowed to return to the city.

In 1472 the Siena magistrates founded a "mount of piety", the Banca Monte dei Paschi di Siena, which would survive into the 21st century as "the world's oldest bank".

=== Petrucci era ===
The Noveschi returned to the city under Pandolfo Petrucci in 1487. Pandolfo slowly gathered many political offices and grew his influence until 1500, when with the execution of his father-in-law Niccolò Borghese for conspiracy to murder him, as well as with the support of Florence and of Alfonso of Calabria, Pandolfo was able to seize complete control of the city. Though an autocrat, Pandolfo brought Siena back to prosperity, favoring arts and sciences, as well as improving its economy. Pandolfo was succeeded by his son Borghese Petrucci. After only 4 years of rule, Borghese was ousted by his cousin, cardinal Raffaello Petrucci, helped by Pope Leo X. In the wake of more responsibilities from the Church, Raffaello was forced to cede the city to his nephew, Francesco Petrucci, who only ruled for a year before being ousted by Pandolfo's youngest son, Fabio. Fabio was exiled in 1525 by the Sienese people, marking the end of the Petrucci era.

=== End of the Republic ===
With the end of the Petrucci era internal strife resumed, with the popular faction ousting the Noveschi party supported by Pope Clement VII: the latter sent an army, but was defeated at Camollia in 1526. Emperor Charles V took advantage of the chaotic situation to put a Spanish garrison in Siena. From 1529 until 1541 the republic was governed by Alfonso Piccolomini. The citizens expelled him in 1552, allying with France: this was unacceptable for Charles, who sent his general Gian Giacomo Medici to lay siege to it with a Florentine-Imperial army.

The Sienese government entrusted its defence to Piero Strozzi. When the latter was defeated at the Battle of Marciano in August 1554, any hope of relief was lost. After 18 months of resistance, Siena surrendered to Spain on 21 April 1555, marking the end of the Republic. The new Spanish King Philip II, owing huge sums to the House of Medici, ceded Siena's entire territory to the Duchy of Florence (apart from a series of coastal fortress annexed to the State of the Presidi), with which it was merged in 1569 to form the Grand Duchy of Tuscany. An exiled Sienese republican government of 700 Sienese families in Montalcino did not concede defeat in the Battle of Marciano and continued to resist Tuscan rule until 1559, when Tuscan troops arrived and annexed Montalcino, too.

== Territory ==
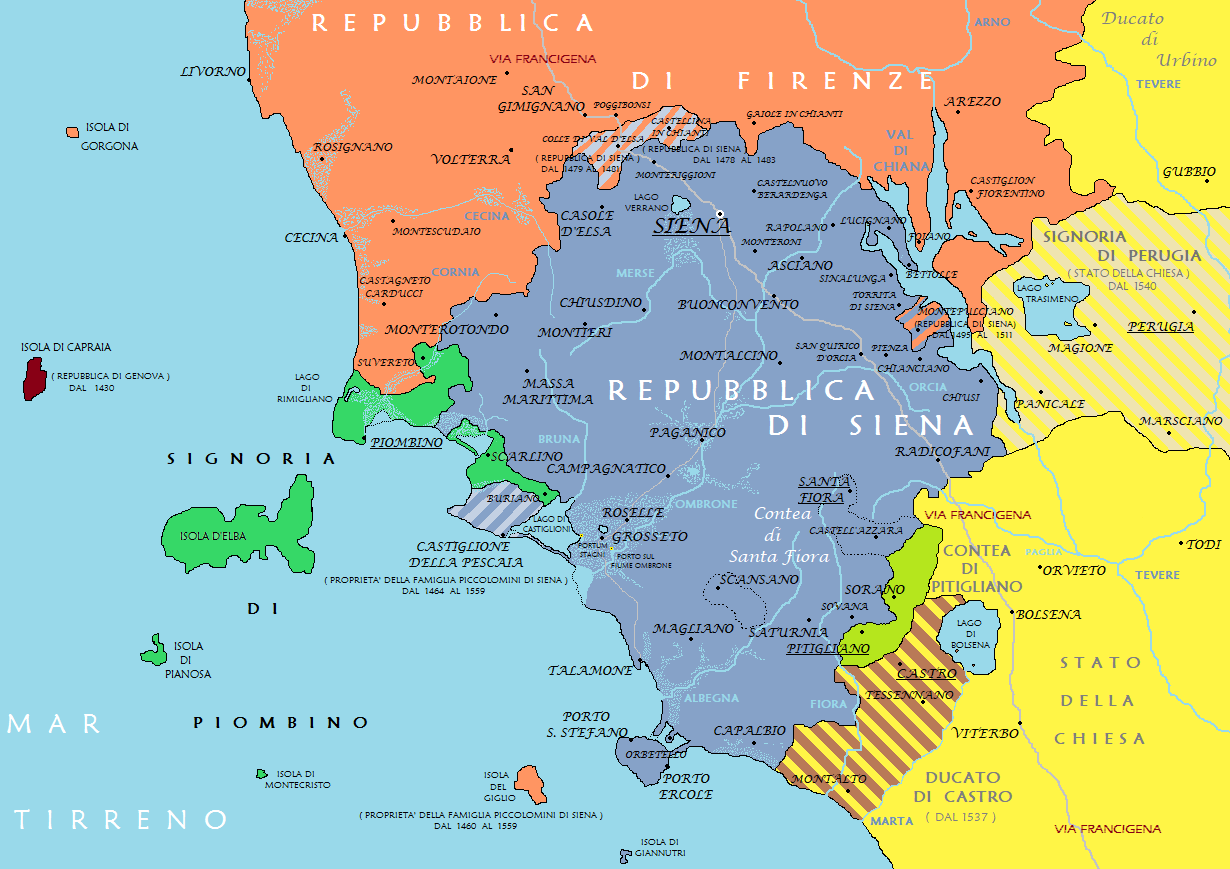
Map of the Republic of Siena (bluish-gray, "Repubblica di Siena")

Siena possessed most of the modern day provinces of Grosseto and Siena in the region of Tuscany in central Italy, including a coastline on the Tyrrhenian Sea. There are some exceptions, which were claimed by the neighbouring Florence, and were a constant source of hostility between the two city-states. In the mid-16th century the Republic's territory had an area of approximately 8,000 km^{2} (3,100 sq mi) and a population of 80,000, including some 15,000 living in the town of Siena.

== Culture ==
=== Art ===
Siena rivaled Florence in the arts throughout the 13th and 14th centuries: the important late medieval painter Duccio (1253–1319) was a Sienese, but worked across the peninsula. The mural titled "Allegory of Good Government" (Italian: Allegoria del Buon Governo) painted by Ambrogio Lorenzetti in 1338–39 at the Palazzo Pubblico, Siena's town hall, is considered a magnificent example of civil Gothic art in the world.

=== Architecture ===
During the early 13th century the majority of the construction of the Siena Cathedral (Duomo) was completed. During the same period the Piazza del Campo grew in importance as the centre of secular life. New streets were constructed leading to it, and it served as the site of the market and the location of various sporting events (perhaps better thought of as riots, in the fashion of the Florentine football matches that are still practised to this day). A wall was constructed in 1194 at the current site of the Palazzo Pubblico to stop soil erosion, an indication of how important the area was becoming as a civic space.

=== Walls ===
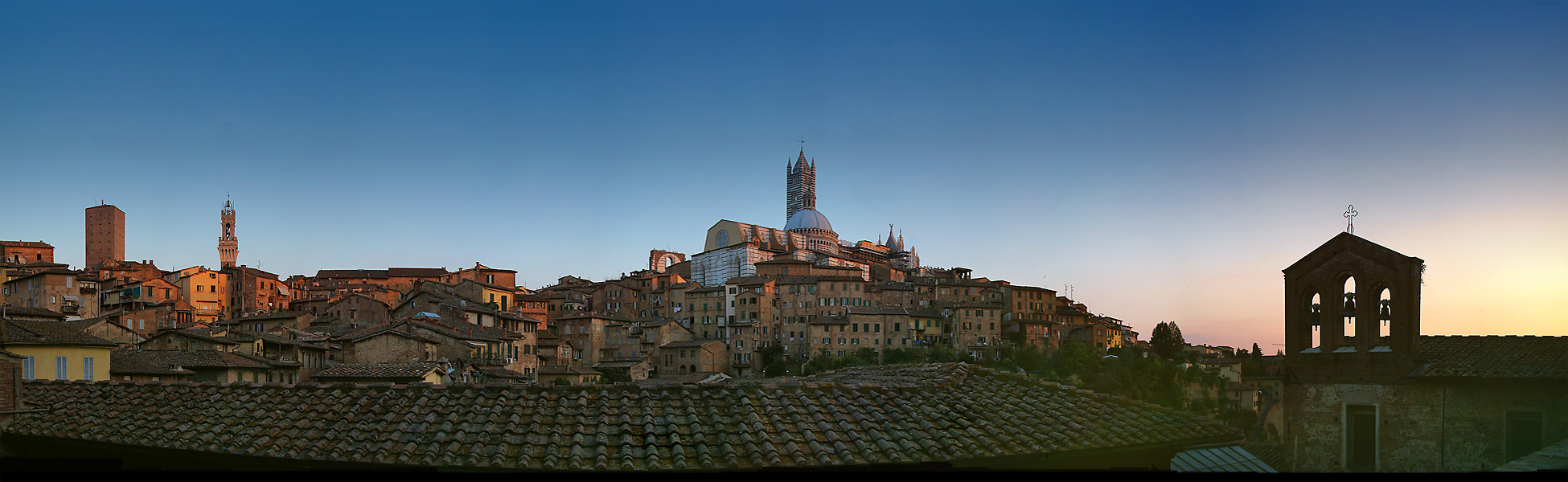
The historic centre dominated by the Duomo

The limits on the Roman town were the earliest known walls to the city. During the 10th and 11th centuries, the town grew to the east and later to the north, in what is now the Camollia district. Walls were built to totally surround the city, and a second set was finished by the end of the 13th century. Much of these walls still exist today.

=== Siena University ===
On December 26, 1240, Ildebrandino Cacciaconti, the then podestà of Siena, signed a decree imposing a tax on citizens of Siena who rented rooms to students of the local "Studium Senese". The money from this tax went to pay for the salaries of the maestri (teachers) of the new University of Siena. The studium was further supported when, in 1252, Pope Innocent IV declared both its teachers and students exempt from taxes and forced labour levied on their person or property by the city of Siena. Moreover, the commune exempted teachers of law and Latin from their public duties. By the early 14th century, there were five teachers of Latin, logic and law and two doctors of natural sciences (medicine). Nowadays, the university is still among the most important Italian universities.

=== Economy ===
In 1472 the Republic founded the Monte dei Paschi, a bank that is still active today and is the oldest surviving bank in the world.

The Republic was an important commercial center: wheat and salt were produced, coming from the Maremma region. It also controlled, thanks to a monopoly agreement stipulated with the Aldobrandeschi family, wool and other agricultural products, such as wine.

The main economic resource of the city came from the money exchange and loan activity that the bankers carried out in the city.

The oldest documentation regarding Siena's salt customs date back to the 13th century. The revenues from the salt monopoly were a significant source of income for the state. The various centers of the Sienese countryside and their citizens were required to stock up on salt from the Sienese Maremma area, purchasing the good at a fixed price. The growth of trade linked to Grosseto salt pans, capable of satisfying the needs of nearby Perugia and neighboring nations, led to the establishment in 1323 of a new organization, called "Monte e Sale", which simultaneously performed the administration of the monopoly and banking duties. From the end of the 14th century part of the proceeds deriving from the salt monopoly were destined to the payment of rents on the capital lent by state creditors, in order to face the growing public debt of the Republic. Subsequently, a union of the "Dogane dei paschi" and the salt was also attempted to improve the state financial capacities; however, as early as 1519 the various administrations returned divided.

The vast plots of grazing land in the Valdichiana and the Maremma Senese attracted shepherds from both territories under the direct control of Siena and from neighboring states. For an efficient exploitation of grazing activity, the Sienese government decided to create a special office, called "Dogana dei paschi", which was responsible for managing the tariff system connected to livestock breeding. The internal structure of the Dogana dei Paschi was made up of a treasurer and nine officers among whom a "unimpeachable chief" was elected. The latter was stationed in Maremma, from where he directed a group of vergari submitted to him for the observance of the laws of the Republic and control of the territory.

==== Mining sector ====
From the 12th century the interest of Siena towards mining research increased as silver and copper mines in the Sienese Maremma that were abandoned in the Roman period were re-established. Besides the mines of Montieri, Siena obtained other silver mines in the surroundings of Montebeccari in 1177 from Count Tedini of Frosini, and in the following century those of Roccastrada and Muceto from the Aldobrandeschi family. The Republic of Siena, however, did not directly manage the extractive activities on its own, but preferred to contract out the mines so as not to have the expenses fall on the state budget. Sienese interests in Maremma grew progressively over time: in 1334 the "government of the Nine" sent one of its officials to the territories of Grosseto and Massa to study possible interventions for the improvement of the road network and the following year with the conquest of the Republic of Massa, Siena was able to take possession of its rich mining district. The plague of 1348, however, caused a violent collapse of the mining activities of the Sienese Maremma which could no longer return to its previous production levels.

== Chronology ==
Borders of the Republic of Siena from 1125 to 1559

Government	Years active	Description
Consular	1125–1199	When ruled by a bishop, the elected consuls would represent the nobles, as well as the people. As episcopal power declined, theirs grew until 1167, when episcopal rule was expelled. The consuls continued to rule until a new government was deemed necessary.
Podestà	1199–1234	A Podestà was an executive elected by the people as an absolute ruler.
Ventiquattro (24)	1234–1270	Siena replaced its Podestà government with that of a council of elected officials. The number of officials fluctuated throughout the years, as shown by this chart.
Trentasei (36)	1270–1280	Siena replaced its Podestà government with that of a council of elected officials. The number of officials fluctuated throughout the years, as shown by this chart.
Quindici (15)	1280–1286	Siena replaced its Podestà government with that of a council of elected officials. The number of officials fluctuated throughout the years, as shown by this chart.
Nove (9)	1286–1355	Siena replaced its Podestà government with that of a council of elected officials. The number of officials fluctuated throughout the years, as shown by this chart.
Dodici (12)	1355–1385	Siena replaced its Podestà government with that of a council of elected officials. The number of officials fluctuated throughout the years, as shown by this chart.
Quindici (15)	1385	Siena replaced its Podestà government with that of a council of elected officials. The number of officials fluctuated throughout the years, as shown by this chart.
Priori	1385–1399	The council of the Priori (priors) was established in an attempt to stabilize the government and compete with Florence. It failed, however, with the number of priors constantly fluctuating and Florence continuing its aggression.
Visconti lordship	1399–1404	The priors of Siena gave the city's command to the House of Visconti to protect it from Florence.
Priori	1404–1487	With the House of Visconti expelled, the people set up another Priori government, this time with 10 priors. Unlike the former Priori government, this one was stable.
Petrucci lordship	1487–1525	The House of Petrucci gathered a great deal of influence and became quasi-rulers of the city-state until 1500, when Pandolfo Petrucci seized control of the city completely. Petrucci rule was a stable and prosperous time for Siena.
Priori	1525–1548	A Priori government was installed in an attempt to bring stability back to Siena, which it never did.
Spanish Lordship	1548–1552	Taking advantage of the chaotic political situation, Spain sent a garrison to take control of the city
Capitano del Popolo	1552–1555	To protect the city, the people empowered a single ruler, the Capitano del Popolo, or Captain of the People.
Republic of Siena at Montalcino	1555–1559	Following the conquest of Siena, the noble families held out at Montalcino.

== See also ==
- Grand Duchy of Tuscany
- Timeline of Siena

== Sources ==
- Mario Ascheri and Bradley Franco (2019). A History of Siena: From Its Origins to the Modern Day. Routledge. ISBN 978-0367253486
- Hook, Judith (1973). "The Fall of Siena". History Today. 23 (2).
