= Pannocchieschi =

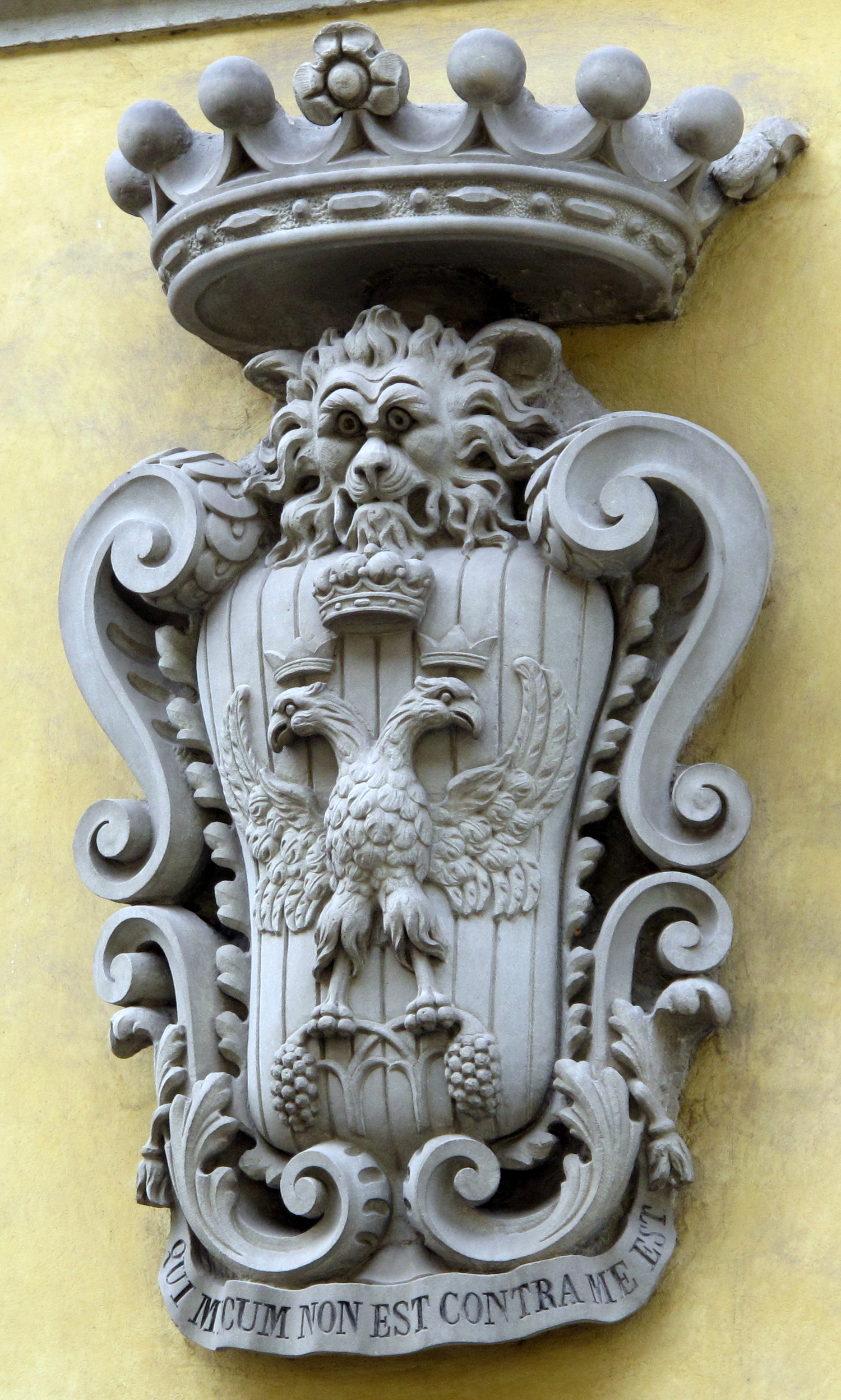
Coat of arms of the Pannocchieschi family

The Pannocchieschi was a prominent noble family from Siena and Volterra in Italy, probably of Lombard origin. They held the title Count of Elci.

They lived in the Palazzo Pannocchieschi d'Elci in Sienna which was built around the 16th century by the noble family of the Alessi. It was later passed to the Counts Pannocchieschi d'Elci.

== Notable members ==
- Scipione Pannocchieschi d’Elci
- Francesco Pannocchieschi
