= Contrada of the Wave =

District of Siena

Contrada Capitana dell'Onda
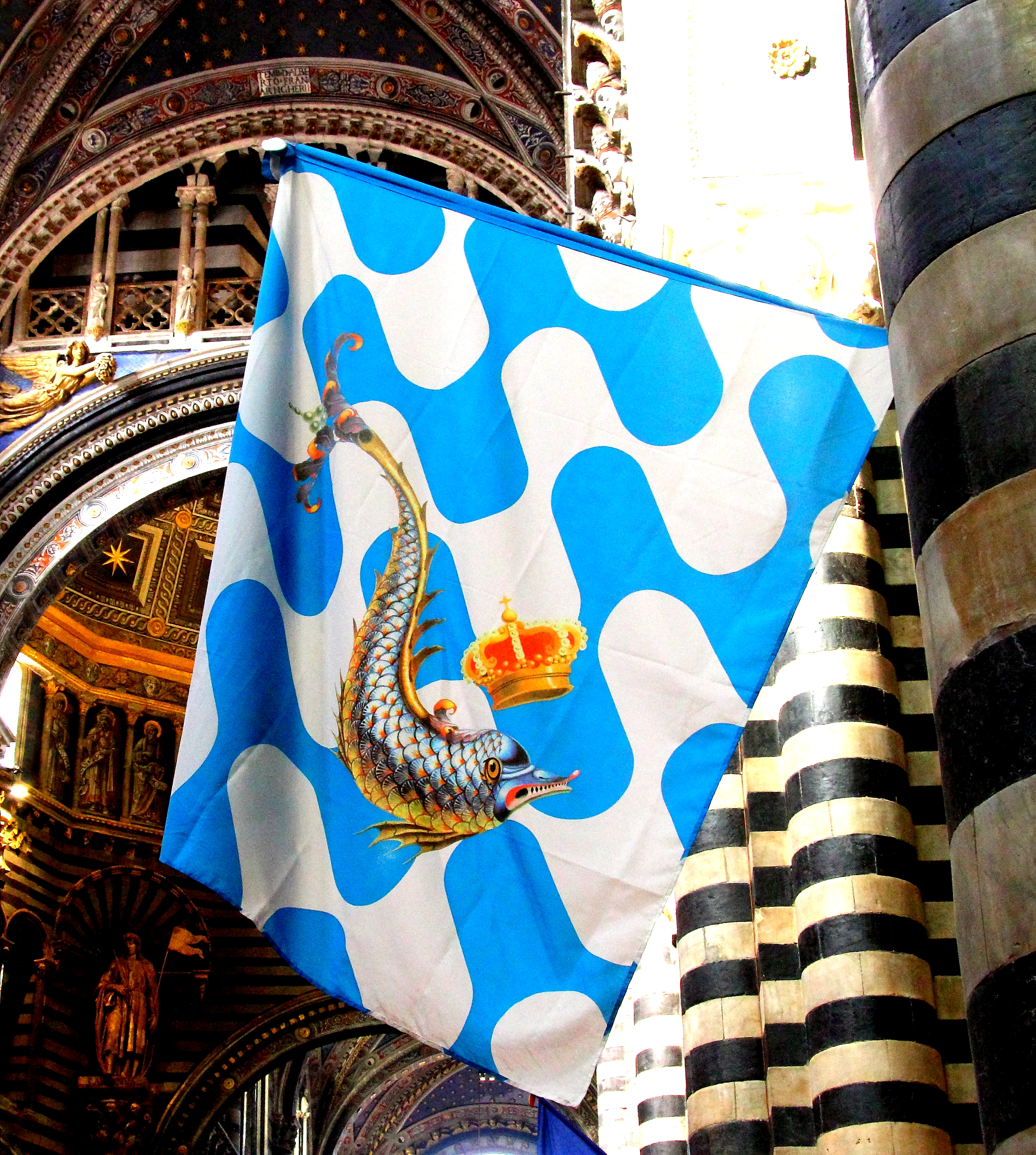
- Flag of the Onda

- Colours
- Coat of arms: A dolphin crowned with a royal crown, swimming in a blue sea, on a silver field
- Colours: White and sky blue
- Motto: Il colore del cielo, la forza del mare ("The colour of the sky, the strength of the sea")
- Patron: Visitation of the Virgin Mary (feast on the last Sunday of June)
- Military companies: Casato di Sotto, San Salvadore
- Terzo: Terzo di Città
- Headquarters and museum: Via Giovanni Duprè 111, Siena
- Oratory: San Giuseppe

Palio di Siena
- Wins: 41½ (official); 47½ (claimed by the contrada); Last: 4 July 2024
- Allies: Nicchio; Tartuca; Valdimontone
- Rival: Torre (not reciprocated)
- Nickname: Malborghetto
- Members: Ondaioli

The Contrada of the Wave (Italian: Contrada Capitana dell'Onda), usually called the Onda, is one of the seventeen contrade, the historic districts of the Tuscan city of Siena. It belongs to the Terzo di Città, one of the city's three traditional divisions, and is also known as Malborghetto, from the former name of its main street, Via Giovanni Duprè. Its emblem is a crowned dolphin swimming in the sea, and its colours are white and sky blue.

The Onda grew out of two of Siena's old military companies, San Salvadore and Casato di Sotto, and is first recorded at the city's public games in the late 15th century. Its title of Capitana ("captain") is traditionally explained by the duty of these companies to guard the Palazzo Pubblico, and the contrada also commemorates their defence of the port of Talamone, with which it is twinned. Its first book of deliberations, begun in 1524, is the oldest minute book kept by any contrada.

In the Palio di Siena the Onda has 41½ victories recognised by the municipality, the half being the race of 16 August 1713, which it shared with the Tartuca. The contrada itself counts 47½. Its most recent win came on 4 July 2024. It is allied with the Nicchio, the Tartuca and the Valdimontone, and regards the neighbouring Torre as its rival, a rivalry that the Torre does not reciprocate.

== Territory ==
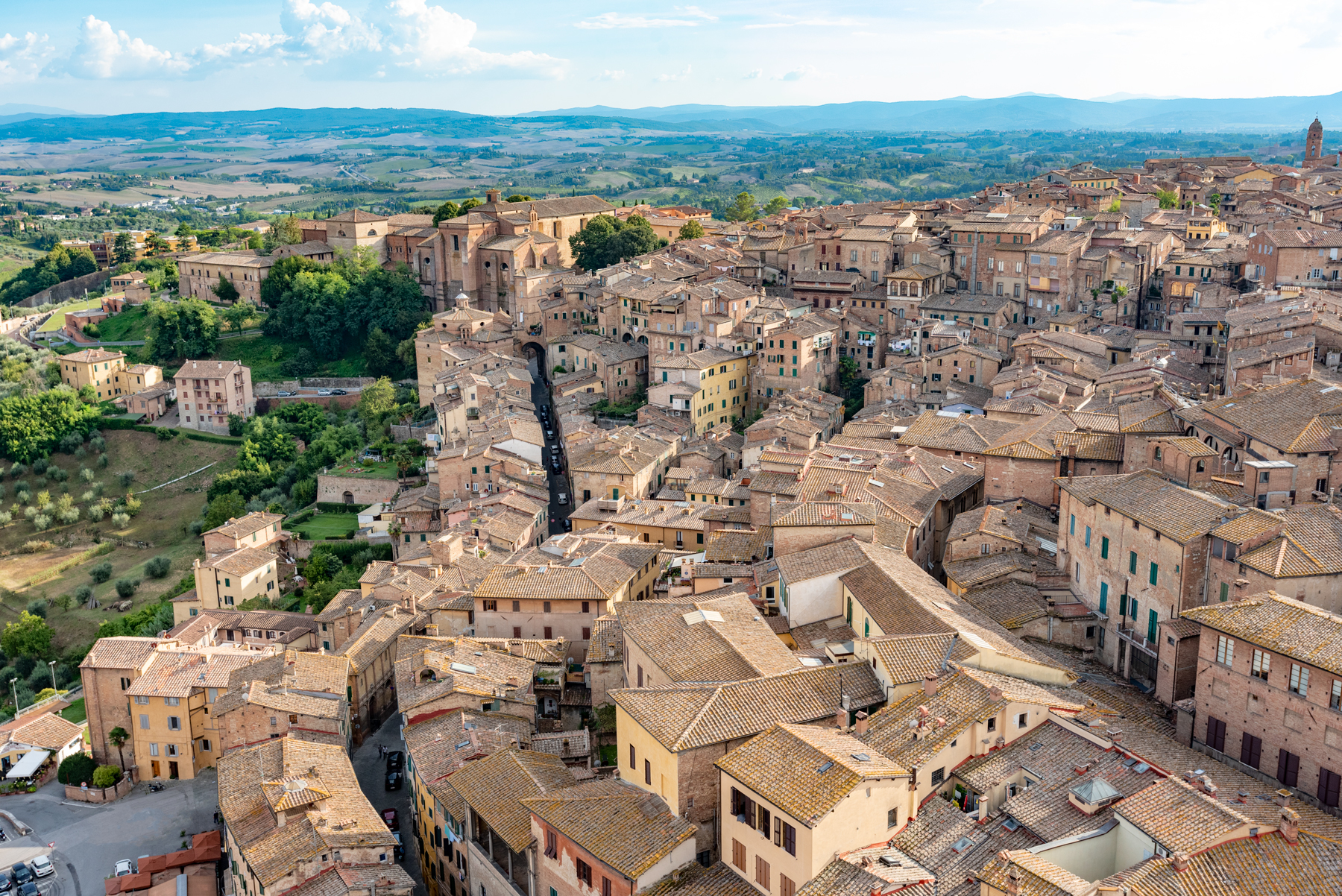
The territory of the Onda seen from the Torre del Mangia

The Onda belongs to the Terzo di Città, one of the three traditional divisions of Siena. Its boundaries, like those of the other contrade, derive from the edict (bando) issued by Violante of Bavaria, governor of Siena, on 7 January 1730. The edict assigned to the Onda the street of San Salvadore from the arch of San Giuseppe, half of the old market square, the part of the Palazzo Pubblico as far as the residence of the Capitano di Giustizia, houses along the Casato, and the street of Fontanella as far as Porta Tufi.

The main street, Via Giovanni Duprè, was called Via di Malborghetto until 1871, when it was renamed after the sculptor Giovanni Dupré, who was born there. The old name still serves as a nickname for the contrada and recalls the quarter's former reputation as one of the poorest and most disreputable in Siena.

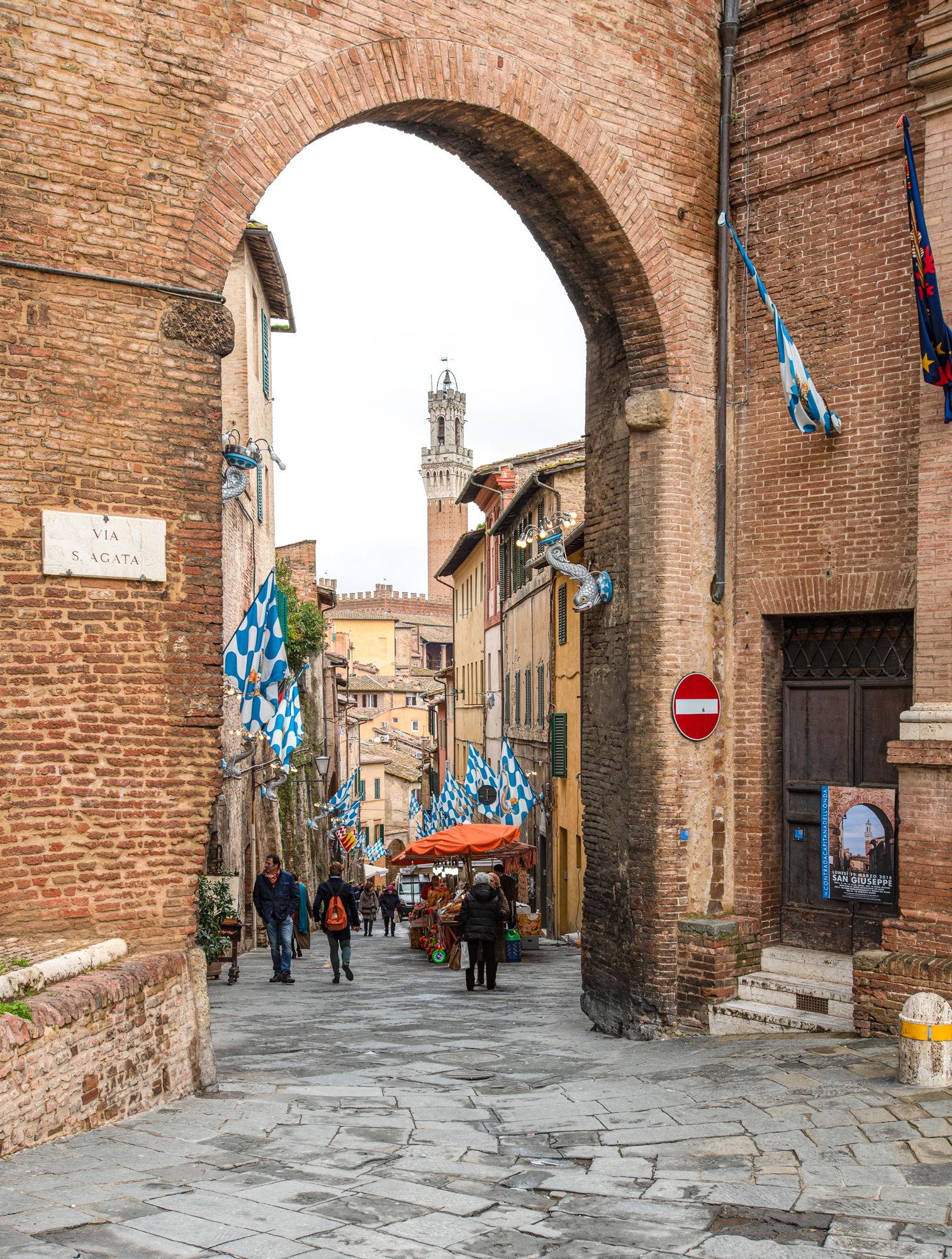
The arch of San Giuseppe and Via Giovanni Duprè

The arch of San Giuseppe, next to the church of the same name, is what remains of the Porta di San Salvadore, a gate in the 13th-century walls. The Onda borders four contrade: the Tartuca to the south-west, the Aquila to the north-west, the Torre to the north-east, with which it shares the Piazza del Mercato, and the Valdimontone to the south-east.

For historical reasons the contrada also regards Talamone, the former port of the Republic of Siena on the coast of the Maremma, as part of its territory. Its statute links this to the defence of the port by the companies of San Salvadore and Casato di Sotto, and residents of Talamone who are protettori (subscribing supporters) of the contrada belong to its people. The Onda has been twinned with Talamone since 1962.

== Places of the contrada ==
The church of San Giuseppe, the Onda's oratory since 1787, with the baptismal fountain in front of it

The contrada's oratory is the church of San Giuseppe, built between 1522 and 1653 by the carpenters' guild (Arte dei Legnaioli), many of whose members had workshops in the quarter. After the guild was suppressed, the church was granted to the Onda in 1787 by a rescript of Grand Duke Peter Leopold, and the ondaioli held their first meeting there on 17 June of that year.

Before 1787 the contrada met in the Chiesino ("little church") on Via Duprè, a small oratory created in 1589 by enclosing the portico of the church of San Salvadore and dedicated to the Visitation. The contrada had its seat on the upper floor for about two centuries. After a major restoration, completed in 2025, the contrada again uses it for religious services and as a workshop and store.

The baptismal fountain in front of the oratory, at the start of Via di Fontanella, was made in 1972 to a design by Algero Rosi, with coats of arms by Vittorio Conti and bronzes by Alfonso Buoninsegni. The contrada's annual baptism, a secular rite of membership, takes place there during the titular feast of the Visitation of the Virgin Mary, held on the last Sunday of June.

The museum occupies two connected spaces. The crypt of San Giuseppe contains the hall of victories, with the drappelloni (painted silk banners) won in the Palio, and plaster models by Giovanni Dupré and his daughter Amalia. The newer section, known as mOND, opened in 2016 in the former Policarpo Bandini nursery school next door.

The contrada's society, named after Giovanni Dupré, is in Vicolo di San Salvadore. It grew out of the Stella, a mutual aid society founded on 20 November 1873 for the education and relief of the poor, and was constituted as the Società di Mutuo Soccorso Giovanni Duprè on 6 November 1890. In 1937, under Fascism, it was renamed the Dopolavoro Giovanni Duprè, and it took back its present name after the liberation of Siena in 1944.

== Heraldry and title ==
The colours of the Onda are white and sky blue, and its motto is Il colore del cielo, la forza del mare ("The colour of the sky, the strength of the sea"). The arms of the Onda show a dolphin crowned with a royal crown, swimming in a blue sea, on a silver field. The crown was granted by King Umberto I in 1889. The dolphin had been adopted as the emblem of the contrada's assembly on 15 September 1560, and a white banner with a dolphin is recorded in 1694, but the original arms were those of the Company of San Salvadore, with wavy white and black stripes. In 1713, after its peace with the Torre, the Onda replaced the black of its banner with dark blue, while the old black and white arms remained in use until 1739, when they were adapted to the colours of the banner. The dolphin probably entered the coat of arms only in the first half of the 19th century: the drappellone of 2 July 1834, the first to show the animal emblems of the competing contrade, depicts a dolphin for the Onda.

The Onda's honorific title, Capitana, is traditionally explained by the duty of the companies of San Salvadore and Casato di Sotto to guard the Palazzo Pubblico, part of which lies within the contrada's territory. The historian Duccio Balestracci has suggested a different origin: texts of the 17th and 18th centuries describe the Onda as the "captain" of four small contrade, the Farfalla, the Pulcino, the Scorpione and the Stringa, whose members could take part in festivals only together with Malborghetto before they were absorbed into it.

== History ==
=== Origins and name ===
The Onda emerged in the 15th century from the union of the people of two military companies, those of the Casato di Sotto and of San Salvadore, whose duties included guarding the Tyrrhenian coast of the Republic of Siena and its main port, Talamone. When the two companies began to appear together at public festivals, they presented floats (macchine) with marine themes, featuring nymphs, Nereids, sirens, tritons and above all Neptune. This tradition, together with a sailors' society recorded in the quarter in the 13th century, has led to the view that the name Onda ("wave") comes from this link with the sea. The 18th-century historian Giovanni Antonio Pecci instead traced the name to the winding streets of the quarter, which he thought had also inspired the wavy arms of the Company of San Salvadore. Members of the contrada are known as ondaioli.

=== Early festivals and victories ===
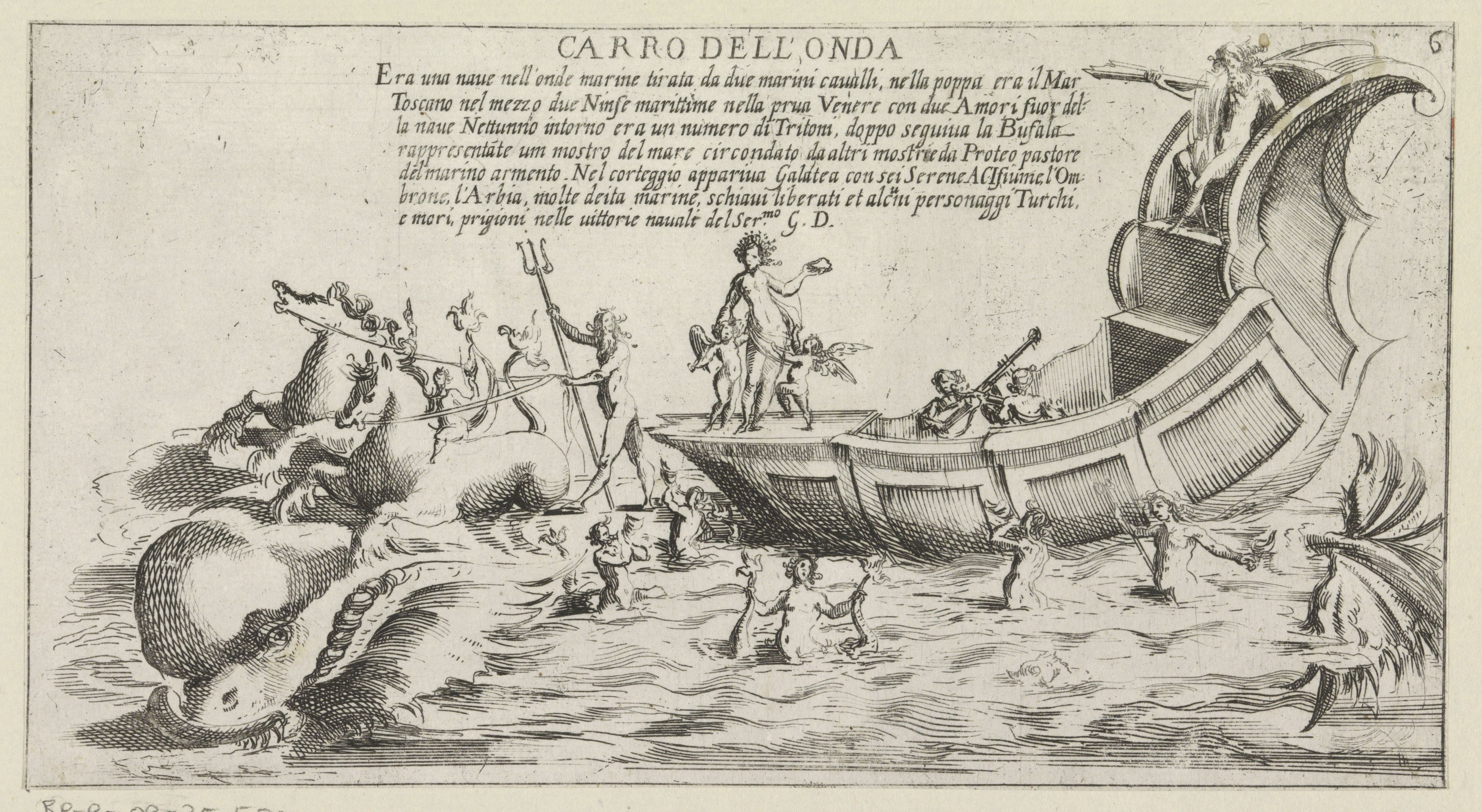
Triumphal car of the Onda for a festival in Siena in 1632, etching by Bernardino Capitelli

The Onda is named among the contrade that took part in a giuoco delle pugna, a mass fist fight in the Piazza del Campo, in 1494. It appeared at several bull hunts (cacce dei tori) between 1506 and 1585, building a large wooden ship on wheels for the hunt of 15 August 1525. At the hunt of 15 August 1546 its pageant of shepherds and nymphs escorted a car carrying Diana and Cupid.

The contrada's first book of deliberations, whose earliest record dates from 1524, is the oldest surviving minute book of any contrada. It shows an organisation derived from the military companies, headed by a captain and a standard-bearer (gonfaloniere). In 1612 the Onda became the first contrada to adopt written statutes, which regulated its internal organisation, its relations with the religious bodies in its territory and the management of its prizes and property. In 1634 the ondaioli elected a woman, Frasia, as their prior.

On 15 August 1581 the Onda won a palio alla lunga, a race run through the streets rather than in the Piazza, offered by the Aquila. The race is remembered because the Drago's horse was ridden by a peasant girl, Virginia Tacci. The contrada counts this race as the first of its victories. In 1599 it won the oldest known bufalata, a race with buffaloes, organised by the Torre, and it won four more between 1609 and 1639. In 1612 it won the first known asinata, a donkey race held for Grand Duke Cosimo II de' Medici, after a hard struggle with the Oca. The contrada also claims two Palii won in 1641 and 1643, which are not officially recognised.

=== In the Palio ===
The Onda claims victories in the Palii of 2 July 1666 and 1669, attested by a deliberation of 1669 in its archive ordering the sale of their prizes, but these are not recognised by the municipality. Its first official victory came on 2 July 1671, followed by those of 7 June 1676 and 2 July 1692.

The Onda won again on 2 July 1703 and 2 July 1709. On 16 August 1713, in a race organised by the Chiocciola, the Onda's horse reached the finish first but stopped halfway along the judges' stand, while the Tartuca's horse went past the whole stand. After the Tartuca protested, on 10 September the authorities divided the prize money between the two contrade, and the drappellone was given to the church of San Giuseppe. Both contrade still count the race as half a victory, and from the following year the rules required the winner to pass the whole of the judges' stand. After a further win in August 1714, the Onda went more than 42 years without a victory until 3 July 1757. In 1779 it won both the July and the August Palio, its only cappotto (double in one year), and the jockey Dorino won three more races for it, in 1783, 1784 and 1790.

On 16 August 1802 the Onda won the first August Palio held on a permanent annual basis. It won eight times between 1848 and 1870, including two extraordinary Palii, one run on 27 April 1860 for the visit of King Victor Emmanuel II and one on 28 September 1862 for the congress of Italian scientists held in Siena. The following 22 years without a win made the Onda, in 1887, the contrada that had gone longest without a victory, a position known as the nonna ("grandmother"), which it passed on when it won on 3 July 1892. On 29 May 1893 it won an extraordinary Palio held for the inauguration of a monument to the students of Siena and Pisa who fell at Curtatone and Montanara.

After a win on 2 July 1902, the Onda went 26 years without a victory, until an extraordinary Palio on 14 September 1928 won by Sgonfio on Giacca. After the Palio of July 1930, which it also won, the Onda joined the Tartuca, the Nicchio and the Oca in an alliance known as TONO, from the initials of its members. Until its break-up in 1934 the alliance won seven of the nine Palii run, the Onda's share being the race of 3 July 1932, won by Ganascia. This was the first Palio broadcast live on radio, with commentary by Luigi Bonelli for EIAR.

The Onda won on 2 July 1950 with Giuseppe Gentili, known as Ciancone. On 2 July 1954 Vittorino won for it on Gaudenzia in the first Palio broadcast live on television, which was relayed through Eurovision to several European countries. Further victories followed in 1969 (Ciancone), 1972 (Valente), 1980 (Marasma), and 1985 and 1995 (both with Cianchino).

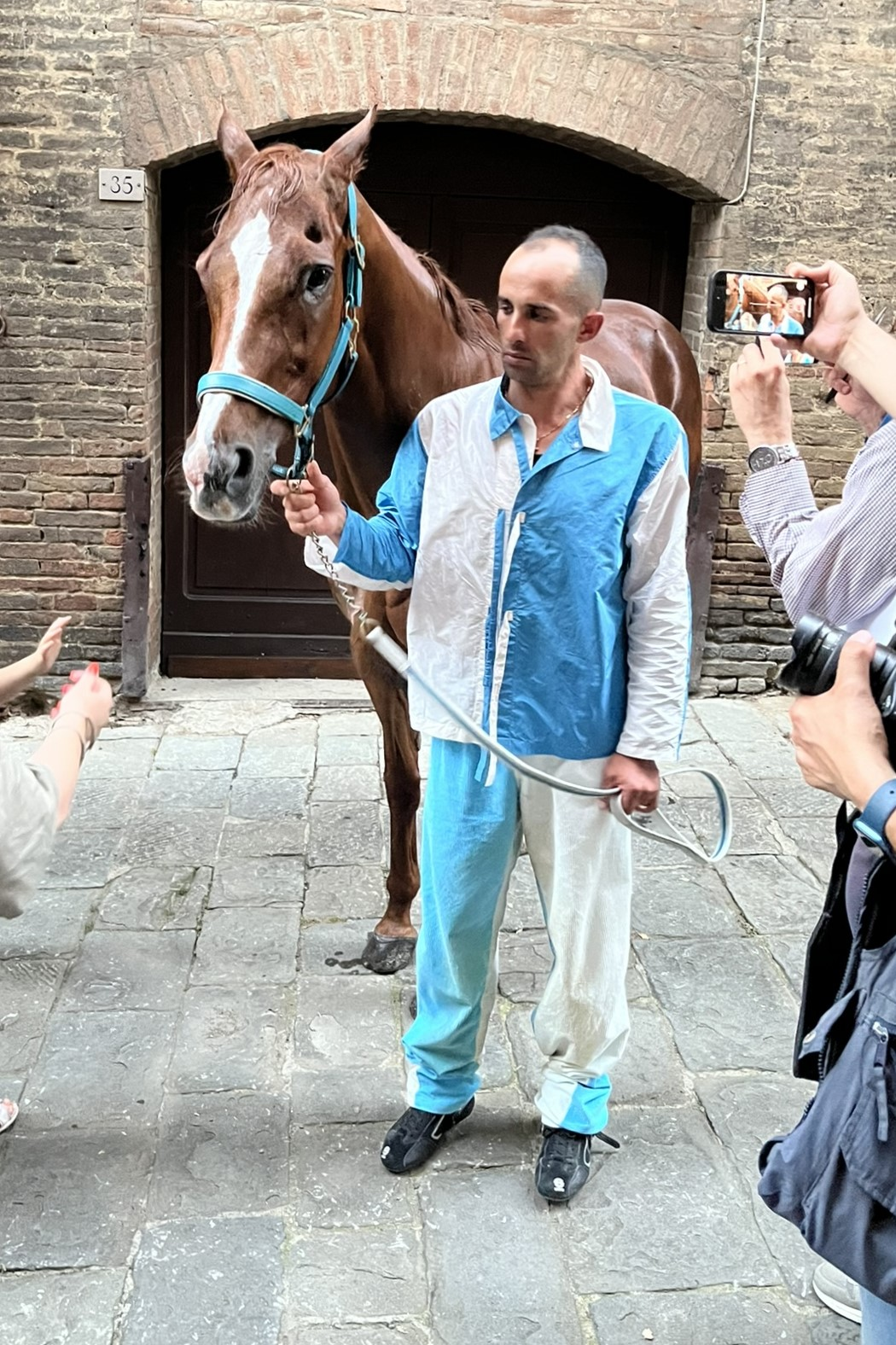
Tabacco and Brigante, winners of the Palio of 4 July 2024

After 17 years without a win, the Onda won on 2 July 2012 with Luigi Bruschelli (Trecciolino) on Ivanov. On 16 August 2013 Giovanni Atzeni (Tittia) won for it on Morosita Prima, coming from behind. Carlo Sanna (Brigante) won the August Palio of 2017, dedicated to the bicentenary of Giovanni Dupré's birth, on Porto Alabe, and won again for the Onda on 4 July 2024 on Tabacco, in a race postponed for two days by heavy rain.

== Relations with other contrade ==
The Onda is allied with the Nicchio, an alliance dating from the 17th century, with the Valdimontone since 1781 and with the Tartuca since 1933. Two of these allies, the Nicchio and the Valdimontone, are rivals of each other. The Onda was also allied with the Oca from the first half of the 17th century until 1966, apart from a break between 1925 and 1930. The alliance ended after the Oca's groom (barbaresco) attacked the jockey Ciancone, whom the Onda had engaged for the August Palio of 1966, and the two contrade came to blows.

The Onda regards the Torre as its rival, but the Torre does not reciprocate, making this the only one-sided rivalry among the contrade. The enmity between the two neighbours is probably the oldest documented rivalry in Siena. It probably began over boundaries, and in the 17th century the old market square that they share was the scene of frequent, sometimes bloody, clashes. After the Palio of 2 July 1688, in which a Torre standard-bearer had seized the reins of the Onda's horse, an ondaiolo killed him with a halberd, and landlords and employers in each contrada evicted tenants and dismissed employees from the other.

In July 1713 an ondaiolo named Pierucci stabbed a torraiolo, Orazio Mannotti, and armed members of the Torre entered the Onda's streets looking for him. The authorities imposed a peace, sealed by a notarial deed on 10 August 1713, and the Onda returned a drum it had taken from the Torre. Relations then remained largely peaceful for about two centuries. In the early 20th century the two contrade exchanged visits during their annual feasts, the Onda painted the Torre's arms beside those of its allies in its new hall of victories in 1911, and in 1928 the Torre lent the Onda iron arches for its victory celebrations.

The rivalry revived at the Palio of July 1930, when both contrade had drawn strong horses. Angered by the Torre's assumption that it would help its neighbour to win, the Onda obtained the jockey Picino from the Oca in exchange for its own, Sgonfio. The Torre felt betrayed, the two contrade came to blows during the trial races, and after the Onda won, the break between them became permanent. Since then the Torre has concentrated on its rivalry with the Oca and does not treat the Onda as an adversary, while the rivalry remains strongly felt in the Onda.

== Victories ==
The municipality of Siena credits the Onda with 42 Palio wins, one of them the race of 16 August 1713 shared with the Tartuca, for an official total of 41½. The contrada counts 47½ victories, adding six races that are not on the official roll: the palio alla lunga of 15 August 1581, the Palii of 14 July 1641 and 9 May 1643, and those of 2 July 1666, 1669 and 1679.

Officially recognised victories:

- 2 July 1671
- 7 June 1676
- 2 July 1692
- 2 July 1703
- 2 July 1709
- 16 August 1713 (half, shared with the Tartuca)
- 16 August 1714
- 3 July 1757
- 2 July 1779
- 16 August 1779
- 18 August 1783
- 2 July 1784
- 2 July 1790
- 16 August 1802
- 2 July 1810
- 2 July 1819
- 16 August 1825
- 15 August 1848
- 16 August 1849
- 17 August 1851
- 15 August 1856
- 27 April 1860
- 28 September 1862
- 2 July 1868
- 15 August 1870
- 3 July 1892
- 29 May 1893
- 2 July 1902
- 14 September 1928
- 3 July 1930
- 3 July 1932
- 2 July 1950
- 2 July 1954
- 2 July 1969
- 16 August 1972
- 2 July 1980
- 16 August 1985
- 2 July 1995
- 2 July 2012
- 16 August 2013
- 16 August 2017
- 4 July 2024

== Sources ==
- Ascheri, Mario; Cornice, Alberto; Ricceri, Emilio; Santini, Armando, eds. (2004). Memorie della Compagnia di San Salvatore. Contrada dell'Onda (Siena 1524–1764) (in Italian). Siena: Industria Grafica Pistolesi.
- Balestracci, Duccio (2019). Il Palio di Siena. Una festa italiana (in Italian). Rome and Bari: Laterza. ISBN 88-581-3621-7.
- Barbarulli, Giordano Bruno, ed. (2014). 16 agosto 1713. Il Palio a mezzo (in Italian). Monteriggioni: Tipografia Torchio.
- Filiani, Roberto; Zaffaroni, Natale (2003). Con la rivale in campo (1960–1989) (in Italian). Siena: Il Leccio. ISBN 978-88-86507-87-5.
- Fiorini, Alberto (2009). Bestiario senese. Simbologia e storia degli animali totemici delle contrade del Palio di Siena (in Italian). Siena: Il Leccio. ISBN 978-88-89184-25-7.
- Fiorini, Alberto (2017). Strade di Siena (in Italian). Pisa: Pacini. ISBN 88-6995-211-8.
- Gardner, Edmund G. (1913). The Story of Siena and San Gimignano. London: J. M. Dent.
- Gonnelli, Lorenzo (2023). Sguardi sul Palio 1954–2022. Una narrazione su scala globale (in Italian). Siena: Betti. ISBN 88-7576-805-6.
- Heywood, William (1904). Palio and Ponte: An Account of the Sports of Central Italy from the Age of Dante to the XXth Century. London: Methuen.
- Losi, Simonetta, ed. (1999). I quaderni dell'Onda 3. Libro secondo di deliberazioni (1604–1673) (in Italian). Siena: Betti.
- Luchini, Luca (1985). Palio XX secolo. Una città fra realtà e leggenda (in Italian). Siena: Tipografia Senese.
- Verdone, Mario, ed. (2017). Siena. La città del Palio (in Italian). Siena: Betti. ISBN 88-7576-529-4.
- Zazzeroni, Antonio (1980). Le carriere nel Campo e le feste senesi dal 1650 al 1914 (in Italian). Siena: Periccioli.
