= Contrada of the Tortoise =

District of Siena

Contrada della Tartuca
- Flag Coat of Arms

- Colors
- Coat of arms: A Greek tortoise with Savoy knots alternating with daisies
- Colors: Yellow and blue
- Motto: Forza e costanza albergo
- Patron saint: Anthony of Padua (June 13)
- Military units: Porta all'Arco, Sant'Agata
- Headquarters: Via Tommaso Pendola, 21 – 53100 Siena
- Museum: Museum of the Contrada of the Tortoise; Via Tommaso Pendola, 21
- Oratory: Oratory of St. Anthony of Padua

Palio of Siena
- Wins: 48.5 (for the municipality); 54.5 (for the Contrada); Last: October 20, 2018
- Allies: Leocorno; Nicchio; Onda; Selva
- Rivals: Chiocciola
- Nickname: Tartuchini
- Leadership: Prior: Antonio Carapelli (since 2020); Captain: Niccolo Rugani (since 2022)
- Magazine: Murella Cronache

The Contrada of the Tortoise (Italian: Contrada della Tartuca) is one of the seventeen historic subdivisions of the Tuscan city of Siena. It takes part in the Palio di Siena.

== Territory ==
=== The streets at the time of the Notice ===
The Notice of Violante of Bavaria (1730) determines the territorial division of the seventeen Contrade of Siena by reference to the palaces and their owners of the time, thus relying on buildings rather than roads. It is still considered the basic arrangement for determining the actual boundaries of the Contrade. According to the Notice concerning the New Division of Contrade Boundaries, the territory of the Contrada of the Tortoise is bounded by the following streets and palaces:

"Tartuca. n. 3 – From the hospice of Santa Lucia exclusively comprise the street of Ellera on both sides, convent, church and square of Sant'Agostino, convent and houses of the Fathers of the Rose and the whole street as far as Porta Tufi. From the arch of Sant'Agostino take only to the left hand and occupy on both sides the via de Maestri, as the via delle Murella up to the arch of the nuns of Castelvecchio, include the via di Castelvecchino and Castelvecchio and going down the coast facing the church of San Pietro end at the crusade of the said three streets called the Porta all'Arco, sticking in said crusade only to the right hand.". (Note: The edict known as the Notice of Violante of Bavaria was officially announced on January 7, 1730, following the approval by the Government Council of the report entitled "New Division of the Boundaries between the Contrade," delivered to the Balìa on September 13, 1729. Full text: "I confini delle Contrade". ilpalio.siena.it. Archived from the original on August 20, 2010.)

The scholar Girolamo Gigli thus reported in his Diario Sanese, published posthumously in 1723:

"The Tartuca which is the oldest Contrada in Siena contains Castel Vecchio, the Murella, the Via dei Maestri, the Via delle Cerchia, the Via di San Pietro and that of the Porta all'Arco, that is, the Portone di Sant'Agostino."

— Girolamo Gigli, Diario Sanese

=== The streets in the present day ===
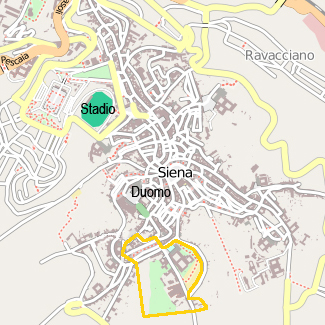
Geographical location of the Tartuca territory within the Municipality of Siena

The hospice of Santa Lucia no longer exists in the present day. The Ellera street corresponds to what is now Via delle Cerchia; the term Ellera identifies ivy, a plant that grew along the early medieval walls of the street. The present church of St. Augustine (mid-13th century) has been restored and enlarged several times over the centuries; the convent named after the saint houses the "Enea Silvio Piccolomini" classical lyceum and the Tolomei Boarding School.

At the houses of the Fathers of the Rose the Siena Academy of Sciences and the Museum of the History of Science have been located since 1816. The convent, which was originally the home of the Catholic monastic congregation of the Camaldolese Friars of the Rose, has been converted into a university campus. The Porta Tufi (1325–1326) is one of the entrances to the historic center of Siena: it is attributed to the Sienese architect and sculptor Agnolo di Ventura.

The arch of Sant'Agostino was the city gate until 1325; from 1730 (the year of the "Notice" (Note: The year in which the "Notice" came into effect is sometimes given as 1729. The confusion is due to the fact that at that time the Sienese calendar "ab Incarnatione Domini" was adopted in Siena, according to which the civil year began on March 25. The "Notice" was promulgated by the ''Balìa'' on January 7, 1730, and published seven days later: considering the Sienese calendar, however, these two dates fell in the year 1729, as indicated in the original document (cf. R. Martinelli, pp. 8–9).)) it became the gateway to the present-day Prato di Sant'Agostino, i.e., the tree-lined square bordering the church dedicated to the saint. Via dei Maestri coincides with today's Via Tito Sarrocchi. Via delle Murella, whose toponymy refers to the modest size of the medieval walls of the circle, is now called Via Tommaso Pendola.

The arch of the nuns of Castelvecchio was the arch of the convent of Santa Margherita in Castelvecchio. Via di Castelvecchio has kept its name intact, as has the church of San Pietro; via di Castelvecchino is now the alley of Castelvecchio. Porta all'Arco was originally included in the circle of walls: it was located between today's Via Tommaso Pendola and Via del Casato di Sopra; however, it no longer existed at the time of the publication of the "Notice" in 1730.

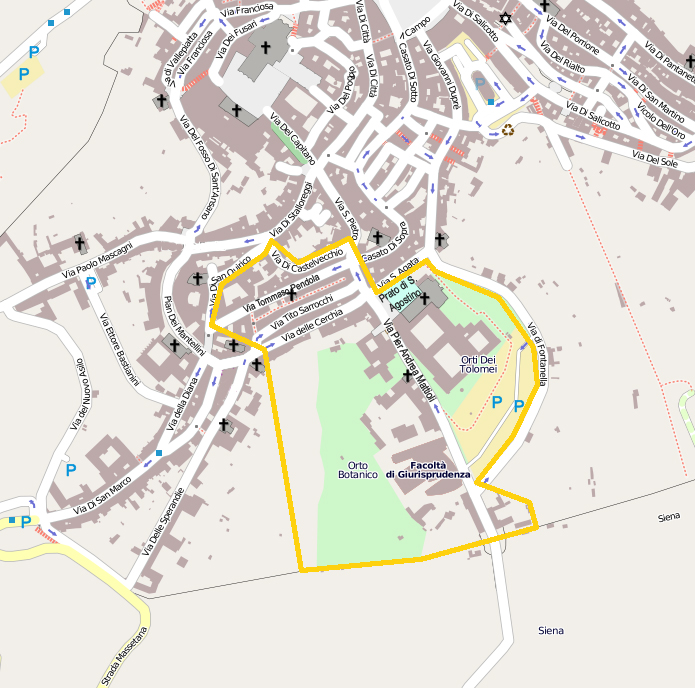
Detailed map of the Tortoise territory

The territory of the Contrada of the Tortoise, located entirely within the Terzo di Città, is bounded by the following streets and squares:

- Streets:
  - delle Cerchia
  - di Castelvecchio
  - Pier Andrea Mattioli (Note: Via Pier Andrea Mattioli, on both sides as far as Porta Tufi, is part of Tartuca territory. The territory extending out of Porta Tufi is considered to be under the influence of the Contrada.)
  - Tito Sarrocchi
  - Tommaso Pendola
  - San Pietro (part of) (Note: Only the right side of Via San Pietro, from No. 60 to No. 86, is part of the territory. The rest of the street is divided between Aquila and Pantera.)
  - Sant'Agata (part of) (Note: Only the section of the street from the Prato di Sant'Agostino to the intersection with Via di Fontanella is included in Tartuca territory. The rest of the street is in Onda territory.)
- Alleys:
  - di Castelvecchio
  - del Saltarello
  - della Tartuca
- Squares:
  - Prato di Sant'Agostino (Note: The Prato di Sant'Agostino (St. Augustine's Lawn) is in front of the former St. Augustine's Convent with its adjoining vegetable gardens, later named "Orti del Tolomei.")
  - Silvio Gigli (Note: Piazzetta Silvio Gigli was named after the journalist and Tortoise member from Siena in 2004.)

The Tartuca is bordered by:

- Aquila: to the north, along Via San Pietro;
- Chiocciola: to the west, along Via delle Cerchia, Via Sarrocchi and Via Pendola;
- Onda: to the east, along Via San Pietro, Via Sant'Agata and the beginning of Via di Fontanella;
- Pantera: to the northwest, along Via di Castelvecchio.

=== Places of the Contrada ===
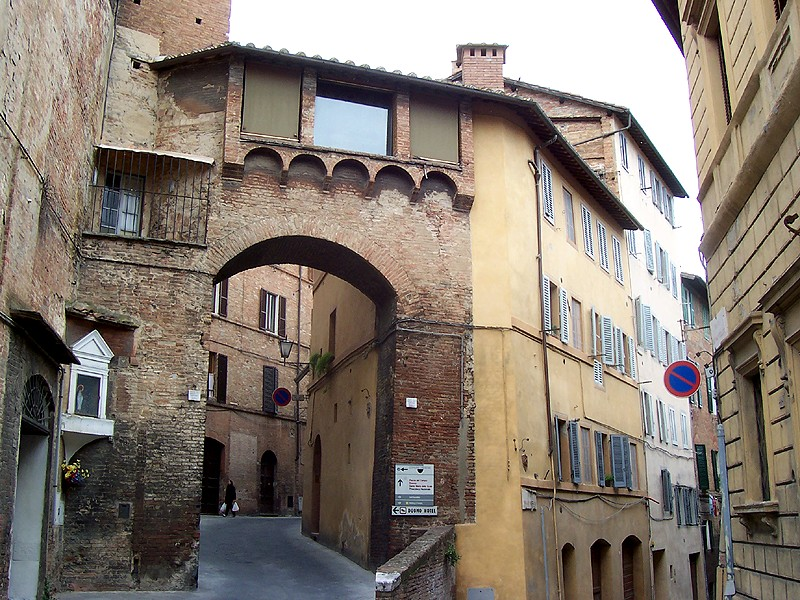
The arch of Via Sarrocchi, which is the boundary (Note: The photo is taken from Via delle Sperandie, located in Chiocciola territory. The street beyond the arch is via Sarrocchi, Tartuca territory.) between Tartuca and Chiocciola

- Headquarters

The Contrada headquarters is located at St. Anthony of Padua Church on Tommaso Pendola Street, formerly Murella Street; it has been in the same place since 1684.

- Oratory (Note: The church in Contrada is called the Oratory. The officiating of the Oratory is entrusted to a priest, who has the title "Corrector"(cfr.:"L'Oratorio". Sito ufficiale del Palio di Siena. Archived from the original on April 29, 2015.). One example is the Scolopian Tommaso Pendola, who was a "Corrector" during the 19th century.)

The Contrada church coincides with the headquarters; it is in fact the Oratory of St. Anthony of Padua, called by the Contrada members the Oratory of St. Anthony of Padua alle Murella, dedicated to the Contrada's patron saint, Anthony of Padua. The history of the oratory dates back to the second half of the 17th century, when the Tortoise Contrada members bought an old house owned by the friars of the Order of St. Augustine. It was on the foundations of that house that the new church was built, in the Baroque style. The design and construction work was taken care of almost exclusively by the Tortoise Contrada members: the designer was Niccolò Franchini, later Prior (Note: The Prior of a Siena Contrada is the one who manages the administrative life of the Contrada throughout the year, decides together with the councilors on both administrative and leisure initiatives, and represents the Contrada at events.) of the Tortoise; his son Jacomo was the architect; Giovan Antonio Mazzuoli was the sculptor who made the high altar; the various construction, masonry, and stucco work was taken care of by the Contrada members themselves. The first feast dedicated to the patron saint of the Contrada was celebrated in the church as early as 1682. The "Titular Feast" (Note: Every year, on the occasion of the feast of the patron saint, each Contrada of Siena celebrates its "Titular Feast" at the oratory and in the ward. The "Titular Feast" is celebrated in a solemn manner according to a precise calendar of events. On the eve of the event, there is a "Solemn Matins," a religious service celebrated by the Contrada priest (the "Correttore") at the end of which the faithful kiss the relic of the Patron Saint. In the ward, illuminated and festively decorated, the popular feast then begins. On the day of the Feast, the "Giro" is organized: a hundred costumed standard bearers and drummers march through the streets of the city, paying homage with a flag-waving to their members and the allied Contrade. A "baptism of the Contrada members" is also organized during the Feast Day. For more on the Titular Feast: "La Festa Titolare". Sito ufficiale del Palio di Siena. Archived from the original on April 29, 2015.) of the Contrada of the Tortoise is celebrated annually on June 13, the day on which St. Anthony is remembered.

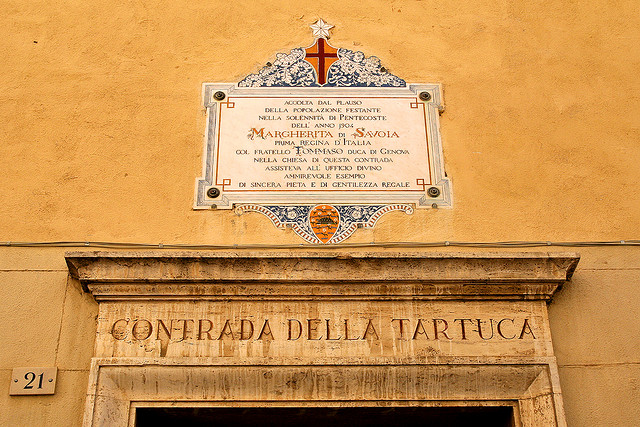
The headquarters of the Tartuca, at 21 Via Pendola.

- Museum

The Contrada Museum Complex is located attached to the Oratory on Tommaso Pendola Street. The museum is divided into three sections: the "Museum of Sacred Furniture," which preserves sacred furnishings belonging to the church; the "Costume Museum" and the "Palio Museum." In the section devoted to victories, the drapes won by the Contrada are preserved; in the section devoted to costume, the monture (i.e., historical costumes of Risorgimento inspiration) worn by the participants in the historical procession are preserved. Also preserved here are the masgalani, including one in chiseled and embossed silver dated 1676, depicting the Rape of Europa.

- Baptismal Fountain

The fountain is dated 1951 and is the work of sculptor Bruno Buracchini. At the fountain takes place the "baptism of the contrada members," similar to all the other Contrade of Siena: a secular baptism, which aims to "sacralize" perpetual membership in one's Contrada. (Note: The "baptism of the Contrada members" was first adopted by the Contrada of the Chiocciola in 1949; the rite consists of sprinkling the future Contrada member with water flowing from the fountain existing in the Contrada's own territory (cfr.: "Il popolo". Sito ufficiale del Palio di Siena. Archived from the original on April 29, 2015.).) The originator of the "baptism" was a famous Tortoise Contrada member: journalist and radio host Silvio Gigli.

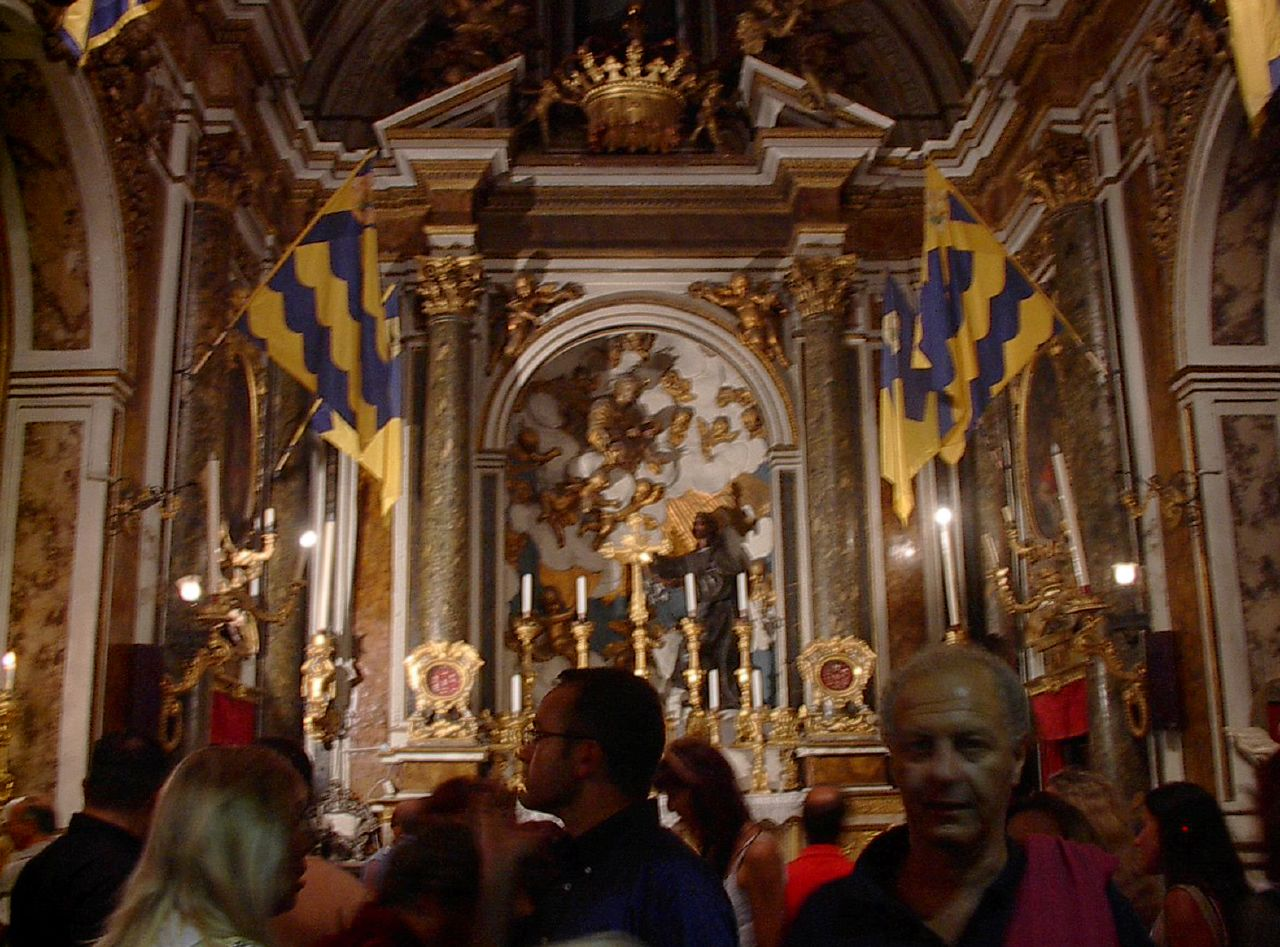
The interior of Sant'Antonio alle Murella, after the victory of August 16, 2002

- Contrada Society (Note: Established during the second half of the 19th century, the Contrada Societies are associations that came into being with the aim of strengthening the bonds between Contrada members by promoting recreational, cultural and sporting activities. They now represent a meeting point and gathering place especially for those Contrada members who, in the vast majority, no longer live in the district (cfr.:"La società". Sito ufficiale del Palio di Siena. Archived from the original on April 29, 2015.).)

Officially named "Castelsenio Mutual Aid Society," it has its headquarters on Via Mattioli. Officially formed in 1887, it links its name to the legend of Senio, founder of Siena. Established with the intention of supporting the poorest and financing Palio-related expenses, the Society was originally located at 25 Via Castelvecchio. Over the following years, the headquarters moved first to 13 Via dei Maestri and then to 30; the current location is in Piazzetta Silvio Gigli, along Via Mattioli The "Castelsenio Mutual Aid Society" is the only one among the Contrada Societies to keep the reference to Mutual Aid in its name.

- Stable

The stable where the horse is cared for on the days of the Palio di Siena is located at the alley of the Tortoise, at number 9.

== Origins ==
Military companies

This is how the two military Companies from whose union the Contrada of the Tortoise originated were defined in 1723 by Giovanni Antonio Pecci:

- Porta all'Arco: "The Contrada of the streets of the Murella, and of the Maestri, said to be of the Porta all'Arco with red Insignia, with a transverse white cross."
- Sant'Agata

"The Contrada of St. Agatha takes its name from the ancient Parish Church of St. Agatha, which from the Church of St. Nicholas, called St. Lucy's, extends along the road of the Cerchia, down to the Porta all'Arco, and ends at the Porta Tufi, which uses for its Insignia red field with a white transverse cross, and above St. Agatha."

Although there is no absolute certainty about the exact historical origins of the Contrade of Siena, it is nonetheless known that the Contrada of the Tortoise was born within the so-called "contrata di Castelvecchio," the oldest part of the city of Siena, of probable Etruscan origins.

It is established that as early as the fifteenth and sixteenth centuries the inhabitants of the Castelvecchio area used to gather to participate in the Piazza del Campo Campo in "bull hunts" and "bufalate", forerunner spectacles of the Palio di Siena run with horses. The Contrada's insignia was yellow and black, and bore the image of a tortoise.

Apparently, the Tartuca originated in 1516, from the union of the military Companies of "Porta all'Arco" and "Sant'Agata." These Companies were wards of the Civic Guard, organized on a territorial basis, and one was created in each district of Siena. They were a form of Contrada military corps, and all male Contrada members from eighteen to seventy years of age were members. The first historical source within the Contrada of the Tortoise (Note: The first historical document published by the Contrada of the Tortoise is dated 1818, and is entitled: Memoria istorico – cronologia della Tartuca published on the occasion of the solemn consecration of the Church of said Contrada. It provides some historical information on the origins of the Contrada. Cfr.: Giovanni Gigli. "Breve storiografia tartuchina". Contrada della Tartuca. Archived from the original (Pdf) on September 24, 2015.) cites 1516 as the year of origin:

In 1516 the two ancient Contrade of Porta all'Arco, and of S. Agata [...] represented a Tortoise in a Chariot of Triumph, escorted by a numerous host of Youths dressed in the Roman style and unfurled the black and yellow Vessel as the symbol of the Roman Empire with a great Tortoise in the middle on a blue field.

— Historical-chronological memoir of the Tartuca published on the occasion of the solemn consecration of the Church of said Contrada

There is no documentary evidence to confirm the authenticity of the account, however, it appears confirmed that the Contrada of the Tortoise was definitely born before the fall of the Republic of Siena (1555). The name of the Tortoise first appears in an official document in 1560, in which it is requested that:

Marianotto, maker of this Work, ordered that the animal known as the Tortoise should be immediately assigned to the men of said Contrada.

By contrast, the Contrada does not appear to be mentioned in the original of a letter from a certain "Cecchino Cartaio" dated August 15, 1546, addressed to Madonna Gentile Tantucci, in which a "bull hunt" disputed in the Piazza del Campo is minutely described; the reference to the Tartuca appeared in a reprint of the letter in 1582.

The first real gatherings of the Tortoise Contrada members during the seventeenth century took place at the Contrada church, which was then the Chiesa delle Carceri di Sant'Ansano, dedicated to Ansano di Siena Protector of the Contrada. The Tartuca tried unsuccessfully to buy the church, which was owned by the "Opera del Duomo" of Siena; for this reason a house was then bought on Via delle Murella, on which the present oratory dedicated to Anthony of Padua, the new Protector of the Contrada, was built. (Note: The house on which the new church stood was the one in which Caterina Vannini (1562–1606), a Sienese courtesan who later converted and became a nun and mystic, had lived; after her death she was proclaimed a Servant of God. For further study: Misciattelli, Piero (1932). Caterina Vannini, una cortigiana convertita senese e il cardinale Federigo Borromeo alla luce di un epistolario inedito. Milano: Treves-Treccani-Tumminelli.)

== Relations with the Contrade ==
Beginning in the Late Middle Ages, the Contrade of Siena began to rival each other in bull hunts, buffalo tournaments, and even the actual Palio run with horses.

For centuries, in the context of the Palio, the Contrade have had friendly relations with each other, involving: exchanges of visits and special honors, the display of friendly flags on solemnities, mutual aid in special circumstances. (Note: On the occasion of the Palio, the alliance relationship with a Contrada makes easier a possibility of an understanding, of a more or less secret agreement. In 1958 Dario Neri and Giovanni Cecchini wrote thus, "Tradition has it that among the allied Contrade the one that has been blessed with a mediocre horse helps on favorable terms the one that has had a very good one. And if the horses are both Palio horses, the Contrada that has not won for the longest time is to be helped." (Cecchini, Giovanni; Dario Neri (1958). Il Palio di Siena. Milano: Electa. pp. 279–280.). However, it should be remembered that today alliance relationships have lost some of their practical value while remaining formally relevant (cfr.: Capperucci, Mino; Odoardo Piscini (2008). Il palio raccontato: bibliografia ragionata e ragionevole sul Palio di Siena. Ibiskos Editrice Risolo. p. 22.).) Allied Contrade are called "aggregates." Similarly, almost every Contrada has an adversary, with whom it has no relationship: indeed, on the occasion of the Palio, antagonism and rivalries are enhanced even more.

=== Alliances ===
There are currently four Contrade "aggregated" with the Tartuca: Selva since 1789; Leocorno since 1815; Nicchio and Onda since 1933.

However, the Tortoise, over the centuries, has had other "aggregated" Contrade. The Goose was so between 1933 and 1975; going back even further in time, the Tower between 1689 and 1930. With the Snail, the current only rival, there was even an alliance bond on several occasions: from 1689 to 1814, from 1820 to 1840, and finally from 1847 to 1906.

One of the closest and most effective bonds of aggregation in the history of the Palio of Siena was the so-called the "T.O.N.O.," from the initials of the names of the four Contrade that composed it: the Tartuca, Onda, Nicchio and Oca. It was this new alliance pact, along with the Tartuca victory in the 1930 Palio dell'Assunta, that caused the dissolution of the centuries-old alliance with the Torre.

The "T.O.N.O." took its first steps in 1928, but had its final consecration after the July Palio of 1930, with the violent breakup between Onda and Torre. Already in 1928 the three drapes were won by Oca, Nicchio and Onda, then from 1930 to 1934 the "T.O.N.O." left the other Contrade with only crumbs. In fact, it was only in July 1931 and 1934 that the Aquila and Civetta won. For the rest, it was an unchallenged domination of the four "aggregates": in 1933 even came the "coat" of the Tartuca, destined to remain the only one of the twentieth century for a long time. The flattering results of this alliance left little room for doubt: the mechanisms were so well established that the leaderships of the four Contrade could manage the Palio-related arrangements as they pleased. However, the end of the alliance came on the evening of August 16, 1934, at the end of the Palio.

It happened that already from the "tratta" (Note: The "tratta" is the parade of horses that have been admitted by the City's veterinarians to participate in the selection for the ten that will run the Palio. All are tested, to check their adaptability and physical condition; those unsuitable are discarded.) the first problems emerged: the two favored race horses Folco and Ruello were excluded, and this increased the uncertainty in a way that did not allow the strategists of the "T.O.N.O." to outline a precise strategy. However, the four decided to bet on the Goose, which mounted jockey Meloncino, already a winner in July, on the horse Wally. Despite these agreements, someone in the Nicchio, led by jockey Pietrino, began to believe in the chances of success of the unknown horse Lampo. In any case, the Nicchio leadership preferred to follow a strategy that did not have victory as its goal, sticking to the agreements with the "T.O.N.O." Pietrino complied, having no intention of giving up the money promised to him by the Oca; but some of the Contrada members of the Nicchio, seeing him initially confident of Lampo, were convinced that the jockey wanted to ride to victory.

The carriera (Note: A carriera is defined as the horse race for the contest of the Palio.) saw Nicchio and Oca start in the lead: although the Nicchio horse seemed clearly superior, Pietrino very conspicuously held back Lampo and at the last turn of the Casato he let Meloncino and Wally pass, allowing them a comfortable victory. The Contrada members of the Nicchio, now certain of victory, reacted badly. Pietrino was attacked, shortly a furious brawl broke out with the Contrada members of the Oca, and before long the alliance between the two contrade was broken, turning into a real rivalry that also brought down the "T.O.N.O.".

Despite these events, the Tartuca maintained its alliances with Onda and Nicchio, officially stipulated in 1933. The "aggregation" relationship with the Oca did not break down either: however, the bond between the two Contrade was dissolved in 1975. It happened, in fact, that during the trials prior to the Palio of August 17 (precisely at the fourth trial) the Chiocciola and the Oca decided to exchange jockeys: Valente went to the Oca, Aceto to the Chiocciola. This was enough for the Tartuca to decide to break the alliance.

=== Rivalries ===
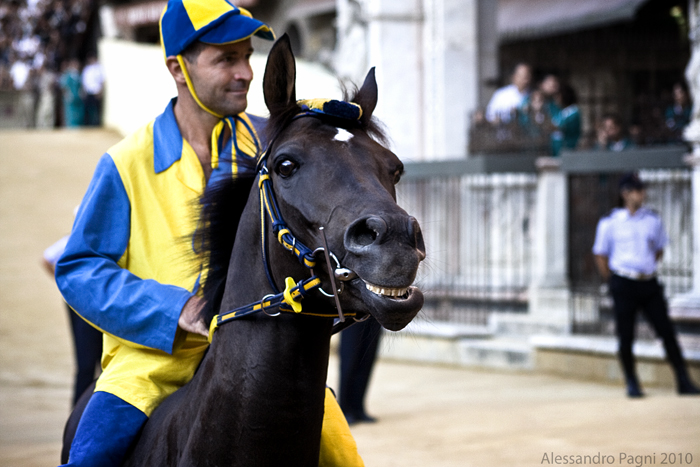
Luigi Bruschelli on Istriceddu: the two won August 16, 2010, Palio for the Tartuca

The Tartuca's only rival is the Chiocciola, the Contrada known as the "drowners of saints". (Note: The appellation "drowners of saints" associated with the Contrada of the Chiocciola and its Contrada members dates back to the late nineteenth century.) Their rivalry is one of the oldest and most deeply rooted in the history of the Palio of Siena; it has the distinction of having been interrupted and then resumed several times over the centuries. As with other existing rivalries between the Contrade, it also has its roots in discussions about territorial boundaries: some evidence of clashes between the two Contrade dating back even to the period before 1652 confirms this.

The most striking episode that took place during the 17th century is dated 1686, and is related to the July 28 Palio won by the Giraffe. During the phase of assigning the horses (the "tratta") serious incidents broke out between the Contrada members of Chiocciola and Tartuca so much so that initially the city authorities forbade the two Contrade to participate in the Palio, burdening them also with a fine of 100 lire. It was Cardinal Francesco Maria de' Medici who revoked the provision, for fear of further serious incidents, on the condition that the extras of the two Contrade entered Piazza del Campo unarmed, as was the custom at the time.

The adversarial relationship was officially resolved as early as three years later: in fact, in 1689 Tartuca, Chiocciola and Torre entered into an alliance agreement, to which one hundred years later Selva (allied with both Chiocciola and Tartuca) was added. On June 13, the two peoples celebrated together the Tartuca's patron saint Anthony of Padua. After the Palio of August 16, 1701, with Chiocciola first and Tartuca second, extras and captains of the two Contrade (plus representatives of the Torre) went to the church of the Oca, the organizer of that Palio, to pay homage by singing a solemn Te Deum.

During the 18th century the two Contrade kept faith with the alliance; everything changed in the next century, starting with the Palio of August 1814: on that day the Tartuca jockey Niccolò Chiarini known as Caino was nerfed and stopped for a lap by the Chiocciola jockey, Giovanni Simoncini known as Belloccio. This resulted in serious unrest among the Contrada members, with the Tartuca members going so far as to set fire to the coat of arms of the now former Chiocciola ally. The climax of the tensions occurred during the Palio of August 16, 1820, when the jockeys of the two Contrade (Francesco Morelli known as Ferrino Maggiore of the Tartuca and Adamo Bracali known as The Old Man of the Chiocciola) got off their horses and nerbed each other for the duration of the race, until they fell exhausted. The extremely tense situation and pressure from the city authorities forced the leaderships of the two Contrade to come to an alliance agreement, which was officially sanctioned in October 1820 with a banquet of eighteen Contrada members, nine from each Contrada.

The calm lasted for twenty years: the rivalry was made official again after the Palio of August 16, 1841. On that day the Tartuca jockey Giuseppe Brandani known as Ghiozzo pushed the Chiocciola's famous Gobbo Saragiolo off his horse. Those were years in which the Tartuca was strongly opposed by the population because of its colors, which were too similar to those of the House of Habsburg. In August 1856, the jockey of the Drago Donato Partini known as Partino Minore took 25 liras to stop the Tartuca, ridden by the favorite Francesco Bianchini known as Campanino; in July 1857 the same Partino, this time in the Lupa, violently nerbied the Tartuca jockey Gaetano Bastianelli known as Gano di Catera, under compensation of 45 liras. In those years, on the other hand, the Chiocciola scored as many as six victories in nine years (between 1850 and 1858).

Official relations between Tartuca and Chiocciola were seesaw between continuous reconciliations and conflicts. However, from the second half of the nineteenth century the Chiocciola entered a crisis: in fact, it remained dry from 1888 to 1911. In the very same period there was a real rise of the Tartuca, which triumphed on six occasions between 1889 and 1910. For these reasons, too, relations deteriorated severely, although the rivalry had been officially suspended in 1866. On August 6, 1891, a non-belligerency agreement was concluded, but it had little success.

1904 was a particularly complicated year for the two rivals. In July the Tartuca lost the Palio at the last moment: Picino was mocked in a sprint by rival Nappa of the Pantera. In August the same Picino resoundingly changed contrada, switching to the rival Chiocciola. His Palio was short-lived: he was heavily nerbed by Zaraballe, a jockey hired by the Tartuca for the sole purpose of preventing his rival's success. On August 16, 1906, after the Aquila's victory, the Chiocciola became "grandmother," (Note: The "grandmother" is the Contrada on which the "kerchief" rests, that is, the one that has not won the Palio for the longest time.) and the Tartuca taunts helped fuel the contrasts between the two Contrade. After the Tartuca's victory in August 1910 and the new incidents that followed, a rivalry that was now experienced by both factions became official once again.

In 1915 there was a last attempt at reconciliation, but it was unsuccessful. After suspension due to wartime events, the rivalry between Tartuca and Chiocciola resumed vitality. In August 1924 Picino initiated a golden period for the Chiocciola: victories for Cispa followed in August 1925 and 1926. The Tartuca's response was not long in coming, and throughout the 1930s it dominated the fortunes of the Palio thanks to its alliance with Oca, Nicchio and Onda: the aforementioned "T.O.N.O."

In August 1938, after the dissolution of the "T.O.N.O.," the rivalry between Chiocciola and Tartuca was enriched by a new chapter: the Tartuca was widely favored thanks to the jockey Ganascia on the horse Ruello, whereas the Chiocciola presented itself with Tripolino on the modest race horse Sansano. Against all odds the Chiocciola won after a twelve-year abstinence. A black crisis opened in the Tartuca: the idol Ganascia was harshly challenged by the Tartuca members, guilty of having done little to prevent the rival's victory. The seemingly inseparable relationship between the jockey and the contrada of Castelvecchio was thus interrupted. On July 2, 1949, the Tartuca was still among the favorites, with Ciancone on the strong horse Piero. The Chiocciola came to the starting block with Eletto Alessandri known as Bazza, on the "brenna" (Note: In the Palio of Siena glossary, the term "brenna" means a horse of little value.) Lirio. Surprisingly, as eleven years earlier, it was the Chiocciola that won, mocking the favored Tartuca.

To the alternating victories and dark periods between the two rivals, the Tartuca responded in 1951 with Ciancone, after a fast of eighteen years, then repeated in 1953 with Ranco. In 1957 fate was mocking for the Tartuca: during rehearsals Il Biondo, jockey of the Chiocciola, was injured, and in his place the management chose Vittorino, who had just been discarded by the Tartuca (Mezz'etto was chosen instead). It was Vittorino who won, with the Tartuca jockey falling off his horse.

In the second half of the twentieth century, jockeys also helped fuel the rivalry between Tartuca and Chiocciola. In the 1960s, in fact, a duel began between two nearly homonymous jockeys: Leonardo Viti known as Canapino and Antonio Trinetti known as Canapetta. The former made his debut in the Chiocciola, running twice in 1960 and then in 1964, before switching to the rival for whom he ran ten times; the latter was a jockey for the Tartuca on five occasions, then ran for the rival seven times, with two victories.

In 1972 it was Aceto on Mirabella who won for the Tartuca, in what would be the contrada's last victory until 1991. For the contrada of Castelvecchio another period of crisis began, corresponding to an exceptional one for the rival Chiocciola: victories in August 1975, July 1976, August 1982. In 1983 there was yet another clash in the Piazza between the rivals: in August, during the stages of the mossa,, (Note: The mossa is the place where the ten Contrade running the Palio agree to start.) Ercolino ran for the Tartuca exclusively to hinder Bazzino of the Chiocciola. The Tartuca jockey never let up on his rival, decisively conditioning him to the point of forcing him to block at the starting block, vainly protesting with his backbone up. While the Giraffe was winning the Palio with Moretto, Chiocciola and Tartuca members had already taken to the track to brawl. Because of his behavior, Adolfo Manzi known as Ercolino was disqualified for six Palios.

Another critical year in the history of the Tartuca and Chiocciola rivalry was 1991. For the July 2 Palio, the Tartuca, winless for nineteen years, was the eve's favorite thanks to the Cianchino-Uberto pairing. The Chiocciola, which at the last moment preferred Falchino to Bastiano, ran with the goal of preventing its rival's victory. At the mossa the situation was paradoxical, with the chasing Nicchio (Note: Of the ten Contrade that run the Palio, nine are lined up by the mossiere (whose duty is to regulate the departure) between the starting ropes, while the tenth, which remains outside, has the task of giving the start by galloping past the verrocchino (the tool that holds the starting rope taut).) standing firm never seeing its rival Montone in trouble at the starting block, and with the Chiocciola constantly obstructing the correct alignment of the Tartuca. For these reasons the Palio was postponed until the next day. Little changed: the Cianchino-Falchino duel immediately became bitter, with the Chiocciola jockey forcing his rival to a difficult start in the last positions. Cianchino began to recover positions, however, and managed to win by overtaking Il Bufera della Lupa at the last turn of San Martino.

In August 1997, the Tartuca replicated the historic hurdle put in place in 1983 by Ercolino. The protagonist was Bucefalo, who had the task of stopping rival Trecciolino. Despite the fall at the starting block, Bucefalo put in a continuous and determined disruptive action. The action succeeded, but the Tartuchino jockey was disqualified for twenty Palii because of his conduct. The Chiocciola would know how to take revenge in the last clash between the 20th century rivals, dated August 16, 1999, after seventeen years of fasting. It was Massimino who won, with Tartuca's Il Bufera falling at the third bend of San Martino.

== Heraldry ==
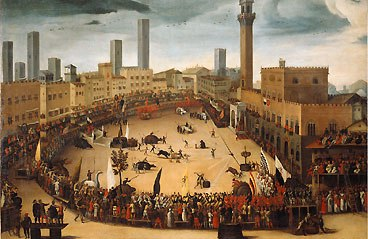
Vincenzo Rustici, Hunting of the bulls in the Piazza del Campo. Painting made based on the description of "Cecchino Cartaio."

The current coat of arms of the Tartuca is represented by a Greek tortoise (Note: There are many theories regarding the origin of the choice of the tortoise as the Contrada's symbolic animal; among the most credited is that of Pino Gilioli (Gilioli, Pino (2006). Un mondo di simboli: le Contrade e il Palio di Siena. Siena: Betti.). Gilioli claims that the tortoise derives from the ancient insignia of the Roman legions that occupied the Etruscan fortress, which was located in the territory of the Contrada. The symbol found on the soldiers' shields was the snake, a symbolic land animal often adopted by military armies, and comparable to the tortoise (the Tuscan term "bizzùca," derived from "snake," means precisely "tortoise." Cfr: "Etimologia della parola "Bizzuca"". etimo.it. Archived from the original on March 6, 2012.).) on grassy ground, sown with blue Savoy knots alternating with white daisies. Over the centuries, however, the coat of arms has undergone radical changes, culminating in the present design.

The colors of the Contrada were first historically attested in 1582, the year of the reprinting of the famous letter made in 1546 by a certain "Cecchino Cartaio," who minutely described a bull hunt held in Piazza del Campo. According to the author, all the extras entered the Piazza del Campo shouting the insignia of their Contrada and carrying a "grandissima macchina" (a kind of present-day allegorical wagon) that had the shape of the animal that distinguished them. Thus wrote "Cecchino Cartaio" referring to the Tortoise Contrada members:

Their banner was yellow and black and it was carried by Bernardine of Cornwall, dressed all in black velvet full of gold rosettes with a great deal of beautiful sight.

— Cecchino Cartaio, "The Magnificent and Honored Feast Celebrated in Siena for Our Lady of August in the Year 1546: Letter from Cecchino Cartaio to Madonna Gentile Tantucci.

A document from the City of Siena dated June 30, 1701, confirms that the colors of the Tartuca jockeys' jackets were indeed yellow and black. In the short period between 1714 and 1716 the Contrada replaced the black with red, although there is no general unanimity as to whether this color change actually occurred.

The image of the turtle appeared for the first time in the Contrada's coat of arms only in 1717, on the occasion of the Corteo storico preceding the Extraordinary Palio on July 2, called to celebrate the visit to Siena of Violante Beatrice of Bavaria. The Tartuca appeared at the Corteo with a triumphal float, and historian and scholar Giuseppe Maria Torrenti (c. 1680-c. 1726) reported the following annotation:

The Tartuca Contrada uses a Tortoise in the field with yellow and black stripes.

— Giuseppe Maria Torrenti

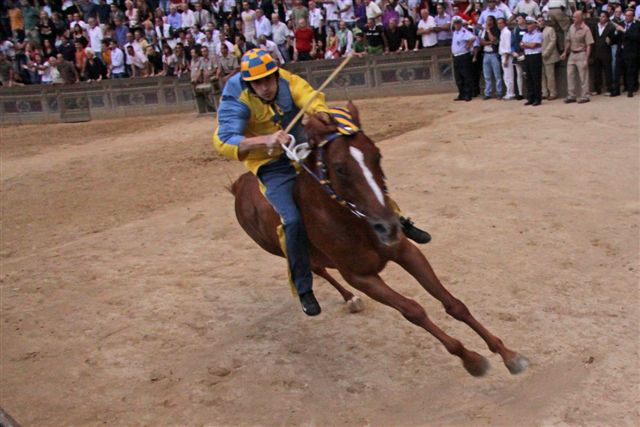
Gingillo wears the Tartuca jacket, with the current yellow and turquoise colors

Starting with the extraordinary Palio of April 2, 1739, called to celebrate the visit of the Grand duke of tuscany Francis I of Lorraine, the Tartuca presented the insignia with yellow and black in equal parts, with the turtle placed in the center on a blue field. In 1767 a small change to the colors was decided: on the occasion of the extraordinary Palio on May 14, the costumes of the monturati were almost exclusively yellow, with insignia in black. Another small change occurred three years later, when it was decided to add some turquoise ribbons to the jockey's vest, probably for mere aesthetic taste. In 1792 the flag underwent another minor change: the lists were abandoned and the "yellow and black checkerboard pattern and a little light blue" was introduced.

During the Risorgimento period the Tartuca was always at the center of bitter criticism from the Sienese citizens because its colors were too similar to those of the Habsburg rulers. The Tartuca was often greeted by resounding whistles as it entered the Piazza, and even at the height of the uprisings (1847) the Contrada was not allowed to participate in the National Festival in Florence, organized for an exchange of banners among the cities of the Grand Duchy of Tuscany, because of its insignia with a strong Hapsburg appeal. For these reasons, and out of confidence in the reforms granted by Pope Pius IX, the Tartuca replaced black with white: the colors of the coat of arms became similar to those of the Vatican City flag. But as early as August 1849 the Contrada reappeared with the 1739 insignia, receiving the usual broadside of whistles from the Piazza.

In the following years, the general discontent with the Contrada and its colors did not diminish, until in 1858 the Tortoise Contrada members, exasperated by the situation, decided to change the colors of the Contrada: in the Palio of August 16, the jockey Gaetano Bastianelli, known as Gano di Catera, wore a jacket with yellow and turquoise colors. On December 15 of the same year, the Civic Magistrate officially agreed that the Contrada insignia should bear a turtle on a "yellow and turquoise background, in equal parts, slightly arabesqued in black." On March 25, 1859, the Civic Community officially resolved that the new costumes of the Tortoise monturati would be yellow and turquoise in equal parts, without the black arabesques anymore.

The victory of Bachicche

The August 16, 1861 victory of Mario Bernini known as Bachicche for the Tartuca was the first of thirteen for the Sienese jockey; a clear victory in a truly turbulent Palio. Historians say that in that race all the jockeys had sold out to the Tartuca; after the victory, Bachicche was surrounded by a large crowd that wanted to lynch him, accusing him of being a traitor to the ideals of the Risorgimento: he was rescued by the grenadiers, and the banner was delivered to the Contrada only the next day.

The protests however did not cease, and the Tartuca refused to run the Palio on August 16, 1860. In 1861 the Tartuca returned to run the Palio of Siena, thanks in part to a new political climate due to the birth of the new Kingdom of Italy in March. It won on August 16 of that same year, thanks to jockey Mario Bernini known as Bachicche: it was the first victory under the new colors.

The current insignia of the Contrada of the Tortoise was completed in July 1887, on the occasion of the visit to Siena (and in particular to the Tartuca territory) of King Umberto I and his consort Margaret of Savoy. To pay homage to the royals, the Contrada requested the concession to be allowed to include the symbols of the House of Savoy in its insignia. The Heraldic Council of the Kingdom of Italy gave a favorable opinion, and communicated the description of the new Tartuca coat of arms:

Golden, to the tortoise in the natural passing over a sod of green, accompanied by 10 silver daisies, buttoned in gold and foliated in green, placed 3, 2, 2, and 3 in four rows in a band, alternating with 10 knots of Savoy in azure, with another similar one at the tip.

The present coat of arms took shape as follows: ten daisies, eleven Savoy knots, a Greek tortoise on a yellow and turquoise background.

== Wins ==
The Tartuca is officially recognized by the City of Siena with 48 and a half victories, the last of which was achieved in the extraordinary Palio of October 20, 2018, with Andrea Coghe known as Tempesta on Remorex. On the other hand, the victories the Contrada attributes to itself are 54 and a half, as it considers six victories obtained during the seventeenth century to be valid.

The "half victory" refers to the Palio of August 16, 1713, which was won in half with the Onda.

=== 17th century ===
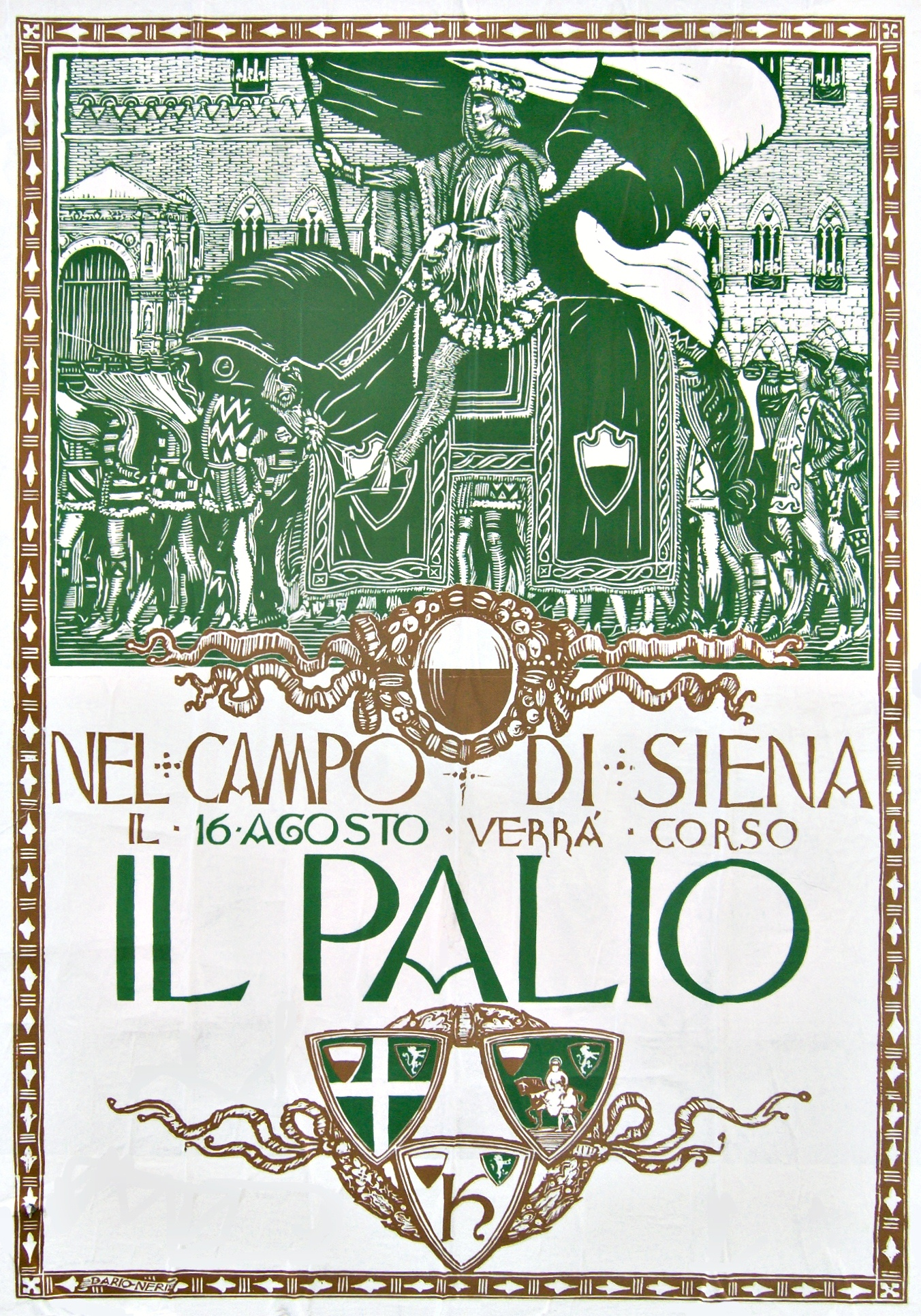
Poster announcing the Palio

The first victory that the Tartuca is credited with is the one in the Palio dedicated to Our Lady of Provenzano on August 15, 1633: this Palio is not listed by the City in the Roll of Victories of the Palio of Siena, although the City officially recognized it on February 14, 1896. The Contrada still keeps at its Museum the banner it won in 1633.

Not recognized by the Municipality are the victories of July 2, 1638, and 1643, of which there are no certain documents even of the actual performance.

The first officially recognized victory is the Palio of July 2, 1651, in which fifteen contrade participated. The winning banner was made of green damask fabric, worth 70 scudi, with the following represented: the coat of arms of Grand Duke Ferdinand II de' Medici, the "Balzana" (i.e., the coat of arms of Siena) and the Capitoline Wolf. In the seventeenth century, the Tartuca won again in 1678 and 1685; these were not the only victories, as the Contrada also won in 1664, (Note: There are historical doubts about whether the Palio of July 2, 1678, which the Tartuca counts among its victories, actually took place. For more details consult: Profeti, Sergio (1986). Lo straordinario: il Palio in più. Siena: Sunto.[ISBN unspecified]) 1670 and 1682: (Note: There is no documentary evidence to confirm the victory of the Tartuca, although some documents of the time seem to confirm the Palio was held. Cfr.: E. Giannelli; M. Picciafuochi (2006). "Ora come allora: carriere e fantini dalle origini del Palio ad oggi". Cantagalli. Archived from the original on June 29, 2021.) however, these victories are not considered official, although the Contrada attributes them to itself.

=== 18th century ===
The eighteenth century opened for the Tartuca with a victory: on July 2, 1700, it was Savino (innkeeper and owner of the winning horse, Grillo) who triumphed on the tuff of Piazza del Campo, in a Palio run by all seventeen Contrade with their own horses.

1713 was the year of the "half victory," the only case in the history of the Palio of Siena in which victory was awarded simultaneously to two Contrade. On August 16, the Onda won the race, but its jockey Giovan Battista Pistoi, known as Cappellaro, stopped halfway up the Palco dei Giudici; the Tartuca came second but its jockey Giovan Battista Papi, known as Ruglia, passed the Palco entirely. Thus a quarrel ensued between the people of the two Contrade, as the Tartuca asserted that the Onda had failed to perform a compulsory action required by the Regulations. Given the uncertainty, the awarding of the Palio was suspended until the judges' decision. The verdict was rendered on September 10, and it was affirmed that indeed the Tartuca's argument was correct, and that from that point forward anyone who did not also pass the Judges' Stage in its entirety would be disqualified. Believing, however, in the good faith of the Onda, the judges awarded the victory and the banner to both contrade, and again among the same they divided the 40 scudi prize money.

The Tartuca repeated its success the following year thanks to Niccolaio Luti known as Ignudo, but from then on it went through eight years of disappointment. The Contrada returned to success on May 1, 1722, in the extraordinary Palio run for the visit of the Bavarian Princes Charles Albert, Ferdinand Mary and John Theodore. One more success in 1725, in a Palio in which as many as eight horses arrived without a rider: for the Tartuca won Jacomo Mazzini known as Cerrino on Bellafronte. Then eight more years without success, until the victories of Giuseppe Pistoi known as Figlio di Cappellaro in 1733 and Giuseppe Mazzini in 1735. It was then that the longest period without victories began for the Tartuca: twenty-one years of waiting before it could win a banner. In fact, one had to wait until July 4, 1756, before seeing another Tartuca success: the creators were jockey Antonio Vigni known as Luchino and Giuseppe Vichi's starry Morello.

In the second half of the century came four more victories: 1769, 1786, 1790 and 1797. At the end of the eighteenth century the official victories were 141/2, those that the Contrada attributed to itself were 201/2.

=== 19th century ===
Just as the 18th century, the 19th century opened with a victory for the Contrada of Castelvecchio. On August 17, 1800, it was Francesco Sucini, known as Polpettino, who won by mounting a burnt bay owned by Giuseppe Brecchi. The victory opened a golden period for the Tartuca, which won consistently six more times until 1817, including an extraordinary Palio run with horses without a rider in 1809. Leading the victories in 1813 and 1817 was the celebrated Niccolò Chiarini known as Caino, one of the most successful jockeys in the centuries-long history of the Palio of Siena. (Note: With 14 wins, on par with Andrea Degortes known as Aceto and Pavolo Roncucci known as Pavolino, he is behind only Bastiancino and Gobbo Saragiolo (15 wins).)

The winning streak came to an abrupt halt, and the Contrada remained dry for nineteen years. It was thanks to Giovanni Brandani, known as Pipistrello, that rejoicing returned to Castelvecchio on July 3, 1836: a clear-cut victory, achieved thanks to a leading race from the first bend in San Martino.

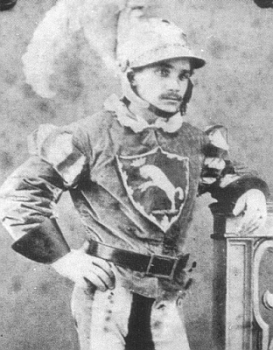
Leggerino: he won with the Tartuca in 1886

The Tartuca failed to regain the same consistency of victories as in the first two decades of the century, and the next victory came seven years later with Francesco Bianchini known as Campanino. The dark period was not over, and the Contrada won again after another eighteen years in August 1861, thanks to Mario Bernini known as Bachicche: it was the turbulent victory with the new yellow and turquoise colors.

On August 20, 1872, came the twentieth and a half victory, thanks to Pietro Locchi known as Paolaccino. After another fourteen years, another fortunate period for the Tartuca began on July 4, 1886, similar to that experienced at the beginning of the century. In fact, Antonio Salmoria known as Leggerino, on the horse Carbonello, gave the first of two victories that won the first "coat" in Tartuca history; on August 16 it was Pietro Fosci known as Pietrino d'Arezzo on Farfallina who repeated the victory in the Palio di Provenzano. The 19th century ended with four more victories: in 1889 and 1991 with Francesco Ceppatelli known as Tabarre, in 1895 with Ansano Giovannelli known as Ansanello, and in 1898 with Angelo Volpi known as Bellino.

The total victories achieved by the Contrada of the Tortoise in the nineteenth century were seventeen: three fewer than Onda and Torre, the only ones to have won more during the century. At this time the total number of victories recognized for the Tartuca was 311/2.

=== 1900s ===
Similarly to what happened in the previous two centuries, even at the beginning in the twentieth century the Tartuca was not slow to win: August 16, 1902, was the day of the first Tartuca success of Domenico Fradiacono, known as Scansino. The victory was celebrated by carrying around the Contrada streets the banner he had just won and the one that had been won exactly one hundred years earlier (thanks to Tommaso Felloni known as Biggéri). Scansino was able to repeat his feat eight years later, scoring his last victory in the Piazza, the second in the Tartuca's century.

The Palio di Siena was suspended from 1915 to 1918 because of World War I, but the last victory before the suspension was Tartuca's own. The triumphant winner was Aldo Mantovani known as Bubbolo, who received the lavish compensation (for the time) of 1,000 liras from the Contrada. The return to racing was not positive for the Tartuca: in fact, it had to wait for a new victory until 1930, thanks to Fernando Leoni known as Ganascia.

Before the relationship with the Tartuca broke off for good in 1938, the jockey from Monticello Amiata won the second "coat" in Tartuca history: in fact, he won both ordinary Palios in 1933, both times riding the horse Folco (on his debut at the Palio di Siena).

In the July race, the pair started off lightning fast and in a few strides broke away from their rivals. Only one contrada was able to keep up with the Tartuca: the Lupa, which had jockey Angelo Meloni, known as Picino, riding in the last race of the carriera. Between the two jockeys, a historic sinewy struggle opened up: Ganascia managed to withstand the blows as best he could and, thanks in part to his sturdy build, knocked his opponent to the tuff. Having gotten rid of the obstacle, Ganascia was able to end his race on a high note.

In August, fortune literally kissed the contrada of Castelvecchio, reassigning Folco to it once again. The leadership had no doubts in recalling Ganascia; the most formidable opponent was still the Lupa with the fast barber Ruello mounted by Tripoli Torrini known as Tripolino. Shortly, after the initial spurt by Montone, the Palio became a two-way fight between Tartuca and Lupa, but again Ganascia and Folco were unbeatable and reached the third and final flag first. At the end of his race, the jockey was rewarded by the Contrada with furniture for a new bedroom.

After the alliance "T.O.N.O." (the Tartuca, Oca, Nicchio and Onda group) the Tartuca remained dry for eighteen years (although from 1940 to 1944 there was suspension due to World War II). On August 16, 1951, Giuseppe Gentili, known as Ciancone, made up for it: the jockey from Manziana had already won on July 2 for the Pantera, and thanks to his victory in the Palio dell'Assunta he centered his own personal "coat." Two years later the Tartuca won in July, thanks to Albano Nucciotti known as Ranco on Tarantella. On the day of Ganascia's farewell to the Palio, Ranco knew how to take advantage of Vittorino's fall at the second bend of San Martino, leading the race to the end.

After fourteen years, and twenty-nine Palios to wait, the Contrada of Castelvecchio won July 2, 1967, banner thanks to Leonardo Viti known as Canapino. The race did not get off to the best start for the Tartuca, which at the entrance of the run-up Lupa was even turned around. Nevertheless, Canapino did not give up and attempted a desperate comeback. Aquila and Bruco alternated in the lead, until a general fall brought the Lupa to the front and suddenly put the Tartuca back in the race. Lupa and Aquila were overtaken at the beginning of the third lap by Istrice and Civetta. The denouement of the race was unbelievable: the jockeys of Istrice and Civetta, Tristezza and Bazza respectively, got in each other's way and at the curve of San Martino they could not even turn, ending up straight into the "Chiasso Largo." (Note: In Siena, Via Rinaldini, one of the many streets leading to Piazza del Campo, is called precisely "Chiasso Largo.") The Lupa returned to the lead, but the exhausted horse Danube stopped, causing the jockey Canapetta to fall. At that point Canapino found himself incredulously in the lead and with the zucchino (Note: The zucchino is the helmet with the Contrada colors that jockeys are equipped with.) over his eyes, he cut the third flag giving the Tartuca a Palio that seemed already lost.

On July 2, 1972, it was the turn of the "King of the Square" Aceto. After an initial fall at the starting block during the stages of the mossa, the Sardinian jockey managed to get off to a good start, turning second at the first bend of San Martino. Miraculously remaining on Mirabella's back after a risky turn of the Casato, Aceto took the lead and remained there until the beginning of the third lap. At that point he began a violent clash with Tristezza del Montone who took the lead. The surprise occurred at the last turn of St. Martin's: the Montone's horse refused to turn and Aceto was still back in front. The last attack came from Canapino della Lupa, but the jockey from Tartuchino managed to sprint ahead, scoring the forty-first and a half victory in the history of Castelvecchio.

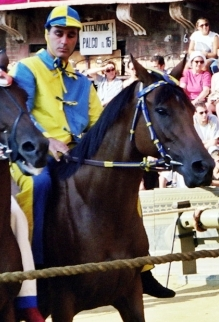
Il Bufera

The 1970s and 1980s did not bring any more successes, and the Tartuca had to wait nineteen years and one day for a new banner. On July 3, 1991, credit was due to Salvatore Ladu known as Cianchino, a pupil of the multiple winner Ciancone. Ladu had to deal with rival Chiocciola, whose jockey Falchino took care to block him at the mossa. Taking advantage of this was Lupa with Il Bufera on Careca, who led for most of his race until the last Casato. There Cianchino, in the meantime rid of Falchino's obstacle, threaded through the Lupa's duo from the inside, achieving his sixth personal success.

The Tartuca's 20th century closed with Dario Colagè's victory on August 16, 1994: Il Bufera on Delfort Song won his fourth consecutive appearance with the Contrada di Castelvecchio.

Throughout the twentieth century the Tartuca won twelve Palii, bringing the total tally of official victories to 431/2.

=== 2000s ===
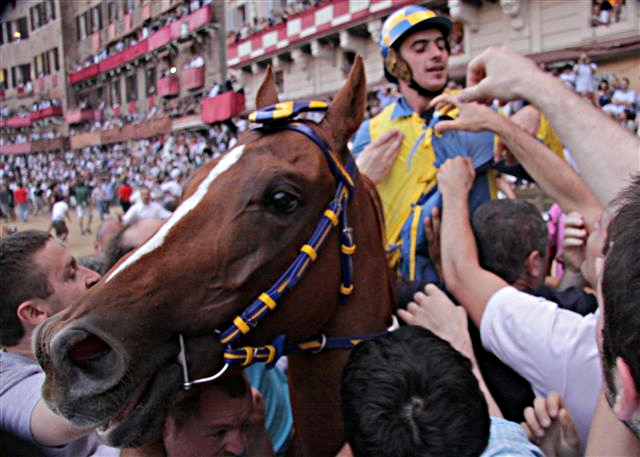
Gingillo on Già del Menhir

The first Tartuca victory of the new millennium was dated August 16, 2002, by Luigi Bruschelli, known as Trecciolino, on Berio. The pair ended the race with a time of 1'13"86, among the fastest ever. Trecciolino was able to repeat his performance after only two years on Alesandra, a mare capable of holding her own against the two best-rated Zodiach and Berio.

Another victory came on July 2, 2009: Giuseppe Zedde a.k.a. Gingillo, in his tenth experience in the Piazza on the horse Già del Menhir, managed to score the third success of the 21st century for the Contrada of Castelvecchio. On August 16, 2010, the Tartuca scored another victory, thanks to jockey Luigi Bruschelli known as Trecciolino on the horse Istriceddu.

In the extraordinary Palio run on October 20, 2018, to commemorate the Centennial of World War I, the Tartuca won thanks to the horse without a rider Remorex, ridden at the starting block by Andrea Coghe known as Tempesta. The Tartuca had not won an extraordinary Palio since May 14, 1809, and this was the first time it won with a horse without a rider.

Due to the five wins in the 21st century, the Tartuca's officially recognized victories are 481/2.

== Chronology of victories ==
- Official victories: victories recognized by the City of Siena, and attested in the "Roll of Victories of the Palio of Siena".

Number of the win	Date	Jockey	Horse
1	July 2, 1651	? (Note: The Tartuca indicates as jockey Simone Mastacchi known as Mone, but there is no certainty. Cfr. I Palii con i cavalli fino al 1691, p. 12.)	?
2	July 2, 1678	Pavolo Roncucci known as Pavolino	?
3	July 2, 1685	Giovan Battista Landi known as Granchio	Black Horse of the Nuns of Castelvecchio
4	July 2, 1700	Savino Oste	Grillo
Wins in the 17th century: 4
4^{1/2}	August 16, 1713	Giovan Battista Papi known as Ruglia	Montalcino
5^{1/2}	July 2, 1714	Niccolaio Luti known as Ignudo	Pizzirullo
6^{1/2}	May 1, 1722	Giuseppe Maria Bartaletti known as Strega	Belladonna
7^{1/2}	July 2, 1725	Jacomo Mazzini known as Cerrino	Bellafronte
8^{1/2}	July 2, 1733	Giuseppe Pistoi known as Figlio di Cappellaro	Black horse from Paris
9^{1/2}	July 2, 1735	Giuseppe Mazzini	Black horse from Siena
10^{1/2}	July 4, 1756	Antonio Vigni known as Luchino	Starry Black horse of Vichi
11^{1/2}	July 2, 1769	Luigi Sucini known as Nacche	Bay horse of Mancini
12^{1/2}	July 2, 1786	Isidoro Bianchini known as Dorino	Dun horse of Dei
13^{1/2}	August 16, 1790	Isidoro Bianchini known as Dorino	Starry Black horse of Bruttini
14^{1/2}	July 2, 1797	Angelo Giusti known as Ciocio	Black horse of Ceccarelli
15^{1/2}	August 17, 1800	Francesco Sucini known as Polpettino	Bay horse of Brecchi
Wins in the 18th century: 11^{1/2}
16^{1/2}	July 2, 1802	Tommaso Felloni known as Biggéri	Dapple-gray horse (Note: According to the definition of the Vocabolario of Nicola Zingarelli, the dapple-gray coat is: dark gray, scattered with small and numerous white spots.) of Valacchi
17^{1/2}	August 20, 1804	Giuseppe Menghetti known as Giuseppetto	Chestnut horse of Ricci
18^{1/2}	June 4, 1809	Extraordinary Palio run with horses without a rider	Rondinello
19^{1/2}	August 16, 1812	Luigi Brandani known as Cicciolesso	Black horse of Mariotti
20^{1/2}	August 16, 1813	Niccolò Chiarini known as Caino	Dark bay horse of Lippi
21^{1/2}	July 2, 1817	Niccolò Chiarini known as Caino	Dark bay horse of Pagliai
22^{1/2}	July 3, 1836	Giovanni Brandani known as Pipistrello	Black horse of Cubattoli
23^{1/2}	July 2, 1843	Francesco Bianchini known as Campanino	Black horse of Riccucci
24^{1/2}	August 16, 1861	Mario Bernini known as Bachicche	Dapple-gray horse of Bandini
25^{1/2}	August 20, 1872	Pietro Locchi known as Paolaccino	Black horse of Marchetti
26^{1/2}	July 4, 1886	Antonio Salmoria known as Leggerino	Carbonello
27^{1/2}	August 16, 1886	Pietro Fosci known as Pietrino d'Arezzo	Farfallina
28^{1/2}	July 4, 1889	Francesco Ceppatelli known as Tabarre	Gemma
29^{1/2}	August 16, 1891	Francesco Ceppatelli known as Tabarre	Farfallina
30^{1/2}	August 16, 1895	Ansano Giovannelli known as Ansanello	Bay horse of Manetti
31^{1/2}	August 16, 1898	Angelo Volpi known as Bellino	Gamba di ferro (Iron Leg)
Wins in the 19th century: 16
32^{1/2}	August 16, 1902	Domenico Fradiacono known as Scansino	Bay horse with a star on the forehead
33^{1/2}	August 16, 1910	Domenico Fradiacono known as Scansino	Stella
34^{1/2}	August 16, 1914	Aldo Mantovani known as Bubbolo	Bay horse with a star on the forehead
35^{1/2}	August 16, 1930	Fernando Leoni known as Ganascia	Carnera
36^{1/2}	July 2, 1933	Fernando Leoni known as Ganascia	Folco
37^{1/2}	August 16, 1933	Fernando Leoni known as Ganascia	Folco
38^{1/2}	August 16, 1951	Giuseppe Gentili known as Ciancone	Bagnorea
39^{1/2}	July 2, 1953	Albano Nucciotti known as Ranco	Tarantella
40^{1/2}	July 2, 1967	Leonardo Viti known as Canapino	Ettore
41^{1/2}	July 2, 1972	Andrea Degortes known as Aceto	Mirabella
42^{1/2}	July 3, 1991	Salvatore Ladu known as Cianchino	Uberto
43^{1/2}	August 16, 1994	Dario Colagè known as Il Bufera	Delfort Song
Wins in the 20th century: 12
44^{1/2}	August 16, 2002	Luigi Bruschelli known as Trecciolino	Berio
45^{1/2}	August 16, 2004	Luigi Bruschelli known as Trecciolino	Alesandra
46^{1/2}	July 2, 2009	Giuseppe Zedde known as Gingillo	Già del Menhir
47^{1/2}	August 16, 2010	Luigi Bruschelli known as Trecciolino	Istriceddu
48^{1/2}	October 20, 2018	Andrea Coghe known as Tempesta	Remorex (horse without a rider)
Wins in the 21st century: 5

- Unofficial victories: victories in Palii that are not considered official, but which the Contrada nonetheless attributes to itself.

Number of the win	Date	Jockey	Horse
1	August 15, 1633	?	?
2	July 2, 1638	?	?
3	July 2, 1643	?	?
4	July 2, 1664	?	?
5	July 2, 1670	Jockey from Monterotondo	Dapple-gray horse of the priest of Monterotondo
6	July 2, 1682	Domenico Bacchini known as Bacchino	?

== Statistics ==
The following statistics are up to and including the Palio di Siena on October 20, 2018.

- Throughout its history, the Tartuca has managed to "fare cappotto" (that is, win the two ordinary Palios in July and August) on two occasions: in 1886 and 1933. In 1886 thanks to the victories of Antonio Salmoria known as Leggerino on Carbonello (July 4) and Pietro Fosci known as Pietrino d'Arezzo on Farfallina (August 16); in 1933 with the double success of Fernando Leoni known as Ganascia in both Palii (July 2 and August 16) on Folco.
- The Tartuca is the third Contrada of Siena in number of victories (481/2), behind only the Oca (65) and Chiocciola (51).
- Along with the Oca, the Tartuca has never had the "kerchief" – that is, it has never been the Contrada that has not won the Palio since the largest number of years.
- The Tartuca is the Contrada that has lost the least number of Palii consecutively, having waited no more than 23 Palii before winning again (between July 2, 1817, and July 3, 1836). In first place is the Giraffe with 62 waiting Palios (from August 16, 1807, to July 2, 1852). (Note: The statistics include all the palii run since 1722, which is when it has been possible to have the list of participating contrade without interruption. Cfr.: "Massimo numero di Palii persi consecutivamente". ilpalio.org. Archived from the original on July 7, 2013.)
- The Tartuca's last victory in an extraordinary Palio is dated October 20, 2018, thanks to Remorex, ridden at the starting block by Andrea Coghe known as Tempesta (the previous one was the extraordinary Palio of June 4, 1809, run by all seventeen Contrade with horses without a rider, and was won by Rondinello). The last victory in July was on July 2, 2009, thanks to Giuseppe Zedde known as Gingillo; the last in August was on August 16, 2010, with Luigi Bruschelli known as Trecciolino.
- The most victorious jockeys in the history of the Tartuca are Fernando Leoni known as Ganascia and Luigi Bruschelli known as Trecciolino, both with three successes. The former won on August 16, 1930, in addition to the "coat" in 1933; the latter won on August 16, 2002, 2004 and 2010. The jockey who has raced the most times for the Contrada is Leonardo Viti known as Canapino, with ten appearances.
- The Tartuca has been disqualified on four occasions: after the August 16, 1991, Palio (one disqualifying Palio); after the July 3, 1997, Palio (two disqualifying Palios); after the August 16, 1997, Palio (one disqualifying Palio); and after the July 2, 2018, Palio (two disqualifying Palios). It was disqualified for two Palios after the Palio of August 20, 1945, but the suspension was lifted on April 24, 1946.
- The Contrada of the Tartuca has won the "Masgalano" (i.e., the award given to the Contrada whose Comparsa is found to be the "best" for elegance, dignity of deportment and coordination during both Historical Parades preceding the Palio) on three occasions: 1954, 1988, 1995.

== See also ==
- Palio of Siena
- Grand Duchy of Tuscany
- Contrade of Siena
- Republic of Siena

== Bibliography ==
- AA. VV. (2002). Il costume di un popolo: storia, colori e comparse. Siena: Contrada della Tartuca.[ISBN unspecified]
- Memoria istorico – cronologia della Tartuca pubblicata in occasione della solenne consacrazione della Chiesa di detta Contrada. Siena: Stamperia Giovanni Rossi. 1818.[ISBN unspecified]
- Notizie su le Contrade di Siena. Siena: Tip. Carlo Nava. 1896.[ISBN unspecified]
- Barbarulli, Giordano Bruno (2005). Notizie storiche sulla Contrada della Tartuca: dalle origini al XXI secolo. Siena: Contrada della Tartuca.[ISBN unspecified]
- Ceccarelli, Francesco (2000). Siena, lo spazio delle contrade: i confini urbani del Palio, delimitazioni settecentesche e nuove contese territoriali. Siena: Pacini.
- Cecchini, Giovanni; Dario Neri (1958). Il palio di Siena. Siena: Banca Monte dei Paschi di Siena.[ISBN unspecified]
- Filiani, Roberto (2000). "Daccelo!" – Cronache, personaggi e numeri di un secolo di palio. Siena: Computer Copy.[ISBN unspecified]
- Filiani, Roberto; Natale Zaffaroni (2002). Con la rivale in campo (1990–1999). Siena: Il Leccio.
- Filiani, Roberto; Natale Zaffaroni (2003). Con la rivale in campo (1960–1989). Siena: Il Leccio.
- Giannelli, Enrico; Maurizio Picciafuochi (2006). Ora come allora: carriere e fantini dalle origini del Palio ad oggi. Cantagalli.
- Grassi, Virgilio (1950). I Confini delle contrade secondo il Bando di Violante Beatrice di Baviera. Siena: Edizioni Amici del Palio.[ISBN unspecified]
- Martinelli, Roberto (2008). Palio e disposizione normative (PDF). Siena: Sunto. Archived from the original (PDF) on March 4, 2016.
- Orlando Papei (2016). I Palii con i cavalli fino al 1691. Riflessioni e altre piccole curiosità (PDF). Siena: Ilpalio.org. [ISBN unspecified]
- Pecci, Giovanni Antonio (2000) [1723]. Relazione distinta delle quarantadue contrade solite far comparsa agli spettacoli, nelle quali vien distribuito tutto il popolo di Siena. Betti.
- Savelli, Aurora (2008). Siena: il popolo e le contrade (XVI-XX secolo). Firenze: Leo S. Olschki.
- Torriti, Piero (1988). Tutta Siena contrada per contrada. Firenze: Bonechi – Edizioni "Il Turismo".
- Zazzeroni, Antonio (1980). L'araldica delle contrade di Siena. Firenze: Scala.
- Zazzeroni, Antonio (1980). Le Carriere nel Campo e le feste Senesi dal 1650 al 1914. Siena: Periccioli.[ISBN unspecified]
