= Giovanni Atzeni =

Italian jockey (born 1985)

Giovanni Atzeni (born 12 April 1985, Nagold, Germany), also known as Tittia, is an Italian Palio jockey.

Atzeni is famous for winning two consecutive races during Il Palio di Siena in 2013, subsequently stopping his rival Luigi Bruschelli from matching the 200-year-old record of 14 Palio wins.

== Palio Victories ==
- 2 July 2007 - winning for Nobile Contrada dell'Oca
- 2 July 2011 - winning for Nobile Contrada dell'Oca
- 2 July 2013 - winning for Nobile Contrada dell'Oca
- 16 August 2013 - winning for Contrada Capitana dell'Onda
- 17 August 2015 - winning for Contrada della Selva
- 2 July 2019 - winning for Imperiale Contrada della Giraffa
- 16 August 2019 - winning for Contrada della Selva
- 2 July 2022 - winning for Contrada del Drago
- 17 August 2022 - winning for Contrada del Leocorno
- 3 July 2025 - winning for Contrada dell'Oca
- 3 July 2026 - winning for Contrada del Aquila
- 18 August 2026 - winning for Contrada del Nicchio
