= Silvano Vigni =

Italian jockey (born 1954)

Silvano Vigni (born 7 August 1954 in Monteroni d'Arbia, Italy, known as Bastiano) is a retired Italian Palio jockey, and one of the most notorious competitors in Il Palio Di Siena in the 20th century with a strong rivalry with another rider, Andrea Degortes (known as Aceto). Silvano won 5 Palios between 1978 and 1990.

== Palio Victories ==
- 3 July 1978 - winning for Contrade Della Selva
- 7 September 1980 - winning for Contrade Della Selva
- 2 July 1981 - winning for Contrade Dell' Aquila
- 3 July 1983 - winning for Contrade Della Leocorno
- 2 July 1990 - winning for Contrade Della Giraffa
