= Andrea Degortes =

Italian jockey

Andrea Degortes, known as Aceto (born May 1, 1943, in Olbia, Italy), is a retired Italian Palio jockey, and the modern-day record holder for greatest number of wins in the Palio di Siena with 14 victories between 1965 and 1992.

== Palio Victories ==
- 2 July 1965 - winning for Contrade Dell' Aquila
- 16 August 1968 - winning for Contrade Dell' Oca
- 21 September 1969 - winning for Contrade Dell' Oca
- 2 July 1972 - winning for Contrade Della Tartuca
- 17 September 1972 - winning for Contrade Dell' Istrice
- 16 August 1974 - winning for Contrade Della Selva
- 16 August 1975 - winning for Contrade Della Chioccciola
- 16 August 1976 - winning for Contrade Della Civetta
- 16 August 1977 - winning for Contrade Dell' Oca
- 16 August 1979 - winning for Contrade Dell' Aquila
- 16 August 1980 - winning for Contrade Della Leocorno
- 2 July 1984 - winning for Contrade Dell' Oca
- 2 July 1985 - winning for Contrade Dell' Oca
- 3 July 1992 - winning for Contrade Dell' Aquila
