= Luigi Bruschelli =

Italian jockey (born 1968)

Luigi Bruschelli (born 27 December 1968, Siena, Italy; known as "Trecciolino" or "Gigi") is an Italian jockey, and is the most successful active jockey in the Palio di Siena with 13 wins between 1996 and 2012. But in more recent times has been mired by scandal around doping and animal cruelty. An investigation, started in July 2015 concluded in June 2019, found him guilty and sentenced him to four years and 10 months of prison.

== Palio Victories ==
- 2 July 1996 - winning for Contrade Dell' Oca
- 2 July 1998 - winning for Contrade Dell' Oca
- 2 July 1999 - winning for Contrade Dell' Oca
- 2 July 2000 - winning for Contrade Dell' Istrice
- 2 July 2001 - winning for Contrade Della Leocorno
- 16 August 2002 - winning for Contrade Della Tartuca
- 16 August 2003 - winning for Contrade Della Bruco
- 16 August 2004 - winning for Contrade Dell Tartuca
- 2 July 2005 - winning for Contrade Della Bruco
- 16 August 2005 - winning for Contrade Della Torre
- 2 July 2008 - winning for Contrade Dell' Istrice
- 16 August 2010 - winning for Contrade Della Tartuca
- 2 July 2012 - winning for Contrade Dell' Onda

== Bibliography ==
- The Palio - records of Palio wins and jockey information.
- Trecciolino's July 2012 Palio win
