= Torre di Roccabruna =

The Torre di Roccabruna is a medieval tower in Siena, central Tuscany, Italy.

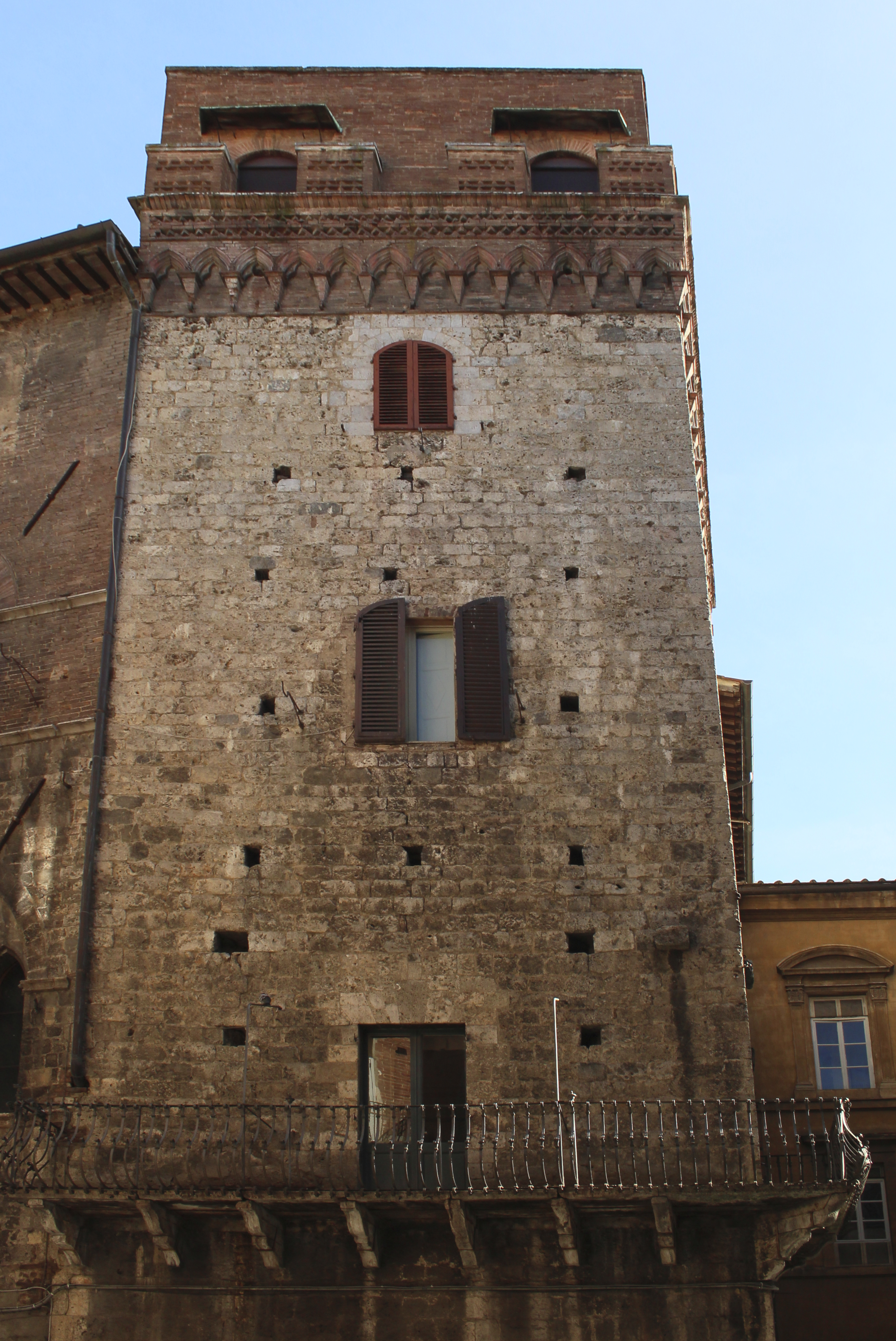
The tower Torre di Roccabruna

== History ==
Once, the Bruna or Rocca Bruna tower was one of the highest towers in the city in competition with the tower of Mangia, located not so far from Piazza del Campo. Like most of Siena's towers, it was "shortened" in the sixteenth century. It has belonged to the Marconi family, the Biringucci and the Tommasi, then the noble Mino Campioni from the early eighteenth century, and finally passed to the Sansedoni, owners of the nearby palace. Regarding the origin of the tower's name various hypotheses have been made: one concerns a possible ancient name of the Montone valley, like the Selvata Bruna valley.

Ancient legends describe an underground link with Castelvecchio, Castel Montone and Camollia, which was later covered with rubble and used construction materials. The vestment on the cross of Travaglio is entirely in stone, gray, with a crenellated crowning, affixed after the shortening.

Nowadays the tower and its apartments are privately owned by a noble Senese family and they rent it for events, celebrations, and funerals.
