= Bottini of Siena =

Underground aqueducts in Siena, Italy

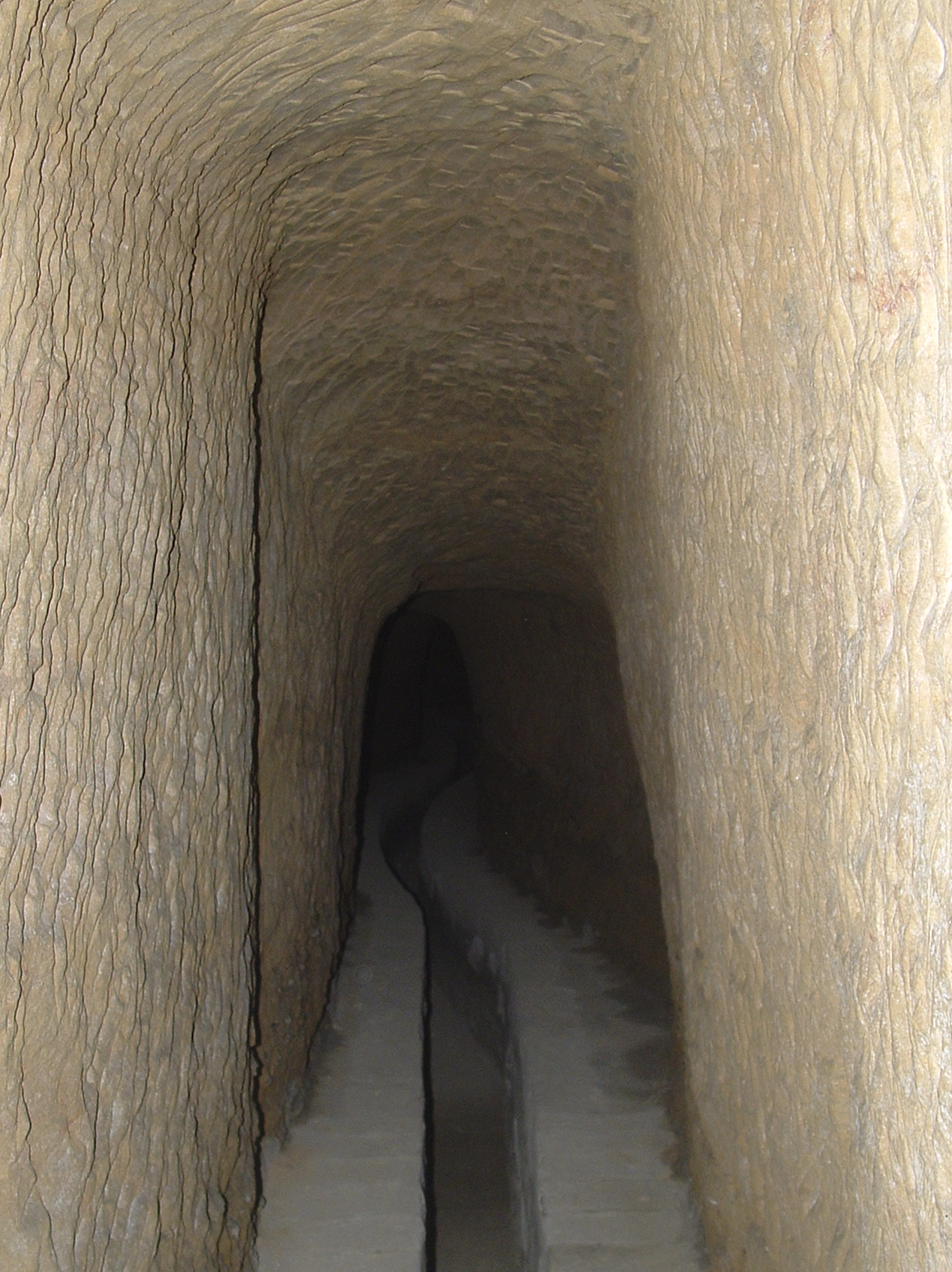
Dug Bottino in the canal system of the Bottino di Fonte Gaia

The Bottini di Siena are a complex system of medieval underground aqueducts for the water supply of the city of Siena with a total length of 25 kilometres (16 mi). The system used to be the main water supply of the entire city of Siena until 1914 and nowadays continues to supply water to the fountains of Siena.

== Structure of the underground aqueduct system ==
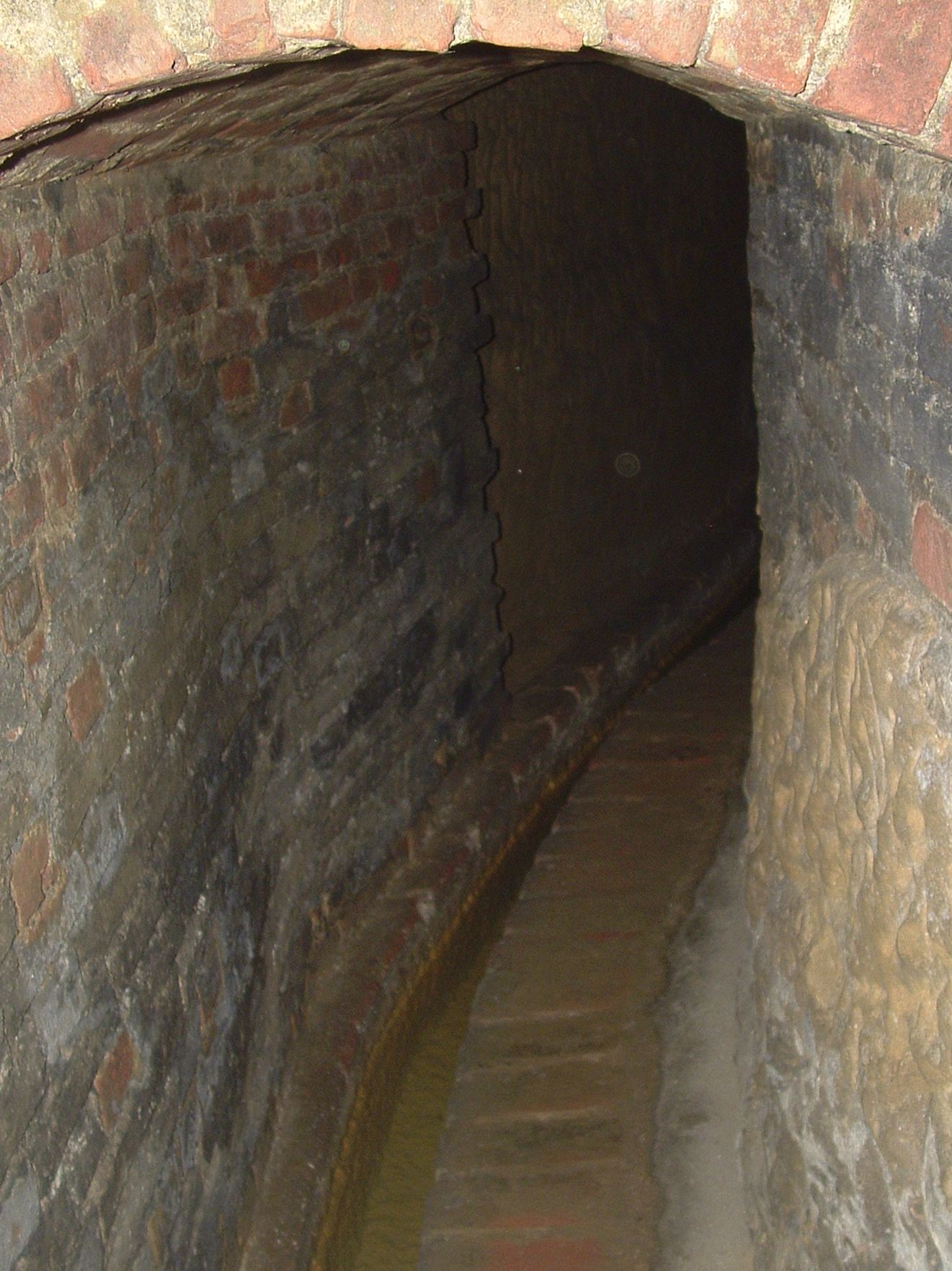
Bricked section of the Bottino di Fonte Gaia

It is named after the Latin word buctinus, used for the first time in 1226, and the word botte (Italian for "barrels"), which describes the shape of the arched walls, mostly made of terracotta, composing the roofs of the underground tunnels of the aqueduct. The underground canal system of the Bottini (singular Bottino ) consists of several waterways which supply the wells within the city walls of Siena and in their vicinity, bringing water from sources located several miles away. The Bottini collect rainwater through the permeable roof, carrying it into the city, divert part of the Tressa, Staggia and Arbia rivers towards the city of Siena, collecting rainwater through the permeable roof along the way. This complex underground system was not only used to supply the city with drinking water, but also for the operation of many water-dependent medieval artisan industries (like dyers and leather workers), for cleaning and fire prevention activities, irrigation and agriculture, which would otherwise have been impossible in a city like Siena, located kilometers away from the nearest watercourse.

The Bottini are not to be seen as a uniform canal system. In addition to the main veins Bottino maestro di Fonte Gaia and Bottino maestro di Fontebranda and their side arms (called Ramo, plural rami) there are many independent Bottini that only feed individual fountains. The watercourses are not identical to the streets of Siena. Most of the canals (called Gorello, plural: gorelli) are about 20 to 30 centimetres (8 to 12 in) wide and are mostly located in brick-walled corridors that are about 50 to 90 cm (20 to 35 in) wide. The height of the corridors varies from 1.5 to 2 m (5 to 7 ft). The Bottini are not closed off from the outside world, there are several air shafts in each Bottino (called smiraglio, pl.: smiragli, sometimes also called occhio, pl.: occhi).

The Bottino maestro di Fonte Gaia is supplied by three main tributaries from Colombaio (also del Castagno, with 5.75 km (3.6 mi) of maximum distance from Fonte Gaia), Michele a Quarto (also San Dalmazio) and Uopini, which is close to the Fontebecci fountain. Smaller tributaries are that of Vico Alto (before Fontebecci in the Ramo di Colombaio) and those of Acqua Calda, Marciano and Poggiarello (between Fontebecci and Porta Camollia). The entire route has a constant incline of 1 ‰ (1 m of difference in height over 1 km length) and transports 2.7 litres (0.71 US gal) per second. The excavations took place starting from two different points. One started from the Piazza del Campo to the north, while the other one starts from Santa Petronilla (near the Antiporto di Camollia), in the direction of Fonte Gaia (south) and in the direction of Fontebecci (north).

The Bottino maestro di Fontebranda is the shortest (most distant point 3.8 km (2.4 mi) north of Fontebranda), oldest and deepest of the two main canals. It starts north of the city walls and transports 3.5 L (0.92 US gal) per second. The most important tributary is the Ramo di Chiarenna, other important tributaries are those of Santa Petronilla and San Prospero.

== History ==
=== First excavations and birth of the medieval aqueduct system ===
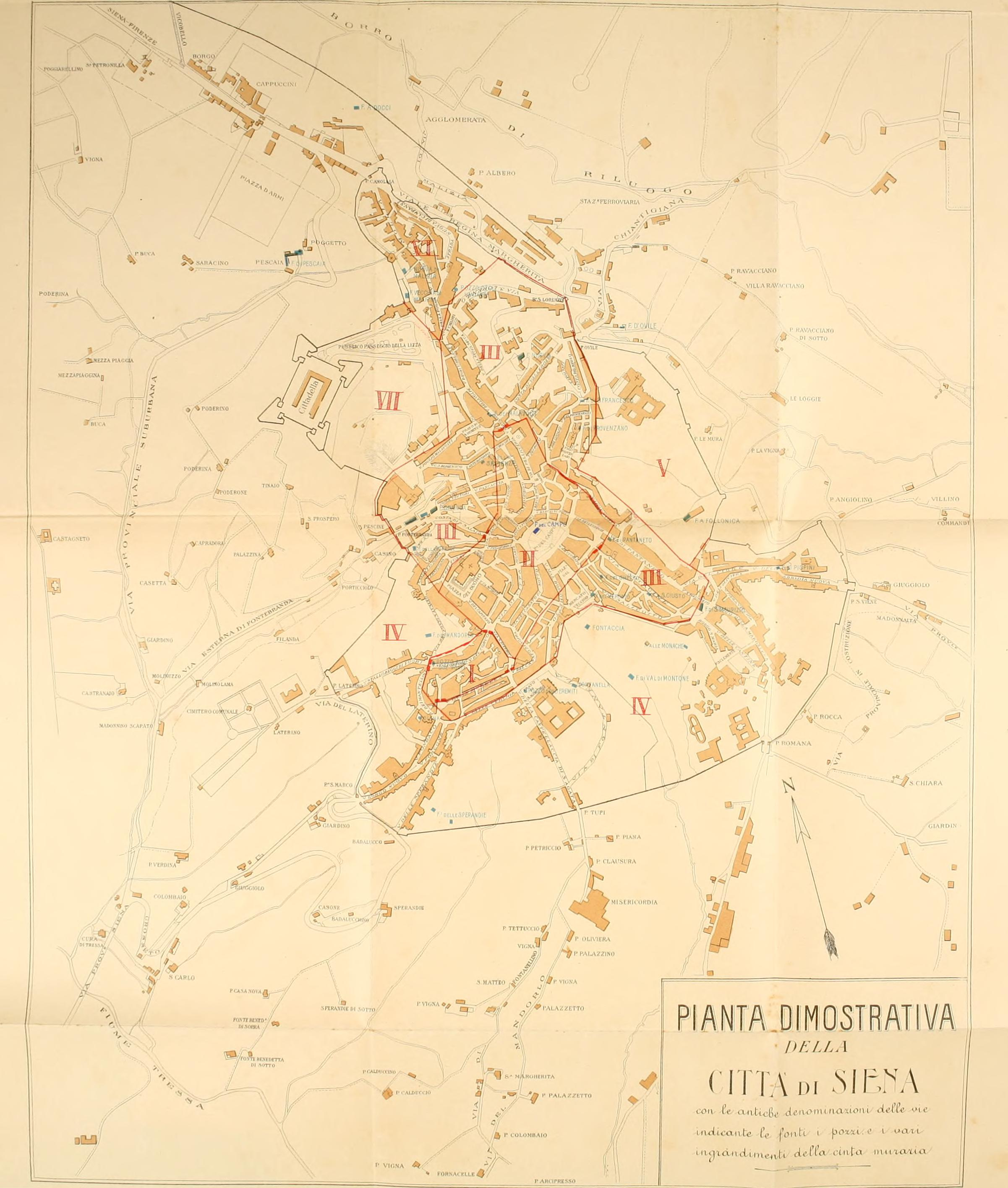
Map of the fountains of Siena in 1906

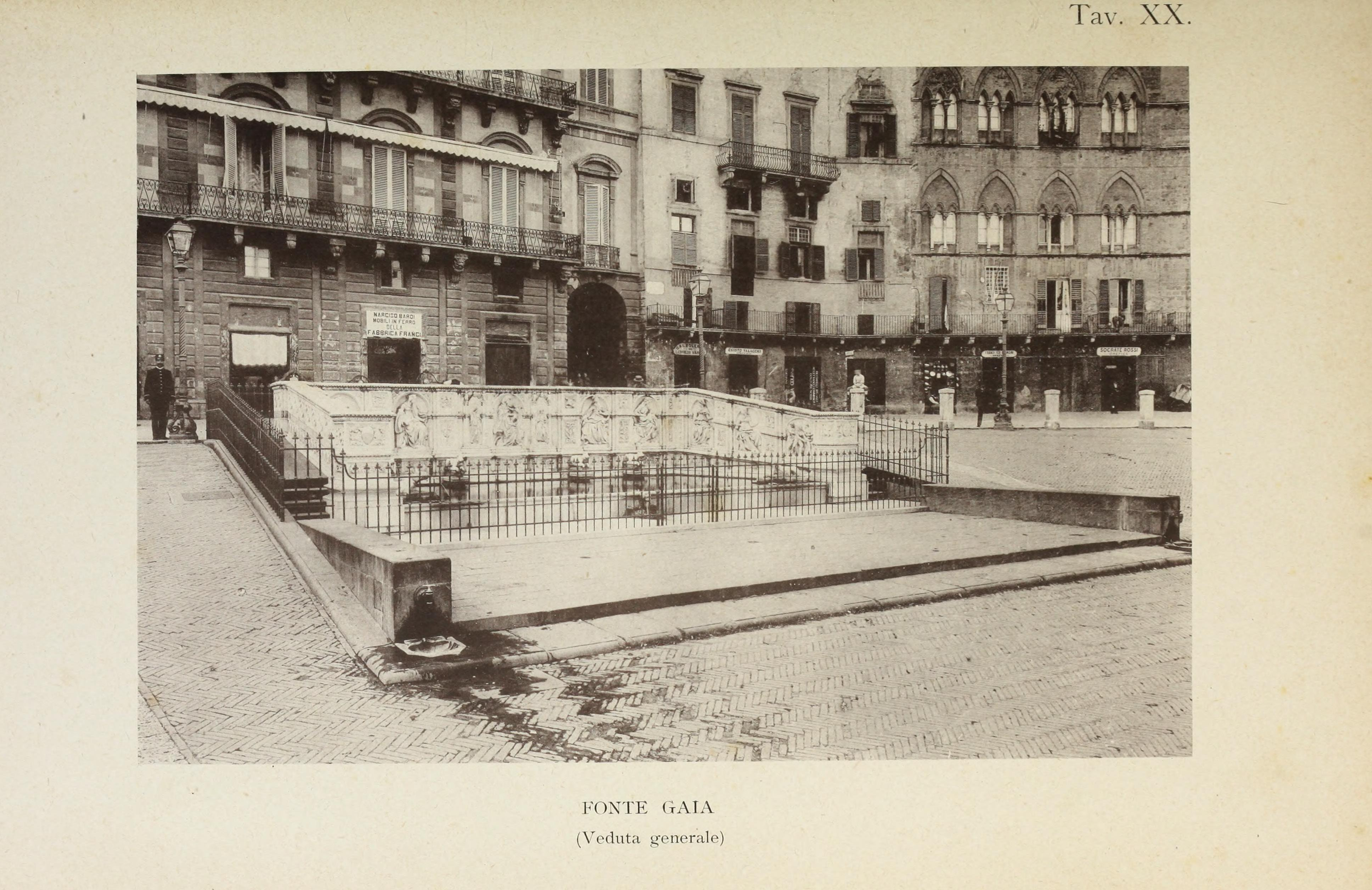
Fonte Gaia in 1906

The first underground watercourses already existed in the 4th century, during the Roman period, when Siena was still limited to the area of Castelvecchio. The Fontanella fountain is mentioned here in 394. The reason for the construction of the aqueduct system in the Middle Ages was mainly due to the shortage of water in the city of Siena, which experienced a period of strong population growth starting from the 11th century.

They were first documented with their Latin name in 1226 as Buctinus. Bricked Bottini were documented during the expansion works of Fontebranda in 1246 when thousands of stones were used. Further work on the tributaries took place in March 1250, here work was carried out on the wells of Val di Montone, Val di Follonica, Fontebranda, Pescaia and Vetrice, with that of Pescaia on the two main arms attached (Bottino di Fonte Gaia and Bottino di Fontebranda). In 1267 there were attempts to direct the waters of the Merse to Siena, but these plans failed shortly afterwards. After that, the focus was again on repairing the existing waterways. New water veins were found in 1274, which later led to the construction of the Fontenuova and Fonte d'Ovile fountains.

=== Development and evolution of the Bottini ===
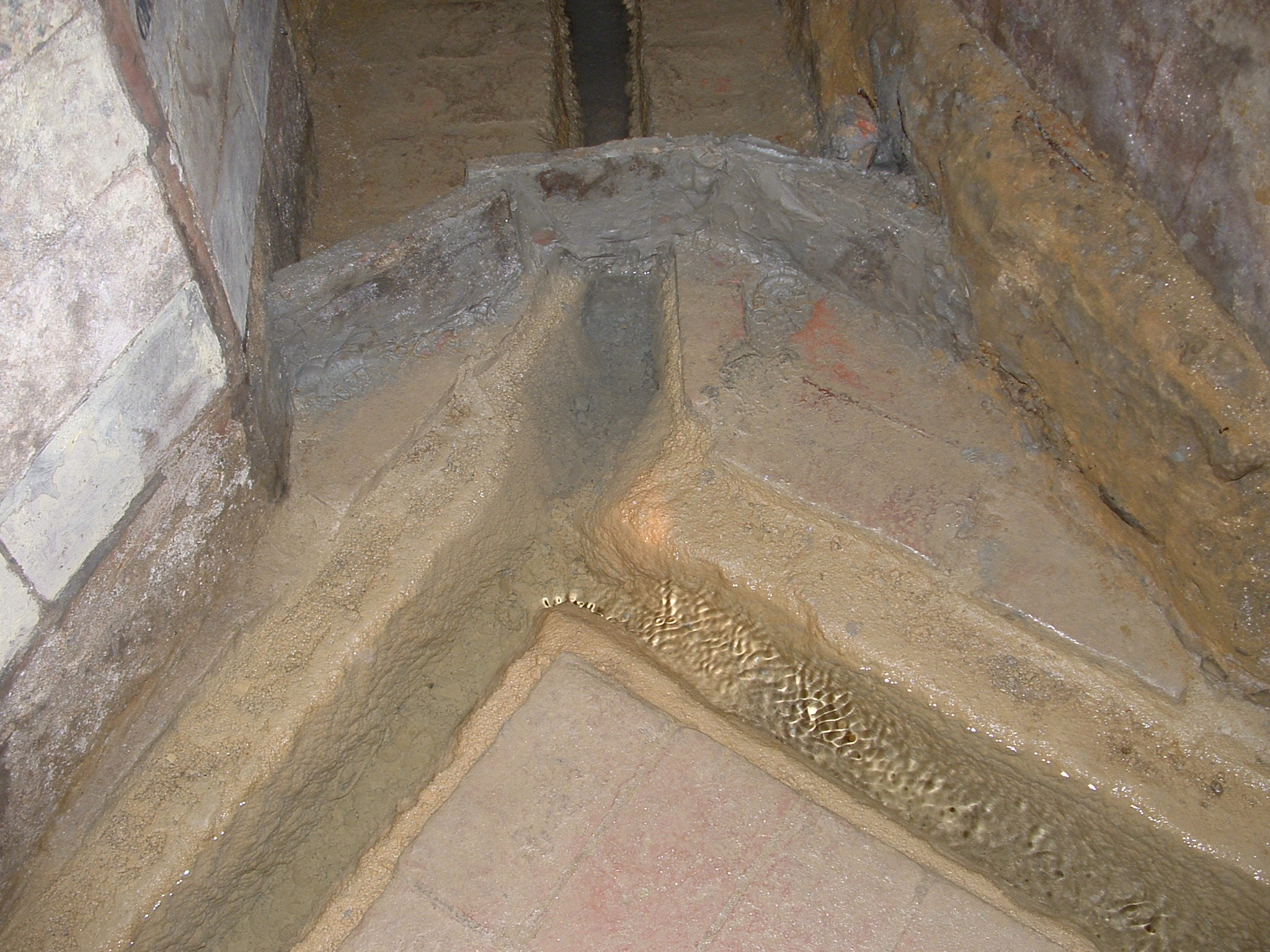
Dado

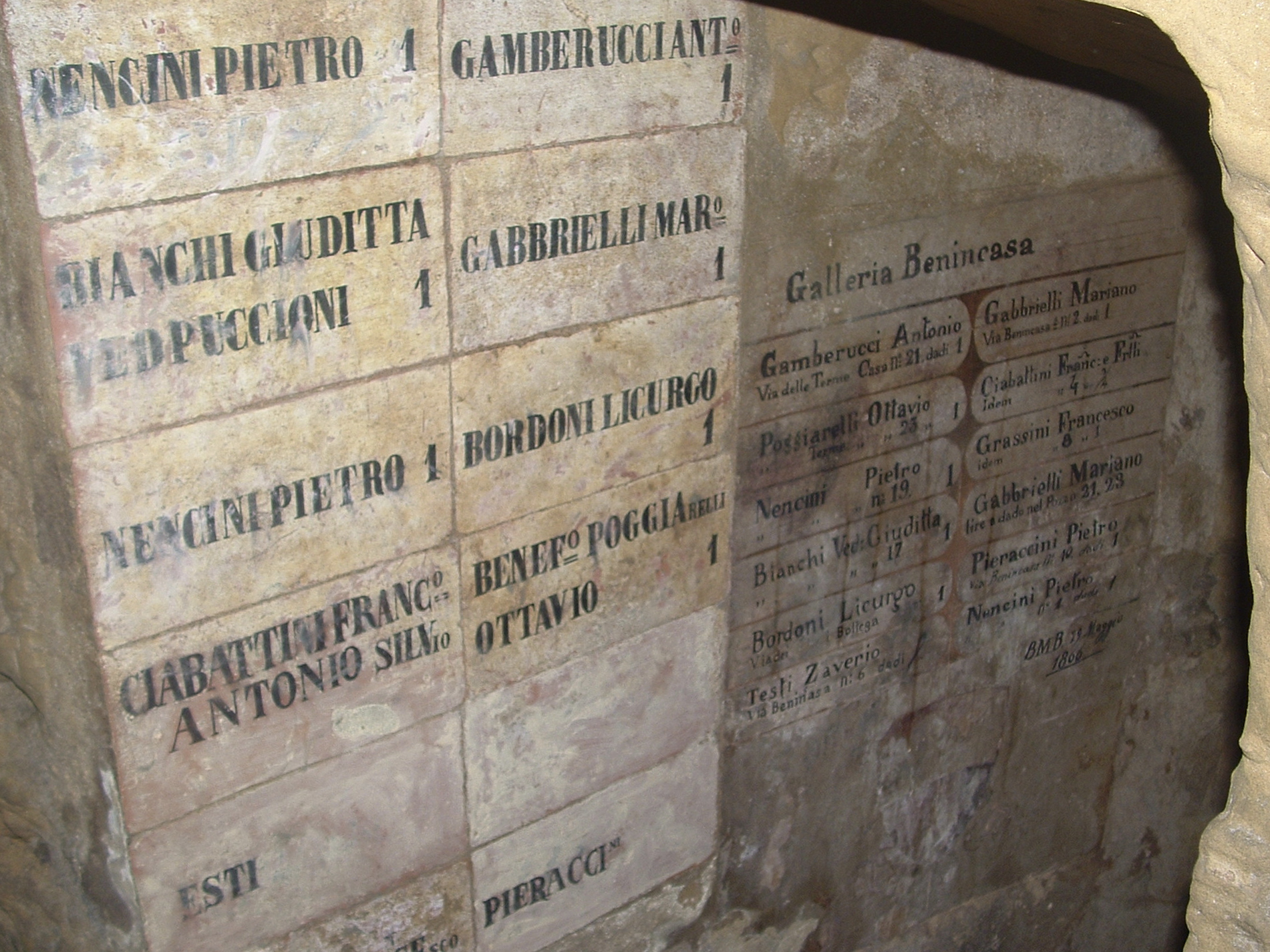
Dado shield for the withdrawal amount of the discharges

In order to finally lead the water to the central Piazza del Campo, the city government accepted on December 16, 1334, Jacopo di Vanni was entrusted with bringing the water from the veins to the north into the city and this, already in 1343, arrived in Piazza del Campo, the center of the life of the city. In 1343 the booty reached Fontebecci and an attempt was made to connect it to the water of the river Staggia, which is the real Quercegrossa. Since 1344, for the most difficult parts of the excavations, were hired professional miners from Massa Marittima and Montieri called Guerchi that received higher wages than the inexperienced workers Sienese. The first stones of Fonte Gaia were laid in April 1343, the fountain was consecrated in 1346 (with the water coming from Fontebecci) and then redesigned from 1409 to 1419 by Jacopo della Quercia. The Ramo di Uopini was completed in 1387. In order to increase the water quality, between 1437 and 1438, under the Prato di Porta Camollia, the Galazzoni were built a system that removes the impurities from the water by decanting it. These basins are 1.6 m (5.2 ft) deep and contain at least 1,400 hectolitres (37,000 US gal). After 1466 no significant changes or extensions were made to the main structure of the Bottini system 1438.

The first private branches to private households emerged from 1474 onwards. In fact, on July 14, 1474, Alessandro di Mariano Sozzini received permission from the city government to build a drain near the Pantaneto fountain to his private residence in Via Pantaneto at his own expense. In September of the same year Pietro Forteguerri also received permission to draw water from the fountain in Via del Casato to his house. Bartolo di Tura also received permission in 1474 to create a private connection. The aim of allowing the creation of private connections was to reduce illegal discharges, the immense extent of which was officially denounced as early as 1446.

=== From the Florentine conquest of Siena to the unification of Italy ===
The air shafts (smiragli) outside the city walls proved to be problematic in times of war. Already in the run-up to the Battle of Camollia (1526) the conspirator Lucio Aringhieri tried to bring troops into the city via the Bottini. In the run-up to the Fiorentine siege (1554–1555), the Bottini began to be walled up in March 1553 so that only water could flow under the barriers.

Schächte (smiragli)

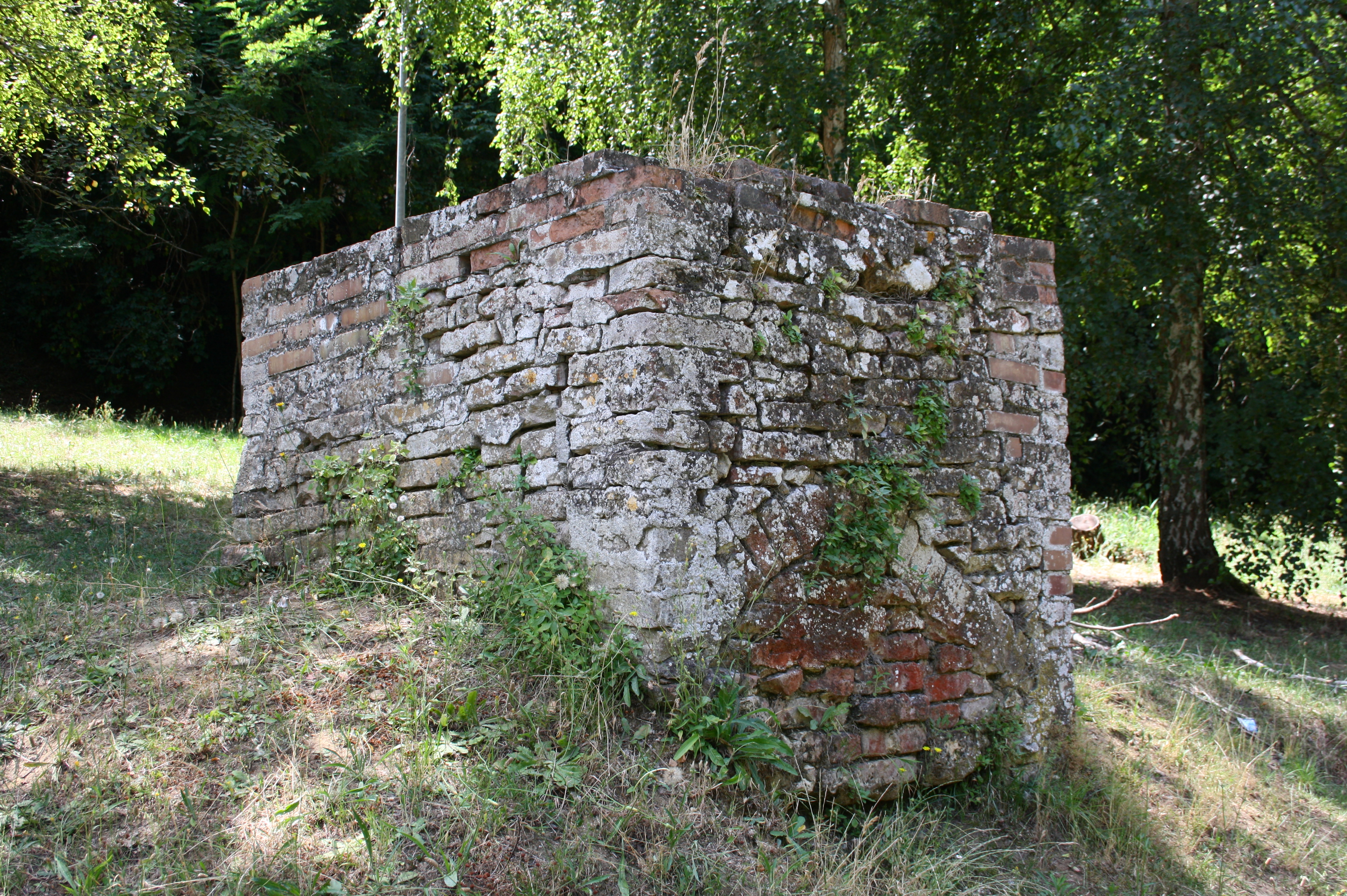
Shaft (smiraglio) near San Benedetto (Acquacalda district), part of the Bottino di Fonte Gaia

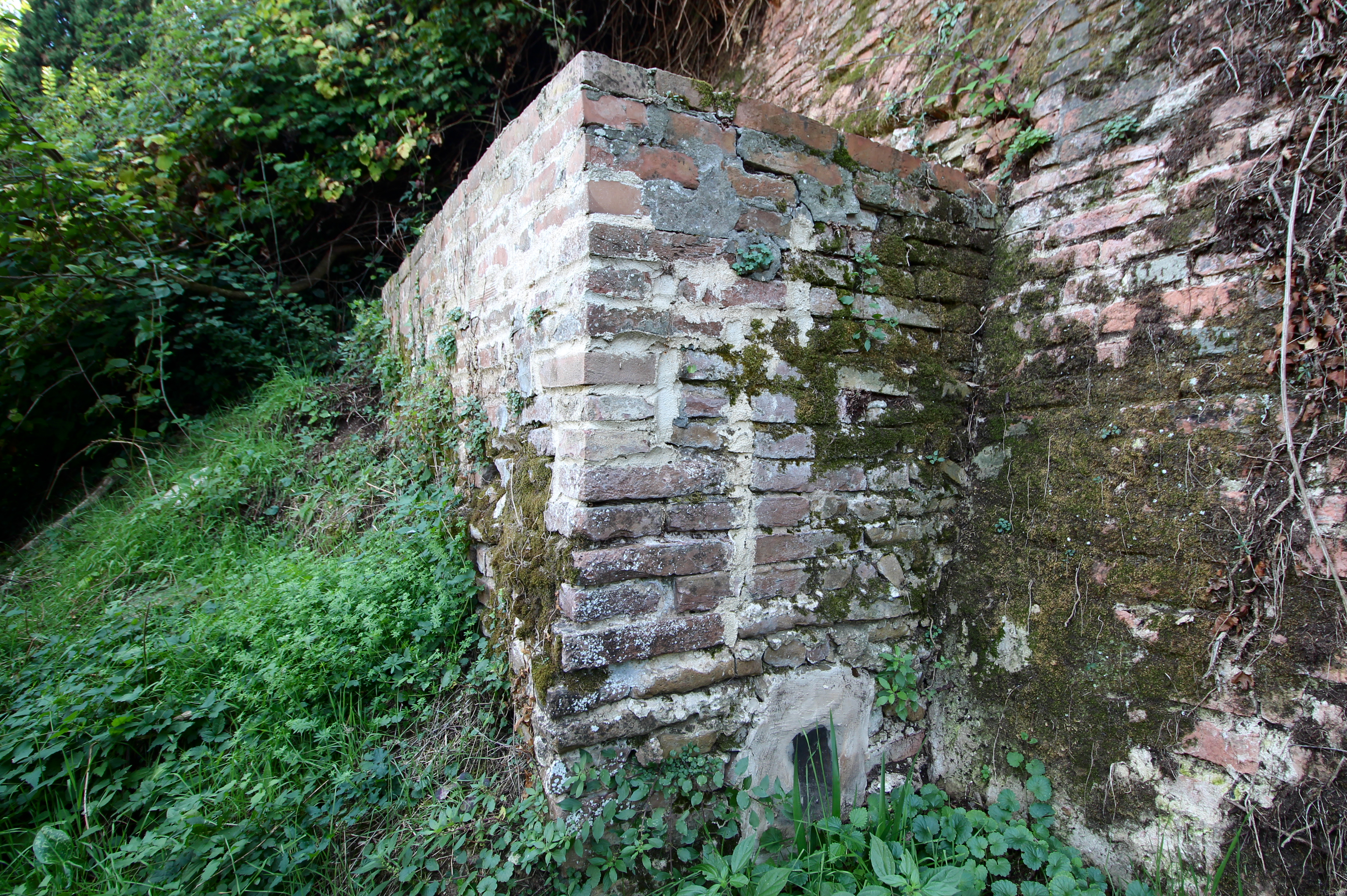
Shaft (smiraglio) of Bottino di Fonte Nuova between Porta Camollia and the Barriera San Lorenzo (Le Lupe) on the outer side of the northern city walls of Siena

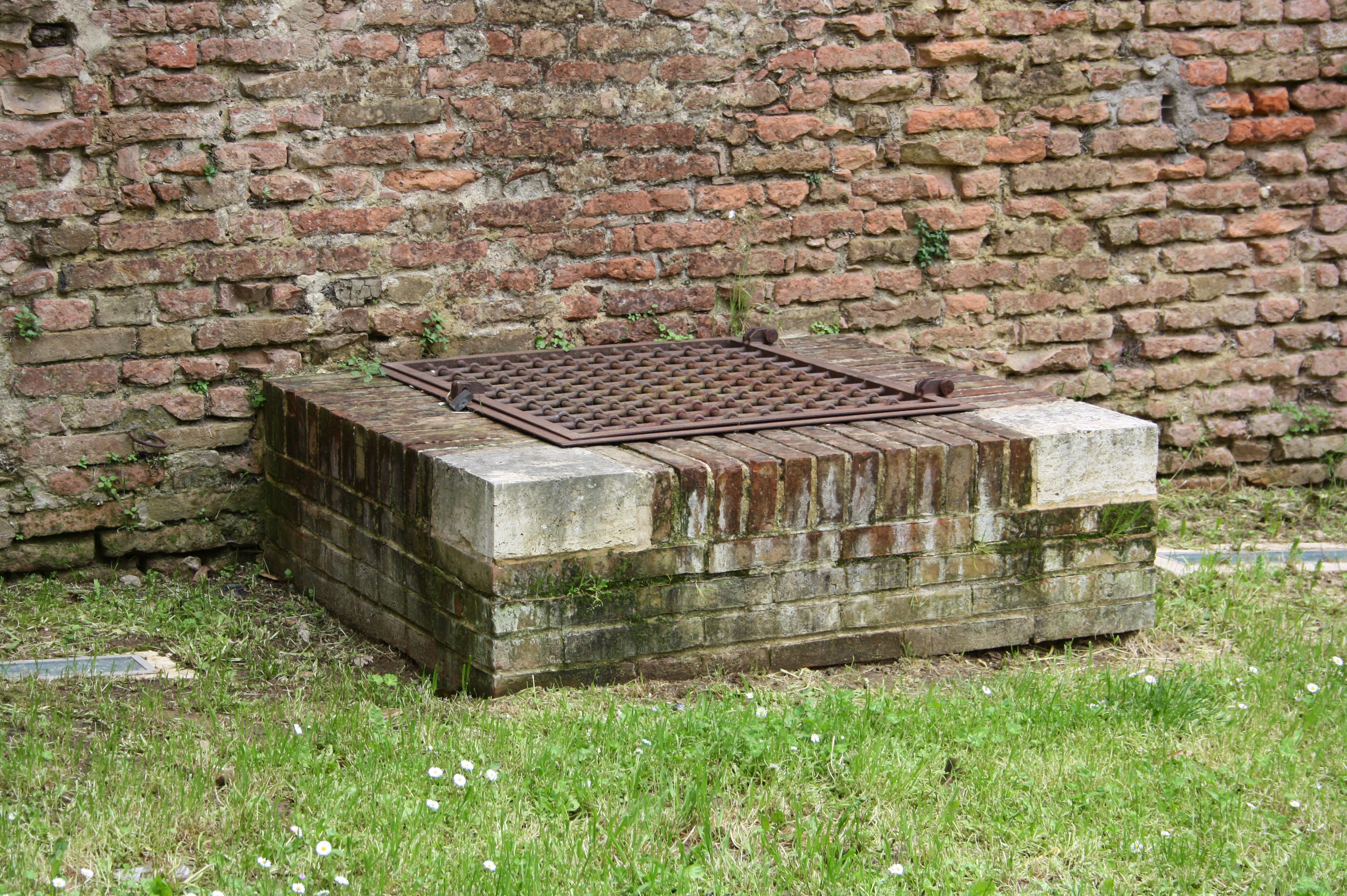
Shaft at the drainage canal after the Fontebranda fountain, below and inside the city wall

Throughout the period from the surrender of Siena in 1555 to the entry into operation of the Vivo aqueduct after the 1st World War, Siena continued to use the spoils as the only source of water supply.

From September 1691, some private individuals demanded and obtained connections to the municipal water supply through wells that collected the water from the gorello: based on how much they paid, they received the relative amount of water, measured by the municipality in "Dadi". The dado, also called forellino, was a small hole in the center of a plate that blocked the junction channel and corresponded to about 400 L (110 US gal) of water in 24 hours. People could have contracts for 1/2 dado, for 1, 2, 3 dadi, and so on.

The oldest planimetric map still in existence dates from 1768 and is now in the Siena State Archives. In July 1825, Giovanni Gani created a connection between the two main canals at an intersection near the Palazzo dei Diavioli. In order to supply water to the almost dry canal of Fontegaia, it was taken with two pumps from the canal of Fontebranda, located twenty meters below. After the waterflow in the Bottino of Fontegaia normalized, the connection was interrupted again in the same year. This system was used in 1835 and 1851 for the same reasons. In order to cope with the water shortage in the Fontegaia Canal, restoration work took place from 1851 to 1868, during which several areas of the canal affected by landslides were cleared. The (modernized) pump approach was resumed in 1870 when Vico Bello installed steam pumps. However, these were already moved in 1873 in the direction of the road to San Domenico; the length of the connecting pipe is 31 m (102 ft). This connection also supplied the area of the Fortezza Santa Barbara fortress and was active until 1931.

=== The end of the Bottini as a water supply system for drinking water ===
At the end of the 19th century, the water supply via the Bottini was no longer considered to be sufficient in quantitative and hygienic terms. From 1885, 18 sources were examined, from 1886 the rivers Arbia, Elsa and Masellone as well as Bozzone (river), Staggia and Tressa were shortlisted, whether or not they corresponded to the water quality for the city supply. Ultimately, in 1895 the choice fell on the Vivo, which flow from the Monte Amiata. From just below the source at Vivo d'Orcia to the city of Siena, an underground aqueduct was built over the municipal areas of Castiglione d'Orcia, Montalcino, San Quirico d'Orcia (near Bagno Vignoni) and Murlo, which is called Acquedotto del Vivo and which today, alongside later supply lines (for example the Ente and Fiora rivers ), which supplies the city of Siena with drinking water. The aqueduct reached Porta San Marco on May 15, 1914, while the inner-city distribution system was completed in 1918.

== Fountains ==
The fountains belonging to the Bottini water system are divided into two categories. The main wells (fonti maggiori) include the wells that have larger water inlets, the secondary wells (fonti minori) include the wells whose water quantity and importance is much lower.

=== Main fountains ===
Name	Coordinate	Height above sea level	Description	Image
Fonte Gaia	Piazza del Campo; 43.318728°N 11.33139°E	321 m (1,053 ft)	Main well, is supplied by the Bottino maestro di Fonte Gaia.	Fonte Gaia
Fontebranda	Via Fontebranda; 43.319355°N 11.327659°E	292 m (958 ft)	Main fountain of the Bottino maestro di Fontebranda, eponymous for the city gate Porta Fontebranda. First mentioned in 1081. Ist fountain of the Contrada dell'Oca.	Fontebranda
Fontebecci	SS 222; 43.343447°N 11.305862°E		It unites the three secondary channels of the Bottino maestro di Fonte Gaia.	Fontebecci
Fonte del Casato	Via del Casato (di Sotto) / Vicolo della Fonte; 43.316613°N 11.331005°E	319 m (1,047 ft)	Also called Fonte Serena. Is supplied by the extension of the Bottino maestro di Fonte Gaia to the Fonte Gaia.	Fonte del Casato
Fonte di Follonica	Tal Valle di Follonica; 43.319358°N 11.337115°E	275 m (902 ft)	First mentioned in 1226.	Fonte di Follonica
Fonte di Fontanella	Via di Fontanella; 43.314874°N 11.332486°E	311 m (1,020 ft)	It is supplied by its own Bottino, which is approx. 300 m long and delivers 0.2 liters per second.	Fonte di Fontanella
Fontenuova	Via Pian d'Ovile / Via Fonte Nuova; 43.323174°N 11.330553°E	304 m (997 ft)	Also called Fonte Nuova or Fonte Nuova d'Ovile. The fountain is located within the city walls near the Porta Ovile and was built between 1303 and 1323. It is supplied by an independent Bottino, which extends 807.50 m to the northwest and leaves the city walls underground. The first 437 m are bricked, the remaining meters lead through dug ground. The Bottino delivers 1.0. It is the fountain of Lupa Contrada.	Fontenuova
Fonte d'Ovile	Via Simone Martini; 43.324017°N 11.334119°E	277 m (909 ft)	The fountain is located outside the Porta Ovile city gate and is fed by its own Bottino, which delivers 1.3 liters per second.	Fonte d'Ovile
Fonte di Pescaia	Strada delle Fonti di Pescaia; 43.325633°N 11.322668°E	304 m (997 ft)	Also called Fonti di Pescaia. The fountain is outside the city walls. Today it houses the Museo dell'Acqua.	Fonte di Pescaia

=== Secondary fountains ===
Name	Coordinate	Height above sea leve	Description	Image
Fontegiusta	Vicolo di Malizia; 43.325341°N 11.326729°E		Today only available as an entrance to the Bottino maestro di Fonte Gaia.	Fontegiusta
Fonte delle Monache	Via delle Sperandie; 43.311259°N 11.328048°E		Also known as Fonte delle Monache di San Paolo and Fonte delle Suore Benedettine di Sant'Agnese. It is supplied by its own Bottino.	Fonte delle Monache
Fonte di Pantaneto	Via Pantaneto; 43.318636°N 11.3339°E		It is supplied by the extension of the Bottino maestro di Fonte Gaia to the Fonte Gaia. Was created in 1452 or 1457 and was redesigned by Serafino Belli in 1807. It is the fountain of the Leocorno Contrada.	Fonte di Pantaneto
Fonte al Pino	Botanischer Garten (Orto botanico); 43.312683°N 11.330288°E	297 m (974 ft)	Also Fonte dell'Orto Botanico, Fonte di Valle Berardi. The fountain is located within the city walls near the Porta Tufi in what is now the botanical garden of the University of Siena and it is supplied by an independent and dug Bottino. It is mentioned for the first time in 1231.	Fonte al Pino
Fonte dei Pispini	Via dei Pispini; 43.31783°N 11.33989°E		Constructed in the 13th century and redesigned in 1534. Is supplied by the extension of the Bottino maestro di Fonte Gaia to the Fonte Gaia. It is the contrada fountain of the Nicchio Contrada.	Fonte dei Pispini
Fonte di Samoreci	Via San Girolamo; 43.316885°N 11.337384°E		Also called Fonte di Ponte di Romana or Fonte di San Maurizio. It is supplied by the extension of the Bottino maestro di Fonte Gaia to the Fonte Gaia and was connected in 1351. It is the fountain of the Montone Contrada.	Fonte di Samoreci
Fonti di San Carlo	Strada di San Carlo; 43.307399°N 11.318065°E		Fountain outside the Porta San Marco. It is supplied by its own Bottino, which delivers 0.8 liters per second.	Fonti di San Carlo
Fonte di San Francesco	Via die Rossi / Via del Comune; 43.321986°N 11.33302°E		It is supplied by a derivative from the Bottino maestro di Fonte Gaia. The name comes from the nearby Basilica di San Francesco, but is also called Fonte di San Bernardino. Contains the statue of Francesco d'Agnolo (called Barbicone) by Angelo Canevari. He is the fountain of the Bruco Contrada.	Fonte di San Francesco
Fonte delle Sperandie	Via del Nuovo Asilo; 43.31349°N 11.325569°E		Fountain outside the city gates of Porta San Marco and Porta Laterina. Was mentioned in 1330.	Fonte delle Sperandie
Fonte dei Tufi	Via di Fontanella; 43.312112°N 11.334083°E (ca.)		Also called Fonte dei Caccialupi, near the Porta Tufi. Located in a grotto and supplied by its own 120 m (390 ft) long Bottino, which is equipped with two 50 m (160 ft) long side arms. It was constructed at the end of the 16th century.	
Fonte della Vetrice	ca. Via del Fosso di Sant'Ansano; 43.316464°N 11.327151°E (ca.)		No longer available, mentioned in 1081.	

== General bibliography ==
- Antonio Maria Baldi: Gli antichi bottini senesi. In: Leonardo Lombardi, Gioacchino Lena, Giulio Pazzagli (Hrsg.): Tecnica di idraulica antica. Geologia dell'Ambiente, Supplemento al numero 4/2006 (Periodico della SIGEA, Società Italiana di Geologia Ambientale), Rom 2006 (Onlineausgabe, PDF)
- Comune di Siena (Hrsg.): I Bottini. Acquedotti medievali senesi. Edizioni Gielle, Siena 1984
- Comune di Siena, Santa Maria della Scala, Associazione La Diana (Hrsg.): A ritrovar la Diana. Protagon Editori, Siena 2001, ISBN 88-8024-074-9
- Duccio Balestracci, Laura Vigni, Armando Constantini: La memoria dell'Acqua. I bottini di Siena. Protagon Editori, Siena 2006
- Acquedotto del Fiora/La Diana (Hrsg.); Benedetto Bargagli Petrucci, Giacomo Luchini, Luca Luchini, Laura Vigni, Giacomo Zanibelli: Acqua per la città. Nel centenario dell'acquedotto del Vivo. Una tormentata avventura senese fra XIX e XX secolo. Tipografia senese, Siena 2014
- Fabio Bargagli Petrucci: Le fonti di Siena e i loro aquedotti, note storiche dalle origini fino al MDLV. Siena 1906 (Onlineausgabe bei archive.org, PDF)
