= Santa Petronilla, Siena =

Church building in Siena, Italy

Coordinates: 43.329486°N 11.321087°E

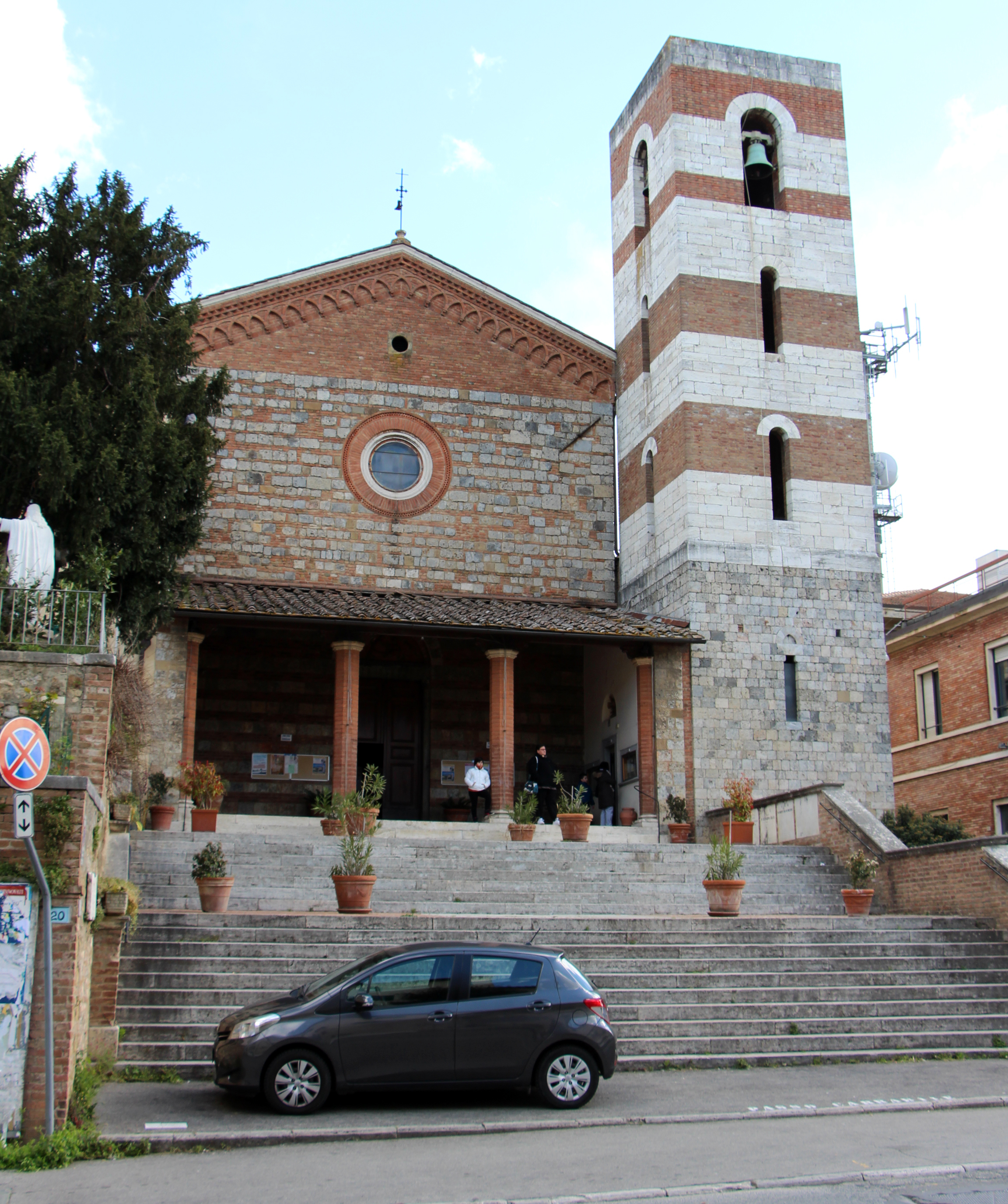
Santa Petronilla, Siena

Santa Petronilla is a 17th-century Roman Catholic church and former convent located near the start of via Camillo Benzo Cavour, corner with via Santa Petronilla 1, in the city of Siena, region of Tuscany, Italy. It is located outside the medieval walls of Siena, near the antiporta of Camollia.

== History ==
A church, convent and hospital stood at the site since the 13th-century, but the convent of Clarissan nuns was destroyed during one of the sieges of Siena during the years 1554–1559. The nuns had relocated into the city to the Convent of the Umiliati; the republic of Siena had converted the convent into a fort before the forces of Cosimo I de Medici destroyed it. The church, dedicated to Saint Petronilla. That small church fell into ruin, and was finally razed in 1895.

Construction of the present church and convent was commissioned in 1622–1632 by the Capuchin Order of monks. Until 1537, the Capuchins owned a convent in Monte Celso near Siena. But because of growth, they sought a new location, and chose one closer to the city. The convent and church they built was dedicated to the Santissima Concezione di Maria (Holiest Conception of Mary).

The Granduke of Tuscany was present at the ceremony to lay the first stone, and a decade later the convent was inaugurated under the guidance of the Archbishop of Siena, Ascanio Piccolomini. The convent, which once housed 100 monks, now is a home for disabled individuals. When the remains of the old church was razed, the title of Santa Petronilla was transferred to the church. The church now belongs to the Archdiocese of Siena, Colle di Val D'Elsa, Montalcino.

The Capuchin convent was briefly suppressed by Napoleonic authorities in 1810, which was renewed in 1866. After this, the convent underwent a number of diverse uses, including as a lazzeretto to quarantine cholera, as barracks, school, orphanage, barracks, and armory.

The neo-Romanesque belltower of the church remained incomplete for centuries, and was only completed only after World War II. Among the bells are some from 1623 and another from 1790. The wide steps that lead to the portal were completed during the 1940s. The remains in a small cemetery and ossuary in front of the church was relocated to the church.

The interior contains a variety of paintings: including a Glory of St Joseph (1629) by Raffaello Vanni; a Martyrdom of St Catherine of Alexandria by a painter of the school of Alessandro Casolani; a Death of the Virgin (1633) by Astolfo Petrazzi, a Martyrdom of St Lawrence by and unknown 17th-century painter; a Deposition of Christ (1704) and an Ecstasy of St Francis of Paola (1722) by Giuseppe Nicola Nasini. The lunettes have Stories of Famous Franciscans (circa 1850) by Vincenzo Dei.

It would be anachronistic to compare the present church facade with that found in a Pinturicchio fresco in the Piccolomini Library of the Cathedral of Siena. The scene of the 15th-century encounter of Frederick III with Eleonora of Portugal supposedly took place near this site, a church adjacent to a city gate resembles the present facade. It is not known if the facade of the raze church resembled the present facade.
