= Bernardo Tolomei =

Italian Roman Catholic saint

Saint Bernardo Tolomei
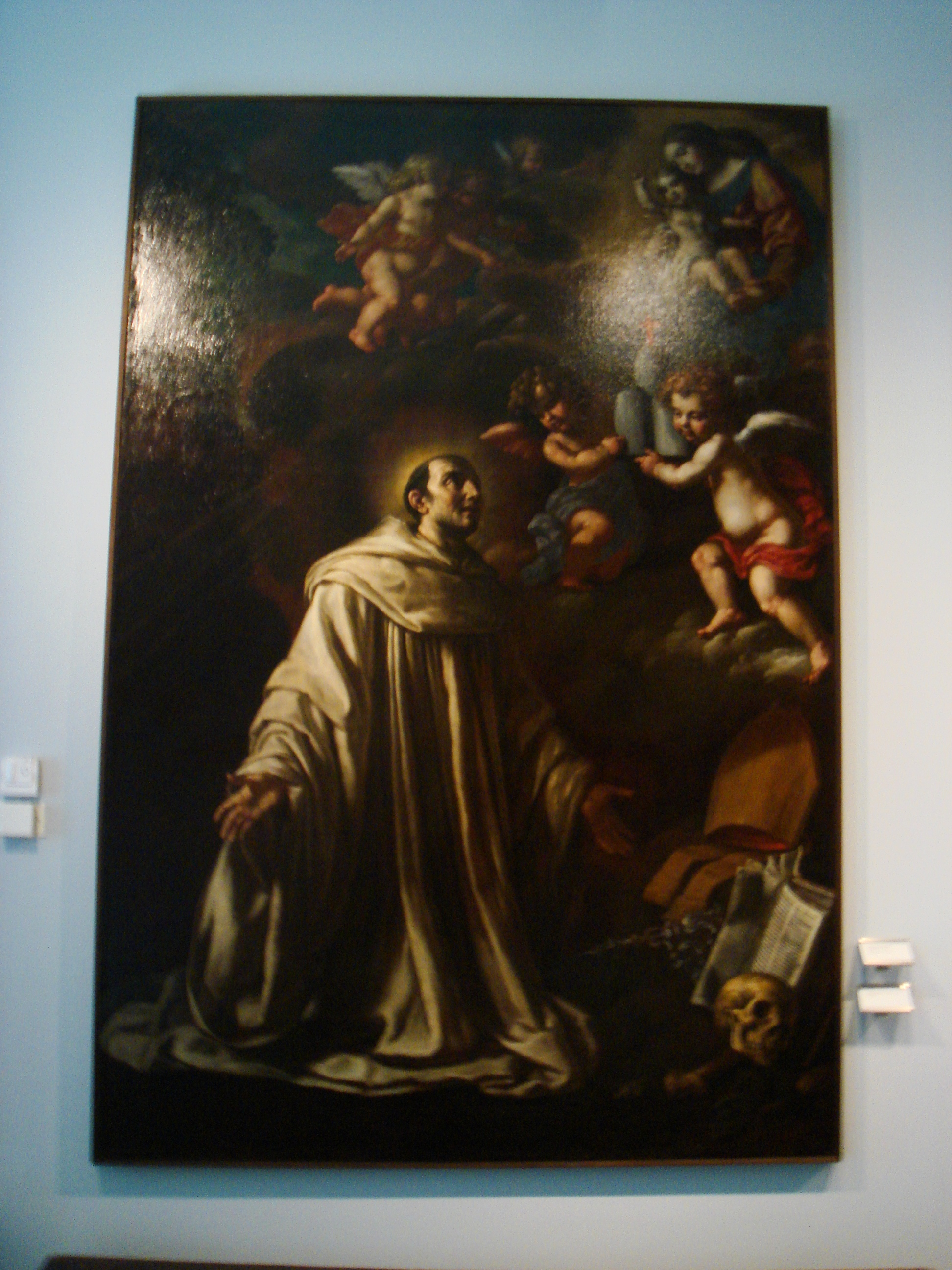
- "Blessed Bernardo Tolomei" - Stefano Bolognini
- Born: 10 May 1272; Siena, Tuscany, Republic of Siena
- Died: 20 August 1348 (aged 76); Siena, Tuscany, Republic of Siena
- Venerated in: Catholic Church
- Beatified: 24 November 1644, Saint Peter's Basilica, Papal States by Pope Innocent X
- Canonized: 26 April 2009, Saint Peter's Square, Vatican City by Pope Benedict XVI
- Feast: 19 August (Benedictines); 20 August
- Attributes: Benedictine habit
- Patronage: Congregation of the Blessed Virgin of Monte Oliveto

Bernardo Tolomei (10 May 1272 – 20 August 1348) was an Italian Catholic priest and the founder of the Congregation of the Blessed Virgin of Monte Oliveto. In the Roman Martyrology he is commemorated on 20 August, but in the Benedictine calendar, his optional memorial is celebrated on the previous day.

Bernardo Tolomei was beatified by Pope Innocent X on 24 November 1644 and was canonized by Pope Benedict XVI on 26 April 2009.

== Life ==
Giovanni Tolomei was born at Siena in Tuscany on 10 May 1272. He was educated by his uncle, Christopher Tolomeo, a Dominican, and desired to enter the religious life, but his father's opposition prevented him from doing so, and he continued his studies in secular surroundings. After studies in philosophy and mathematics, he devoted himself to the study of civil and canon law, and of theology. While studying law in Siena, he joined the Confraternity of the Disciplinati di Santa Maria della Notte, a group dedicated to aiding the sick at the Hospital della Scala. Tolomei became a professor of law at the University of Siena. For a time he served as a knight in the armies of Rudolph I of Germany. After his return to Siena, he was appointed by his fellow citizens to the highest positions in the city government. While thus occupied he was struck with blindness. He is said to have vowed himself to religion in gratitude for the recovery of his eyesight through the intercession of the Blessed Virgin.

In 1313, Tolomei, together with two companions, Patrizio di Francesco Patrizi and Ambrogio di Nino Piccolomini, noble Sienese merchants and members of the same Confraternity, retired to Accona on a property belonging to his family. He had taken the name of "Bernard" (in its Italian form Bernardo) out of admiration for The Cistercian abbot, St. Bernard of Clairvaux. Here they lived a hermitic penitential life characterised by prayer, manual work and silence.

Towards the end of 1318 or the beginning of 1319, while deep in prayer, he is said to have seen a ladder on which monks in white habits ascended, helped by angels, and awaited by Jesus and Mary. Tolomei founded the Congregation of the Blessed Virgin of Monte Oliveto (the Olivetans), giving it the Rule of St. Benedict. The purpose of the new community was a special devotion to the Blessed Virgin. Bishop Guido Tarlati of Arezzo, within whose diocese the congregation was formed, confirmed its constitution in (1319), and many favours were granted by Popes John XXII, Clement VI (1344), and Gregory XI. Since the Benedictine rule did not prescribe the colour of monastic dress, the Olivetans adopted white habits.

Through the generosity of a merchant, a monastery was erected at Siena; Bishop Tarlati built another at Arezzo; a third sprang up at Florence; and within a very few years there were establishments at Camprena, Volterra, San Geminiano, Eugubio, Foligno, and Rome.

During the Plague of 1348, Tolomei left the solitude of Monte Oliveto for the monastery of San Benedetto a Porta Tufi in Siena. The disease was particularly virulent in the city. Tolomei and his monks devoted themselves to the care of the sick. On 20 August 1348, while helping his plague-stricken monks, he himself fell victim to the Plague. Eighty-two monks likewise succumbed to the plague.

His last days were depicted in a painting by the 18th-century Italian painter Giuseppe Maria Crespi in a work was entitled: 'The Blessed Bernard Tolomei Interceding for the Cessation of the Plague in Siena' (1735).

After having ruled the religious body he had founded for 27 years Tolomei died, at the age of 76. Tolomei was canonized in 2009.
