= Fontana di Pantaneto =

Fountain in Siena, Italy

Coordinates: 43°19′07.03″N 11°20′02.03″E

La Fontana di Pantaneto, now known as the Fontana del Leocorno is a public monumental fountain located on Via Pantaneto in Siena, region of Tuscany, Italy. The fountain is located across from Via Pantaneto #19.

== History ==
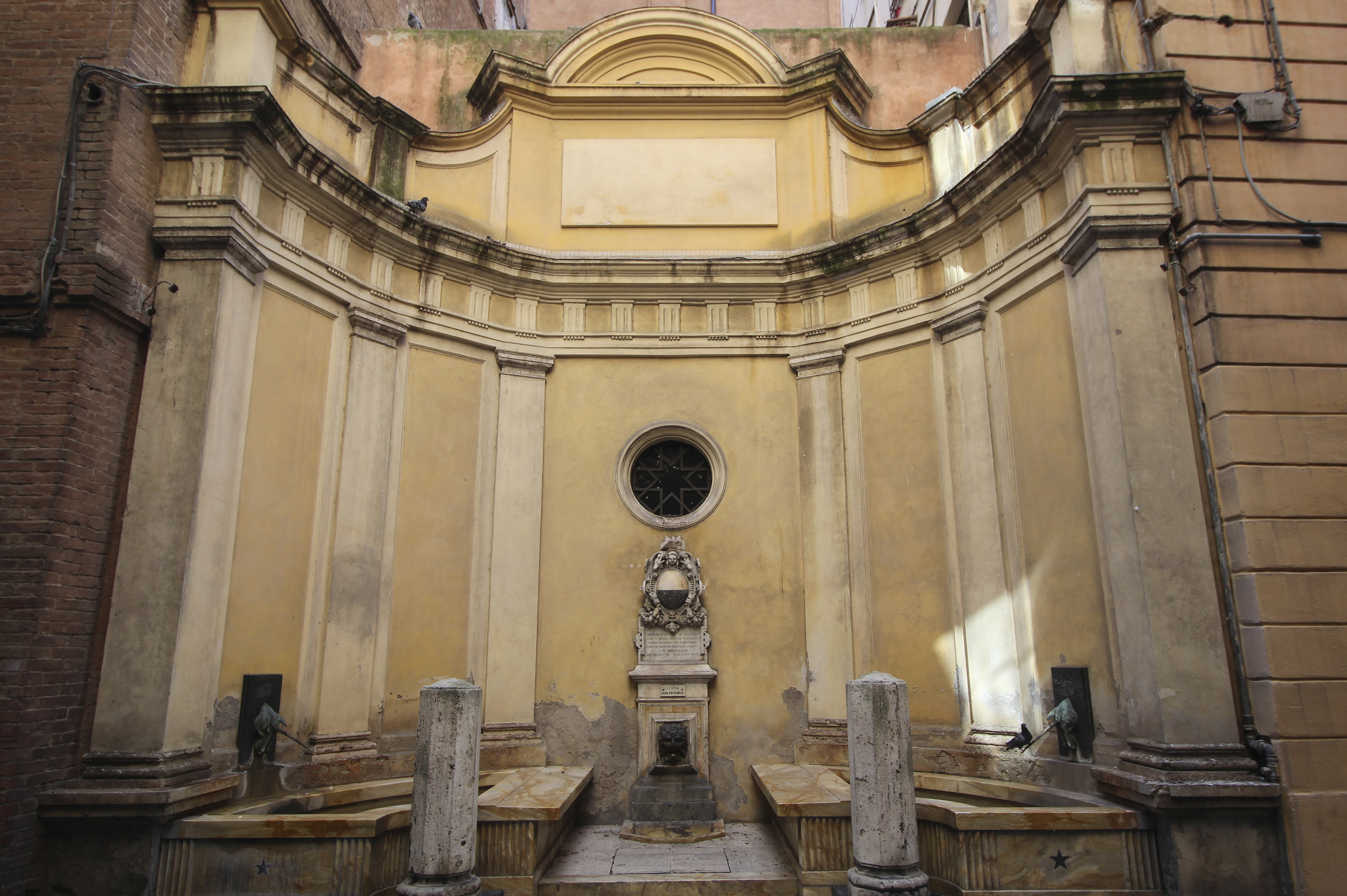
Fountain Fonte di Pantaneto, Siena

The fountain is part of the Bottini of Siena water system, medieval underground aqueducts. It is supplied by the extension of the Bottino maestro di Fonte Gaia to the Fonte Gaia. It is the fountain of the Leocorno Contrada.

The first fountain at the site was built in 1452 or 1457 using funds from the Comune of the city. The first fountain was merely an unceremonious niche in the wall with a basin. In the niche a sculpted head of an old lady, called the vecchia di Pantaneto was placed.

In 1807, the aristocrat Vinceslao Malavolti, after refurbishing his nearby Palazzo Sozzini, commissioned the architect Agostino Belli to embellish the fountain. Agostino drew up a Neoclassic-style project with doric columns, central basin and a statuary group with Neptune surrounded by four tritons. The sculpture was completed by Antonio Zini. The staining and leaching of the marble led to degradation of this pompous tableaux, and by 1866, a new fountain was commissioned from the engineer Girolamo Tarducci. The engineer dismissed artistry, and reformulated the fountain as a basic functional public water source.

In 1997, the Contrada del Leocorno reconstructed the fountain under the designs of Carlo Nepi as two basins fed from the horns of two modern bronze unicorn (leocorno) heads, cast by the sculptor Francesco Carone. While in the center of the niche, surrounded by doric columns, is a round window, and below a plaque with the shield of Siena, are an announcement of the 1866 reconstruction. Below a droll mask also can provide water. The fountain's location in a narrow alley and the non-potable nature of the water detracts from the potential for either scenography or amenity. The eclectic ensemble with formal elements and marble basins but also with playful decoration, seems as confused as the history of its formulations. It main dignity is found in intimacy, a short caesura on a street that leads to the Loggia del Papa, which like this architectural structure, seems at loss for purpose, but unlike the present fountain, is not adrift in artistic style.

== See also ==
- Fountain of San Maurizio
