= Fountain of San Maurizio, Siena =

Fountain in Italy

Coordinates: 43°19′00.09″N 11°20′15.02″E

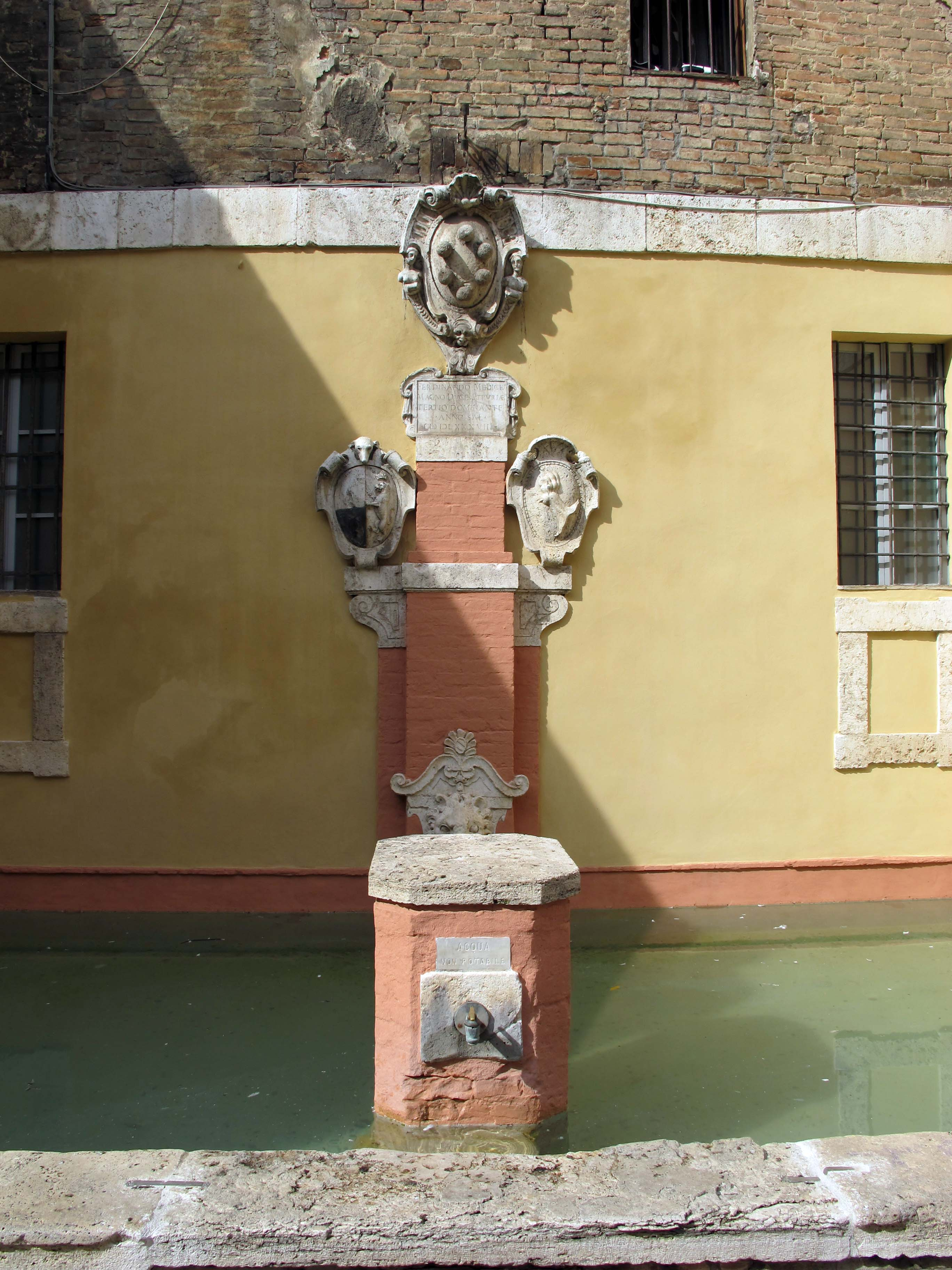
Fontana di Samoreci

The Fountain of San Maurizio, also called Fonte di Samoreci or Fonte di Ponte di Romana, is a medieval public fountain located at the intersection of Via di Pantaneto and Via San Girolamo in Siena, region of Tuscany, Italy. It is located just outside one set of medieval city walls and the Arco di San Maurizio.

== History ==
Siena is a city without nearby rivers, and throughout its history it was highly dependent on aqueducts and urban water sources for the water supply. The fountain is part of the Bottini of Siena water system, medieval underground aqueducts. It is supplied by the extension of the Bottino maestro di Fonte Gaia to the Fonte Gaia and was connected in 1351. It is the fountain of the Montone Contrada.

Unlike other fountains in the city, it has no cover. A fountain at the site is documented since 1293, prior to this it was a simple cistern. In 1351, the Biccherna funded construction of the fountain which was only completed in 1452. It has been reconstructed across the ages. The center has a coat of arms (1583) of the Medici.

== See also ==
- Fontana di Pantaneto
