= Palazzo Turchi =

Castle-like structure

Coordinates: 43.3323°N 11.3121°E

The Palazzo Turchi, also called the Palazzo dei Diavoli, is a castle-like structure located outside the city wall of Siena, near Porta Camollia between Viale Cavour e via Fiorentina.

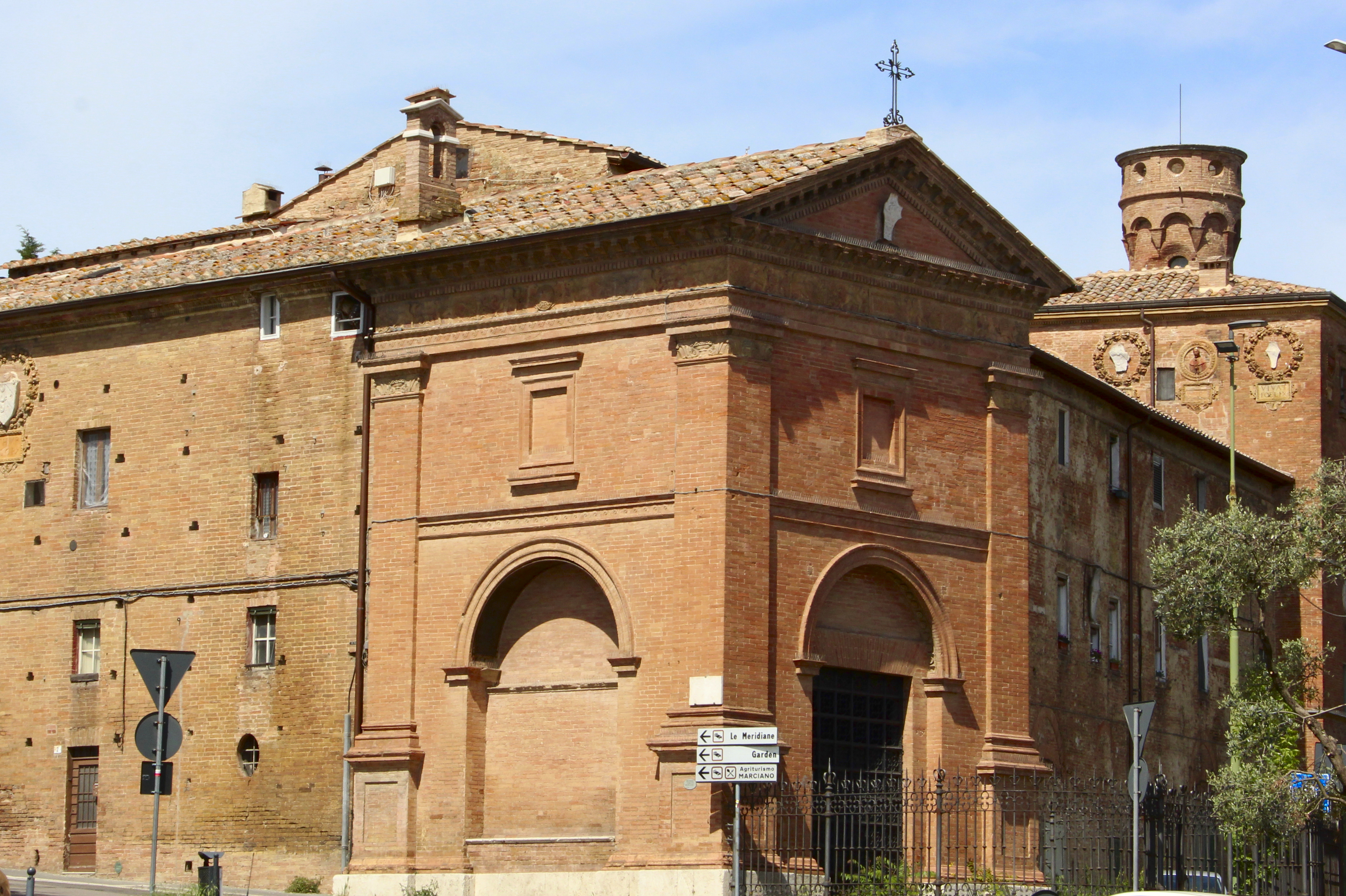
View of Palazzo Turchi (dei Diavoli)

== History ==
The site of this brick fortress house was the site where a combined Florentine and Papal army of Clement VII was defeated by the Sienese in 1526. The tall tower is the element remaining from medieval construction by the Turchi family, perhaps with architect Cecco di Giorgio. The name of Palace of the Devil is quaintly attributed by guides to Siena for a variety of possible reasons. Some claim the site was used for devil worship, others claim only with the help of the Devil could the Sienese triumph over Papal-blessed armies. The present structure owes much to 19th-century reconstructions.
