= Oratorio del Santo Sepolcro, Siena =

Chapel in Siena, Italy

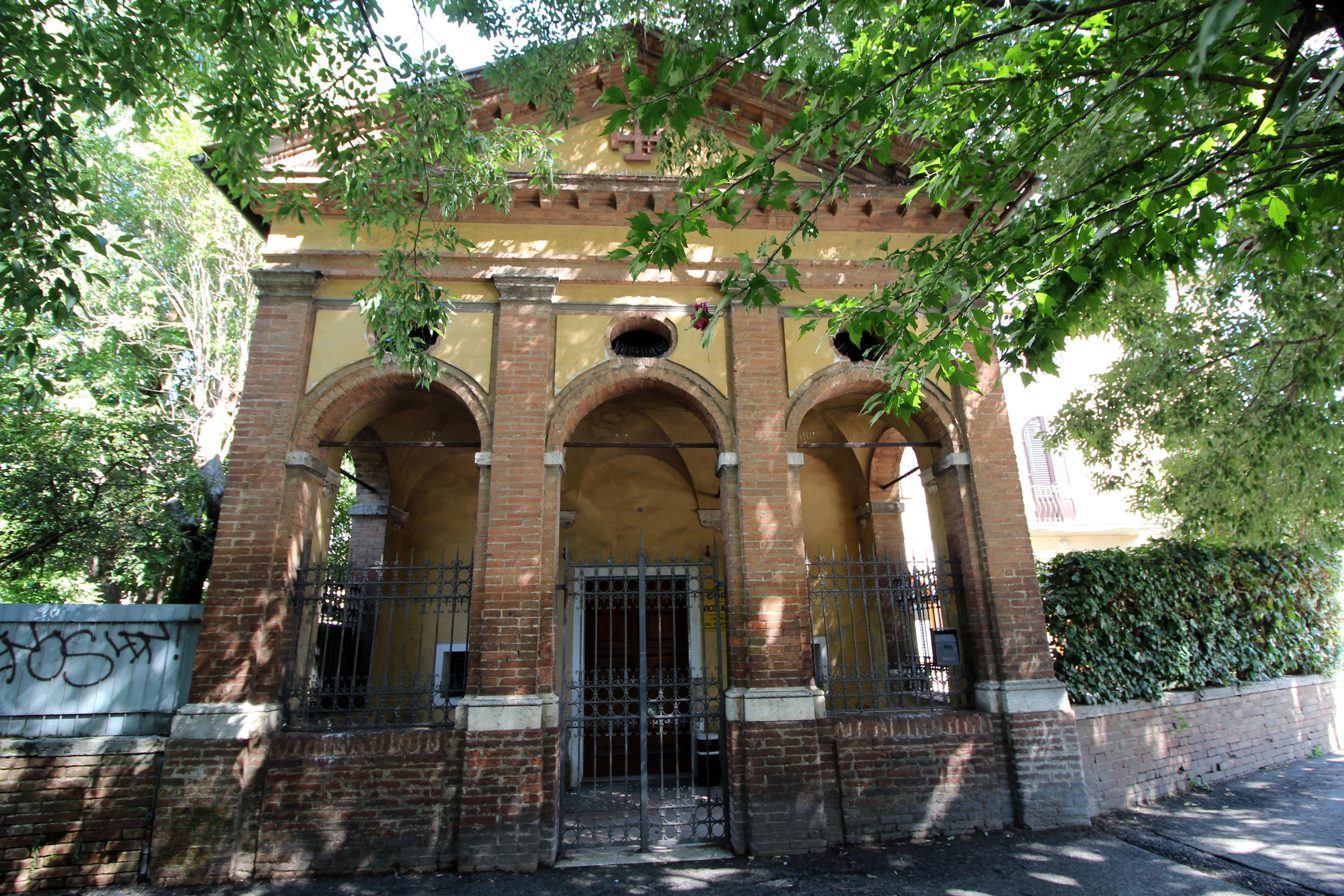
Exterior of the Oratory del Santo Sepolcro

The Oratory del Santo Sepolcro is a renaissance-style chapel or small church located at the beginning of Viale Vittorio Emanuele, just across from Porta Camollia in the city of Siena, region of Tuscany, Italy.

The small chapel with a portico of three arches, with oculi above, was erected in 1603 by Francesco Vanni. He had painted an altarpiece depicting a Dead Jesus. The oratory served a confraternity allied to the once adjacent Ospedale di Santa Croce in Jerusalem, founded likely in 1368.
