= Porta San Marco, Siena =

Coordinates: 43.311939°N 11.32525°E

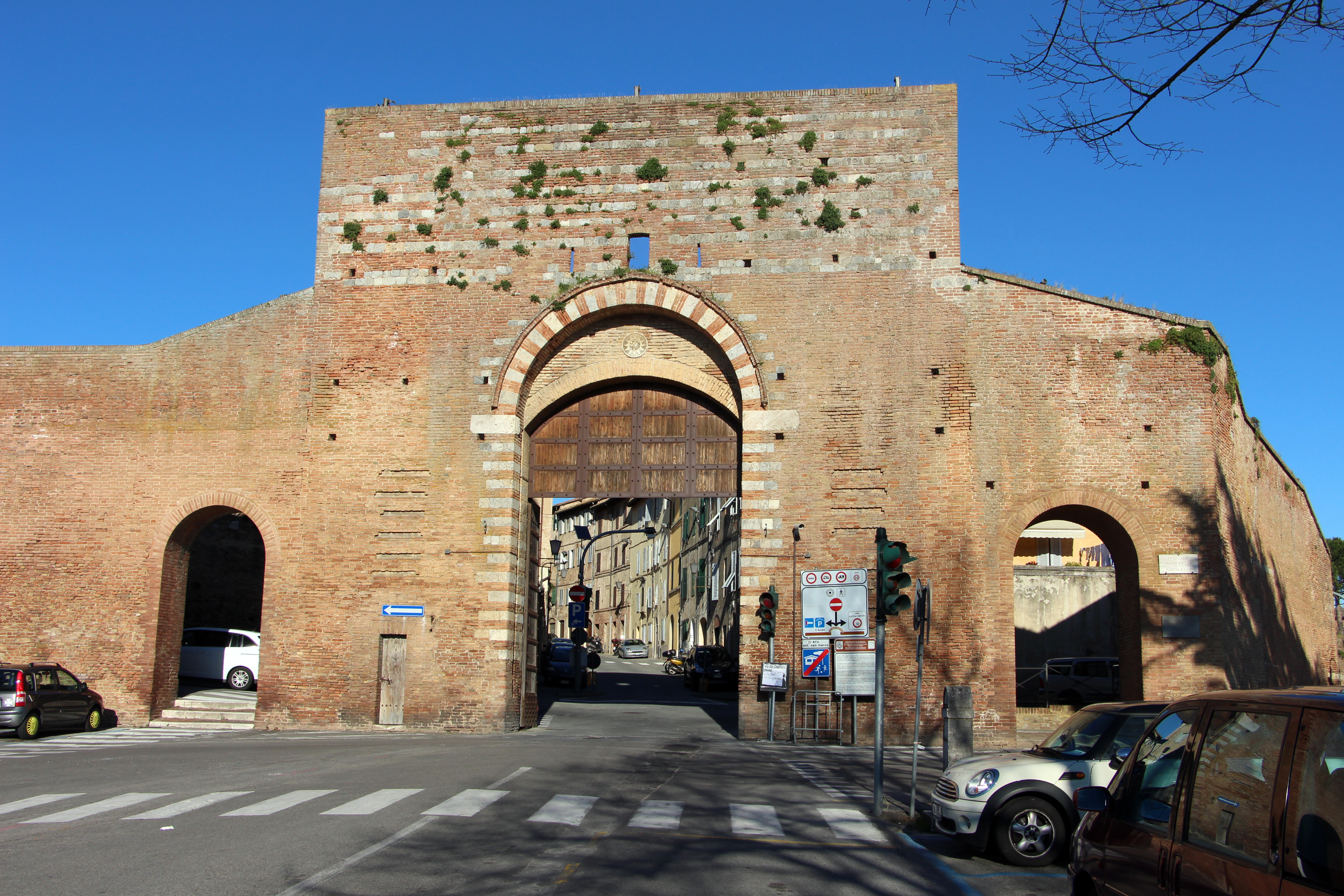
Exterior view of Gate

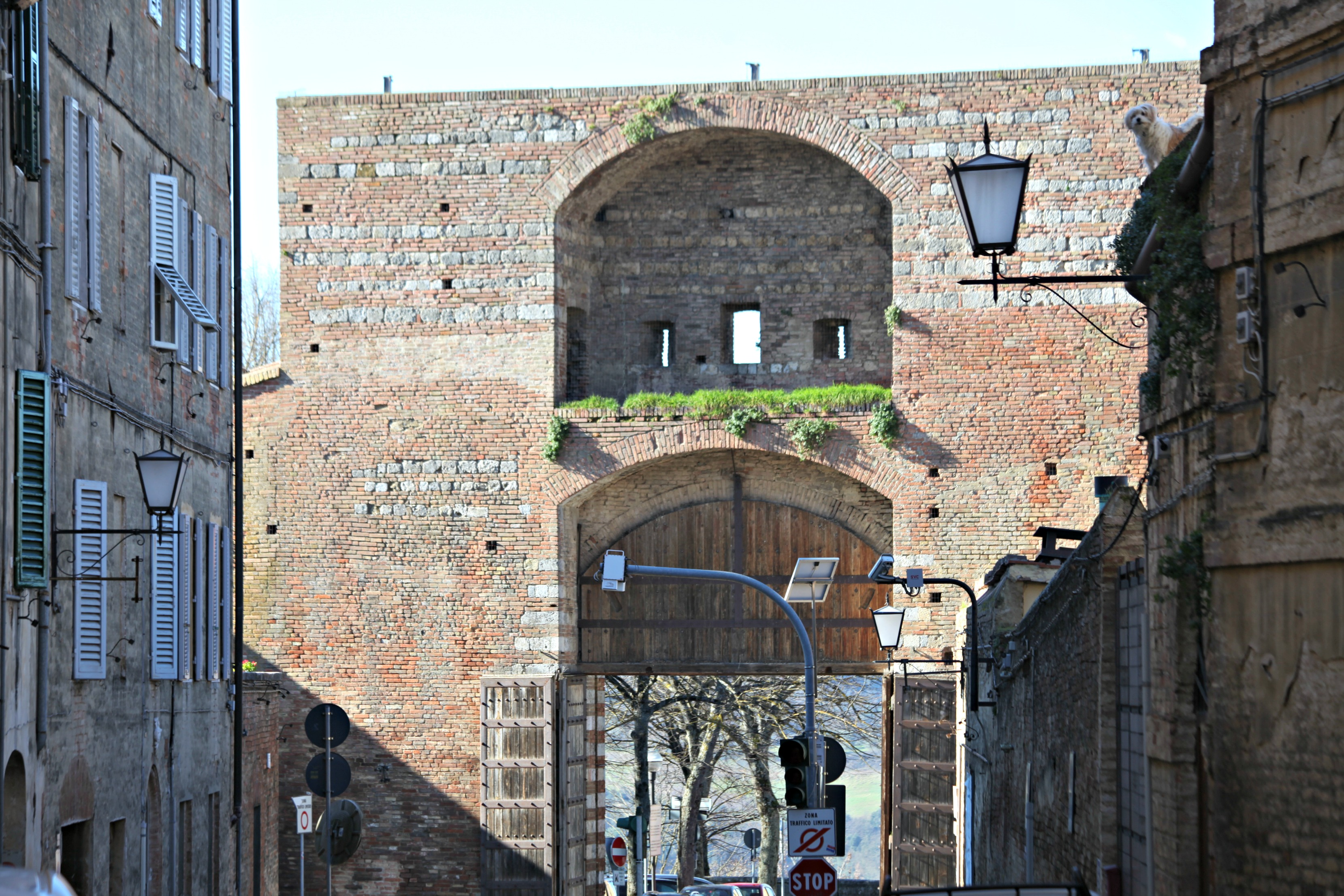
Internal view of Gate

Porta San Marco is a remaining gate in the medieval walls of Siena. It is found at the start of Via San Marco.

== History ==
Formerly known as the Porta delle Maremme, this two story gate was first built around 1325-1326, about the time the Porta Tufi was built. It was refurbished in the 16th century by Baldassarre Peruzzi. The gatehouses and antiporti were demolished in the 19th century. The former Oratory of San Marco found near the gate is also no longer present. Above the external archway is a round christogram of St Bernardino of Siena.

== Bibliography ==
- Toscana. Guida d'Italia (Guida rossa), Touring Club Italiano, Milano 2003. ISBN 88-365-2767-1
- Scoprire Siena, portale web gestito dall'Associazione Culturale "Il Veliero delle Arti", http://www.scopriresiena.it/porta-san-marco/
- Derived from the Italian Wikipedia entry.
