= Porta di Fontebranda, Siena =

Coordinates: 43°19′06.79″N 11°19′34.09″E

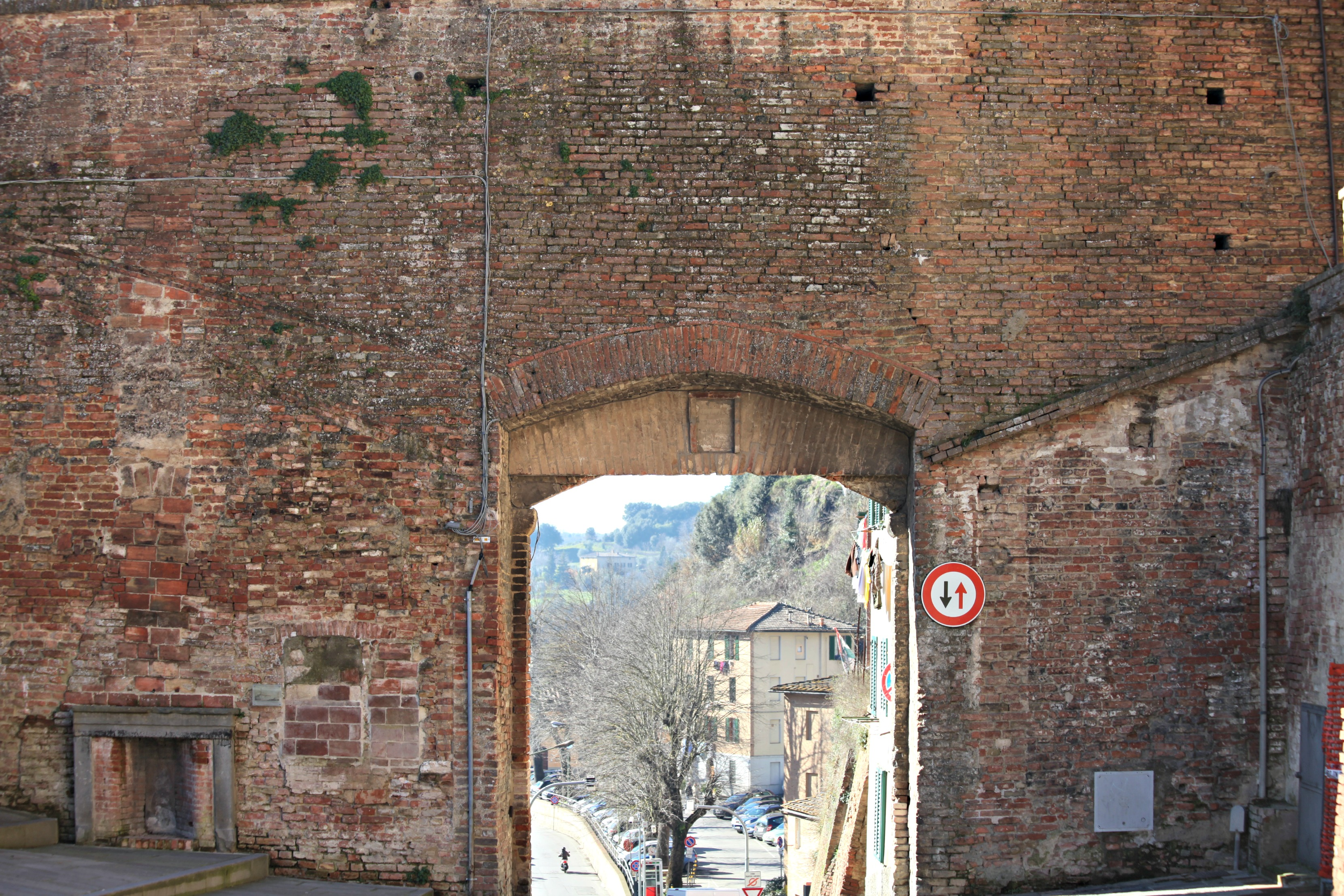
Porta di Fontebranda

The Porta di Fontebranda or Fontebranda Gate is one of the last remaining gates in the medieval walls of Siena. It is located on via di Fontebranda, in Siena, region of Tuscany, Italy.

== History ==
The brick and stone gate was built into the new walls in 1255, and originally also had an outside antiporta, no longer extant. It was one of the main western entrances to the city. It stands near Fontebranda, one of Siena's medieval fountains.
