= Vivo d'Orcia =

- Frazione
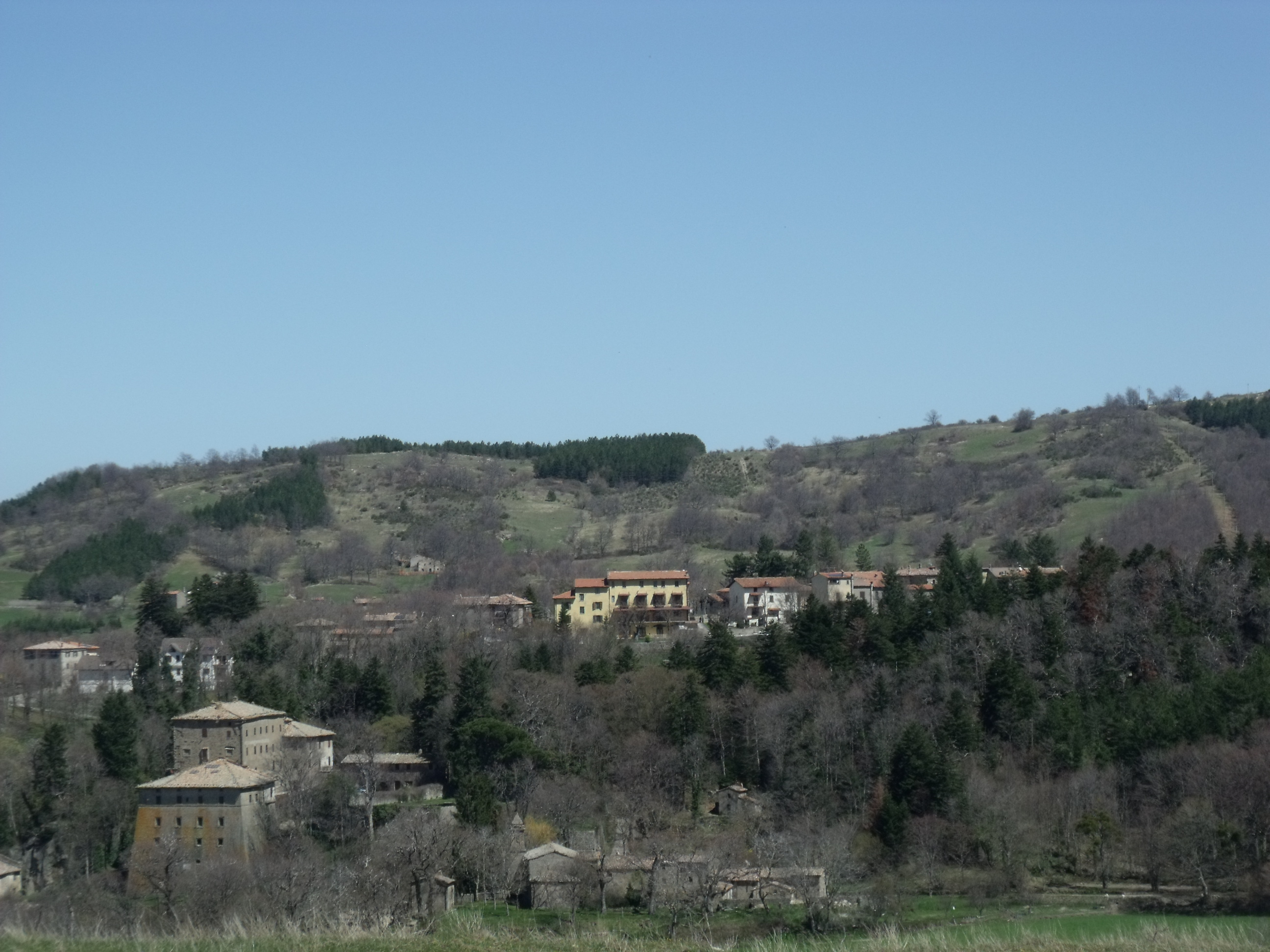

- Location of Vivo d'Orcia in Italy
- Coordinates: 42°56′2″N 11°38′17″E
- Country: Italy
- Region: Tuscany
- Province: Siena (SI)
- Comune: Castiglione d'Orcia
- Elevation: 870 m (2,850 ft)

Population (2011)
  - Total: 532
- Demonym: Vivaioli
- Time zone: UTC+1 (CET)
  - Summer (DST): UTC+2 (CEST)

Vivo d'Orcia is a village in Tuscany, central Italy, administratively a frazione of the comune of Castiglione d'Orcia, province of Siena. At the time of the 2001 census its population was 610.

Vivo d'Orcia is about 68 km from Siena and 13 km from Castiglione d'Orcia.
