= Fontebranda, Siena =

Fountain in Siena

Coordinates: 43.319167°N 11.327638°E

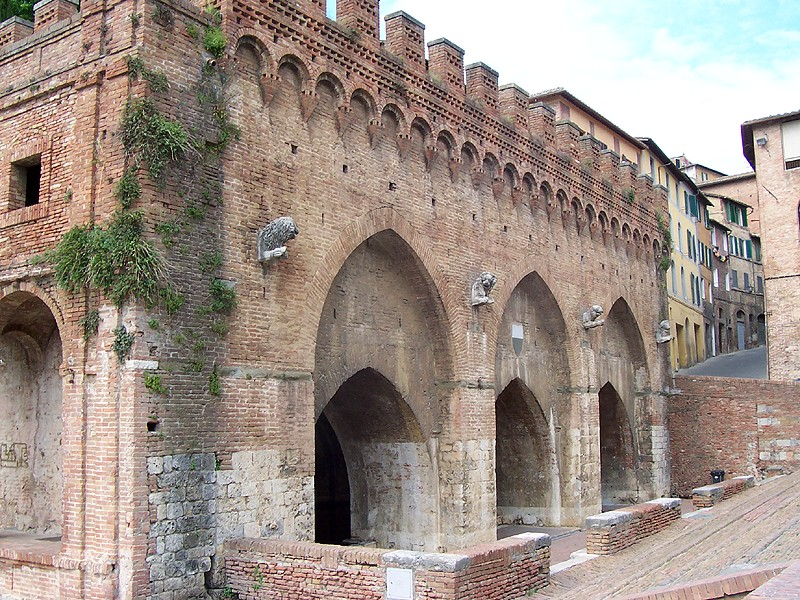
Fontebranda

Fontebranda is one of the medieval fountains of Siena, located in Terzo di Camollia, in the Contrada of Oca, near the Porta of Fontebranda.

== History ==
The fountain was built in the 13th century by the Guild of the Wool-makers (Lana). The first mention of a fountain was in 1081, and documents speak of enlargement by Bellamino in 1193, and finally rebuilt in its present form in 1246. The fountain is cited by Dante Alighieri in the "Divine Comedy" (Inferno - Canto trentesimo/XXXth, vv. 76-78).

== Structure ==
The fountain front has three Gothic arches and a crenellated roof. The roof spans a tank fed by water traveling for kilometers to reach the city. The structure was so large, due to multiple use: to get drinking water for men and, separately, for animals, and to wash clothes, especially the textiles made by Arte della Lana (Guild of Wool-makers).

== Bibliography ==
Toscana, Guida d'Italia (Guida rossa), Touring Club Italiano, Milano, 2003 (ISBN 88-365-2767-1).
