= Porta Camollia, Siena =

Coordinates: 43.32766°N 11.325385°E

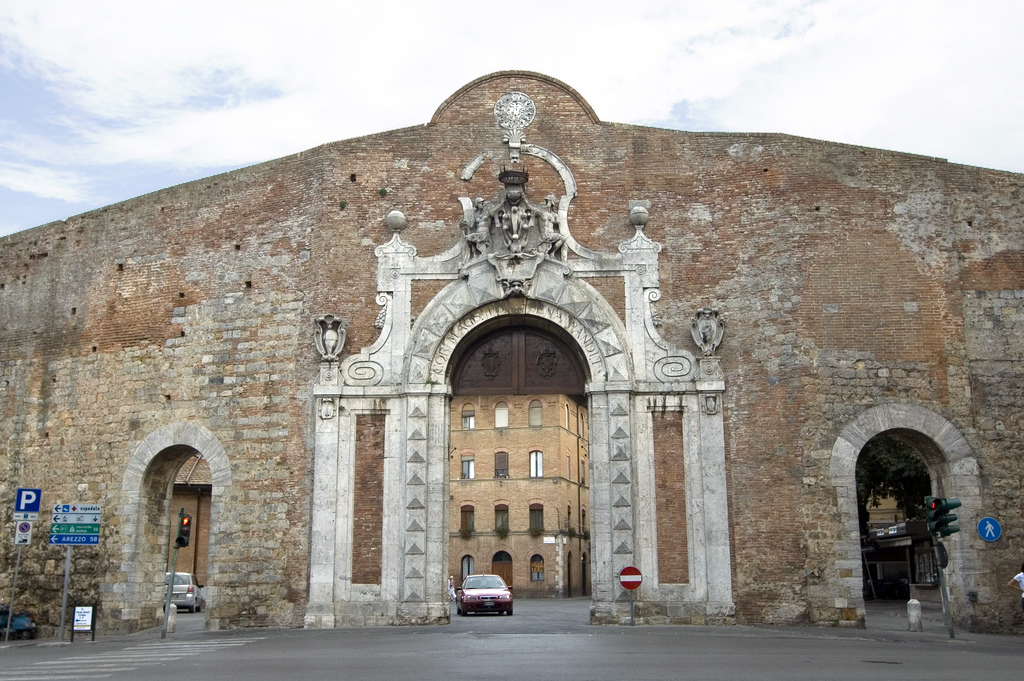
Porta Camollia

Porta Camollìa is one of the northern portals in the medieval walls of Siena. It is located on via Camollia and opens inside the city into the Contrada of Istrice.

Consisting of three arches; the inner arch is surmounted by a circular marble bas-relief with the Roman Catholic IHS Christogram inside a sun symbol (San Bernardino Christogram). The outer facade has the Medici heraldic shield with a stone arch added in 1604 by Alessandro Casolani and decorated by Domenico Cafaggi. The inscription was placed to record the entry of Ferdinand I de' Medici into Siena, and states Cor magis tibi sena pandit (Siena shows a heart that is bigger than this gate). The two central figures hold the Medici coat of arms.

== History ==
The name comes from the legend regarding the founding of Siena, that a soldier by the name of Camulio had been sent to Siena by the founder of Rome, Romulus, to capture his nephews Senio and Ascanio. However, Camulio instead stayed and built a town around the area of the portal. Over the centuries, this gate, which lead towards Florence was often the most defended. The original gate, built during the 13th century was razed during the 1555 siege of Siena. About forty meters outside of the gate, at the start of via Vittorio Emanuele II is the small renaissance-style Oratorio del Santo Sepolcro. A few hundred meters north along the same street rises the Antiporto di Camollia, an additional fortification built to defend this access to the Via Francigena.

== Bibliography ==
- Toscana, Umbria, Marche Guida d'Italia (Guida rossa), Touring Club Italiano, Milano 2002.
