= Porta Tufi, Siena =

Coordinates: 43.311705°N 11.332932°E

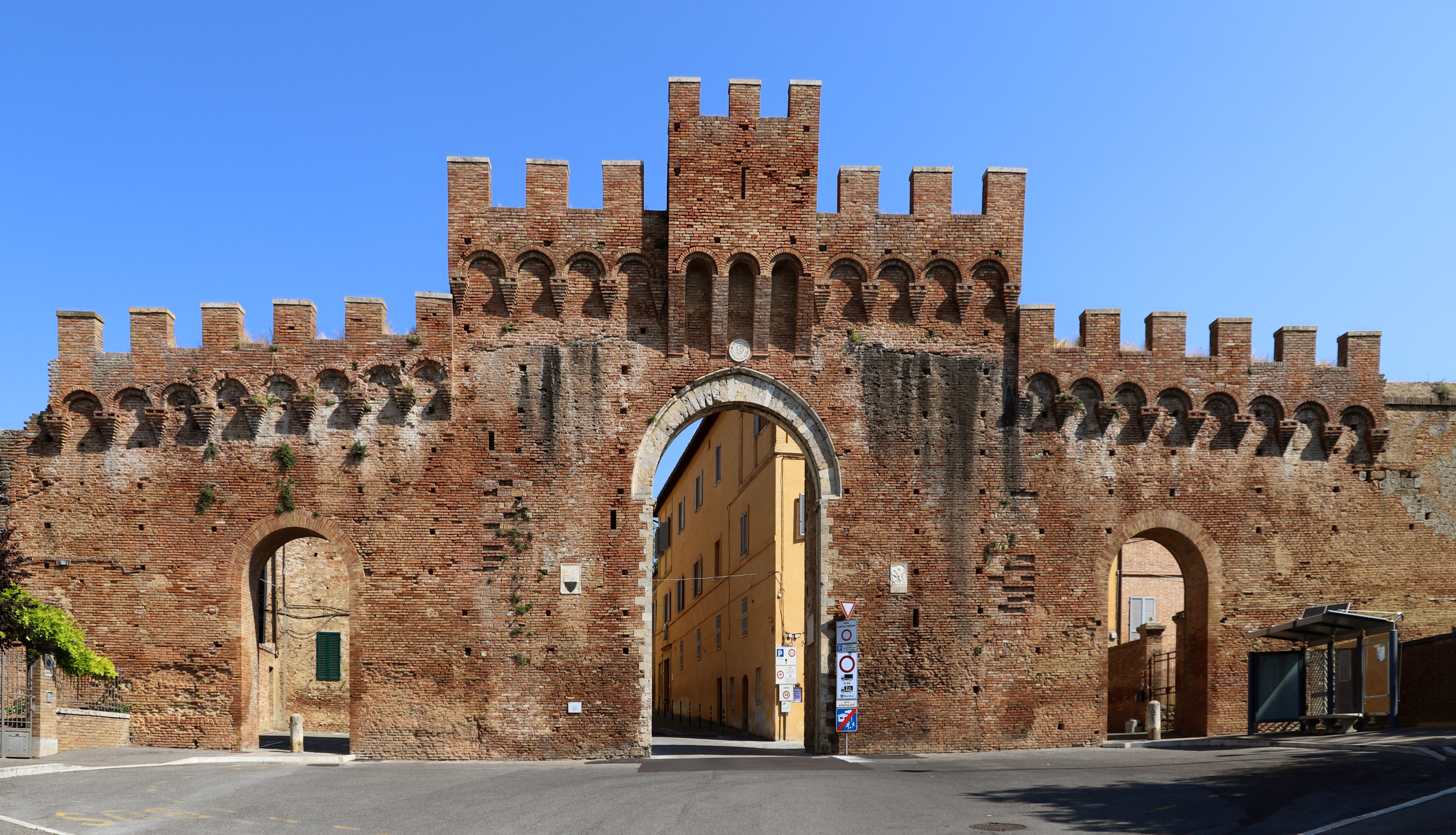
Porta Tufi

The Porta Tufi or Tufi Gate is one of the remaining portals in the medieval Walls of Siena. It is located on Strada di Tufi, now Via Pier Andrea Mattioli, in Siena, region of Tuscany, Italy. It stands on a peninsula of walls near Sant'Agostino, opening to a road leading south of the city.

== History ==
The gate, built mostly of brick, was built in 1325-1326 during the erection of the outermost of the medieval walls. The design is attributed to Agnolo di Ventura. The portal has three rounded arches, with a larger central travertine marble arch. The flanking guardhouses have crenellated roofs. The external central arch is surmounted by a round marble relief of the Roman Catholic IHS Christogram symbol of St Bernardino of Siena. The interior wall has an icon of the Madonna. On the corner of nearby buildings plaques announce entry into the Contrada of Tartuca. A recently added plaque inside the gate recalls that through this portal, in July 1552, Enea Piccolomini and Giovanni Benedetti entered with a small army to aid a Sienese rebellion against the Spanish-Florentine rule, that ended only a few years later with the Battle of Marciano.

== Bibliography ==
- Toscana. Guida d'Italia (Guida rossa), Touring Club Italiano, Milano 2003. ISBN 88-365-2767-1
