= Fonte Gaia =

Monumental fountain in Siena, Italy

Coordinates: 43°19′07″N 11°19′53″E

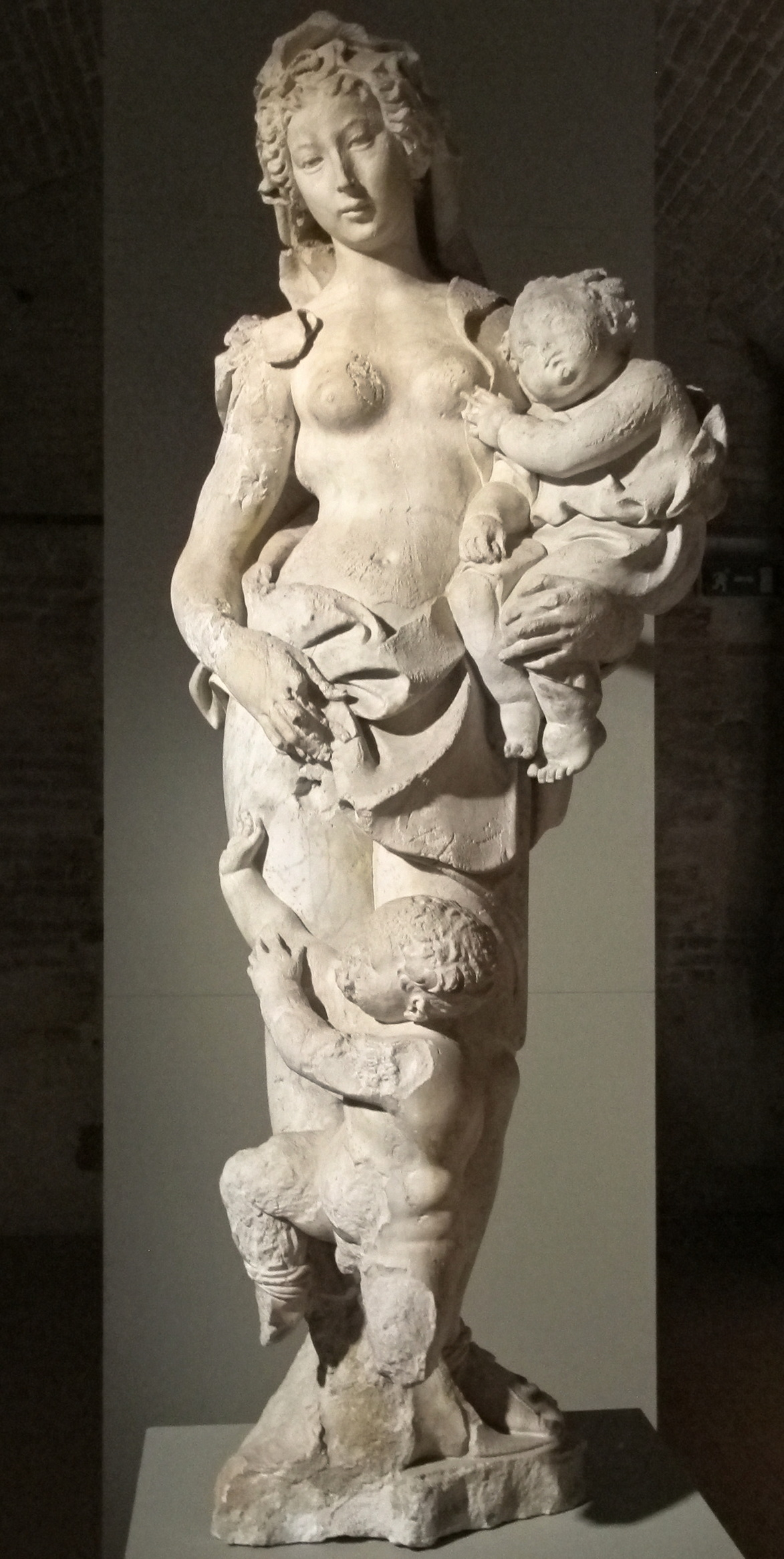
Acca Larentia by Della Quercia

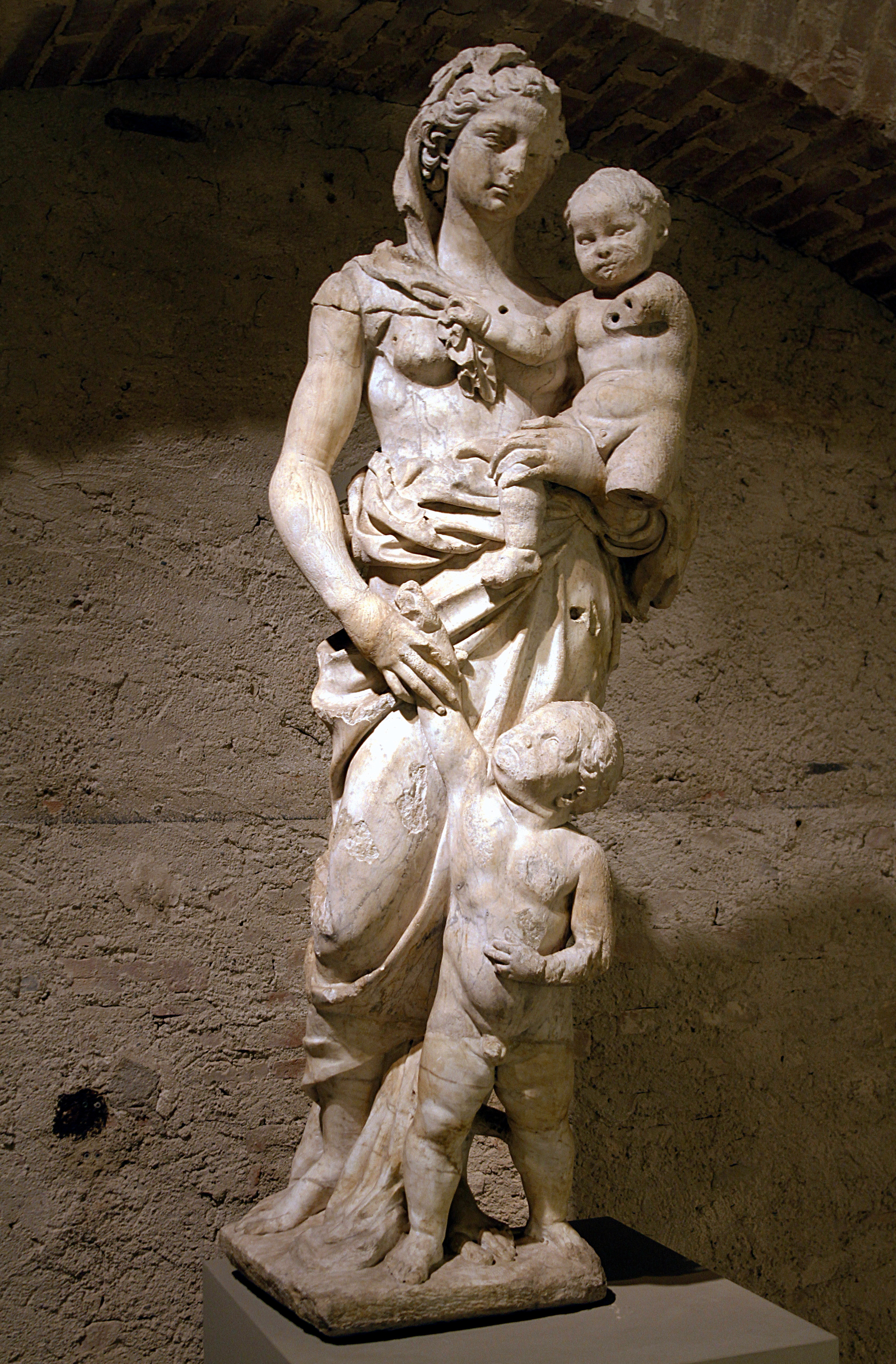
Rea Silvia by Della Quercia

The Fonte Gaia is a monumental fountain located in the Piazza del Campo in the center of Siena, Italy.

The first fountain in the Piazza del Campo was completed in 1342, after hydraulic construction had led water to the site. Underground pipes brought water to the site from 25 kilometers away. Legend holds that the fountain was met with much joy, thus it was given the name Gaia or joyous. Others suggest the term Gaia refers to the Latin term for "bride", and that the fountain was dedicated to the bride of God and patron of Siena, the Virgin Mary. The fountains, plates, and statues conflate Roman matrons' cardinal virtues, with a central relief of the Madonna and Child, framed by stories of Genesis.

In 1419, the fountain had the present decorative frame constructed by Jacopo della Quercia. In 1858, the original marble panels were replaced by copies sculpted by Tito Sarrocchi, under the supervision of architect Giuseppe Partini. The side reliefs depict episodes from Genesis: The Creation of Adam and The Flight from the Garden of Eden. The wolves spouting water, representing the mother-wolf of Remus and Romulus, form part of the reconstructed fountain. Two nude female figures once adorned the front two columns, traditionally believed to represent Rea Silvia and Acca Larentia, in celebration of Siena’s supposed links to ancient Rome. These were not added in the reconstruction but can be viewed along with the original panels at a museum at Santa Maria della Scala, the old hospital overlooking the Piazza del Duomo. The long section of the fountain is adorned at the centre with a Madonna and Child, surrounded by allegories of the Virtues.

== Sources ==
- Description on Siena on line website.
- La Fonte Gaia di Jacopo della Quercia: Storia e restauro di un capolavoro dell'arte senese, Sara Dei, Enrico Toti (Editors)

Madonna and Child with flanking Angels from Fonte Gaia

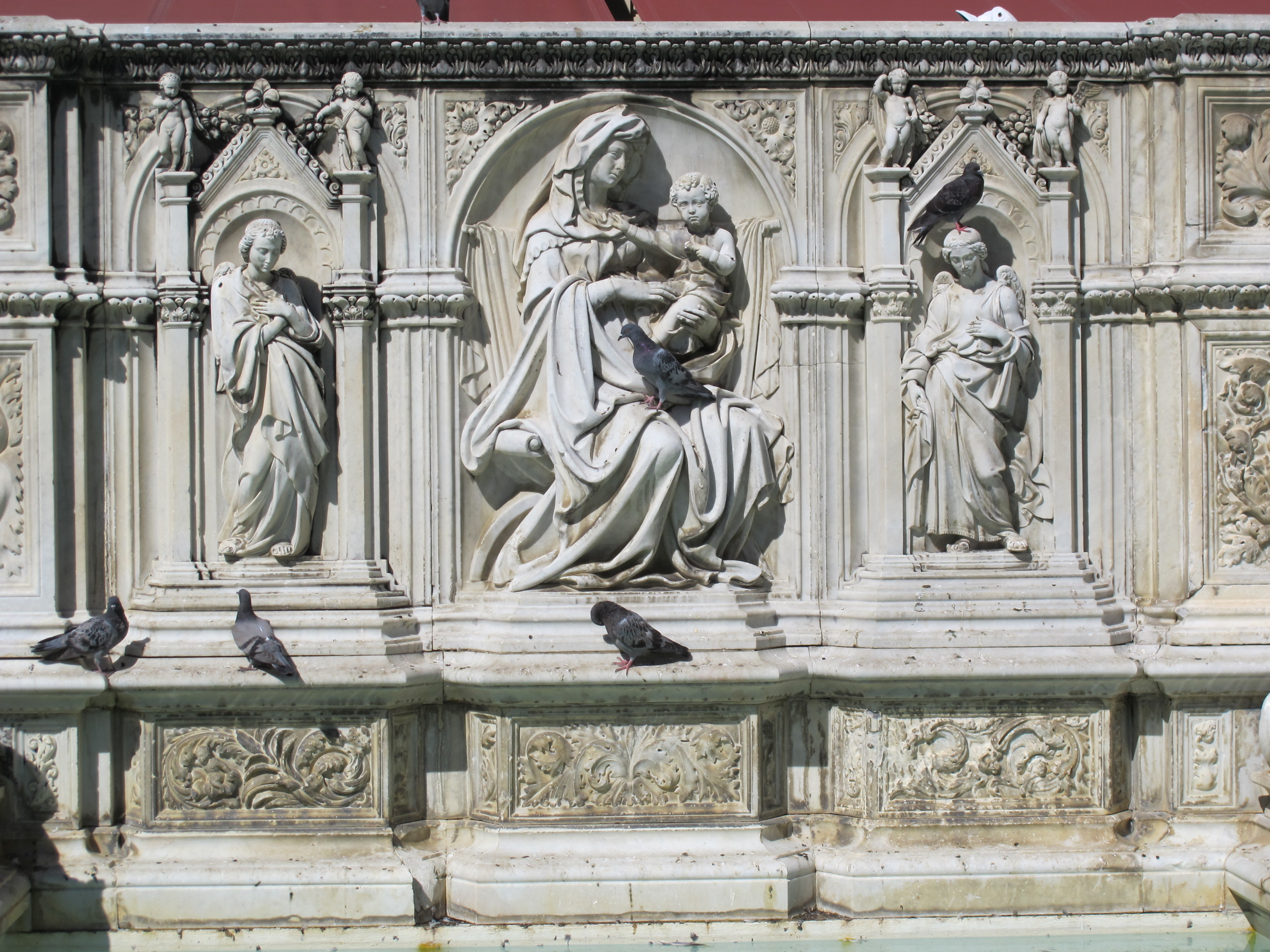
By Sarrocchi (in situ)

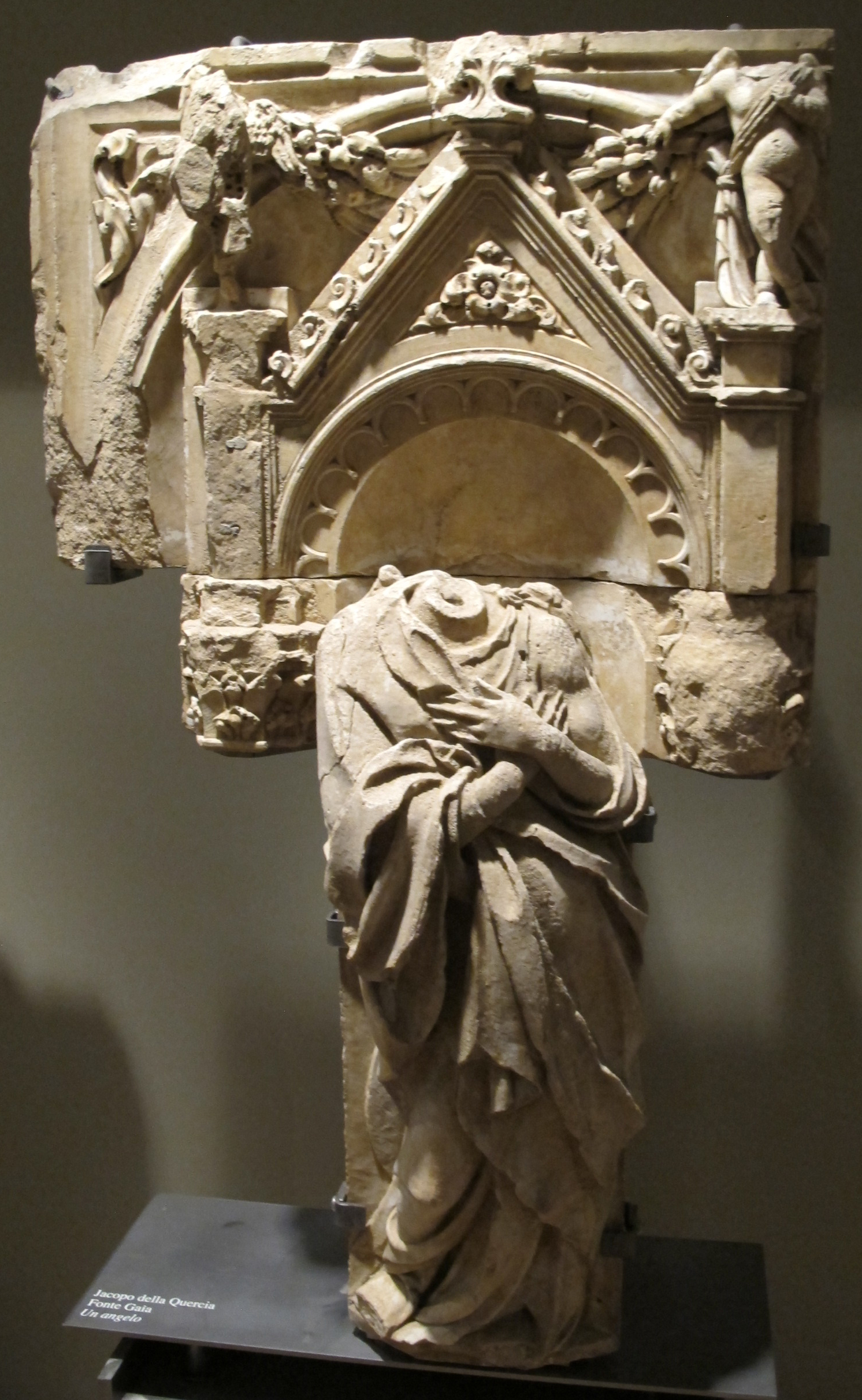
By Della Quercia

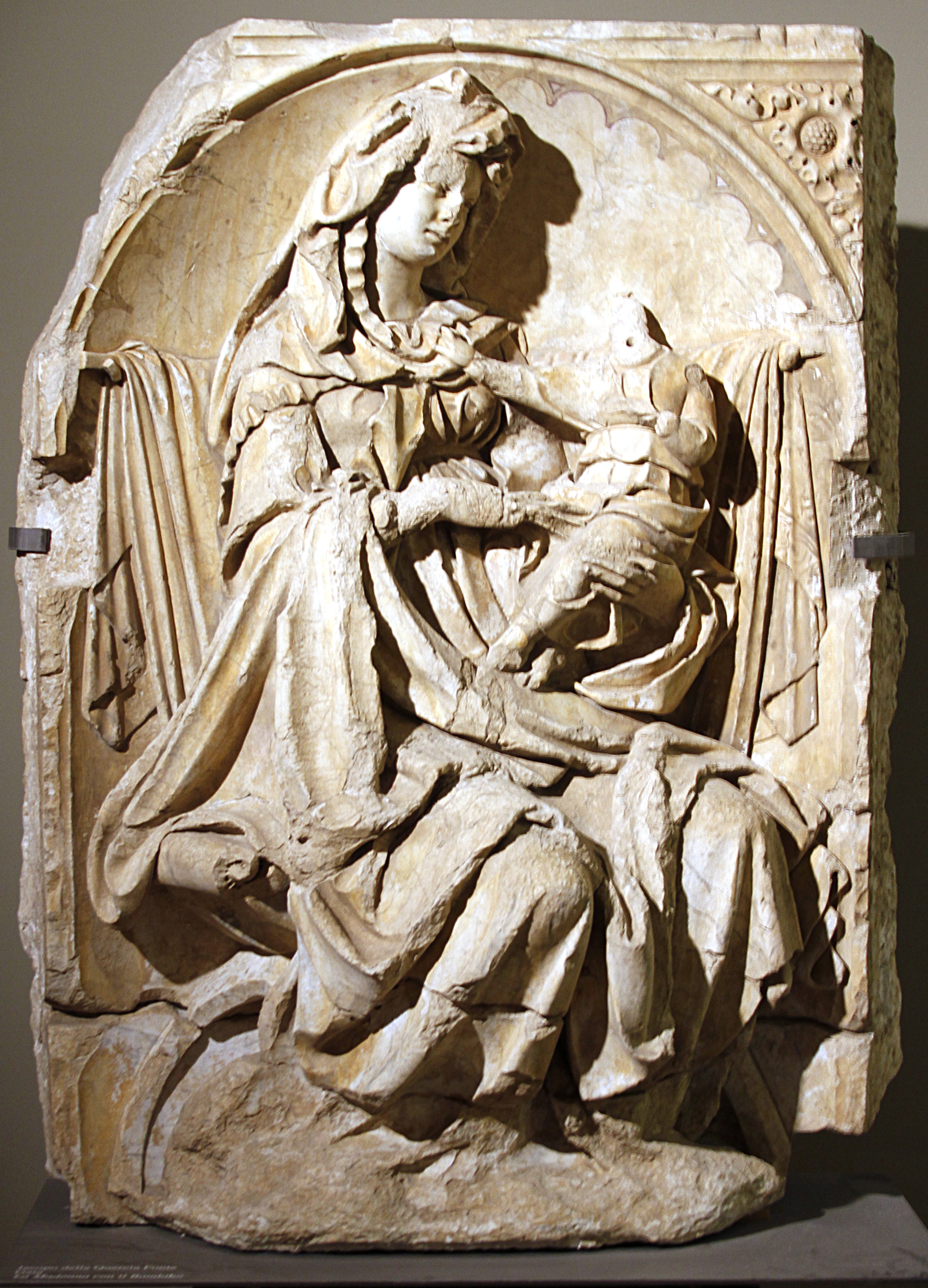
By Della Quercia

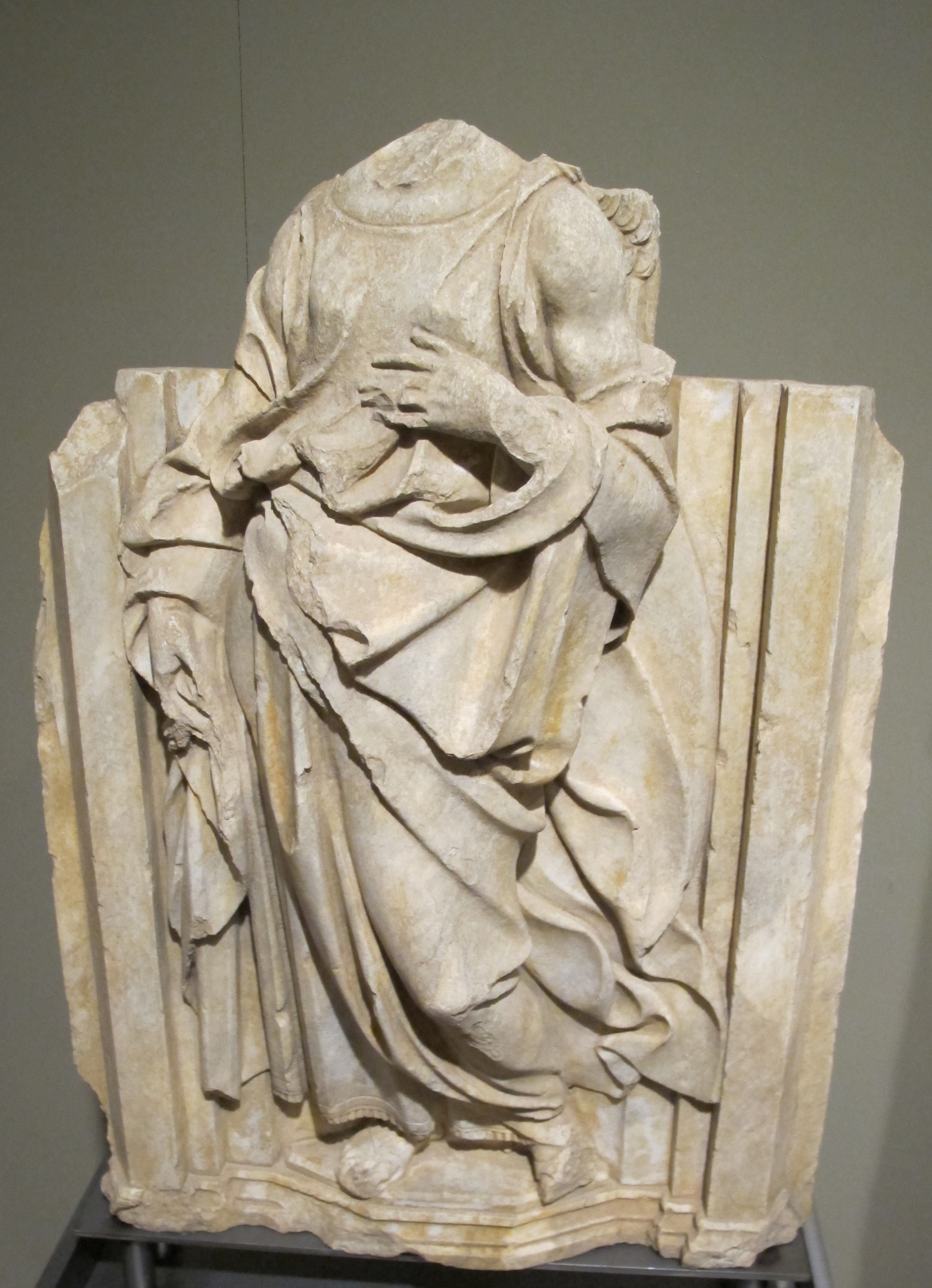
By Della Quercia

Left Panels: Creation of Adam, Wisdom, Hope (and Faith)

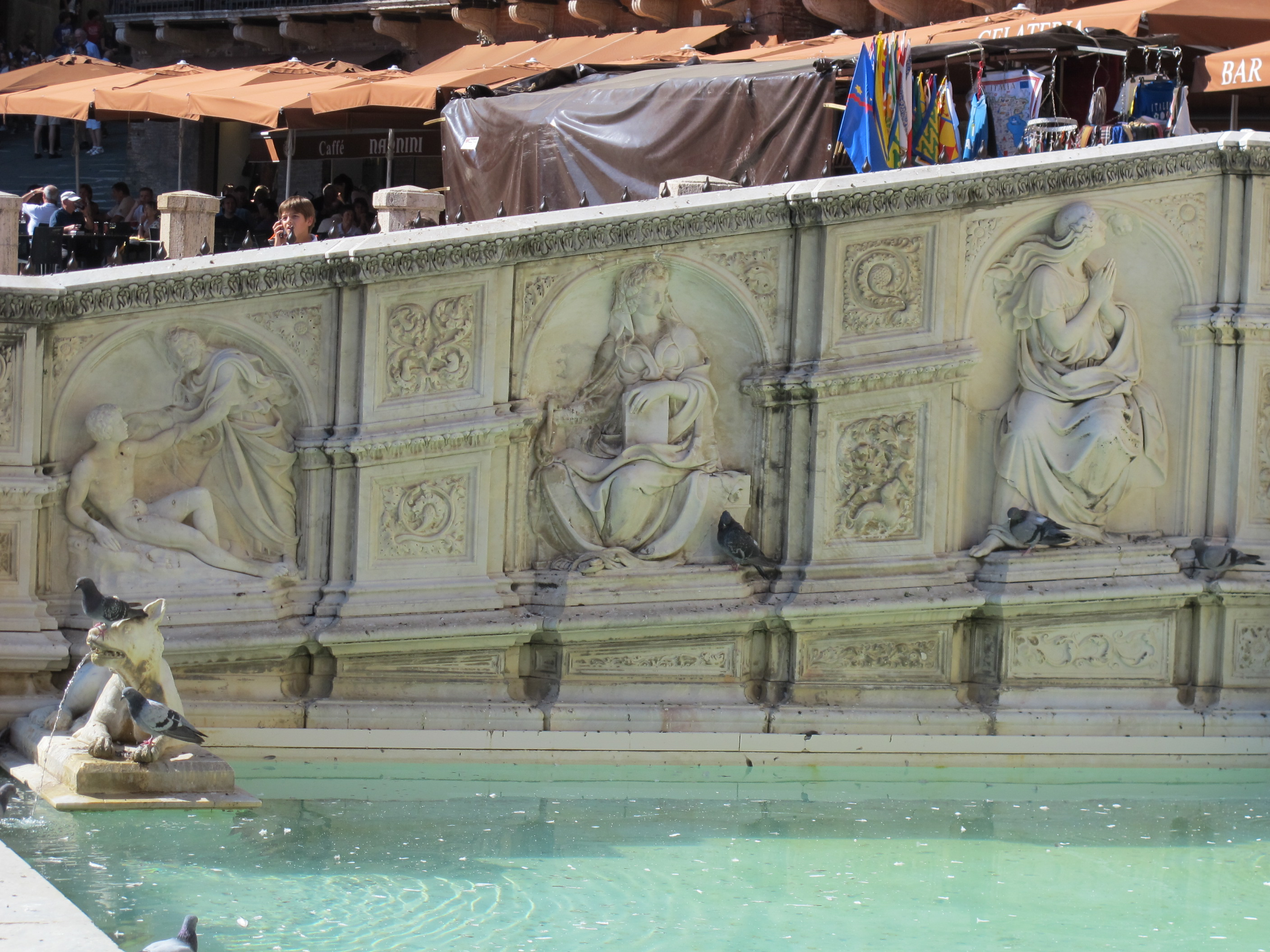
By Sarrocchi (in situ)

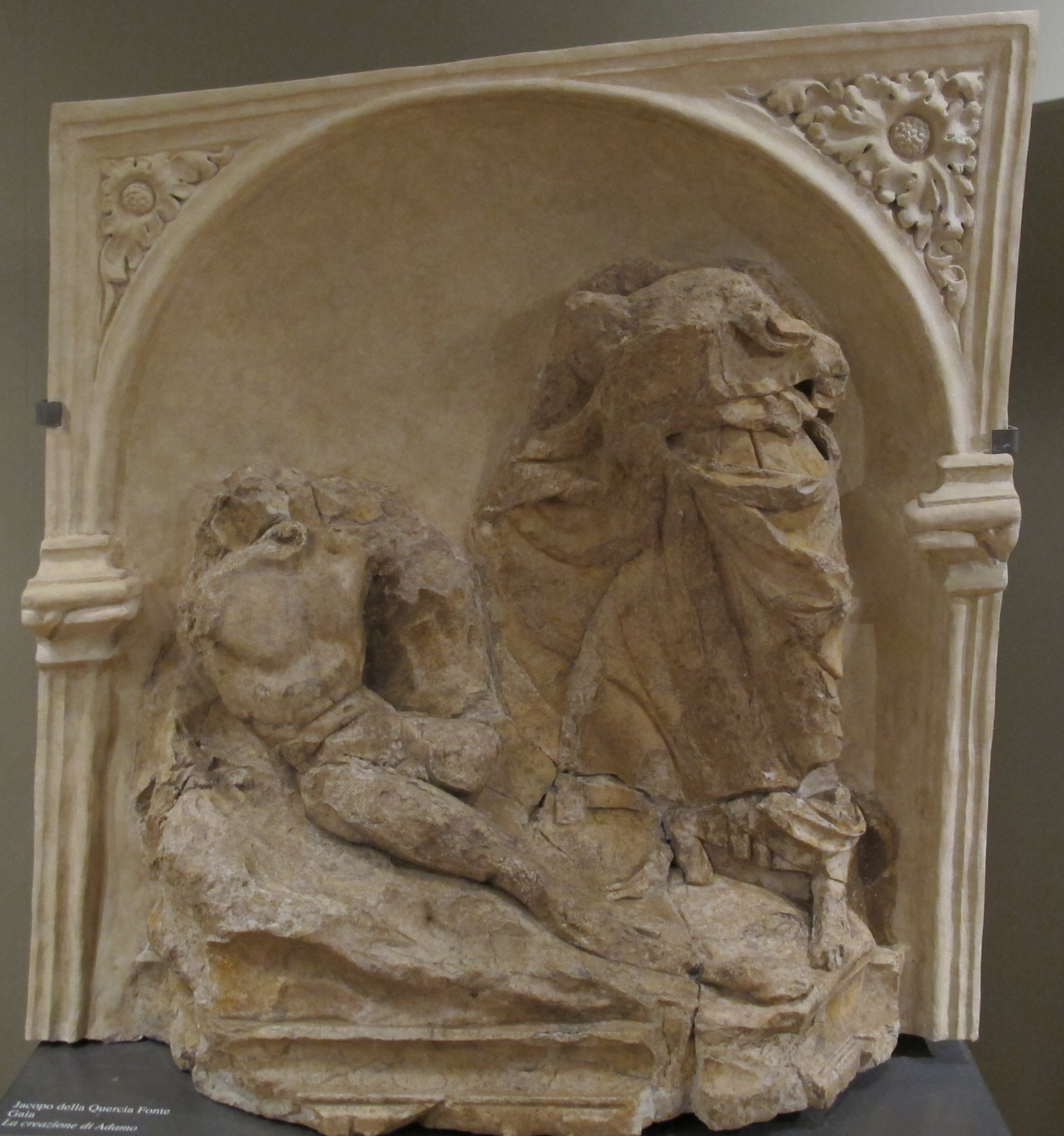
By Della Quercia

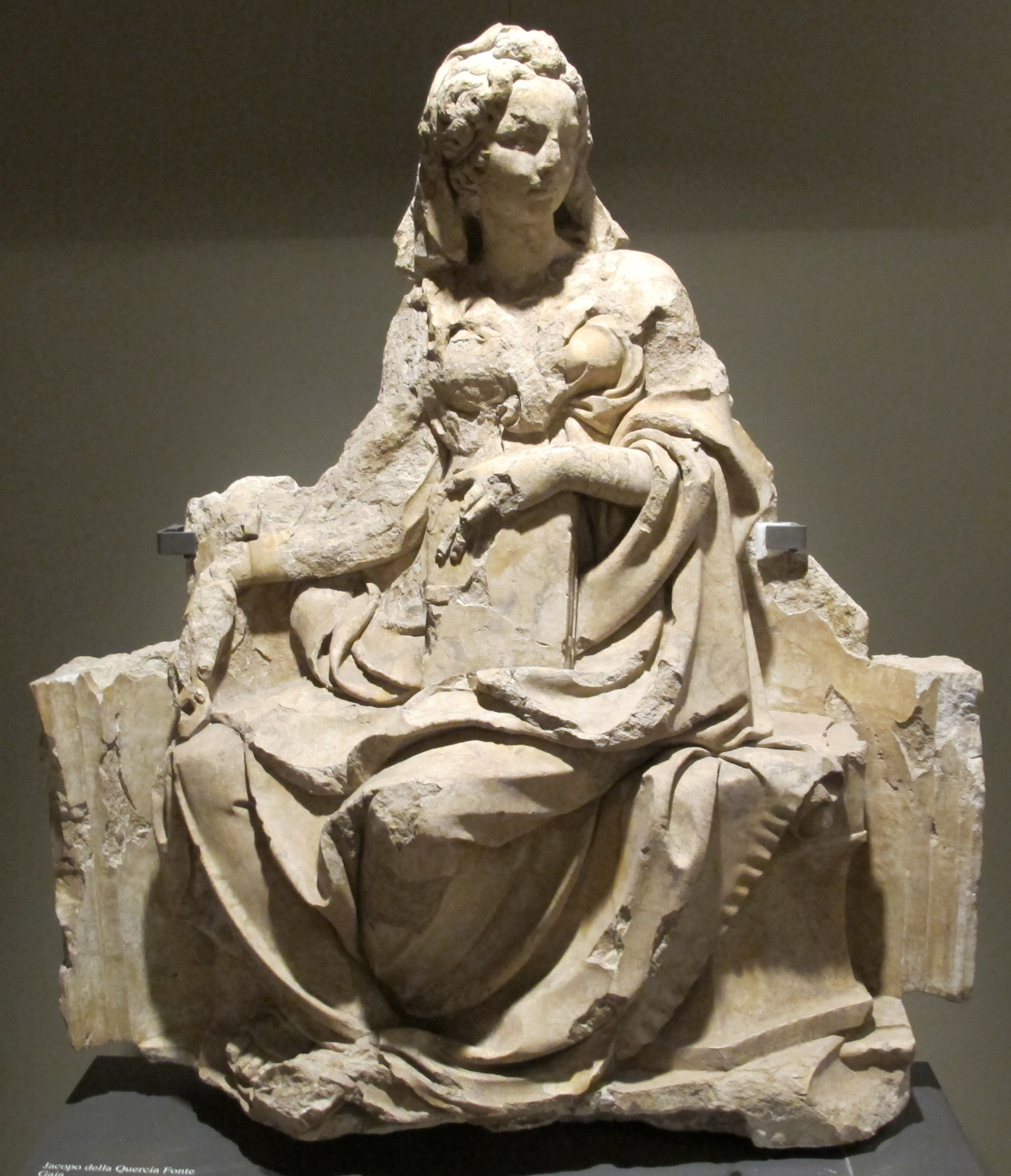
By Della Quercia

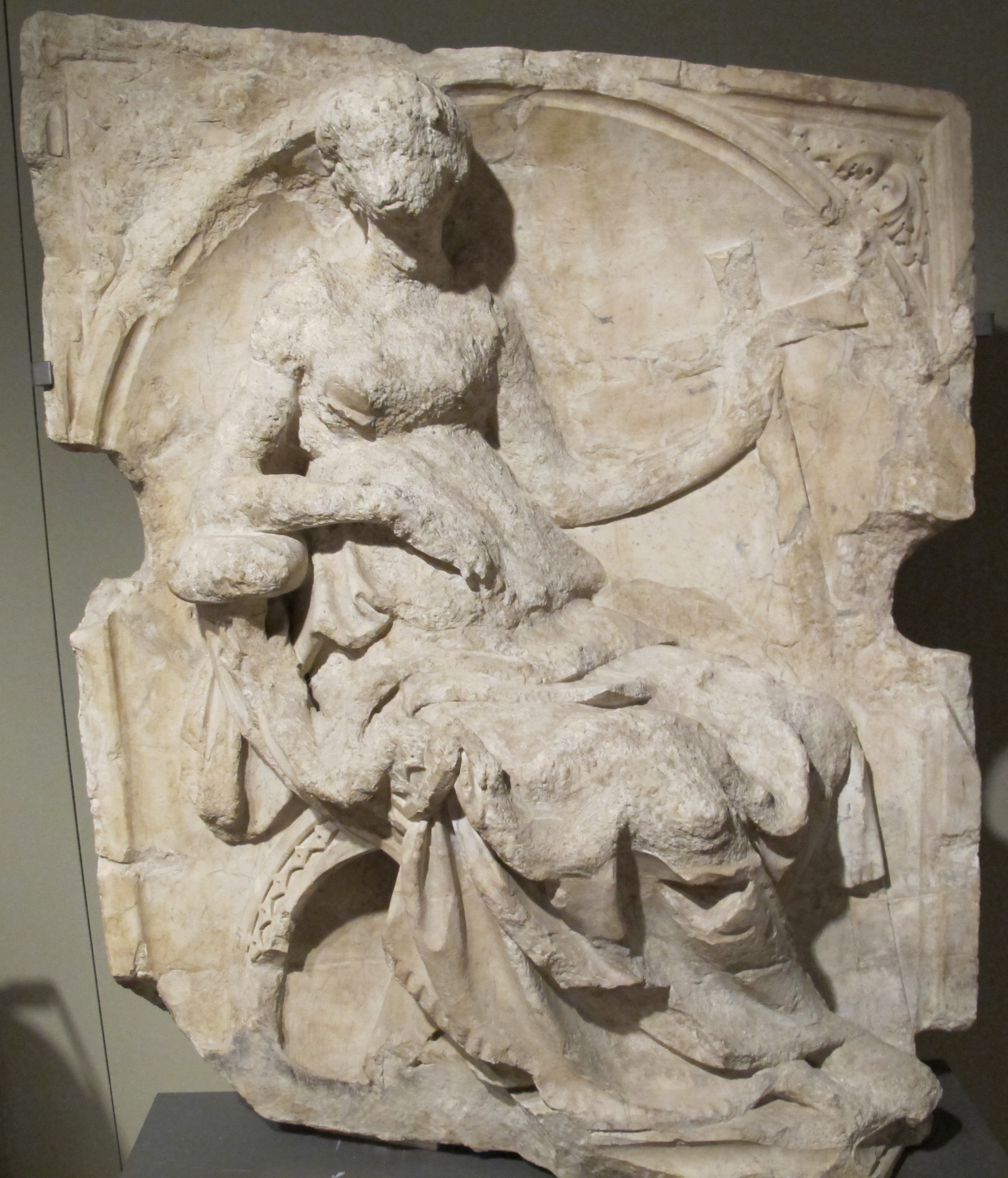
(Faith) By Della Quercia
