= Sant'Andrea Apostolo, Siena =

Church building in Siena, Italy

Coordinates: 43.323455°N 11.328143°E

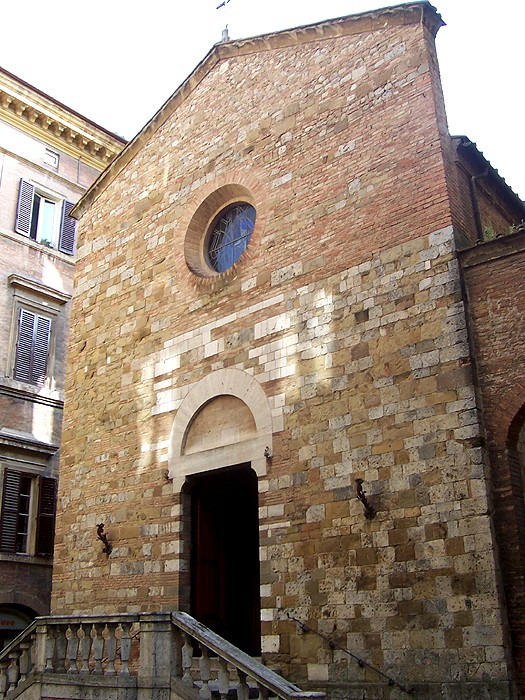
Siena - Church of S. Andrea

Sant’Andrea Apostolo is a Roman Catholic church located on Via dei Montanini 141, near the intersection with Via Giuseppe Garibaldi, in the terzo of Camollia, in the city of Siena, region of Tuscany, Italy.

== History ==
The church was founded in 1175, and has undergone a number of reconstructions, including a major reconstruction in the 18th-century. It has a Romanesque belltower and the facade has balustraded stairs descending laterally at the entrance

Along the left wall are bronze statues depicting Santa Rita and the Baptism of Christ by Bruno Buracchini. The main altar has a polyptych of the Coronation of the Virgin with Saints Peter and Andrew (1445) by Giovanni di Paolo. Along the right side are the 15th-century frescoes attributed to Martino di Bartolomeo. The stained glass windows were completed by Giorgio Quaroni.
