= Presciano =

- Frazione
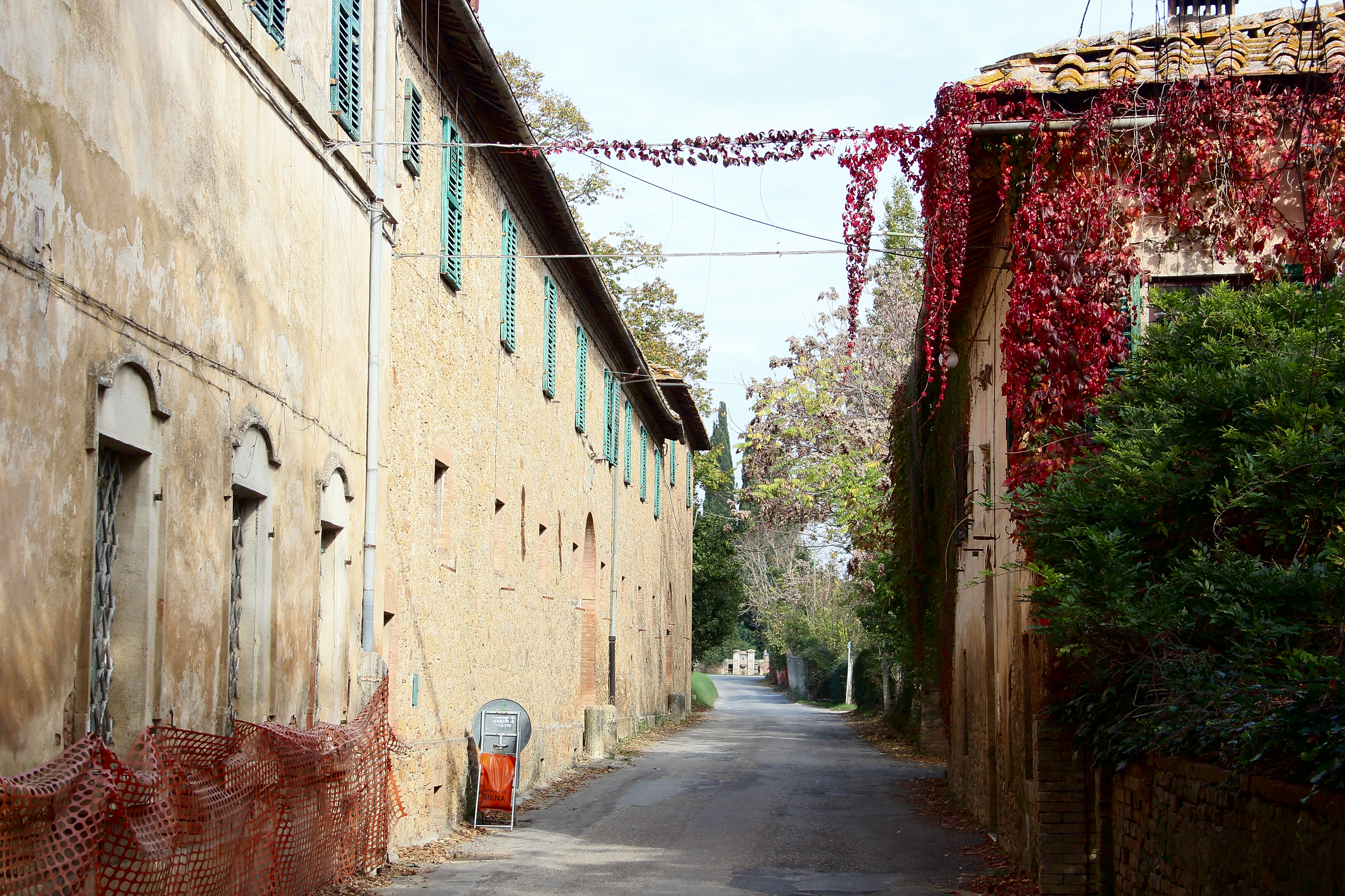
- The main road in Presciano

- Location of Presciano in Italy
- Coordinates: 43°18′19″N 11°24′10″E
- Country: Italy
- Region: Tuscany
- Province: Siena (SI)
- Comune: Siena
- Elevation: 225 m (738 ft)

Population (2011)
  - Total: 35
- Time zone: UTC+1 (CET)
  - Summer (DST): UTC+2 (CEST)

Presciano is a village in Tuscany, central Italy, in the comune of Siena, province of Siena. At the time of the 2001 census its population was 60.

Presciano is about 12 km from Siena.

== Gallery ==
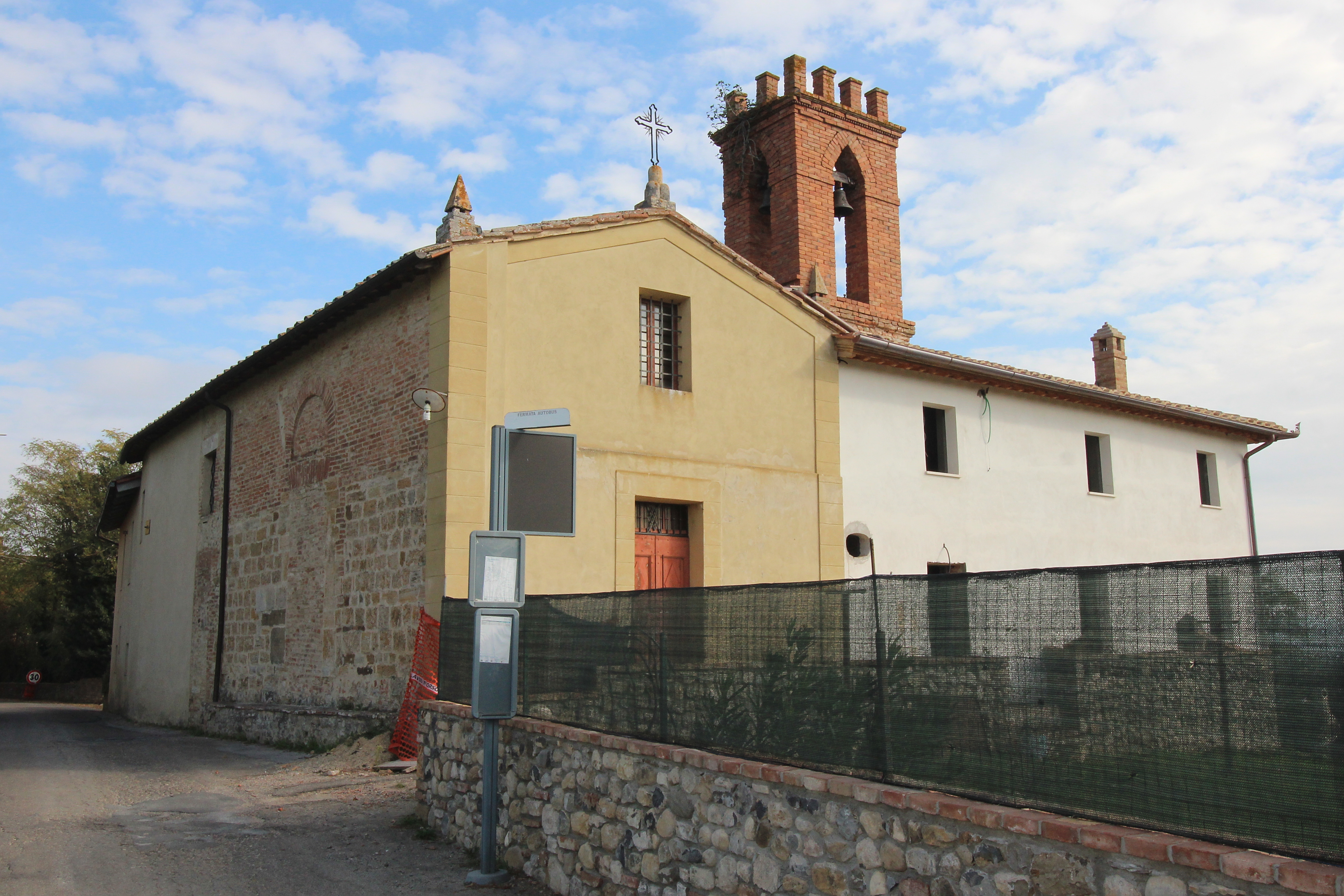
The church San Paolo

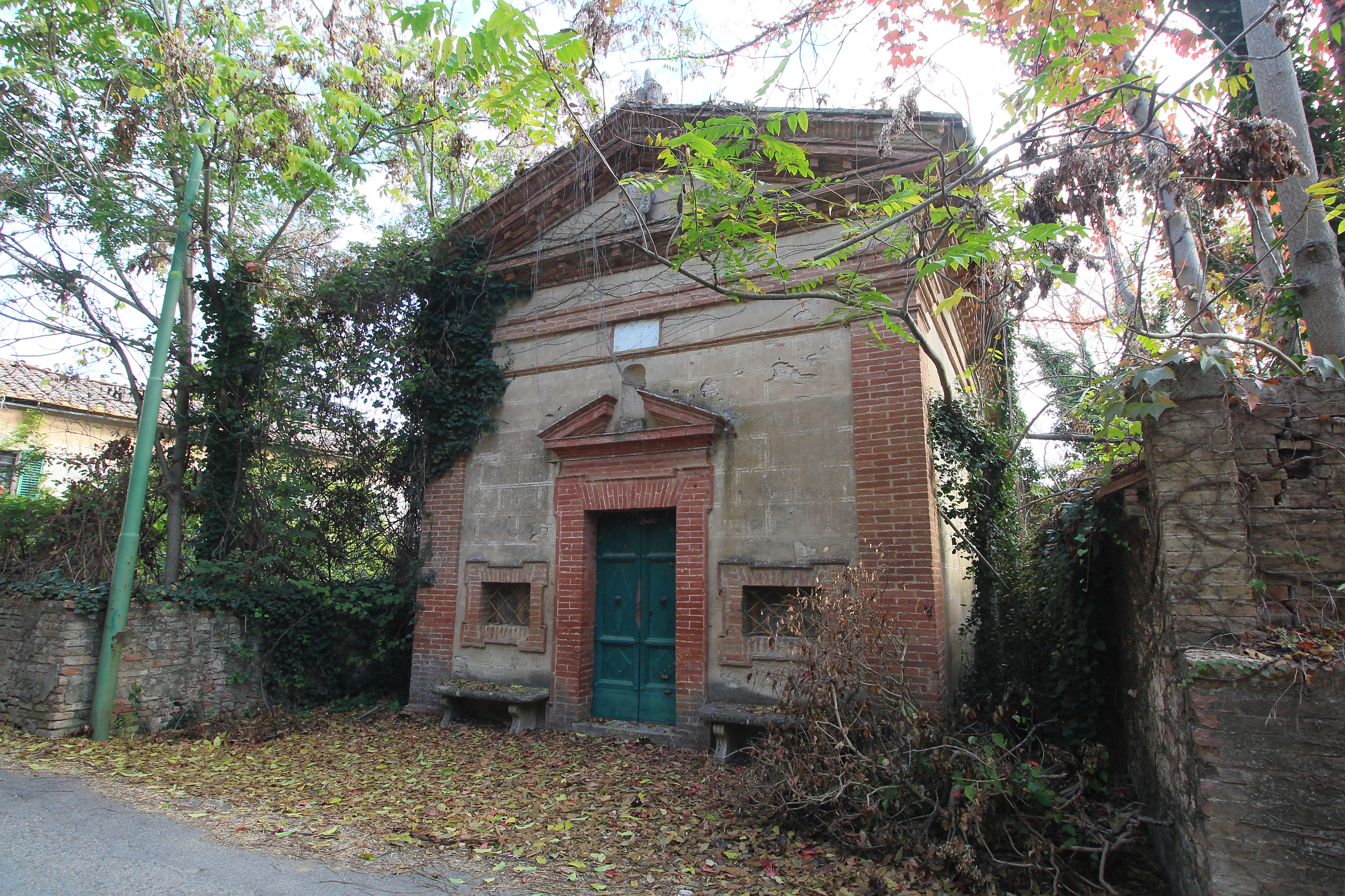
The chapel of Villa Pieri (now Lovatelli), Sant'Antonio da Padova

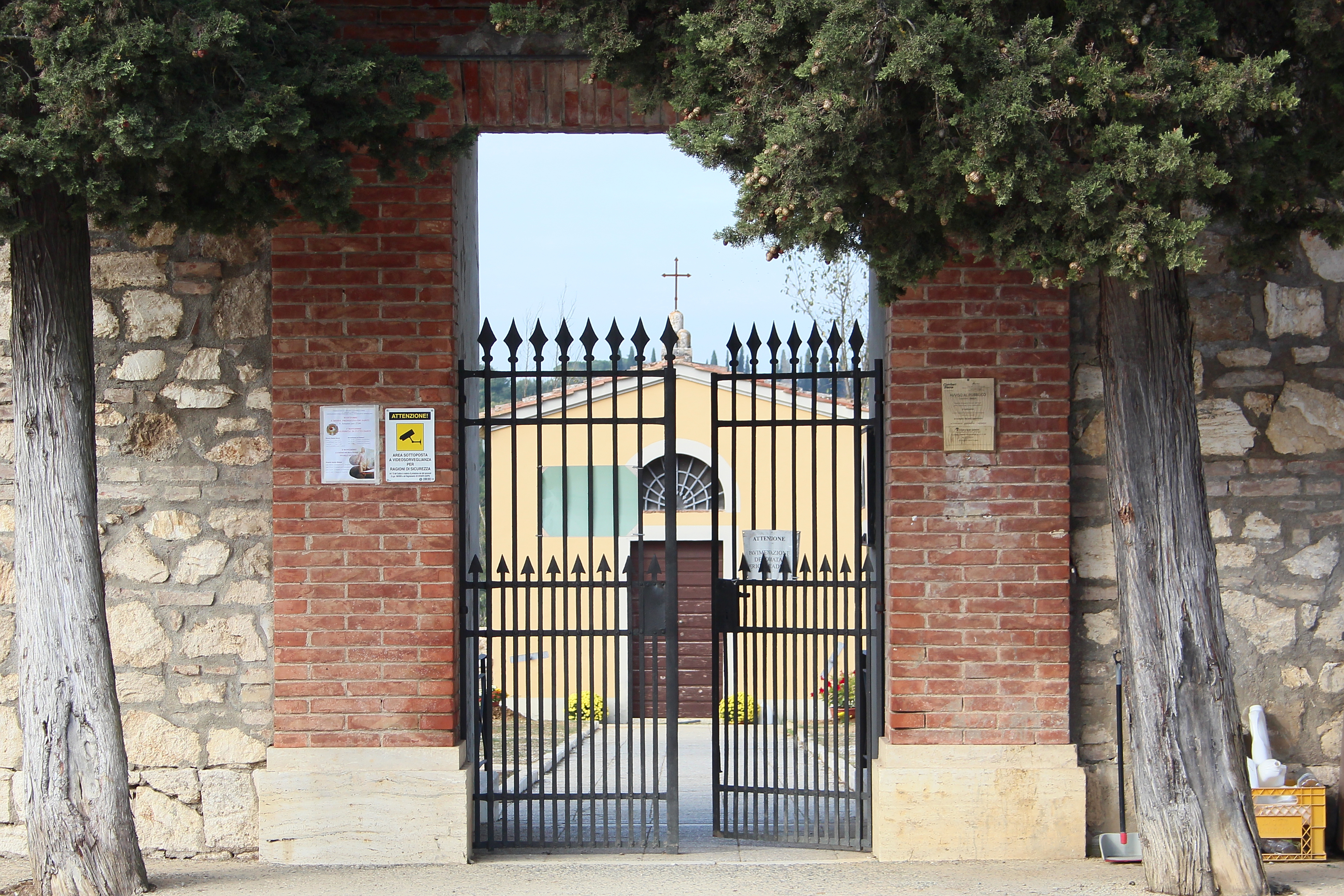
The cemetery of Presciano
