= Colle Malamerenda =

- Frazione
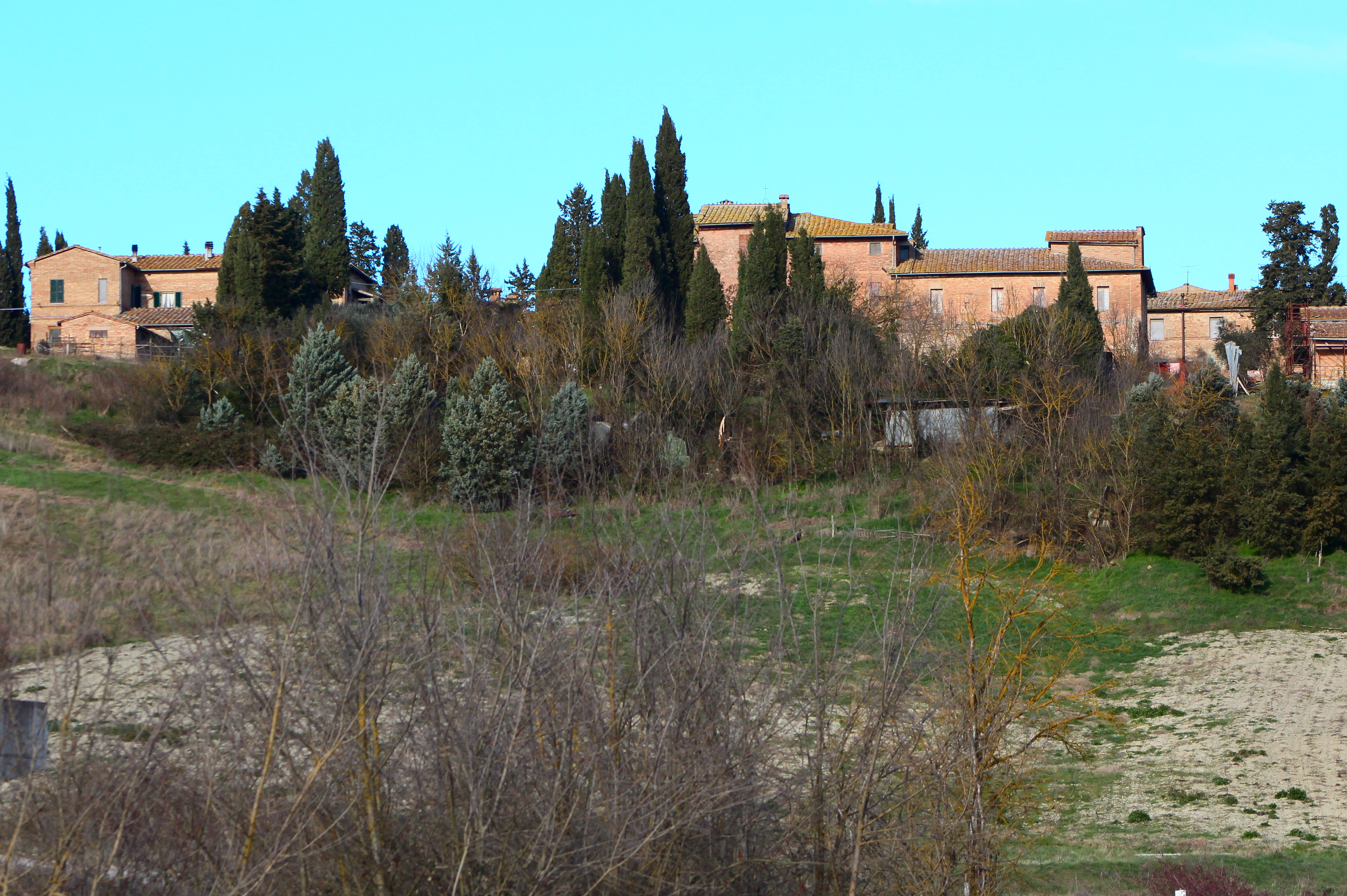
- View of Colle Malamerenda

- Location of Colle Malamerenda in Italy
- Coordinates: 43°16′14″N 11°21′36″E
- Country: Italy
- Region: Tuscany
- Province: Siena (SI)
- Comune: Siena
- Elevation: 233 m (764 ft)

Population (2001)
  - Total: 78
- Time zone: UTC+1 (CET)
  - Summer (DST): UTC+2 (CEST)

Colle Malamerenda is a village in Tuscany, central Italy, in the comune of Siena, province of Siena. At the time of the 2001 census its population was 78.

Colle Malamerenda is about 6 km from Siena.
