= Monteliscai =

- Frazione
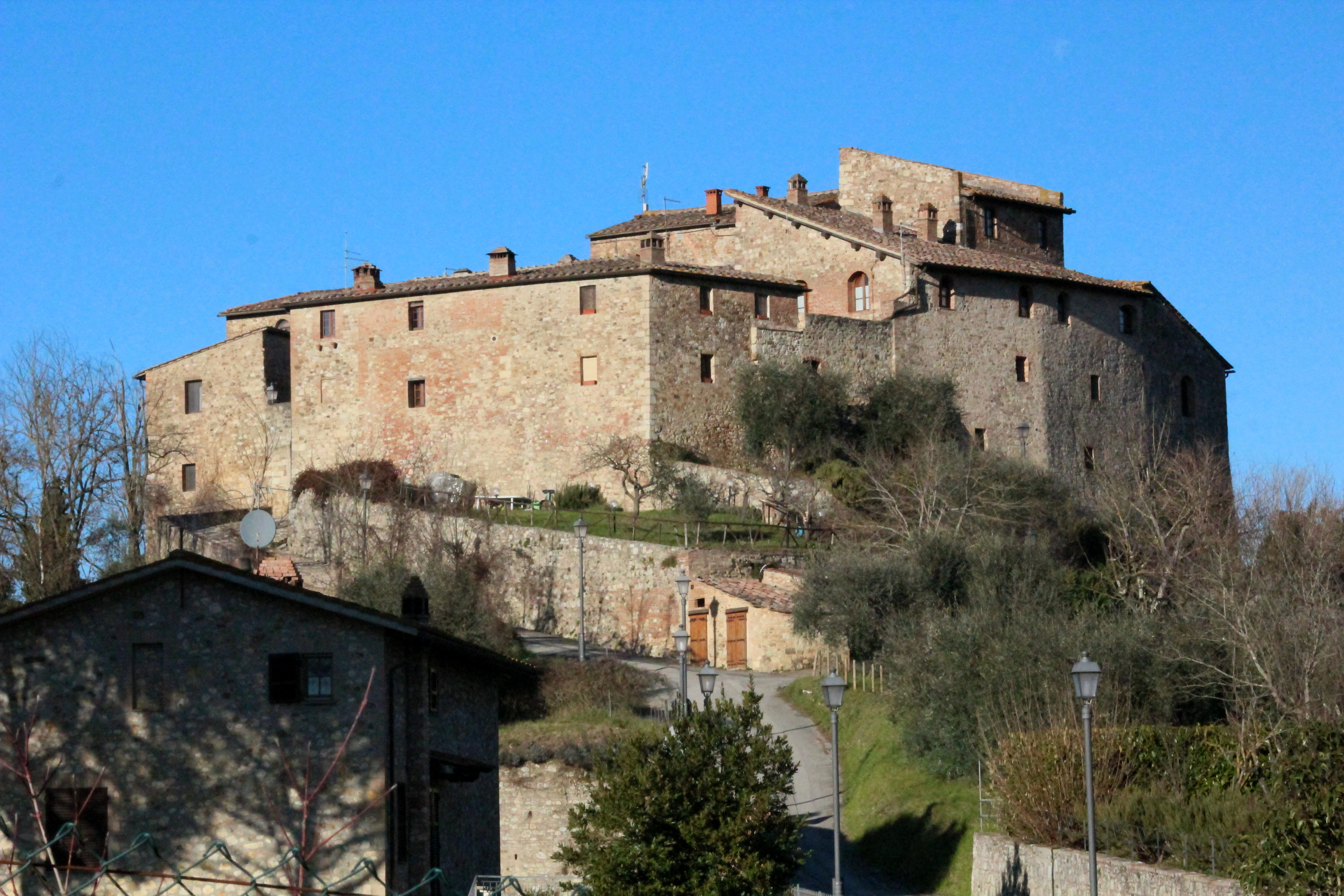
- View of Monteliscai

- Location of Monteliscai in Italy
- Coordinates: 43°20′49″N 11°21′42″E
- Country: Italy
- Region: Tuscany
- Province: Siena (SI)
- Comune: Siena
- Elevation: 290 m (950 ft)

Population (2011)
  - Total: 60
- Time zone: UTC+1 (CET)
  - Summer (DST): UTC+2 (CEST)

Monteliscai is a village in Tuscany, central Italy, in the comune of Siena, province of Siena. At the time of the 2001 census its population was 67.

Monteliscai is about 9 km from Siena.
