= Le Tolfe =

- Frazione
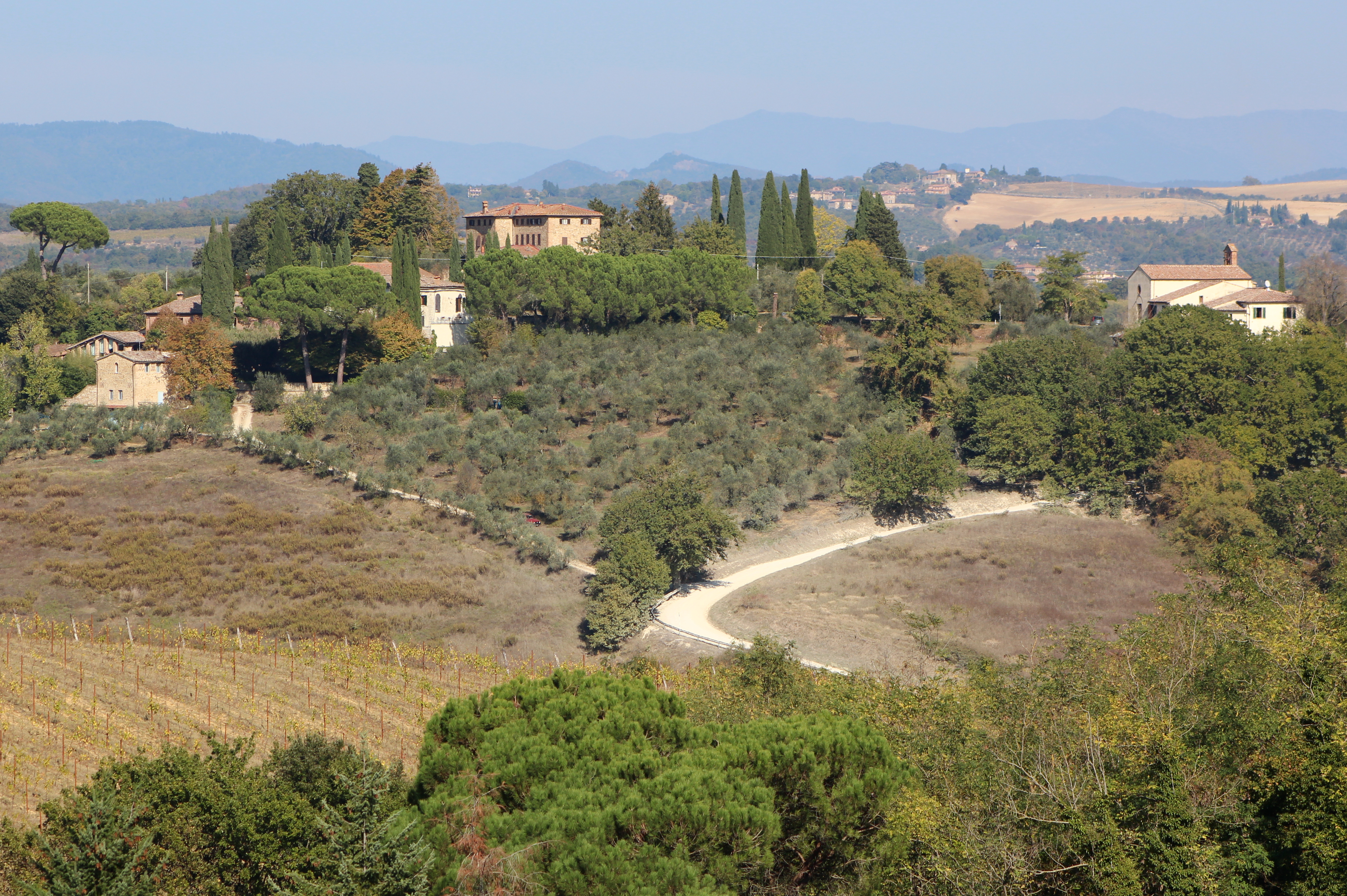
- View of Le Tolfe

- Location of Le Tolfe in Italy
- Coordinates: 43°20′46″N 11°20′52″E
- Country: Italy
- Region: Tuscany
- Province: Siena (SI)
- Comune: Siena
- Elevation: 322 m (1,056 ft)

Population (2011)
  - Total: 35
- Time zone: UTC+1 (CET)
  - Summer (DST): UTC+2 (CEST)

Le Tolfe is a village in Tuscany, central Italy, in the comune of Siena, province of Siena. At the time of the 2001 census its population was 30.

Le Tolfe is about 9 km from Siena.
