= Pieve a Bozzone =

- Frazione
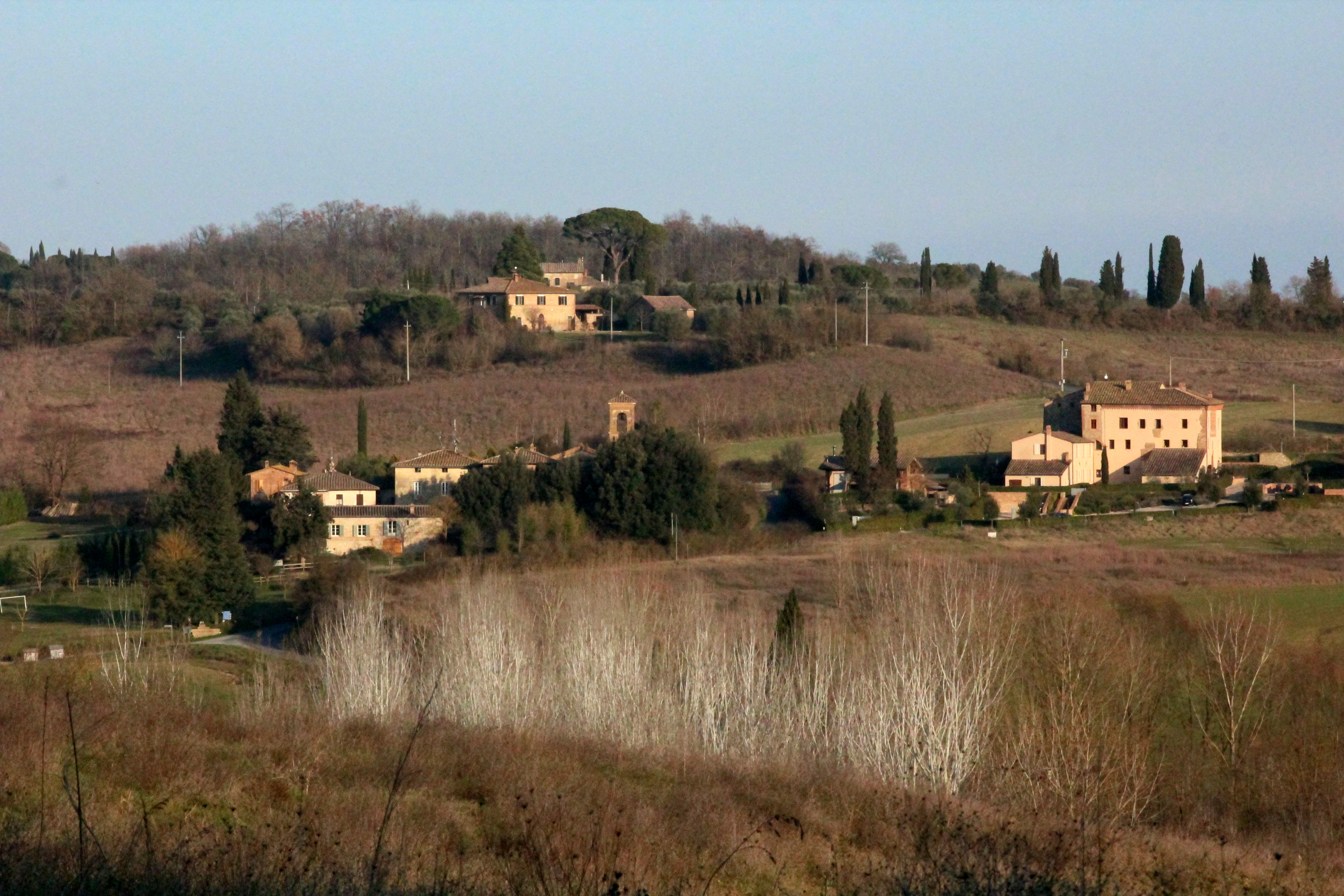
- View of Pieve a Bozzone

- Location of Pieve a Bozzone in Italy
- Coordinates: 43°19′13″N 11°23′6″E
- Country: Italy
- Region: Tuscany
- Province: Siena (SI)
- Comune: Siena
- Elevation: 215 m (705 ft)

Population (2011)
  - Total: 35
- Time zone: UTC+1 (CET)
  - Summer (DST): UTC+2 (CEST)

Pieve a Bozzone is a village in Tuscany, central Italy, in the comune of Siena, province of Siena. At the time of the 2001 census its population was 28.

Pieve a Bozzone is about 10 km from Siena.
