= Agostoli =

- Frazione
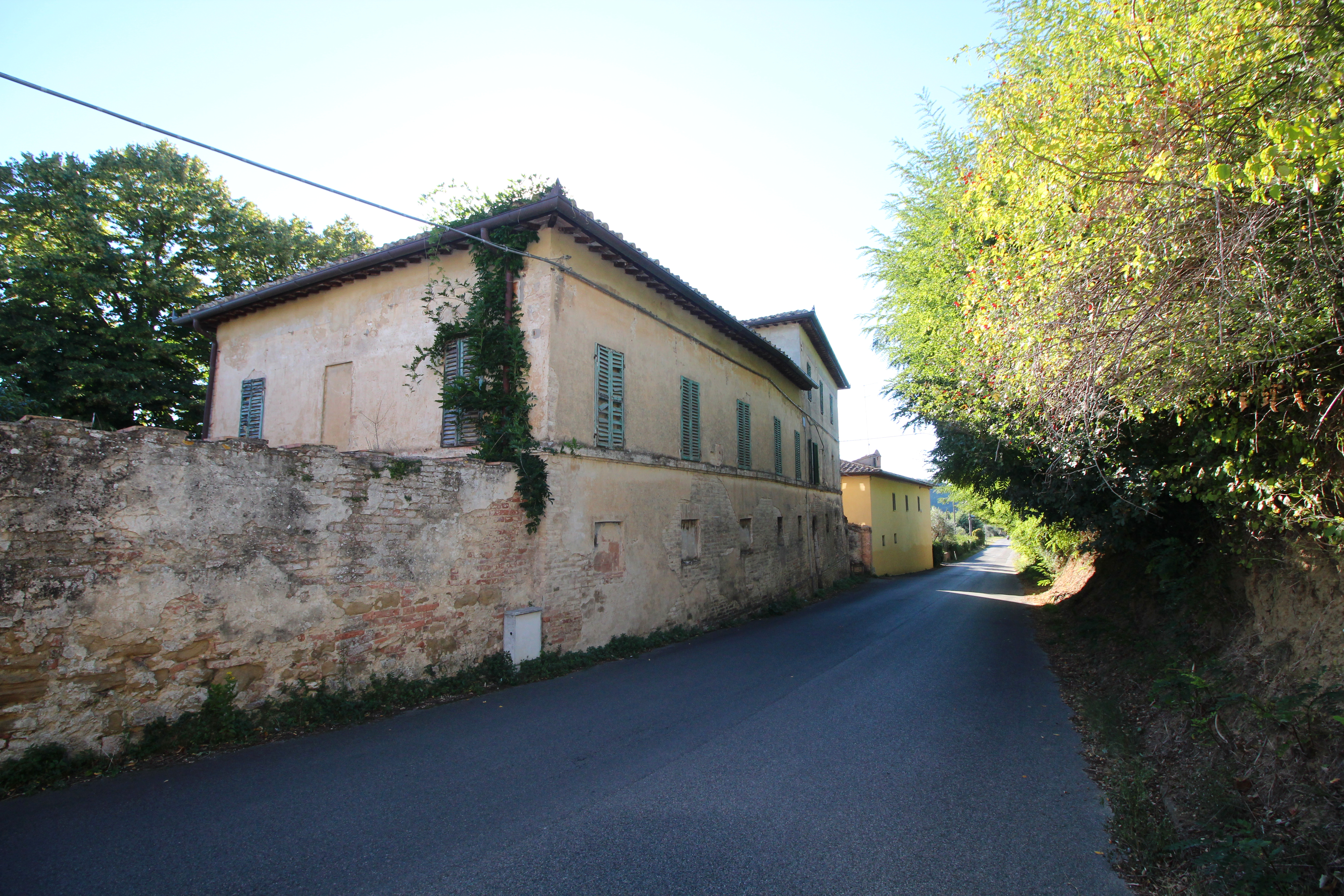

- Location of Agostoli in Italy
- Coordinates: 43°18′35″N 11°17′56″E
- Country: Italy
- Region: Tuscany
- Province: Siena (SI)
- Comune: Siena
- Elevation: 337 m (1,106 ft)

Population (2011)
  - Total: 28
- Time zone: UTC+1 (CET)
  - Summer (DST): UTC+2 (CEST)

Agostoli is a village in Tuscany, central Italy, in the comune of Siena, province of Siena. At the time of the 2001 census its population was 28.

Agostoli is about 5 km from Siena.
