= Bolgione =

- Frazione
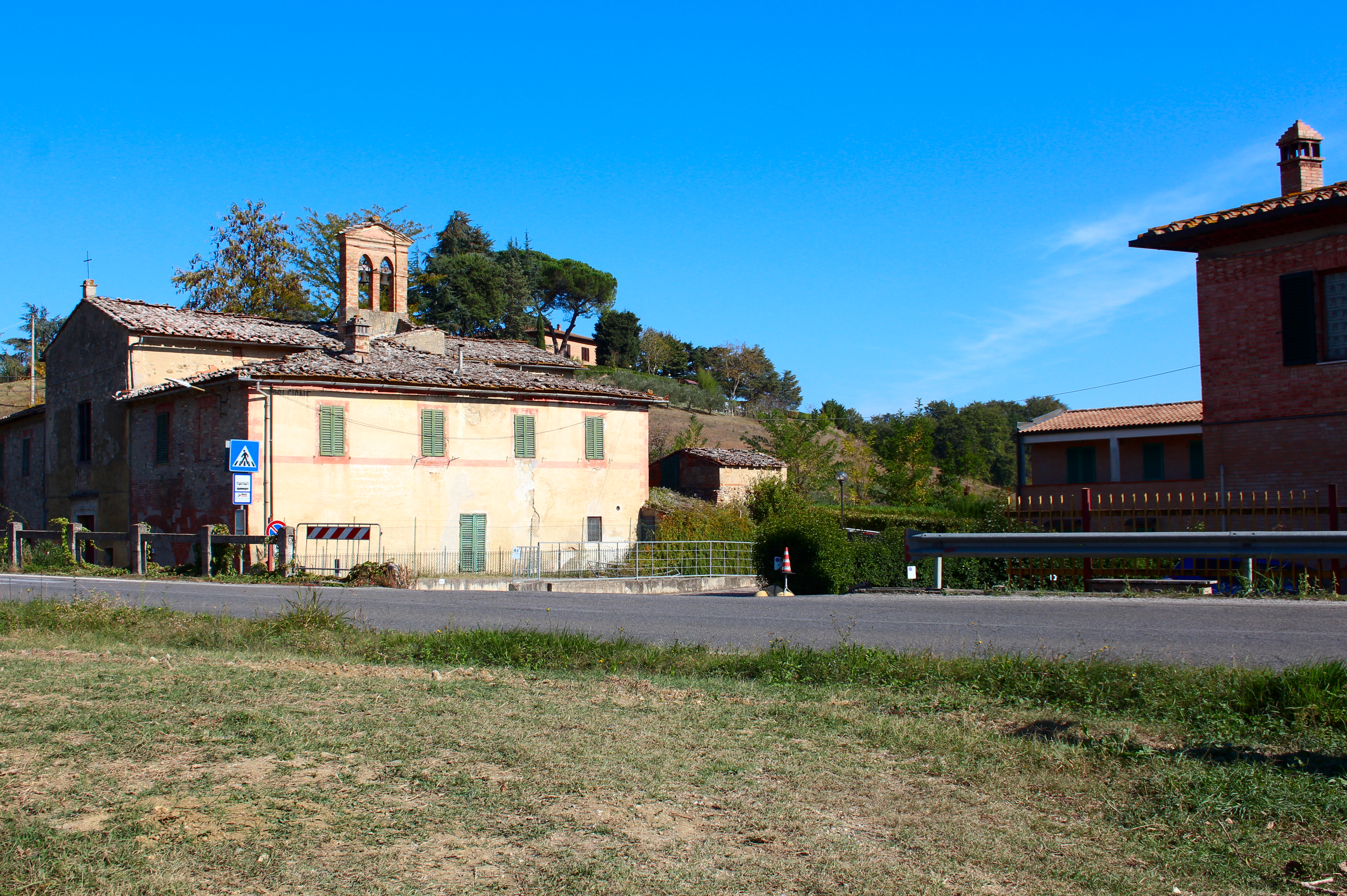

- Location of Bolgione in Italy
- Coordinates: 43°20′26″N 11°21′29″E
- Country: Italy
- Region: Tuscany
- Province: Siena (SI)
- Comune: Siena
- Elevation: 270 m (890 ft)

Population (2001)
  - Total: 138
- Time zone: UTC+1 (CET)
  - Summer (DST): UTC+2 (CEST)

Bolgione is a village in Tuscany, central Italy, in the comune of Siena, province of Siena. At the time of the 2001 census its population was 138.

Bolgione is about 5 km from Siena.
