= Santa Regina, Siena =

Santa Regina
- Frazione
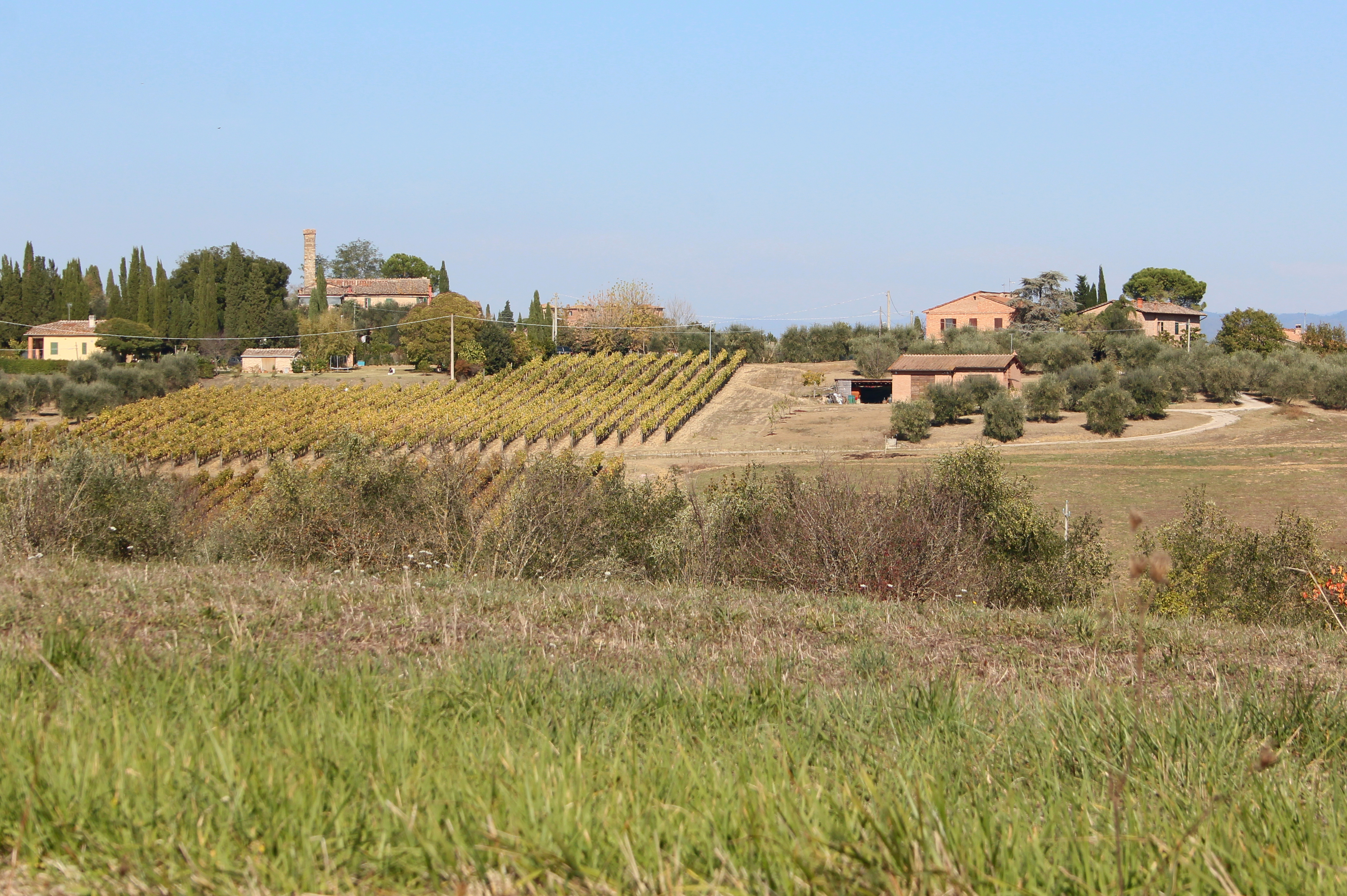
- View of Santa Regina

- Location of Santa Regina in Italy
- Coordinates: 43°18′55″N 11°21′59″E
- Country: Italy
- Region: Tuscany
- Province: Siena (SI)
- Comune: Siena
- Elevation: 272 m (892 ft)

Population (2011)
  - Total: 59
- Time zone: UTC+1 (CET)
  - Summer (DST): UTC+2 (CEST)

Santa Regina is a village in Tuscany, central Italy, in the comune of Siena, province of Siena. At the time of the 2001 census its population was 60.

Santa Regina is about 10 km from Siena.
