= Val di Pugna =

- Frazione
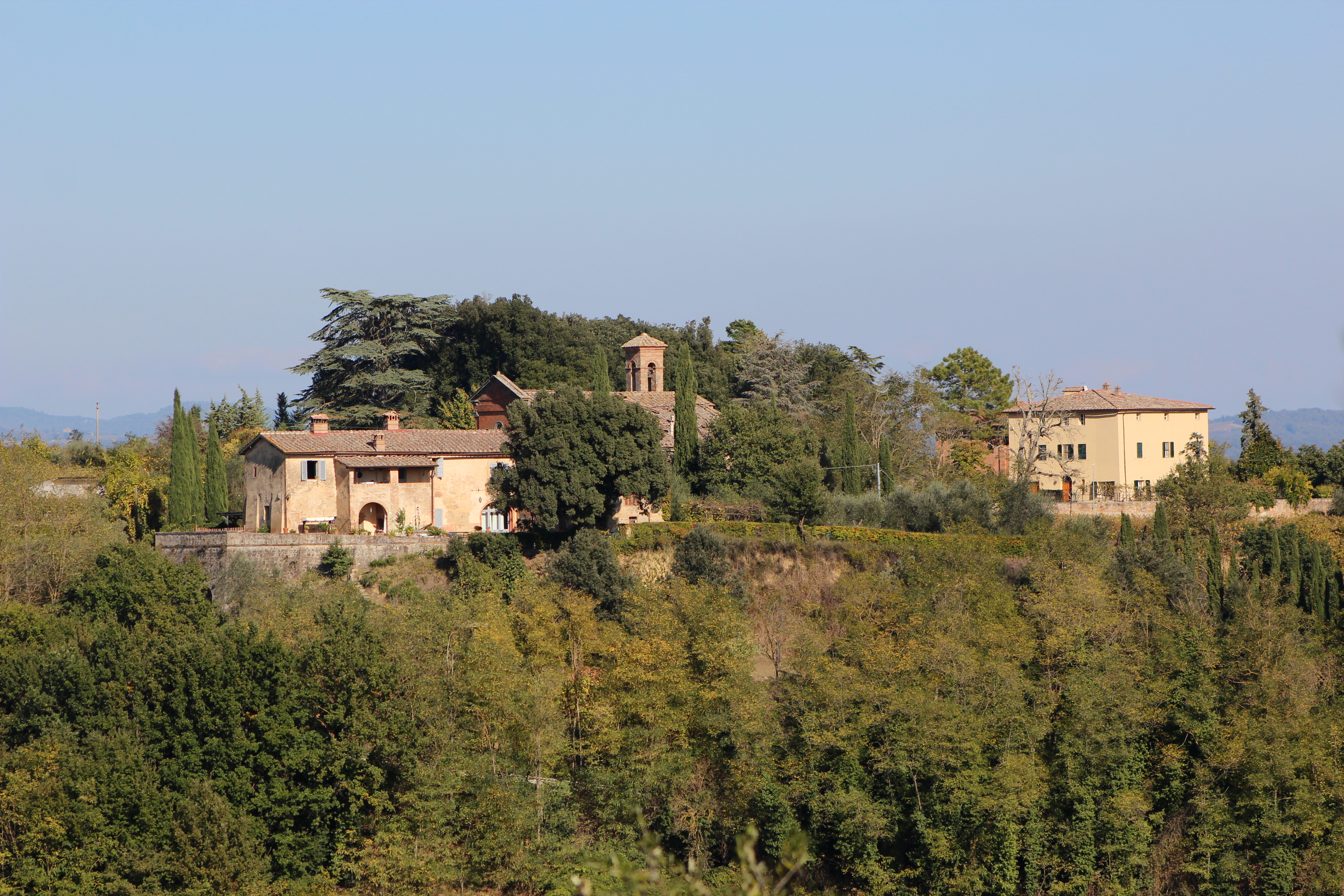
- View of Val di Pugna

- Location of Val di Pugna in Italy
- Coordinates: 43°18′24″N 11°22′8″E
- Country: Italy
- Region: Tuscany
- Province: Siena (SI)
- Comune: Siena
- Elevation: 252 m (827 ft)

Population (2011)
  - Total: 26
- Time zone: UTC+1 (CET)
  - Summer (DST): UTC+2 (CEST)

Val di Pugna is a village in Tuscany, central Italy, in the comune of Siena, province of Siena. At the time of the 2001 census its population was 34.

Val di Pugna is about 10 km from Siena.
