= Volte Alte =

- Frazione
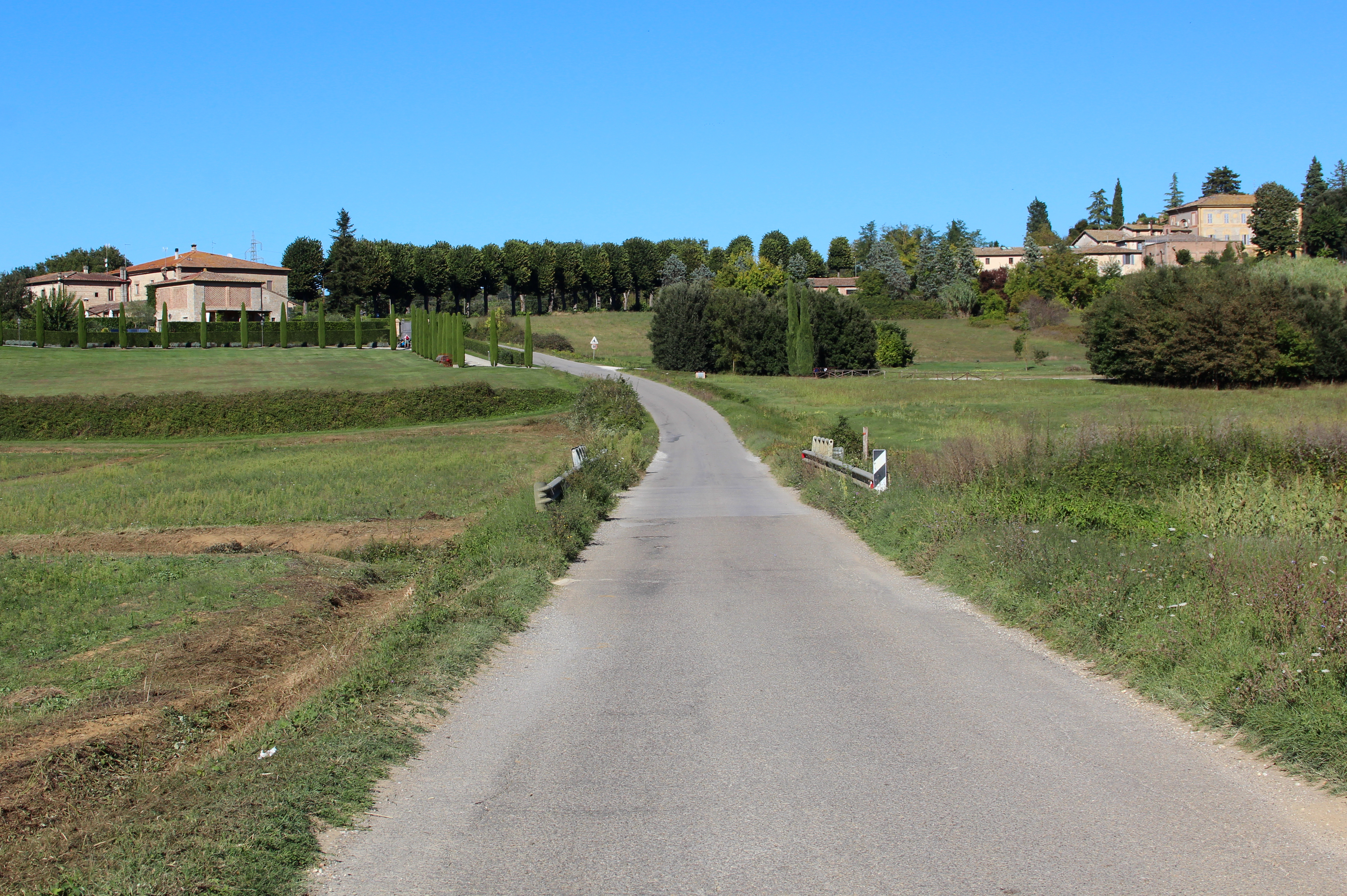
- View of Volte Alte

- Location of Volte Alte in Italy
- Coordinates: 43°17′11″N 11°16′41″E
- Country: Italy
- Region: Tuscany
- Province: Siena (SI)
- Comune: Siena
- Elevation: 244 m (801 ft)

Population (2011)
  - Total: 43
- Time zone: UTC+1 (CET)
  - Summer (DST): UTC+2 (CEST)

Volte Alte is a village in Tuscany, central Italy, in the comune of Siena, province of Siena. At the time of the 2001 census its population was 46.

Volte Alte is about 9 km from Siena.
