= Costafabbri =

- Frazione
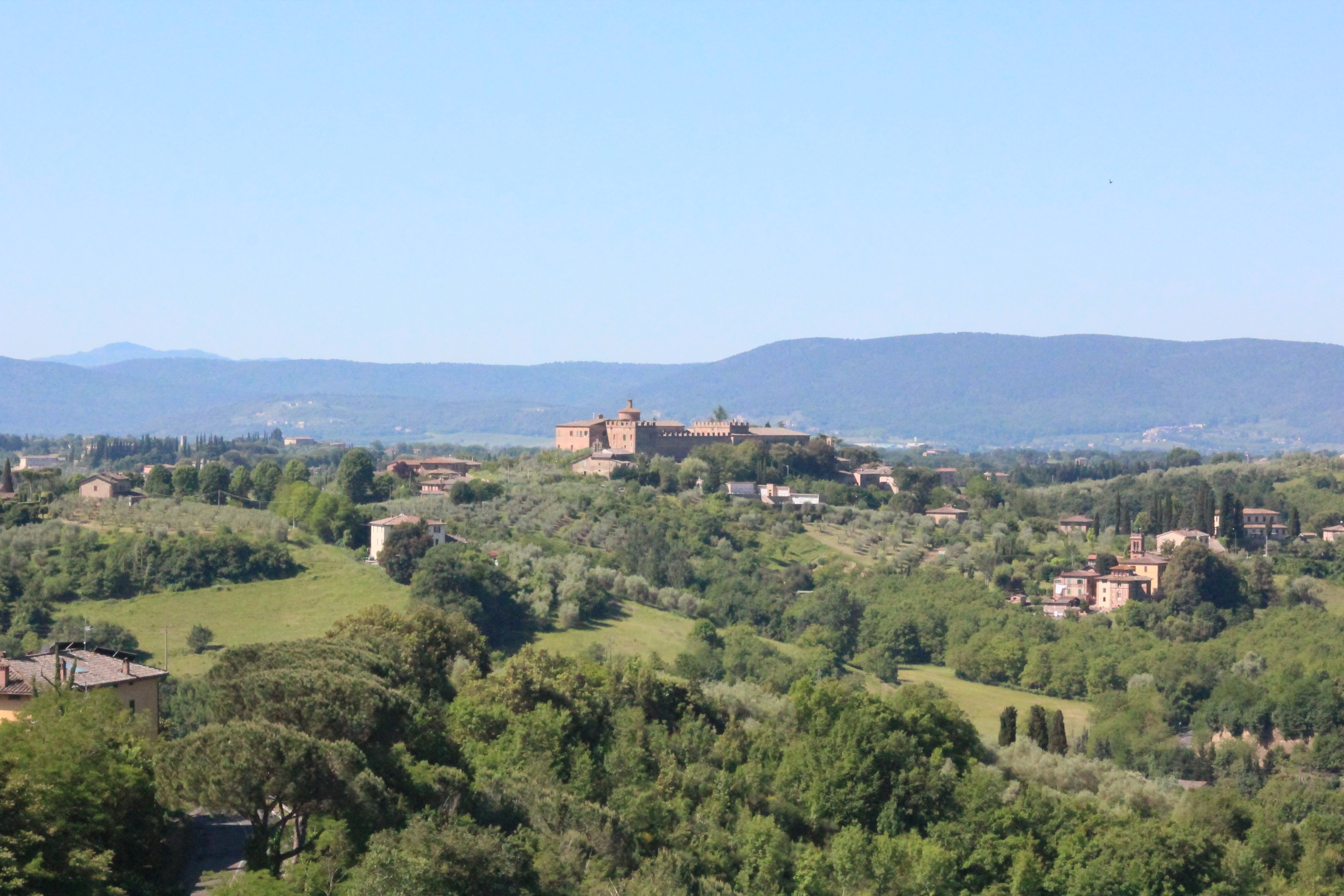
- View of the monastery of Sant'Eugenio in Costafabbri

- Location of Costafabbri in Italy
- Coordinates: 43°18′00″N 11°18′48″E
- Country: Italy
- Region: Tuscany
- Province: Siena (SI)
- Comune: Siena
- Elevation: 262 m (860 ft)
- Time zone: UTC+1 (CET)
  - Summer (DST): UTC+2 (CEST)

Costafabbri is a village in Tuscany, central Italy, in the comune of Siena, province of Siena.

Costafabbri is about 3 km from Siena.

== Bibliography ==
- Emanuele Repetti (1839). "Costafabbri". Dizionario geografico fisico storico della Toscana. Vol. 2. Florence. p. 77.
