= Siena =

Comune in Tuscany, Italy

- Comune
- Comune di Siena
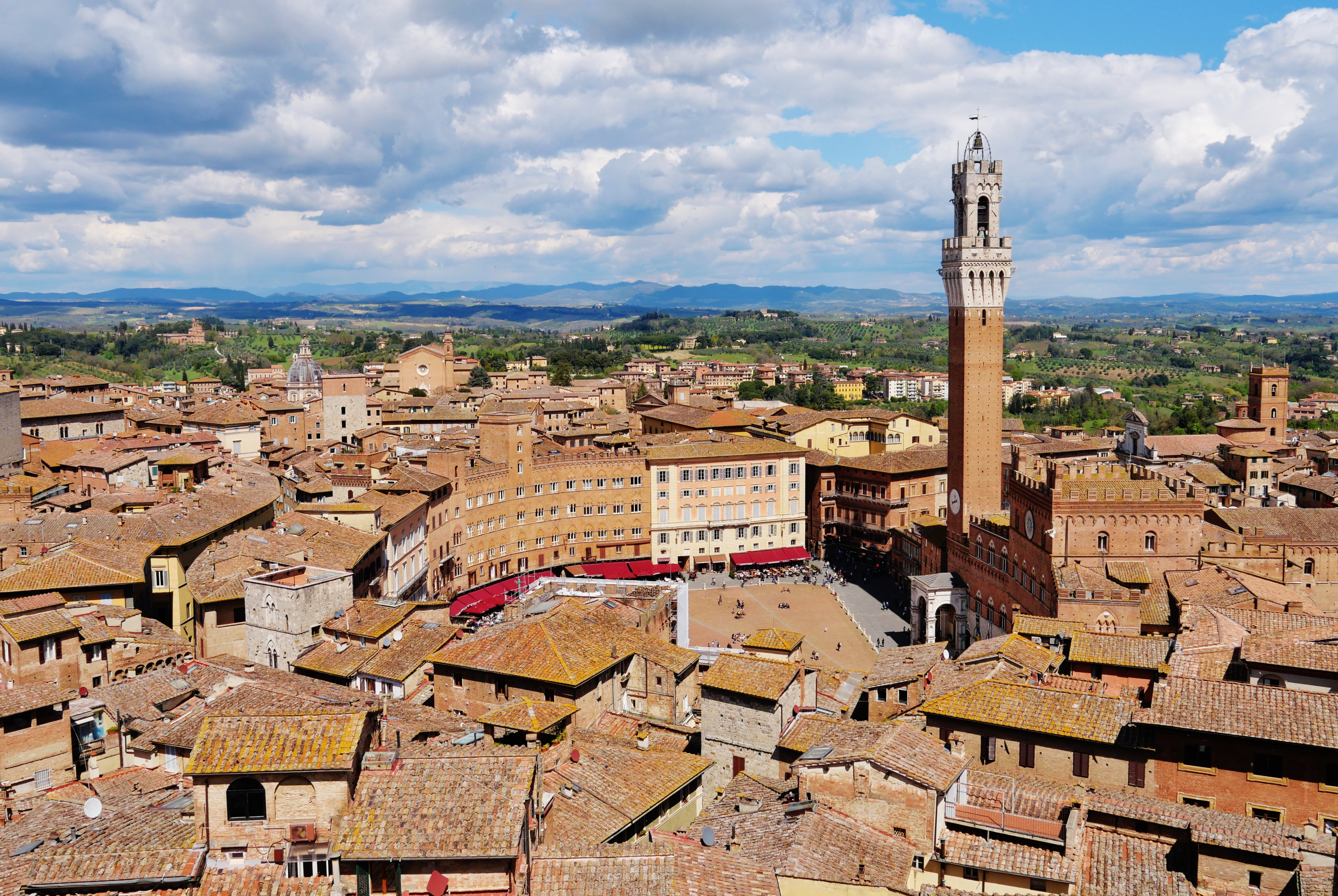
- View of Piazza del Campo (Campo Square), the Mangia Tower (Torre del Mangia) and Santa Maria in Provenzano Church

- Flag Coat of arms

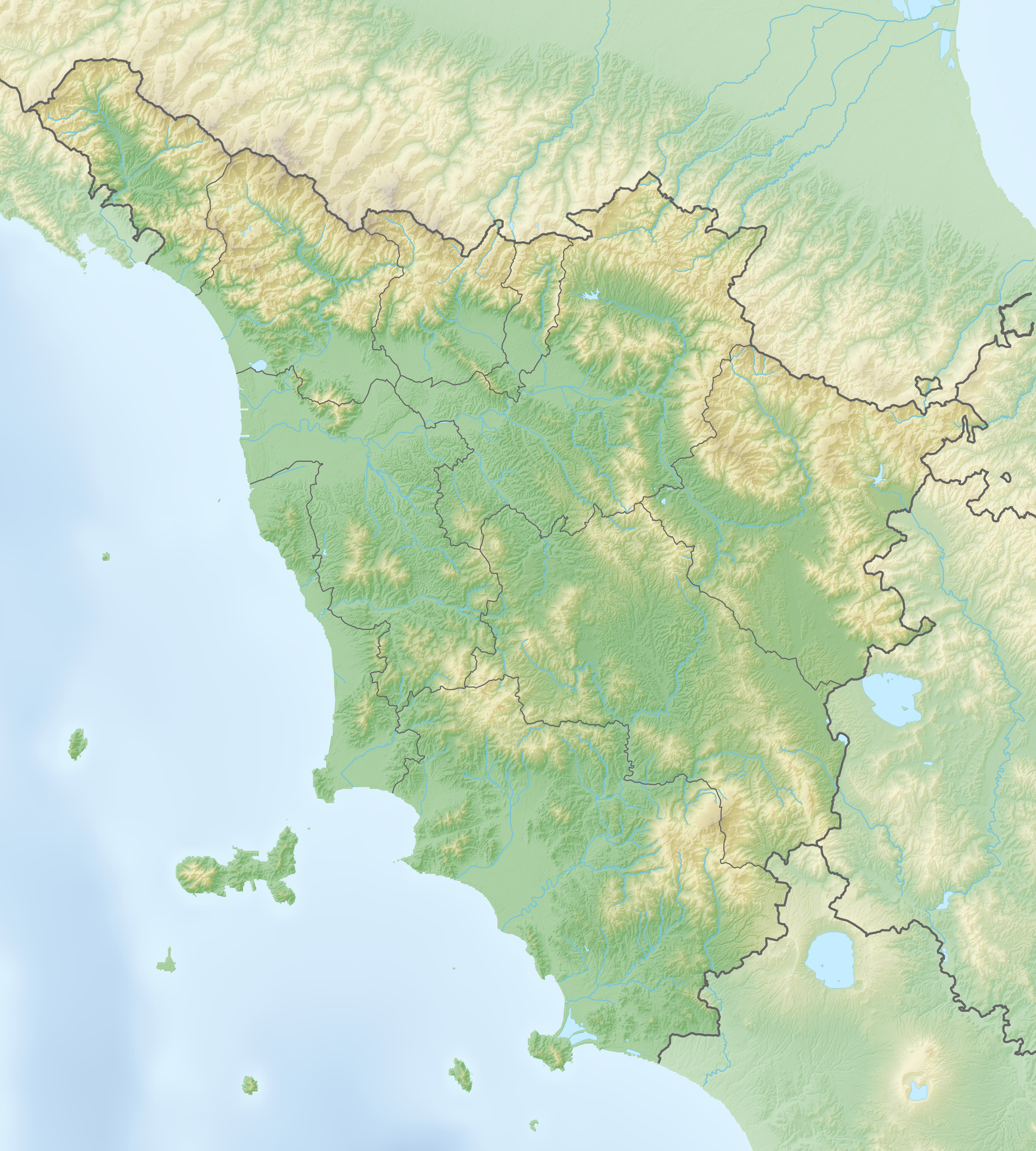
- Location within Italy Location within Tuscany Location within Europe
- Coordinates: (53893) 43°19′07″N 11°19′50″E
- Country: Italy
- Region: Tuscany
- Province: Siena (SI)
- Frazioni: Abbadia, Agostoli, Bolgione, Colle Malamerenda, Costafabbri, Costalpino, Fogliano, Ginestreto, Isola d'Arbia, Le Tolfe, Monteliscai, Pieve a Bozzone, Presciano, Sant'Andrea a Montecchio, Santa Regina, Taverne d'Arbia, Val di Pugna, Vico d'Arbia, Vignano, Volte Alte

Government
  - Mayor: Nicoletta Fabio (centre-right)

Area
  - Total: 118.53 km^{2} (45.76 sq mi)
- Elevation: 322 m (1,056 ft)

Population (2026)
  - Total: 53,180
  - Density: 448.7/km^{2} (1,162/sq mi)
- Demonym: Senese
- Time zone: UTC+1 (CET)
  - Summer (DST): UTC+2 (CEST)
- Postal code: 53100, 53010
- Dialing code: 0577
- Patron saint: St. Ansanus
- Saint day: 1 December
- Website: www.comune.siena.it

UNESCO World Heritage Site
- Official name: "Historic Centre of Siena"
- Criteria: Cultural: (i)(ii)(iv)
- Reference: 717
- Inscription: 1995 (19th Session)
- Area: 170 ha (420 acres)
- Buffer zone: 9,907 ha (24,480 acres)

Siena (/siˈɛnə/ see-EN-ə, Italian: [ˈsjɛːna, ˈsjeːna]; traditionally spelled Sienna in English; Latin: Saena Iulia) is a city in the region of Tuscany in central Italy, and the capital of the province of Siena. With a population of 53,180, it is the 12th-largest city in the region.

The city is historically linked to commercial and banking activities, having been a major banking centre until the 13th and 14th centuries. Siena is also home to the oldest bank in the world, the Monte dei Paschi, which has been operating continuously since 1472 (554 years ago). Several significant Mediaeval and Renaissance painters were born and worked in Siena, including Duccio di Buoninsegna, Ambrogio Lorenzetti, Simone Martini and Sassetta, and they influenced the course of Italian and European art. The University of Siena, originally called Studium Senese, was founded in 1240, making it one of the oldest universities in continuous operation in the world.

Siena was an important city in medieval Europe, and its historic centre is a UNESCO World Heritage Site, which contains several buildings from the 13th and 14th centuries. The city is famous for its cuisine, art, museums, medieval cityscape and the Palio, a horse race held twice a year in Piazza del Campo.

In October 2025, Siena won the European Green Leaf Award for 2027.

== History ==
=== Antiquity ===
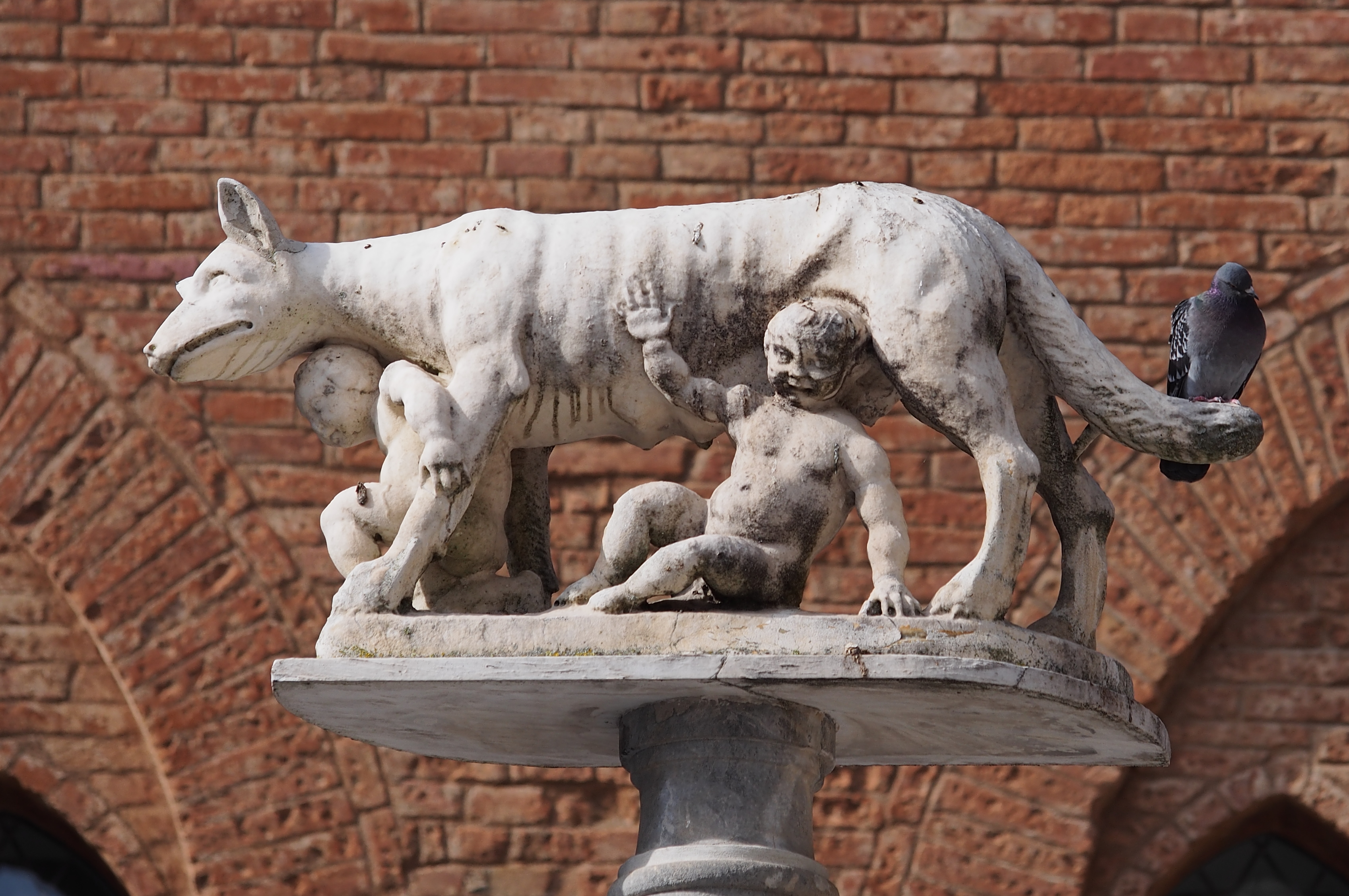
Capitoline Wolf at Siena Duomo. According to a legend, Siena was founded by Senius and Aschius, two sons of Remus. When they fled Rome, they took the statue of the She-wolf to Siena, which became a symbol of the town.

Siena, like other Tuscan hill towns, was first settled in the time of the Etruscans (c. 900–400 BC) when it was inhabited by a tribe called the Saina. A Roman town called Saena Iulia was founded at the site in the time of the Emperor Augustus.

According to local legend, Siena was founded by Senius and Aschius, two sons of Remus and thus nephews of Romulus, after whom Rome was named. Supposedly after their father's murder by Romulus, they fled Rome, taking with them the statue of the she-wolf suckling the infants (Capitoline Wolf), thus appropriating that symbol for the town. Additionally they rode white and black horses, giving rise to the Balzana, or coat of arms of Siena with a white band atop a dark band. Some claim the name Siena derives from Senius. Other etymologies derive the name from the Etruscan family name Saina, the Roman family name Saenii, or the Latin word senex "old" or its derived form seneo "to be old".

The first known document of the Sienese community dates back to 70 AD: the Roman Senator Manlio Patruito reported to Rome that he had been ridiculed with a fake funeral during his official visit to Saena Iulia, a small military colony in Tuscia. The Roman Senate decided to punish the main culprits and to severely call the Sienese to greater respect for Roman authority.

At the end of the third century the city was Christianised by Sant'Ansano, known as the "Baptist of the Sienese", who was punished by the Roman authorities governing Siena with the test of fire and boiling oil, imprisonment and finally beheading. During the Middle Ages he was therefore named patron saint of Siena, and the day of his liturgical anniversary came to mark the beginning of the "Contrada Year".

=== Middle Ages ===
Feudal power waned, however, and by the death of Countess Matilda in 1115 the border territory of the March of Tuscany which had been under the control of her family, the Canossa, broke up into several autonomous regions. This ultimately resulted in the creation of the Republic of Siena.

The Republic existed for over four hundred years, from the 12th century until 1555. During the golden age of Siena before the Black Death in 1348, the city was home to 50,000 people. A major economic centre and among the most important cities in Europe, as well as the main political, economic, and artistic rival of its neighboring city of Florence.

=== Medicean period ===
After the fall of the Republic, a few Sienese led by the Florentine exile Piero Strozzi, not wanting to accept the fall of the Republic, took refuge in Montalcino, creating the Republic of Siena sheltered in Montalcino. It survived until 31 May 1559 when it was betrayed by the French allies, whom Siena had always supported, concluding with the Peace of Cateau-Cambrésis with Charles V, which effectively ceded the Republic to the Medici.

The Academy of Sciences (Accademia de'Fisiocritici) was formed in Siena in 1691, by Pirro Maria Gabrielli.

The House of Medici, apart from the brief parenthesis of Ferdinando I, who tried to create an organised state, were not able to give a stable structure to the Grand Duchy of Tuscany, keeping almost unchanged the division between the so-called Old State, i.e. Florence, and the New State, i.e. Siena and the southern part up to Pitigliano, with different laws and taxes. With the death of Gian Gastone de' Medici, (1737), who had no children, the Medici dynasty ended and the Grand Duchy passed into the hands of the Habsburg-Lorraine dynasty who kept it until 1799.

=== Late modern period ===
After the Napoleonic period and the Risorgimento uprisings, Siena was the first city in Tuscany, in 1859, to vote in favor of annexation to the Kingdom of Italy. During the smallpox epidemic, Siena was an early adaptor of innocculation.

In 1966, Siena became the first European city to ban cars from its main square.

In 2025, a bidding war began for the Banca Monte dei Paschi di Siena.

== Geography ==
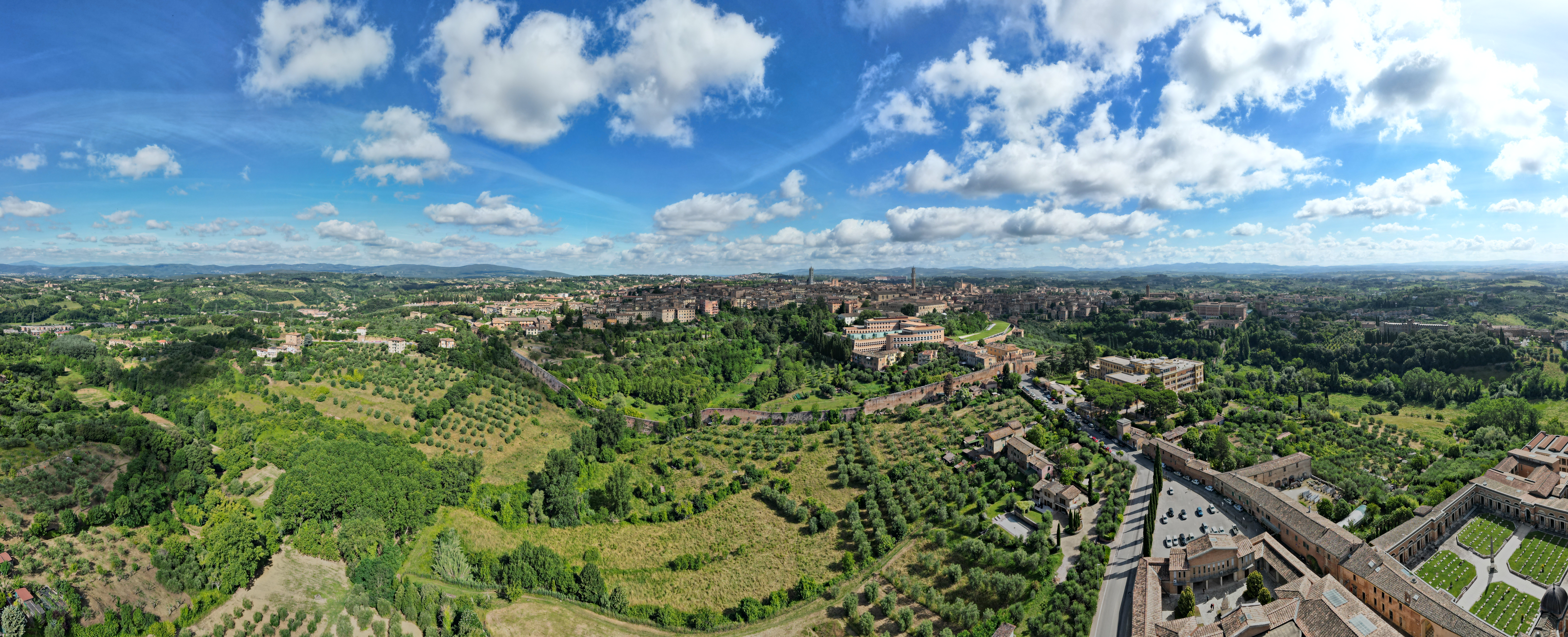
Siena aerial panorama. June 2024.

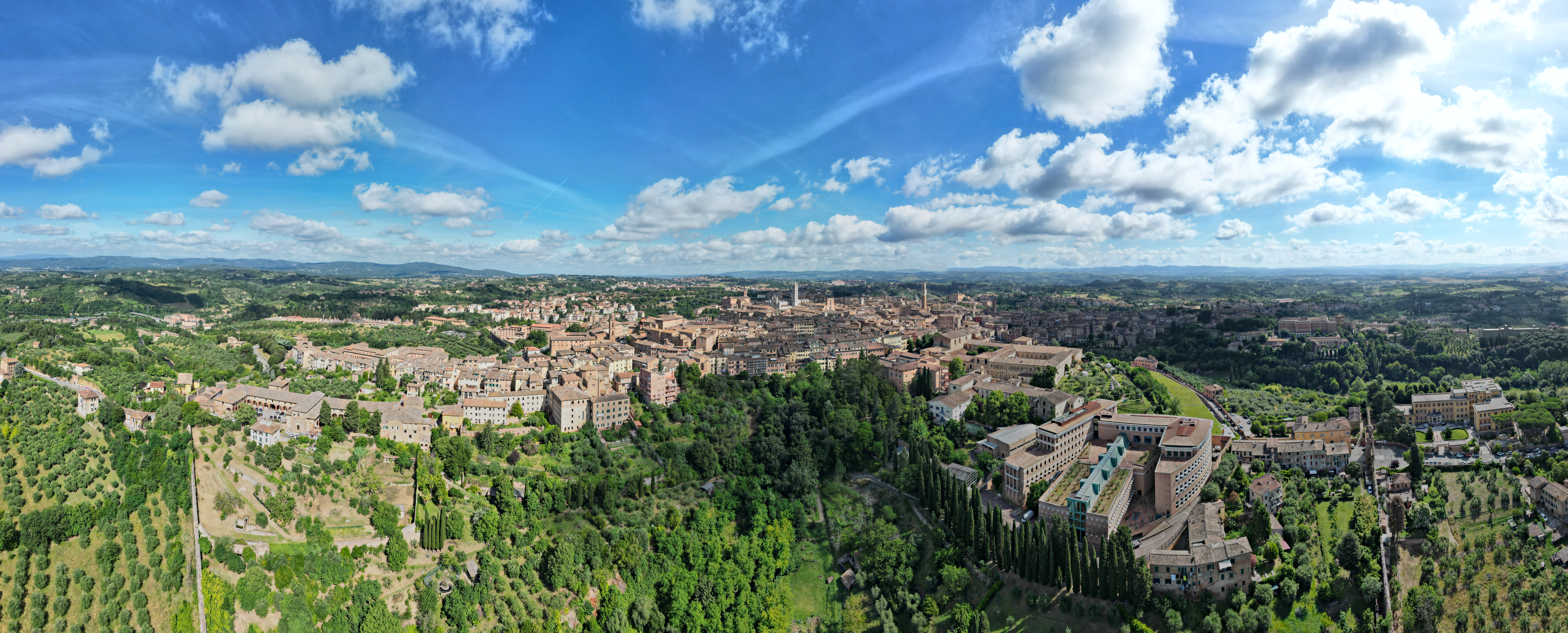
Siena aerial panorama. June 2024.

Siena is located in the central part of Tuscany, in the middle of a vast hilly landscape between the Arbia river valley (south), the Merse valley (south-west), the Elsa valley (north), the Chianti hills (north-east), the Montagnola Senese (west) and the Crete Senesi (south-east). The city lies at 322 m (1,056 ft) above sea level.

=== Climate ===
Siena has a typical inland Mediterranean climate. Average rainfall is 823 mm (32.4 in), with the maximum in November and the minimum in July. August is the hottest month, with an average temperature of 24.4 °C (75.9 °F), and January the coldest, with an average temperature of 6.4 °C (43.5 °F).

The hottest temperature ever recorded was 39.6 °C (103.3 °F) in August 2017. On average, 10 days per year exceed 34 °C (93.2 °F).

Climate data for Siena (1991–2020 normals, extremes 1962–present)
Month	Jan	Feb	Mar	Apr	May	Jun	Jul	Aug	Sep	Oct	Nov	Dec	Year
Record high °C (°F)	18.4 (65.1)	23.5 (74.3)	24.8 (76.6)	29.1 (84.4)	33.5 (92.3)	38.4 (101.1)	39.0 (102.2)	39.6 (103.3)	35.6 (96.1)	30.9 (87.6)	23.3 (73.9)	19.3 (66.7)	39.6 (103.3)
Mean daily maximum °C (°F)	9.8 (49.6)	11.0 (51.8)	14.6 (58.3)	18.1 (64.6)	22.7 (72.9)	27.1 (80.8)	30.5 (86.9)	30.7 (87.3)	25.0 (77.0)	19.8 (67.6)	14.2 (57.6)	10.3 (50.5)	19.5 (67.1)
Daily mean °C (°F)	6.4 (43.5)	7.0 (44.6)	9.9 (49.8)	13.0 (55.4)	17.1 (62.8)	21.1 (70.0)	24.1 (75.4)	24.4 (75.9)	19.7 (67.5)	15.5 (59.9)	10.7 (51.3)	7.1 (44.8)	14.7 (58.4)
Mean daily minimum °C (°F)	3.1 (37.6)	3.0 (37.4)	5.3 (41.5)	7.9 (46.2)	11.6 (52.9)	15.2 (59.4)	17.7 (63.9)	18.0 (64.4)	14.4 (57.9)	11.1 (52.0)	7.2 (45.0)	3.9 (39.0)	9.9 (49.8)
Record low °C (°F)	−9.7 (14.5)	−11.1 (12.0)	−6.2 (20.8)	−1.0 (30.2)	3.0 (37.4)	6.8 (44.2)	8.6 (47.5)	10.2 (50.4)	6.7 (44.1)	1.2 (34.2)	−5.2 (22.6)	−7.9 (17.8)	−11.1 (12.0)
Average precipitation mm (inches)	53 (2.1)	61 (2.4)	59 (2.3)	71 (2.8)	70 (2.8)	52 (2.0)	29 (1.1)	39 (1.5)	81 (3.2)	106 (4.2)	125 (4.9)	77 (3.0)	823 (32.3)
Average precipitation days (≥ 1.0 mm)	7.0	6.6	7.5	8.1	8.2	5.9	3.4	3.9	6.7	8.1	10.0	8.8	84.2
Source 1: Consorzio LaMMA
Source 2: Temperature estreme in Toscana

== Government ==
=== Subdivisions ===
Within Siena's historic center, three main districts, known as the Terzi, can be identified: Terzo di Città, Terzo di San Martino, and Terzo di Camollia. These Terzi are further divided into Contrade, totaling 17, which compete against each other during the Palio di Siena.

Outside the city walls, new suburbs and neighborhoods began to develop from the early 20th century onward. Initially, extramural suburbs grew spontaneously just beyond the walls, later followed by neighborhoods designed according to rational urban planning principles. The main neighborhoods are:

- Acquacalda
- Bottega Nuova
- Camollia
- Cappuccini
- Coroncina
- Due Ponti
- Fontegiusta
- Marciano
- Petriccio
- Pispini
- Ravacciano
- Romana
- Ruffolo
- San Marco
- San Miniato
- San Prospero
- Scacciapensieri
- Tufi
- Valli
- Vico Alto

== Demographics ==
Historical population
Year	Pop.	±%
1861	32,108	—
1871	31,844	−0.8%
1881	34,071	+7.0%
1901	37,623	+10.4%
1911	41,363	+9.9%
1921	42,930	+3.8%
1931	45,995	+7.1%
1936	48,664	+5.8%
1951	52,566	+8.0%
1961	61,453	+16.9%
1971	65,634	+6.8%
1981	61,989	−5.6%
1991	56,956	−8.1%
2001	52,625	−7.6%
2011	52,839	+0.4%
2021	53,062	+0.4%
Source: ISTAT

As of 2026, the population is 53,180, of which 46.8% are male, and 53.2% are female. Minors make up 12.9% of the population, and seniors make up 28.5%.

=== Immigration ===
As of 2025, immigrants make up 14.1% of the population. The 5 largest foreign countries of birth are Albania, Romania, Ukraine, Pakistan, and Peru.

Foreign population by country of birth (2025)
Country of birth	Population
Albania	795
Romania	689
Ukraine	397
Pakistan	367
Peru	346
Moldova	266
Kosovo	232
Iran	214
Colombia	182
Bangladesh	179
China	163
Sri Lanka	158
Russia	153
Poland	152
Brazil	145

== Economy ==
The main activities are tourism, services, agriculture, handicrafts and light industry.

In 2009 agricultural activity comprised 919 companies with a total area of 10.755 square kilometres (4.153 mi^{2}) for a usable agricultural area of 6.954 square kilometres (2.685 mi^{2}) or about 1/30 of the total municipal area (data ISTAT for the 2000 Agriculture Census V).

There is little manufacturing in the city. One exception is the seasonal confectionery industry, which produces local specialities including panforte, ricciarelli and cavallucci at Christmas, and pane co' santi for I Santi on 1 November and I Morti on the following day.

The area has also seen a growth in biotechnology. The Centenary Institute Sieroterapico Achille Sclavo used to be Swiss-owned, operating under the company name, Novartis Vaccines. Novartis developed and produced vaccines and employed about a thousand people. In 2015, the research plant in Siena became part of Glaxo Smith Kline, as part of a deal between Novartis and this firm.

== Culture ==
=== Contrade ===
Siena retains a ward-centric culture from medieval times. Each ward (contrada) is represented by an animal or mascot and has its own boundary and distinct identity. Ward rivalries are most rampant during the annual horse race (Palio) in the Piazza del Campo. There are 17 wards (contrada): Aquila, Bruco, Chiocciola, Civetta, Drago, Giraffa, Istrice, Leocorno, Lupa, Nicchio, Oca, Onda, Pantera, Selva, Tartuca, Torre, Valdimontone.

=== The Palio ===
The Palio di Siena is a traditional medieval horse race run around the Piazza del Campo twice each year, on 2 July and 16 August. The event is attended by large crowds, and is widely televised. Ten randomly selected from 17 Contrade (which are city neighbourhoods originally formed as battalions for the city's defence) vie for the trophy: a painted banner, or Palio bearing an image of the Blessed Virgin Mary.

=== Art ===
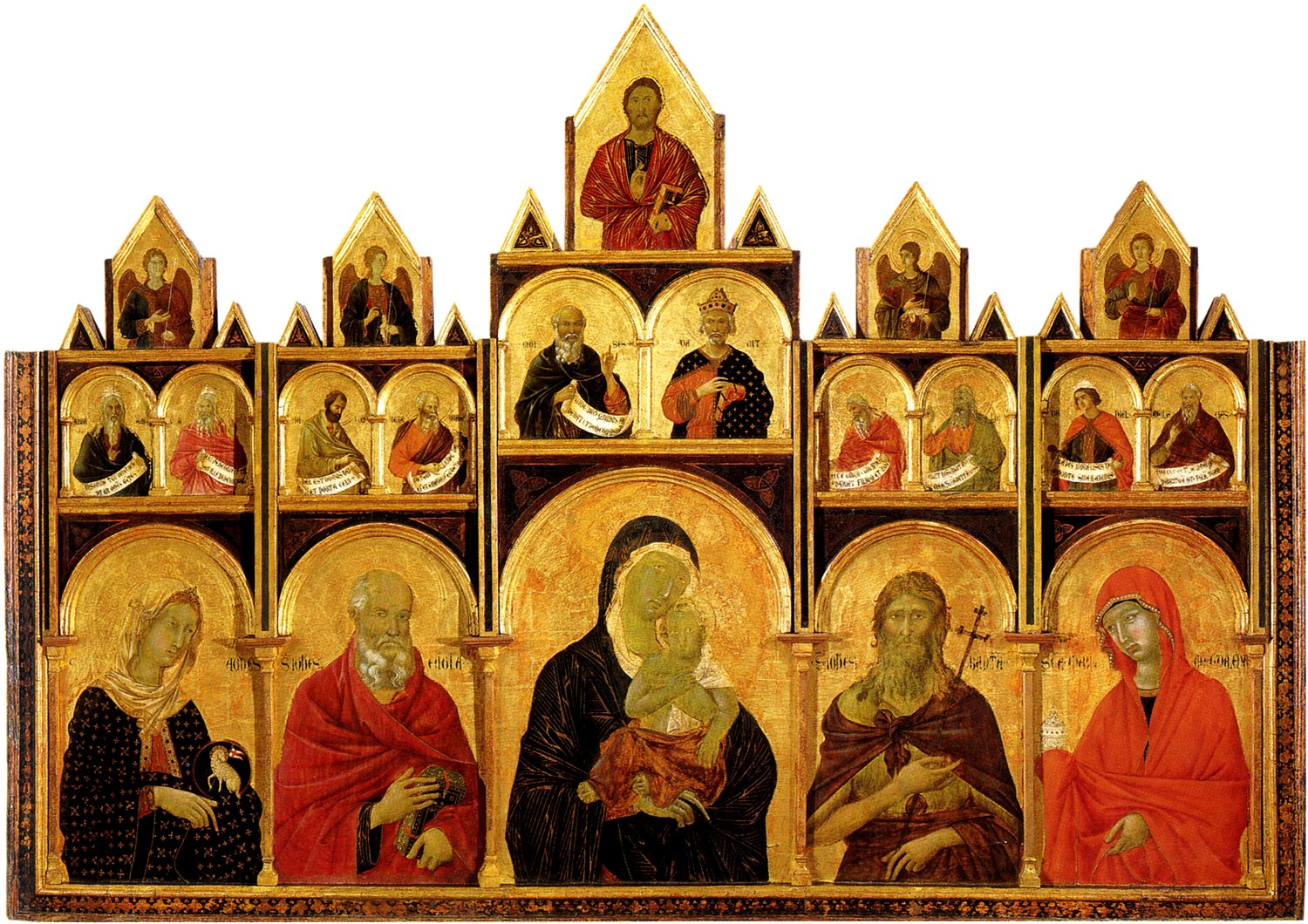
Madonna and Child with saints polyptych by Duccio (1311–18)

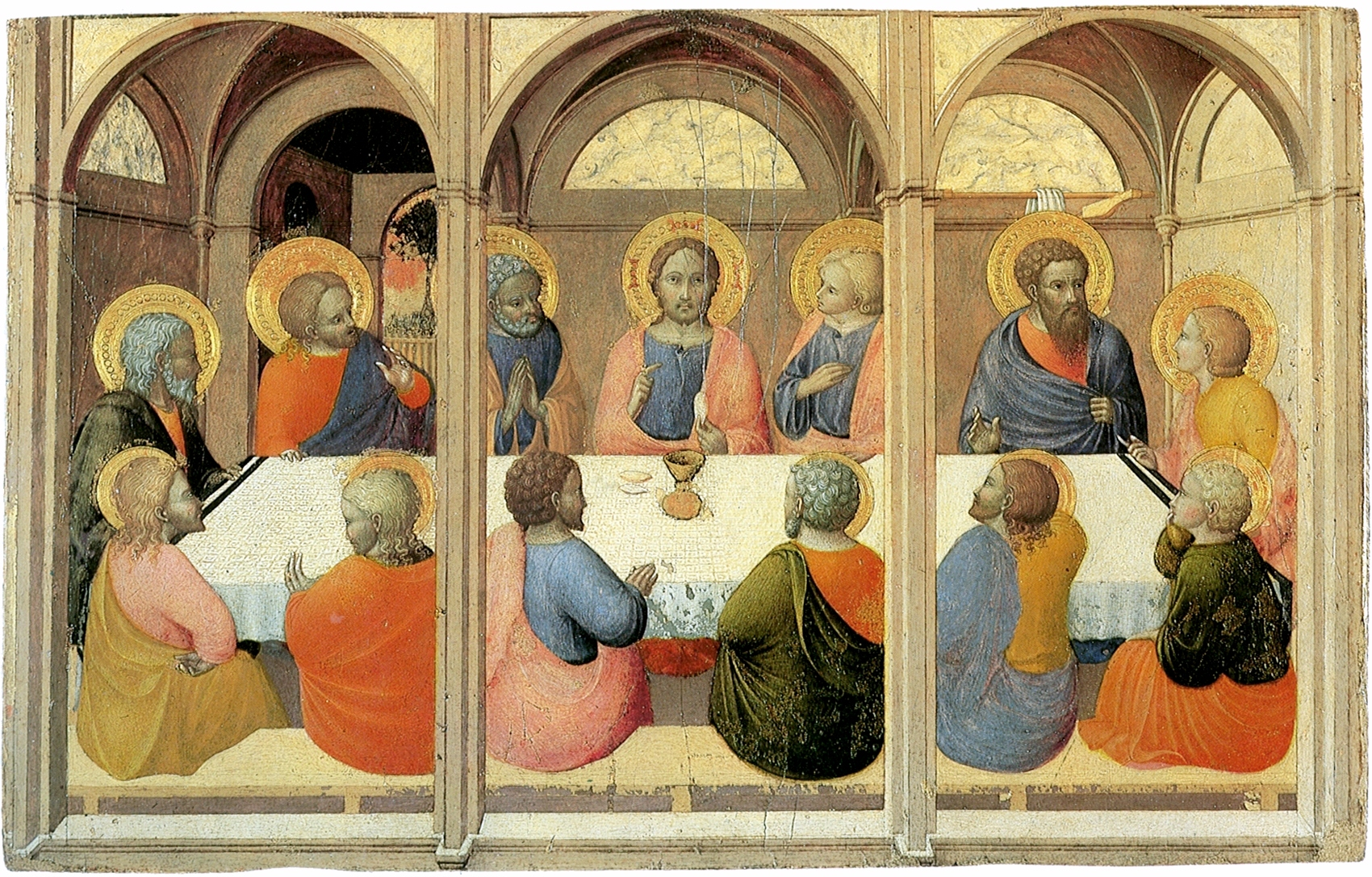
Sassetta, Institution of the Eucharist (1430–32), Pinacoteca di Siena

Over the centuries, Siena has had a rich tradition of arts and artists. The list of artists from the Sienese School include Duccio and his student Simone Martini, the brothers Pietro Lorenzetti and Ambrogio Lorenzetti, and Martino di Bartolomeo. A number of well-known works of Renaissance and High Renaissance art still remain in galleries or churches in Siena. In 2024 and 2025, an exhibit entitled Siena: The Rise of Painting, 1300–1350, was held in the Metropolitan Museum of Art in New York and the National Gallery in London. From October 2026 to January 2027, the Frick Collection in New York has an exhibition titled "Siena: The Art of Bronze, 1450–1500".

The Church of San Domenico contains art by Guido da Siena, dating to the mid-13th century. Duccio's Maestà, which was commissioned by the City of Siena in 1308, was instrumental in leading Italian painting away from the hieratic representations of Byzantine art and directing it toward more direct presentations of reality. And his Madonna and Child with Saints polyptych, painted between 1311 and 1318, remains at the city's Pinacoteca Nazionale.

The Pinacoteca also includes several works by Domenico Beccafumi, as well as art by Lorenzo Lotto, Domenico di Bartolo and Fra Bartolomeo.

== Main sights ==
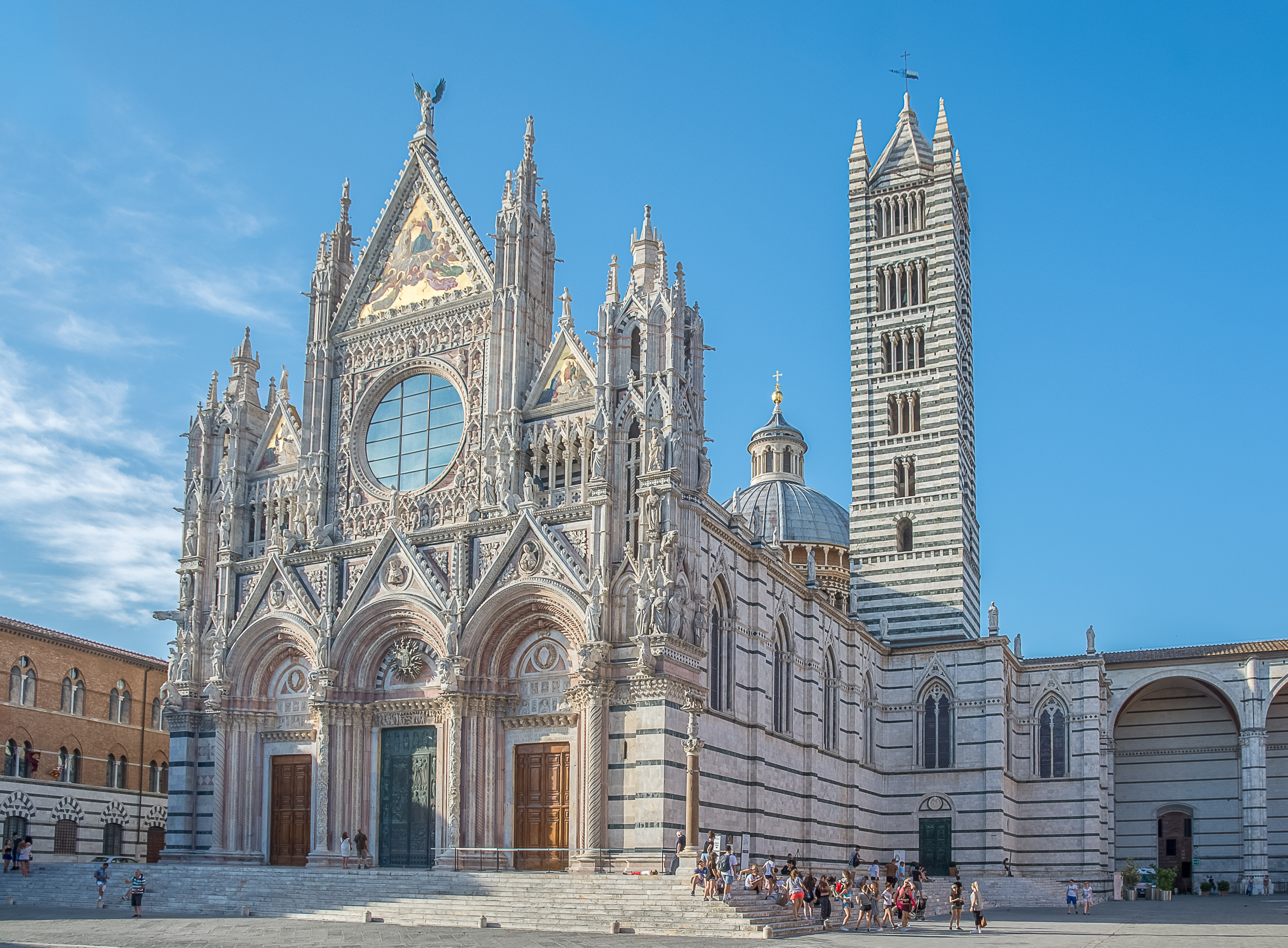
Siena Cathedral

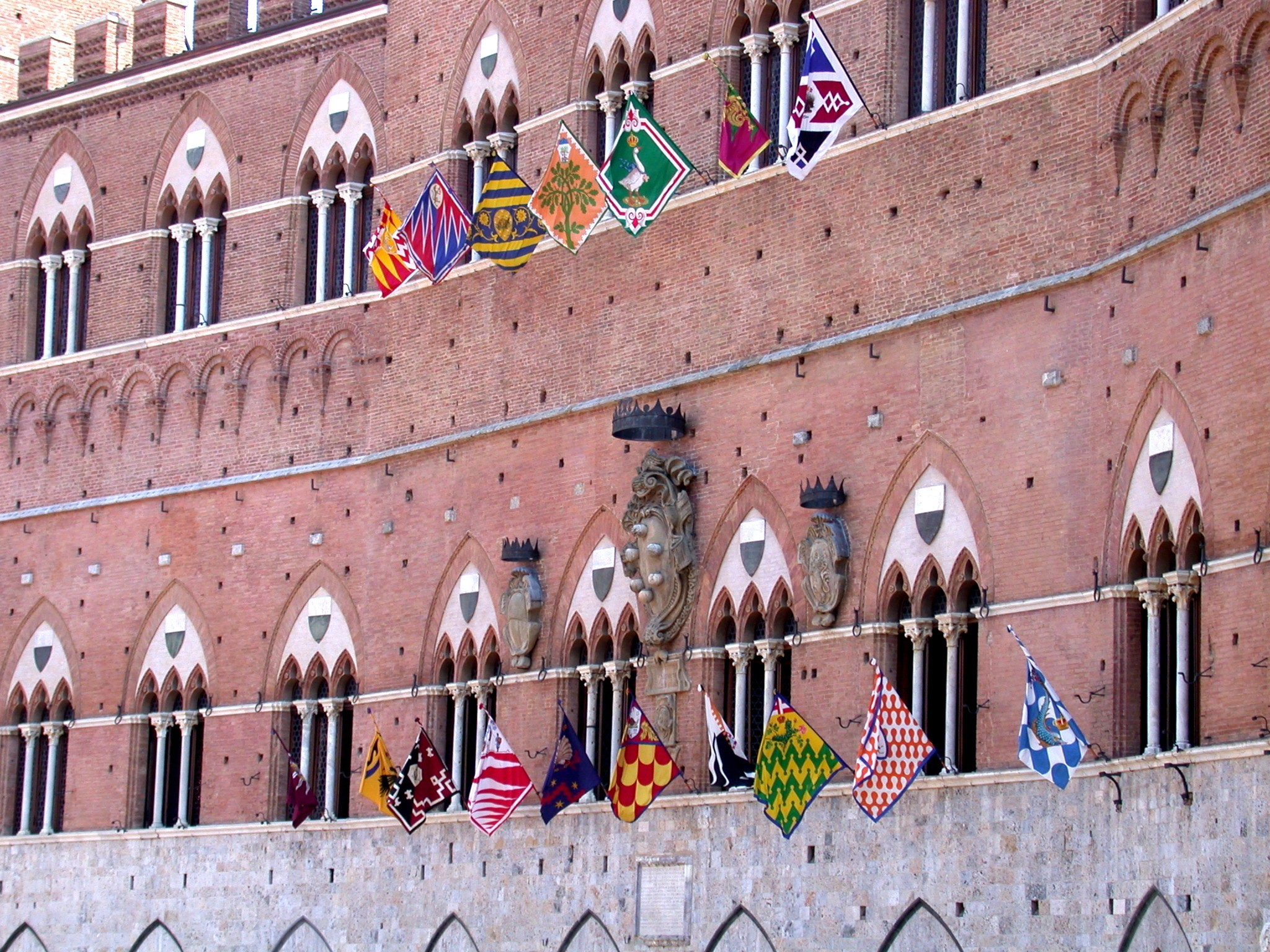
Façade of the Palazzo Pubblico (town hall) during the Palio days

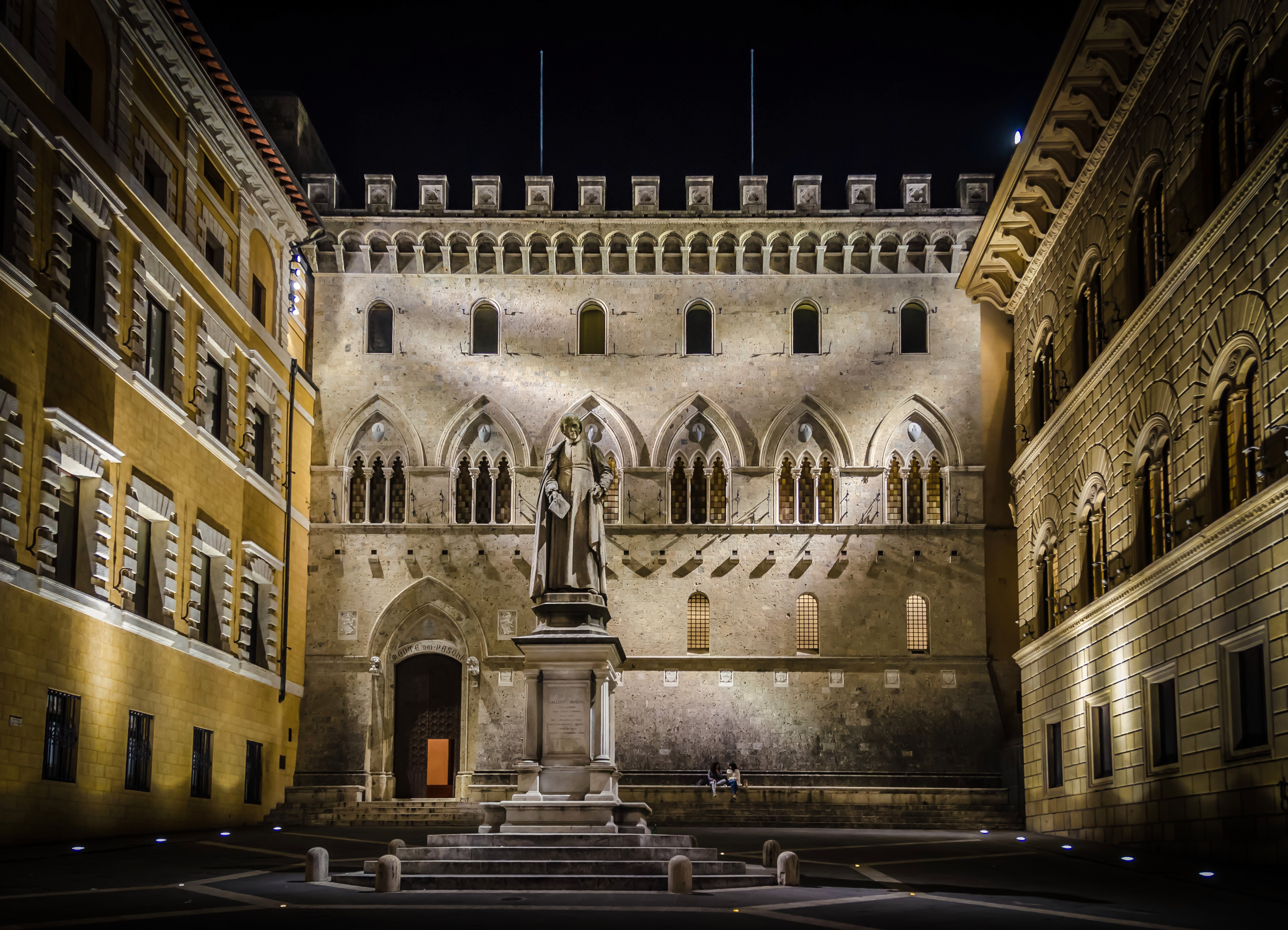
Piazza Salimbeni

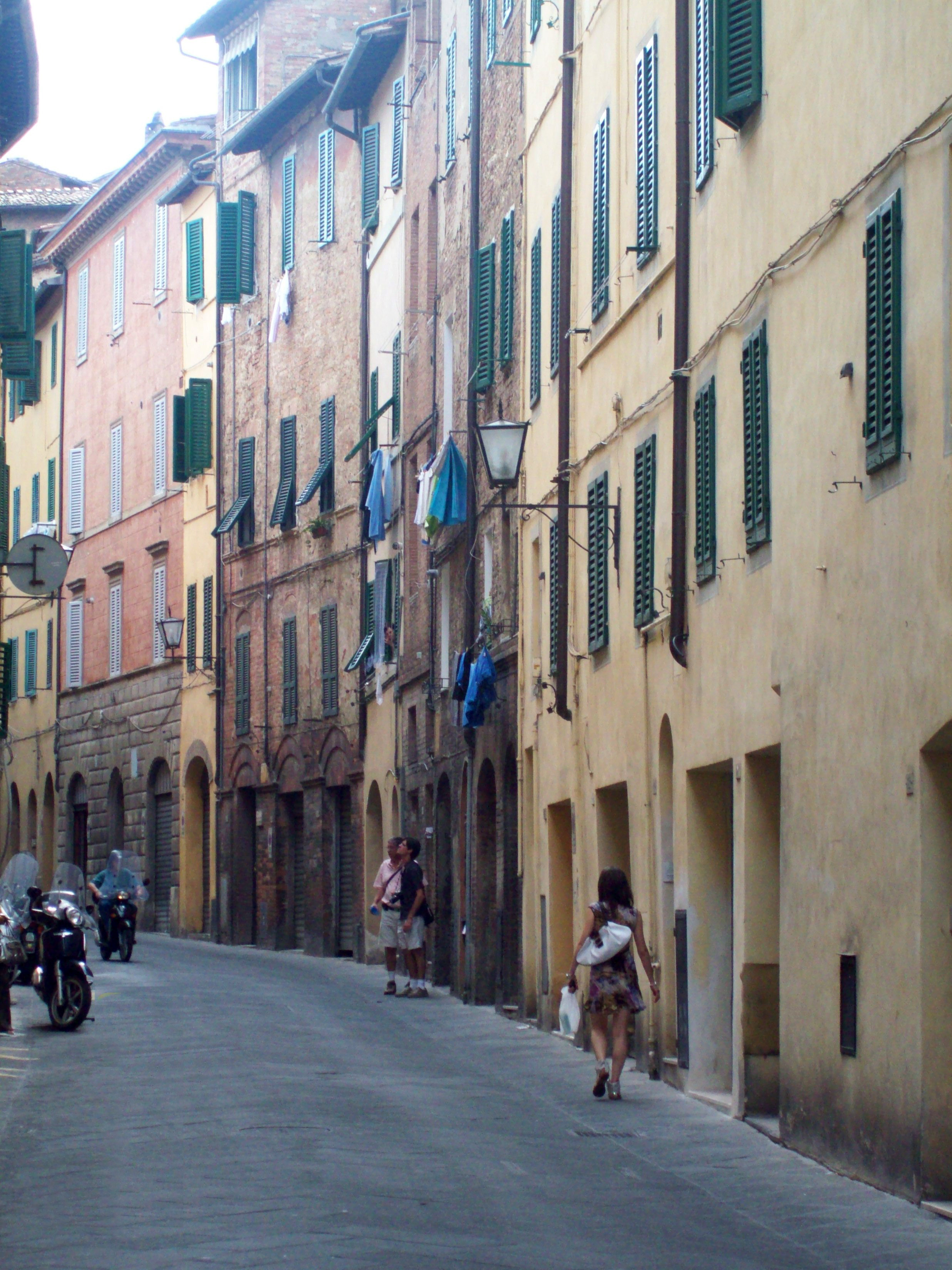
Streets of old Siena

The Siena Cathedral (Duomo), begun in the 12th century, is a masterpiece of Italian Romanesque–Gothic architecture. Its main façade was completed in 1380 with a nave oriented northeast–southwest. A proposed expansion of the eastern transept would have transformed the church into an ambitiously massive basilica, the largest then in the world, with an east–west nave. However, the scarcity of funds, in part due to war and the Black Death, truncated the project. Two walls of this expanded eastern transept remain; through an internal staircase, visitors can climb for a grand view of the city.

The Siena Cathedral Pulpit is an octagonal 13th-century masterpiece sculpted by Nicola Pisano with lion pedestals and biblical bas-relief panels. The inlaid marble mosaic floor of the cathedral, designed and laboured on by many artists, is among the most elaborate in Italy. The Sacristy and Piccolomini library have well-preserved Renaissance frescos by Ghirlandaio and Pinturicchio respectively. Other sculptors active in the church and in the subterranean baptistry are Donatello, Lorenzo Ghiberti, Jacopo della Quercia and others. The Museo dell'Opera del Duomo contains Duccio's famous Maestà (1308–11) and various other works by Sienese masters. More Sienese paintings are to be found in the Pinacoteca, e.g. 13th-century works by Dietisalvi di Speme.

The Piazza del Campo, the shell-shaped town square, unfurls before the Palazzo Pubblico with its tall Torre del Mangia. This is part of the site for the Palio horse race. The Palazzo Pubblico houses an art museum. Included within the museum is Ambrogio Lorenzetti's frescoes depicting the Allegory and Effects of Good and Bad Government and also some frescoes by Simone Martini and Pietro Lorenzetti.

The Palazzo Salimbeni, located in a piazza of the same name, was the original headquarters and remains in possession of the Monte dei Paschi di Siena, one of the oldest banks in continuous existence in Europe.

Housed in the notable Gothic Palazzo Chigi-Saracini on Via di Città is the Accademia Musicale Chigiana, Siena's conservatory of music.

Other churches in the city include:

- Basilica dell'Osservanza
- San Domenico
- San Francesco
- San Giacinto
- San Martino
- Santa Maria dei Servi
- Santa Petronilla
- Santi Niccolo e Lucia
- Santo Spirito
- Santuccio Church
- Sant'Andrea Apostolo
- Sanctuary of Santa Caterina, incorporating the old house of St. Catherine of Siena. It houses the miraculous Crucifix (late 12th century) from which the saint received her stigmata, and a 15th-century statue of St. Catherine.

The historic Siena synagogue is also preserved and open to visitors.

The city's gardens include the Orto Botanico dell'Università di Siena, a botanical garden maintained by the University of Siena; the 360-hectare Buongoverno park; the Hidden Garden permacultural and accessible design garden, managed by the Siena Art Institute; the OrtoMangione and Ortoaperto community gardens.

The Medicean Fortress:

- Houses the Siena Jazz School, with courses and concerts throughout the year, and a festival during the International Siena Jazz Masterclasses;
- Hosts the Vivi Fortezza Festival, the main summer festival in the Siena city centre, organised by the Pro+ (Propositivo) cultural association;
- Includes an outdoors fitness area open to all, inaugurated in 2016.

In the neighbourhood, there are numerous patrician villas, some of which are attributed to Baldassarre Peruzzi:

- Villa Chigi
- Castle of Belcaro
- Villa Celsa
- Villa Cetinale
- Villa Volte Alte

=== Fountains ===
Medieval public fountains, that are part of the Bottini of Siena aqueducts system, are located throughout the city:

- Fontana di Pantaneto
- Fountain of San Maurizio

== Sports ==
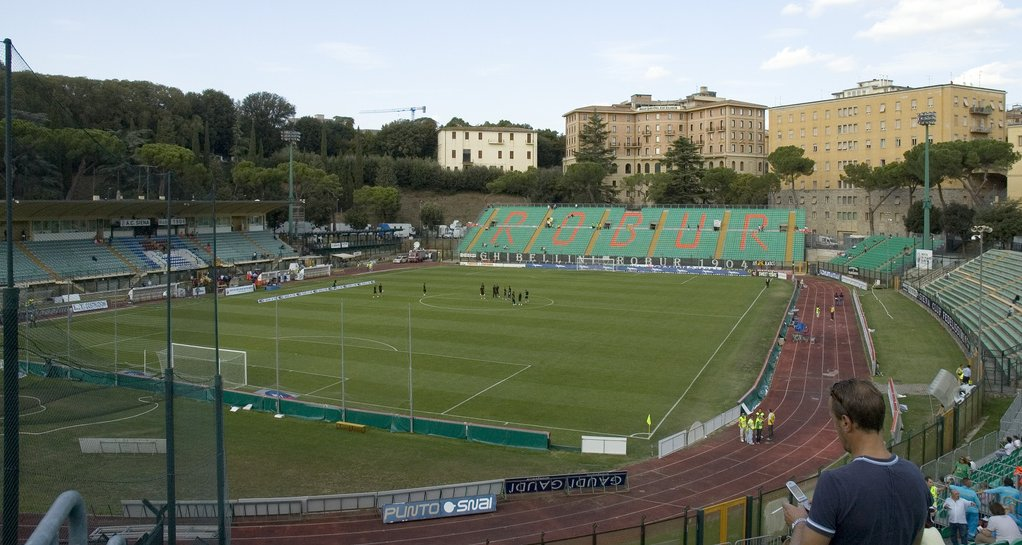
Stadio Artemio Franchi – Montepaschi Arena

=== Cycling ===
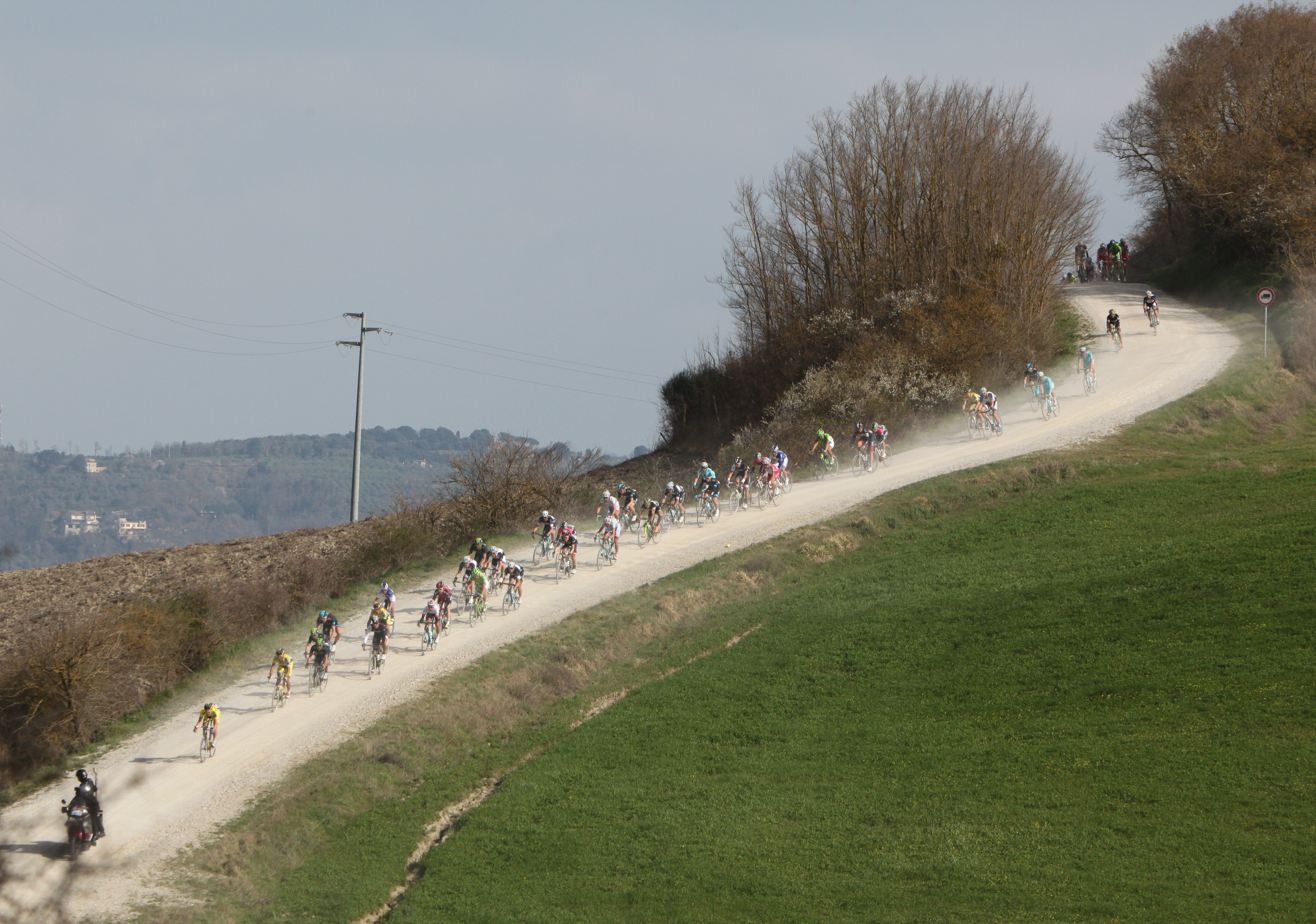
The Strade Bianche cycling race starts and finishes in Siena

Siena hosts the start and finish of the Strade Bianche, a professional cycling race famous for its historic white gravel roads, called strade bianche or sterrati in Italian. More than 50 kilometres (31 miles) of the race is run over dirt roads, usually country lanes and farm tracks twisting through the hills and vineyards of the Chianti region. The finish is on the Piazza del Campo, after a steep and narrow climb on the roughly paved Via Santa Caterina leading into the centre of the medieval city.

== Transport ==
Buses

Siena Mobilità was a consortium established in 2005, formed by Tiemme Toscana Mobilità, Busitalia Sita Nord e ByBus, to manage the local public transport in Siena, in its province and regional service to Florence and Arezzo. From 1 January 2018 Siena Mobilità operated by virtue of the bridge contract between the Regione Toscana and the company ONE Scarl.

Since 1 November 2021 the public local transport is operated by Autolinee Toscane.

Air

The city's nearest airports are Florence Airport, located 81 kilometres (50 mi) north and Rome Fiumicino Airport, located 265 kilometres (165 mi) south east of Siena.

== Twin towns ==
Siena is twinned with:

- Avignon, France
- Concord, North Carolina, US, since 2016
- Weimar, Germany, since 1994
- Wetzlar, Germany, since 1987

== Gallery ==
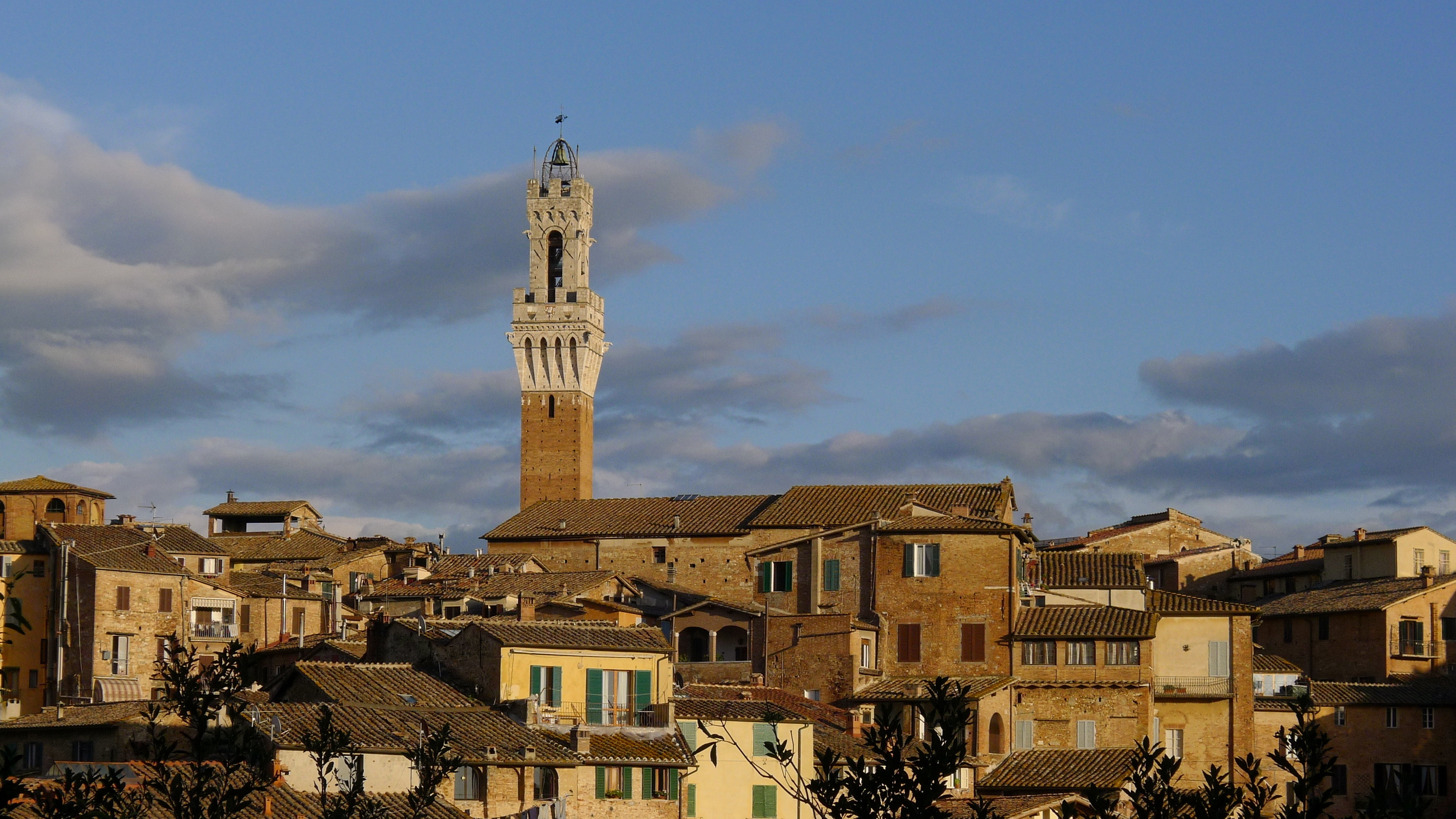
Torre del Mangia (Palazzo Pubblico)

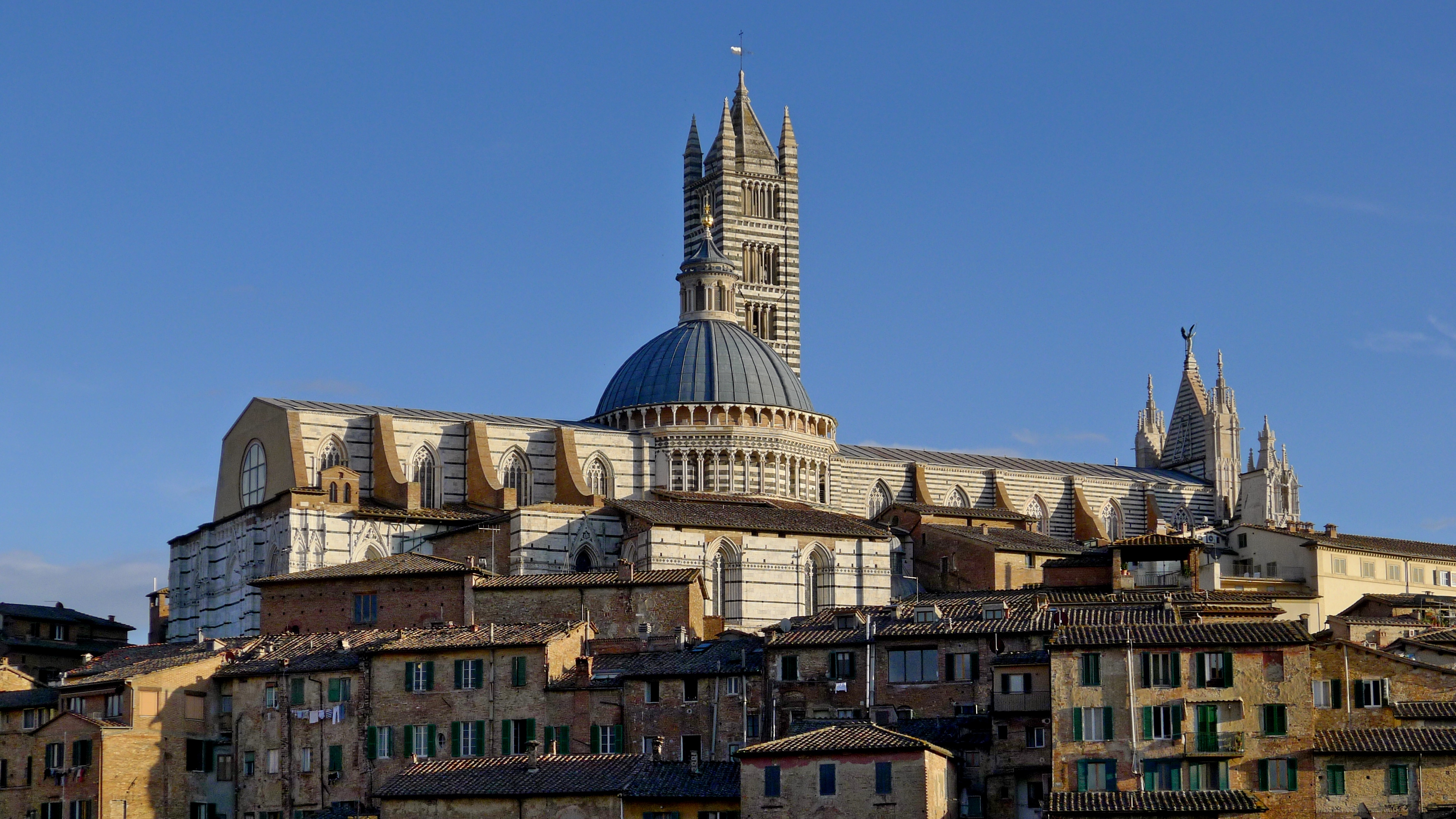
Siena Cathedral (Duomo)

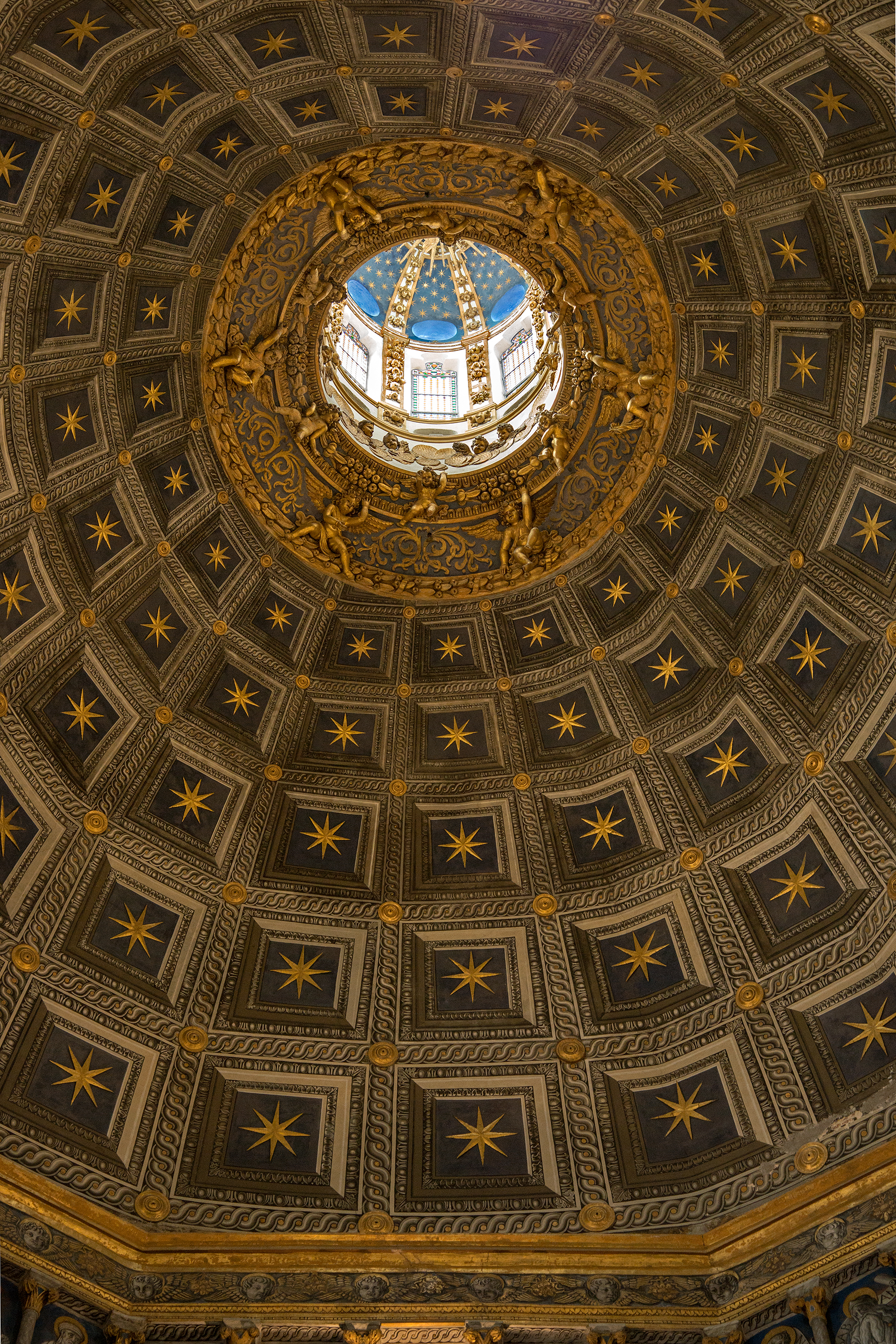
The interior of the dome in Siena Cathedral

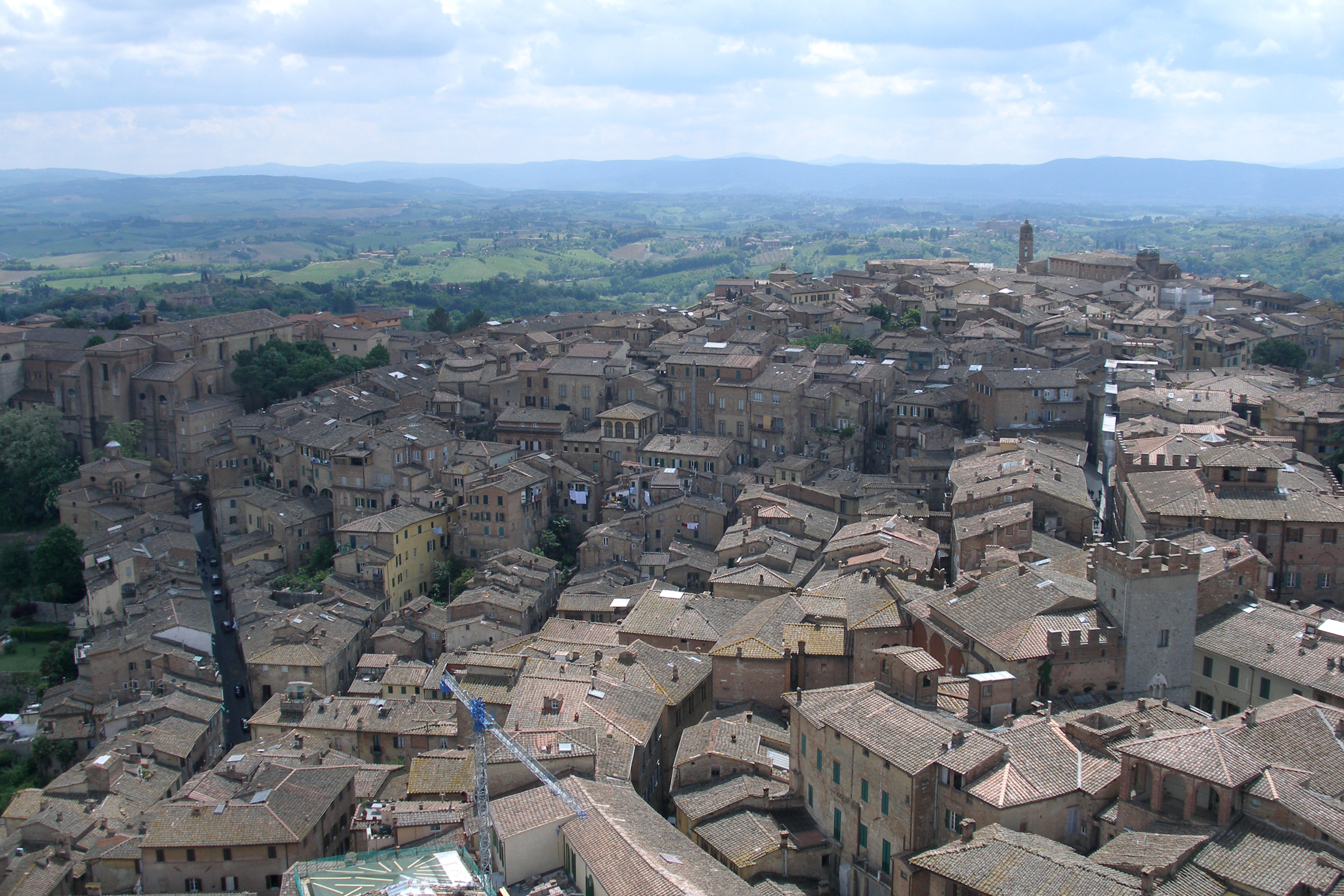
Panorama of Siena

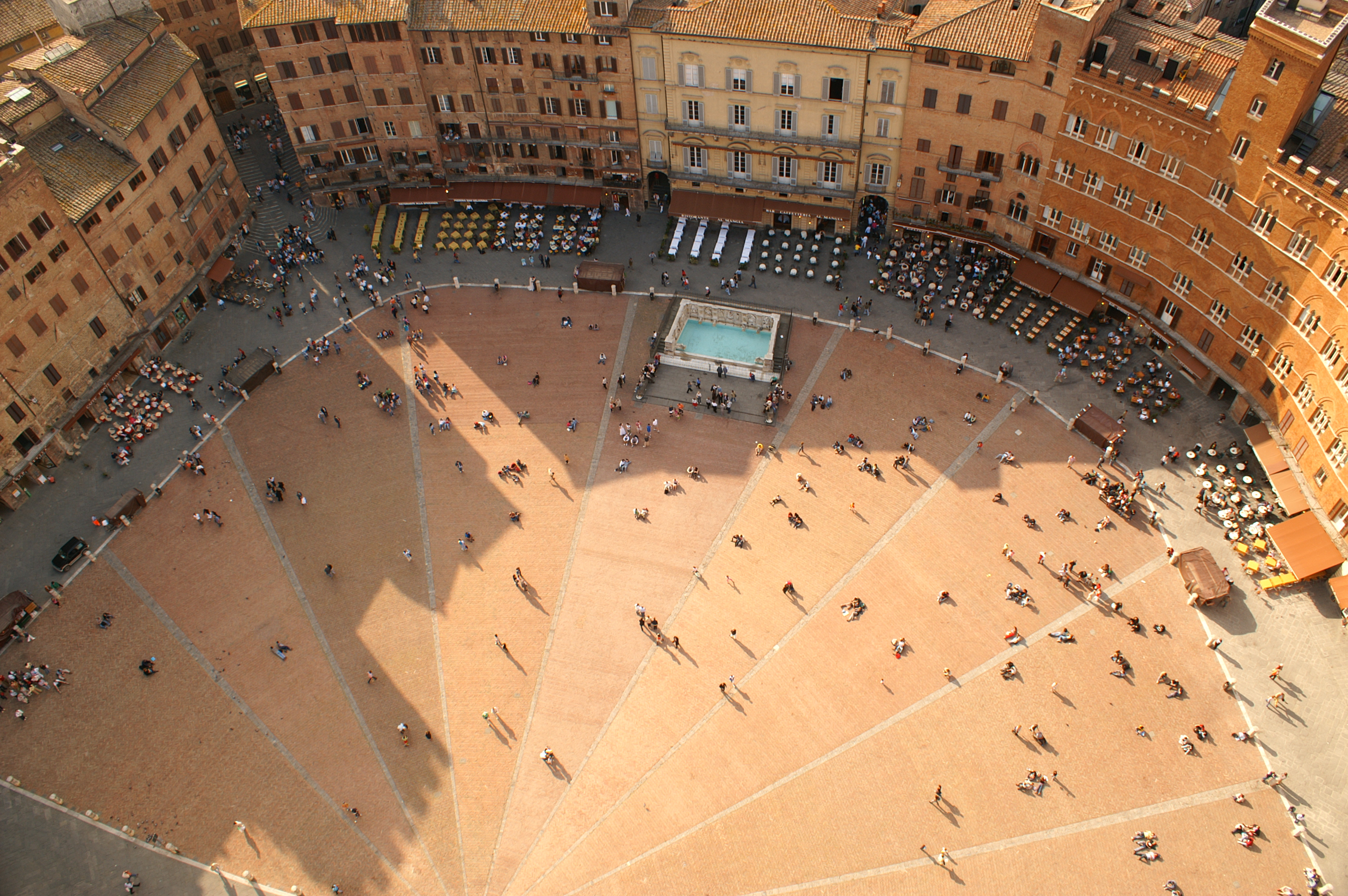
Piazza del Campo

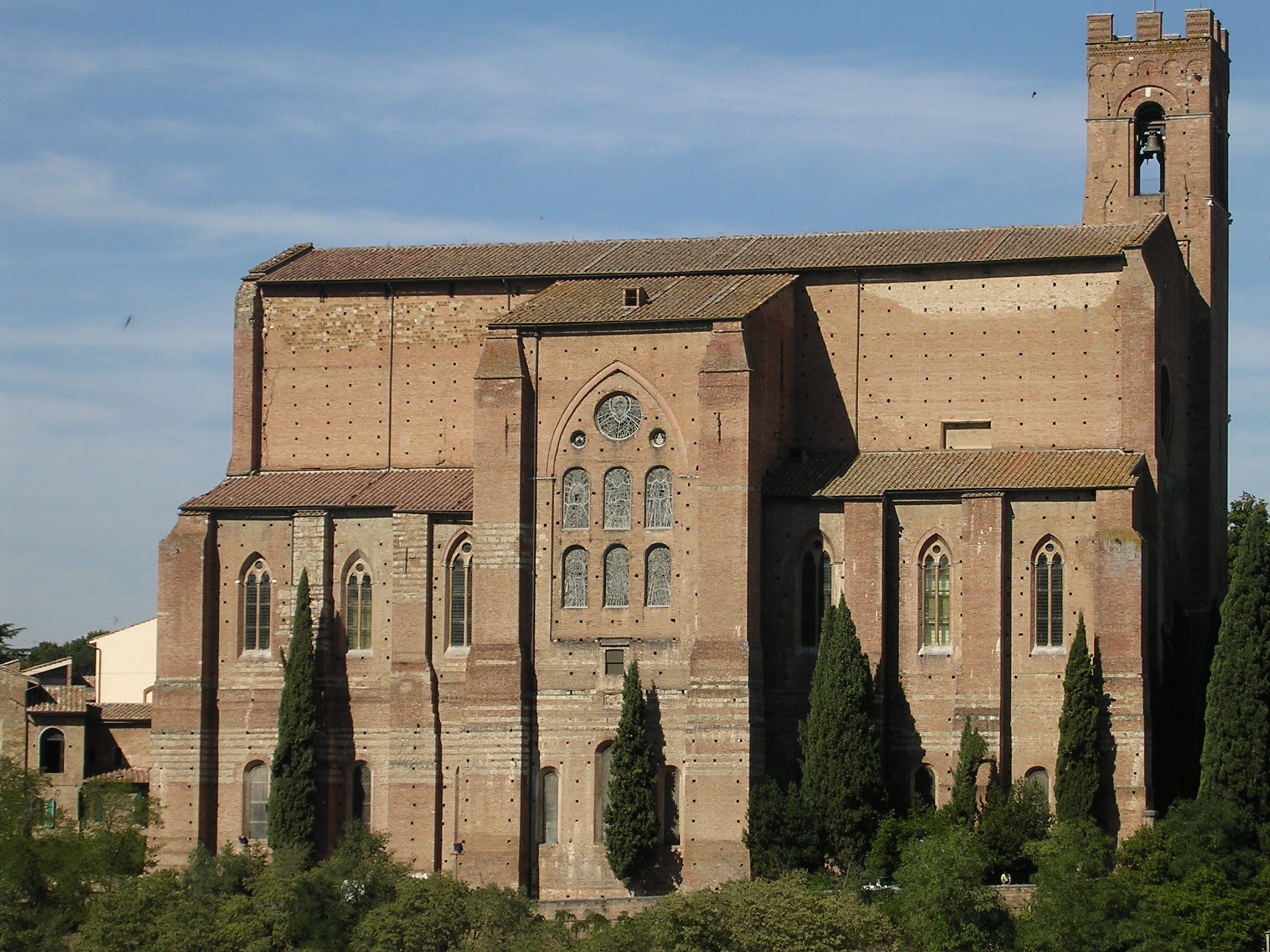
Basilica of San Domenico

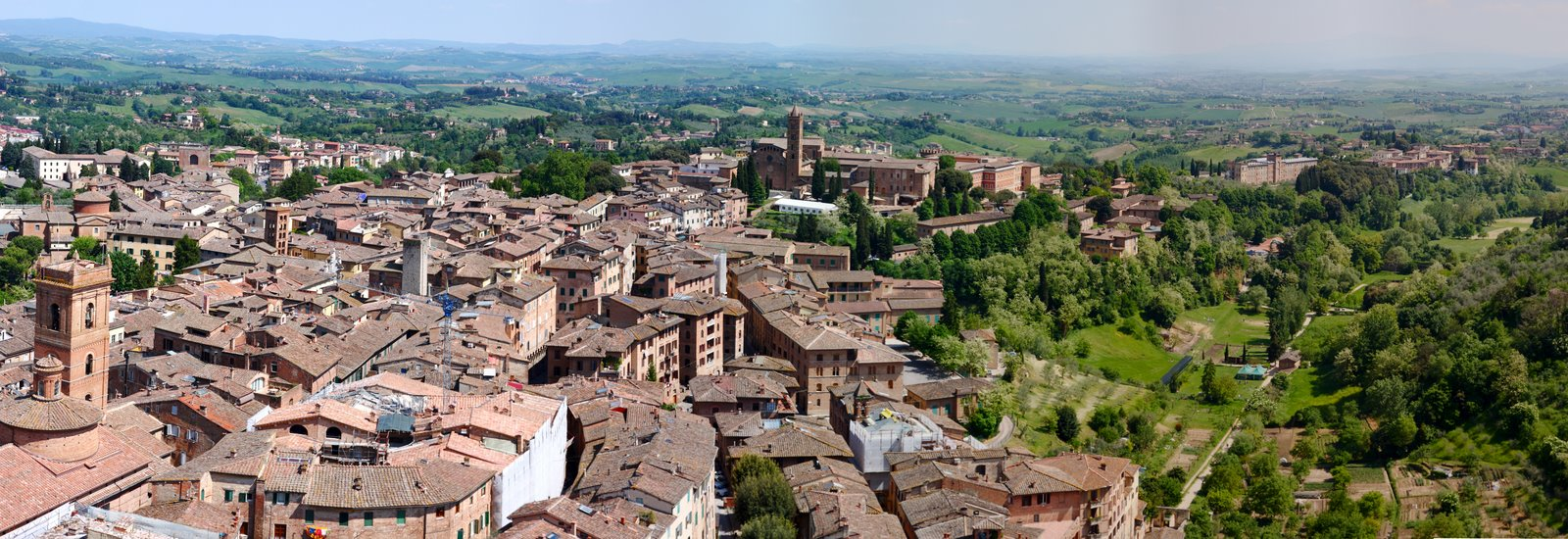
View from the Campanile del Mangia
A view of Siena from the Torre del Mangia
