= Santa Fiora =

- Comune
- Comune di Santa Fiora
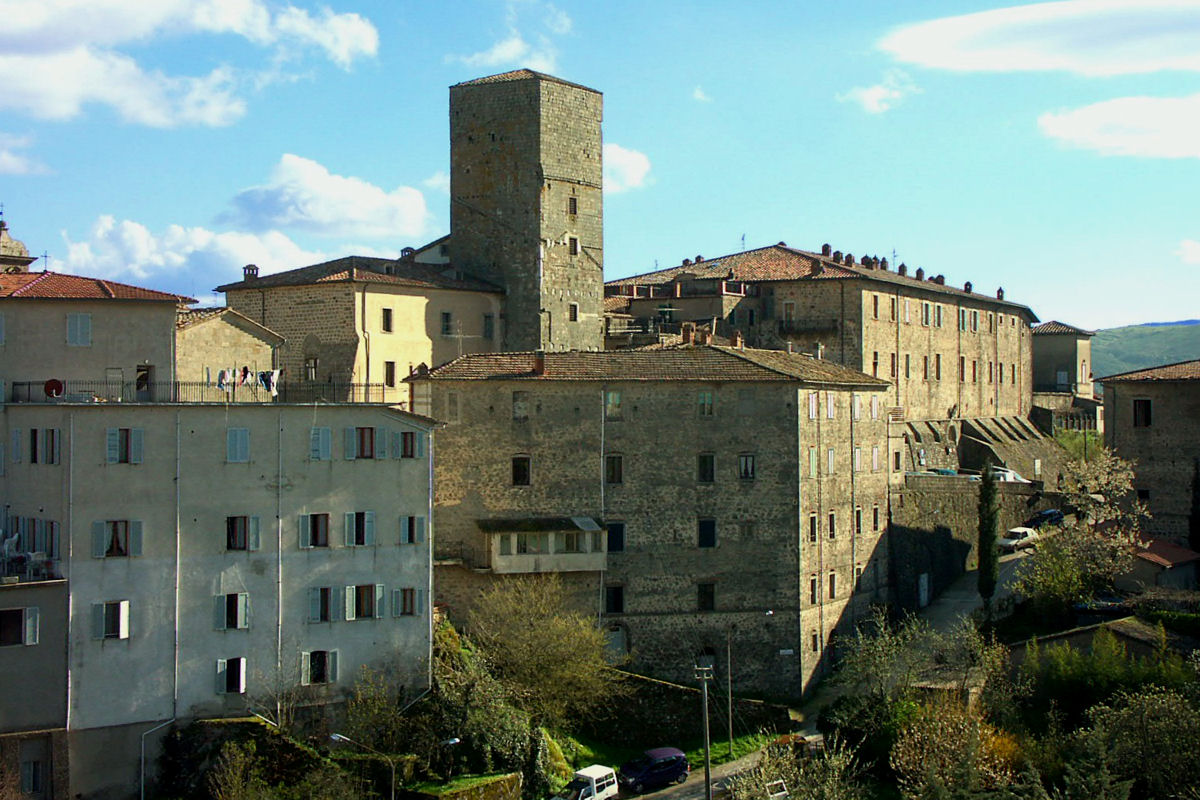

- Coat of arms

- Location within Italy Location within Tuscany
- Coordinates: 42°50′N 11°36′E
- Country: Italy
- Region: Tuscany
- Province: Grosseto (GR)
- Frazioni: Bagnolo, Bagnore, Marroneto, Selva

Government
  - Mayor: Federico Balocchi

Area
  - Total: 63.45 km^{2} (24.50 sq mi)
- Elevation: 687 m (2,254 ft)

Population (31 August 2020)
  - Total: 2,542
  - Density: 40.06/km^{2} (103.8/sq mi)
- Demonym: Santafioresi
- Time zone: UTC+1 (CET)
  - Summer (DST): UTC+2 (CEST)
- Postal code: 58037
- Dialing code: 0564
- Patron saint: Saints Flora and Lucilla
- Saint day: July 29
- Website: Official website

Santa Fiora is a comune (municipality) in the province of Grosseto, in the Italian region of Tuscany, located about 40 km (25 mi) east of Grosseto. Santa Fiora borders the following municipalities: Abbadia San Salvatore, Arcidosso, Castel del Piano, Castell'Azzara, Piancastagnaio, Roccalbegna, and Semproniano. It is one of I Borghi più belli d'Italia ("The most beautiful villages of Italy").

== History ==
Santa Fiora is mentioned for the first time in 890 AD, in a document listing properties of the Abbey of San Salvatore, Sforza Cesarini Archive Rome. By the eleventh century the lords of Santa Fiore were the Aldobrandeschi who, in 1082, started the construction of a castle here (Castello S. Flore) and walled the borgo. The power of the abbey passed by degrees to the Aldobrandeschi conti di San Fire, and in turn to the hegemony in Lower Tuscany of the commune of Siena, which had a strong influence on Santa Fiora by the mid fourteenth century, a future already foreseen by Dante: "e vedrai Santafior com' è oscura" – "and you shall see how obscure is Santa Fiore" (Purgatorio, canto VI, 111). In 1439, with the marriage of Cecilia Aldobrandeschi and Bosio Sforza, the castello and its town passed to the Sforza.

The Sforza of Santa Fiora reached their highest point of power with count Guido Sforza di Santa Fiora, who managed to establish himself as a relative of Pope Paul III Farnese, thereby gaining prestigious political positions for his relatives. Later the family became the Sforza Cesarini, who are still well represented and living in their Roman Palazzo Sforza Cesarini. The sovereign rights of the small state of Santa Fiora were sold to the Grand Duchy of Tuscany under Leopold II though all feudal rights remained to the family.

The comune was of importance for its mineral wealth in Monte Amiata of cinnabar, from which mercury is derived.

In the Middle Ages and during the modern era Santa Fiora was the capital of an independent state, the County of Santa Fiora.

== Frazioni ==
The municipality is formed by the municipal seat of Santa Fiora and the villages (frazioni) of Bagnolo, Bagnore, Marroneto and Selva.

== Main sights ==
=== Churches ===
- Pieve of Sante Flora e Lucilla
- Church of San Giuseppe
- Church of Suffragio
- Church of Sant'Agostino
- Church of Santa Chiara
- Church of Madonna delle Nevi
- Church of San Rocco, midway between Santa Fiora and the village of Marroneto
- Church of Santissimo Nome di Maria in the village of Bagnolo
- Church of Nostra Signora del Sacro Cuore in the village of Bagnore
- Convent of Santissima Trinità between Santa Fiora and the village of Selva

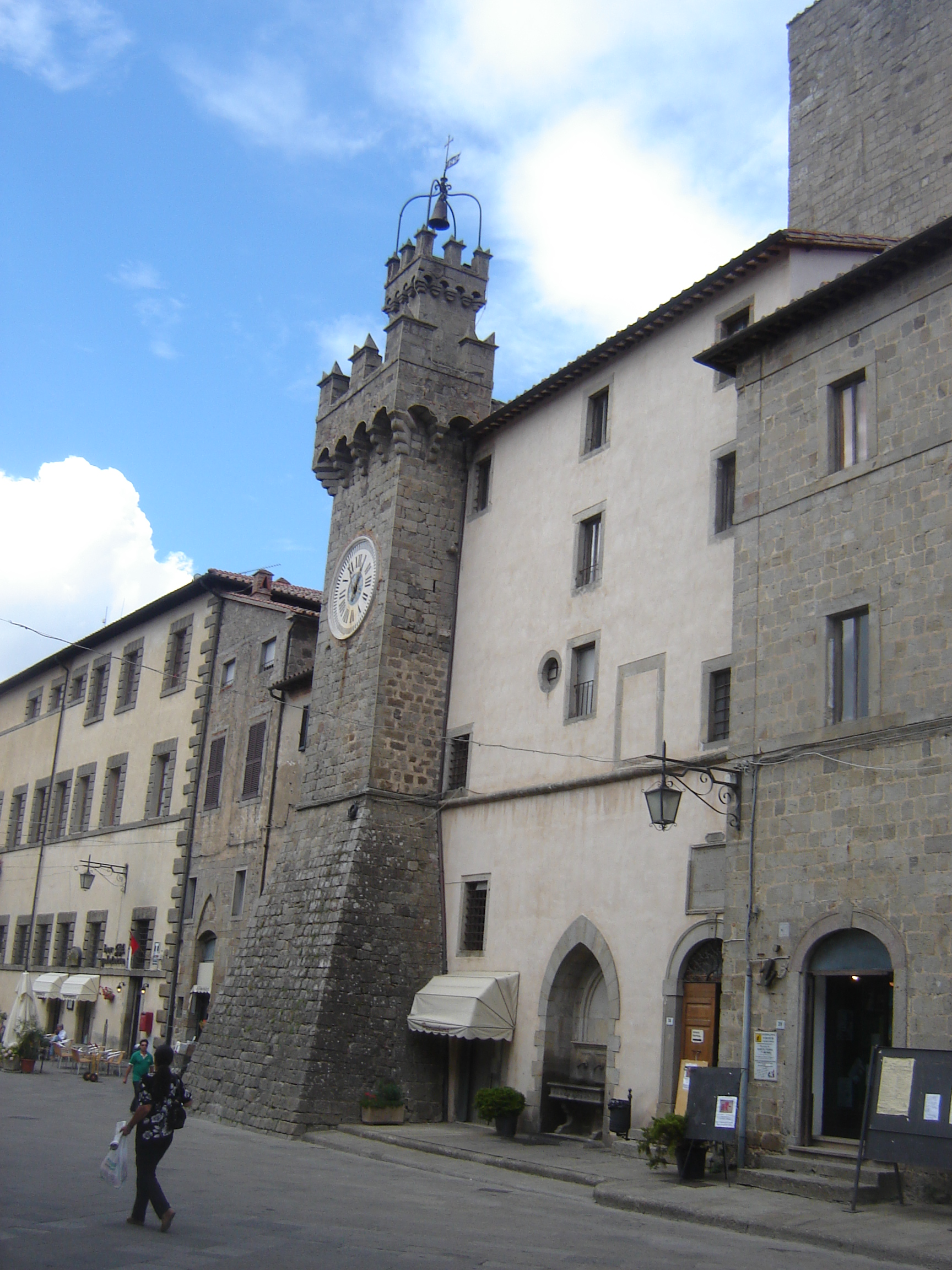
Piazza Garibaldi with the Palazzo Cesarini-Sforza.

=== Palazzi ===
- Palazzo Sforza Cesarini, built in 1575 over the Aldobrandeschi castle (of which two medieval towers still can be seen).
- Palazzo Pretorio
- Palazzo Luciani

=== Others ===
- Museum of mercury mines of Monte Amiata
- Peschiera of Santa Fiora

== Notable people ==
- Candido Amantini, Catholic priest and exorcist
- Ernesto Balducci, Roman Catholic priest and peace activist
- Laura Morante, actress
- Mario Pratesi, writer
- Valerio Valeri, Roman Catholic cardinal
