= Marroneto =

- Frazione
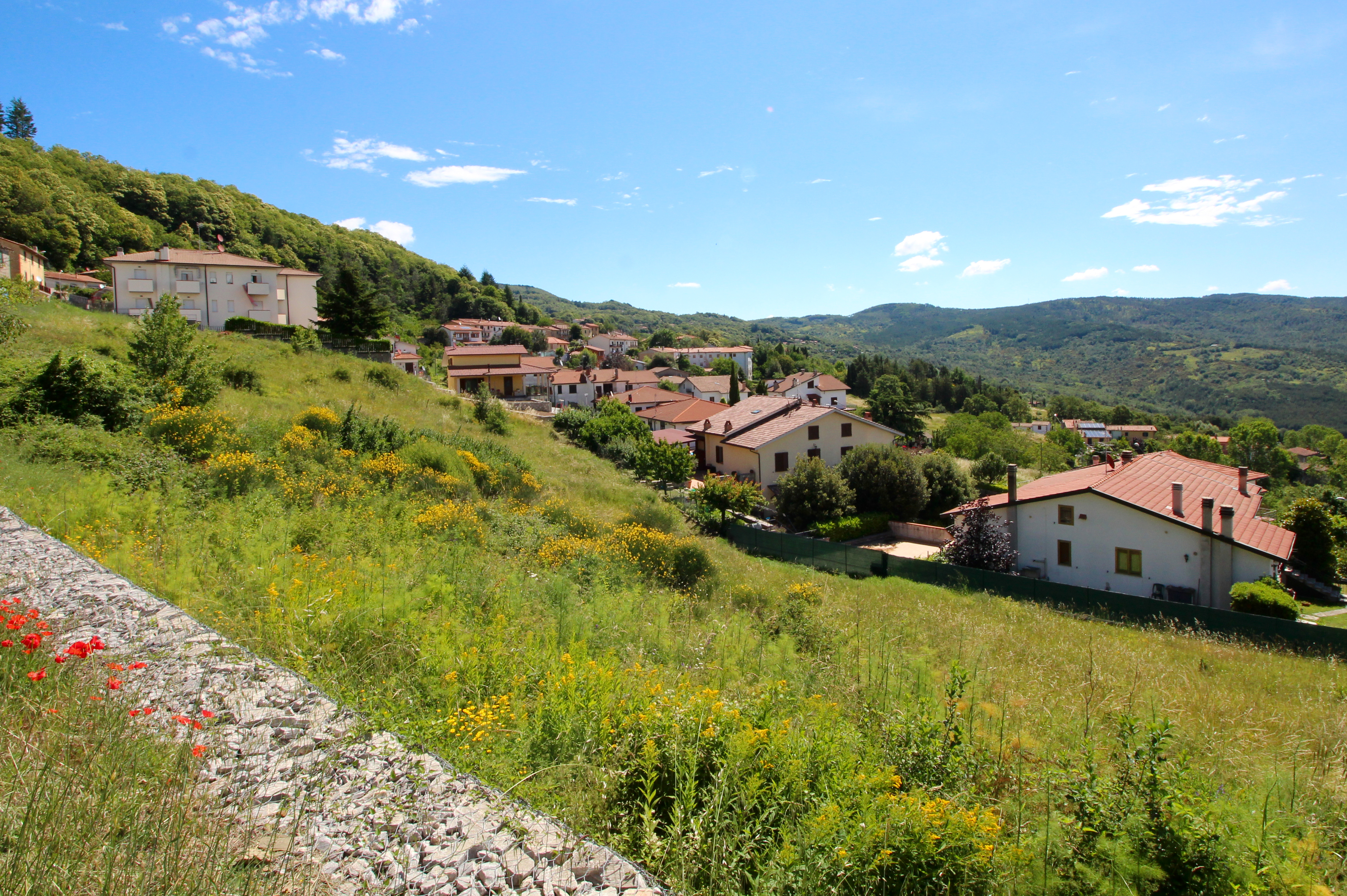

- Location of Marroneto in Italy
- Coordinates: 42°50′17″N 11°35′58″E
- Country: Italy
- Region: Tuscany
- Province: Grosseto (GR)
- Comune: Santa Fiora
- Elevation: 690 m (2,260 ft)
- Demonym: Marronetai
- Time zone: UTC+1 (CET)
  - Summer (DST): UTC+2 (CEST)
- Postal code: 58037
- Dialing code: (+39) 0564

Marroneto is a village in Tuscany, central Italy, administratively a frazione of the comune of Santa Fiora, province of Grosseto, in the area of Mount Amiata.

The village is named after the marroni (chestnuts).

== Geography ==
Marroneto is about 65 km from Grosseto and 1 km from Santa Fiora. The village is so close to Santa Fiora that it is considered a peripheral neighbourhood of the town. It is situated along the Provincial Road which links Santa Fiora to Bagnolo and Piancastagnaio.

=== Subdivisions ===
Marroneto is composed by eight hamlets: Case Baciacchi, Case Bigi, Case Raspini, Case Tonini, Gretini, Mormoraio, Renaiolo – the oldest one – and Soana.

== Traditions ==
The village is known for its well-preserved primitive traditions: the most important one is that of Carnevale Morto (Dead Carnival), an old ritual where Quaresima metaphorically kills Carnevale.

== Bibliography ==
- Arezzini, Michele (2016). Santa Fiora e il suo territorio. Arcidosso: Edizioni Effigi. pp. 26–27.
- Niccolai, Lucio (2009). Santa Fiora. Invito alla scoperta del centro storico e del territorio. Arcidosso: Edizioni Effigi. pp. 87–89, 104–109.
