= Seggiano =

- Comune
- Comune di Seggiano
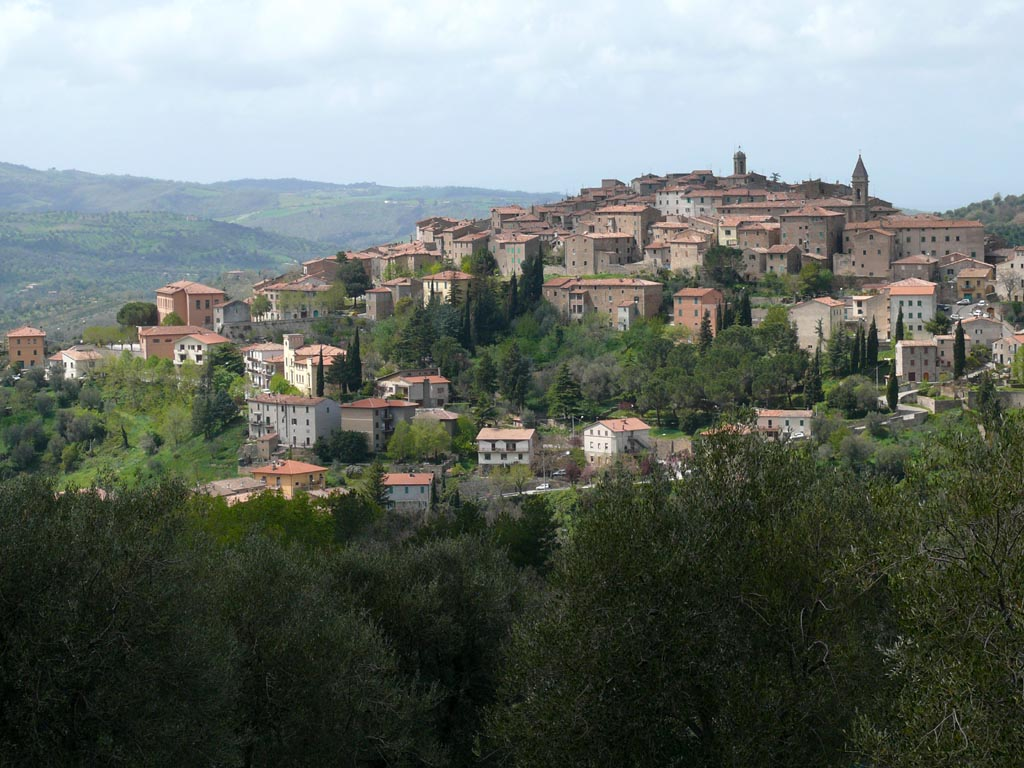

- Coat of arms

- Location within Italy Location within Tuscany
- Coordinates: 42°55′N 11°33′E
- Country: Italy
- Region: Tuscany
- Province: Grosseto (GR)
- Frazioni: Pescina

Government
  - Mayor: Daniele Rossi

Area
  - Total: 49.6 km^{2} (19.2 sq mi)
- Elevation: 491 m (1,611 ft)

Population (31 May 2009)
  - Total: 984
  - Density: 19.8/km^{2} (51.4/sq mi)
- Demonym: Seggianesi
- Time zone: UTC+1 (CET)
  - Summer (DST): UTC+2 (CEST)
- Postal code: 58038
- Dialing code: 0564

Seggiano is a comune (municipality) in the Province of Grosseto in the Italian region Tuscany, located about 100 kilometres (62 mi) south of Florence and about 40 kilometres (25 mi) northeast of Grosseto.

The center is situated on the foothills of the north-western hills of Monte Amiata in a dominating position with respect to the underlying course of the Orcia river and its tributaries, Vivo and Ente.

Seggiano borders the following municipalities: Abbadia San Salvatore, Castel del Piano, Castiglione d'Orcia.

Near Seggiano is the "Giardino di Daniel Spoerri", a sculpture garden by the artist Daniel Spoerri.

== Territory ==
The municipality covers an area of less than 50 square kilometres (19 mi^{2}), between the north-west slopes of the volcanic massif of Monte Amiata and a section of the Val d'Orcia, the point at which creeps from the province of Siena towards that of Grosseto. It is bordered to the north by the municipality of Castiglione d'Orcia and the province of Siena, in the east with the same province and the municipality of Abbadia San Salvatore, while to the south and west borders the town of Castel del Piano.

With the exception of units of low hill near the beds of rivers, the region extends mainly in hilly and mountainous odds, but good exposure allows the cultivation of a cultivar of olive, Olivastra Seggianese, called up to elevations of low mountains, managing to produce an oil of excellent quality.

== History ==
The center was built in the early 10th century as a possession of the abbey of San Salvatore al Monte Amiata, which gave a thousand years after the rights of the Abbey of Saint Antimo.

Seggiano was ruled from Siena starting in the second half of the 13th century, during which exerted strong influences of the Salimbeni family until the 14th and the 15th century onwards Ugurgeri. In 1555, the town became part of the Grand Duchy of Tuscany.

== Government ==
=== List of mayors ===
Mayor	Term start	Term end	Party
Sergio Monaci	1995	2004	Independent (centre-right)
Daniele Rossi	2004	2014	Independent (centre-left)
Gianpiero Secco	2014	2019	Civic
Daniele Rossi	2019	Incumbent	Independent (centre-left)

== Culture ==
- Inside the Town Hall is the Center for Documentation of Cultural Heritage on Permanent Land, where you can get information on works of art that you can visit in the city, including the Madonna and Child Santi of Master of Panzano and two works from the school of the brothers Nasini.
- Giardino di Daniel Spoerri, located a few kilometers from the village, is a scenic park-museum created by a Swiss artist, where are located many of his sculptures are well integrated in the environment.

=== Olearie (oil festival) ===
In December there is the traditional Olive Festival during which you can taste local products and visit the historical monuments in the country, including the old mill recently restored and opened to the public. In addition, the City Hall hosts many conferences on the theme of food.

== Main sights ==
=== Historical center ===
The medieval origins can be traced in the walls built, in large part, the exterior walls of some buildings, access to the village is possible through three doors: Porta di San Gervasio, Porta degli Azzolini and Porta del Mercato.

=== Cisternone ===
Is an old collector of rainwater, recently renovated, located in the town center. The interior of this old building is designed to accept an olive plant supported by steel cables that will feed water vapor.

=== Religious architecture ===
- San Bartolomeo: 13th-century church, rebuilt over the centuries. The church has a nave and two aisles, and houses a 14th-century altarpiece attributed to Bulgarini, others attributed to Ugolino Lorenzetti, as well as frescoes of the 16th century.
- Chiesa della Compagnia del Corpus Domini:

Includes San Bernardino following the transfer inside the shrine, with objects belonging to the saint, previously kept at the Convent of Colombaio. Inside are placed some paintings depicting saints.

- San Rocco: 15th-century oratory, built against the town walls, contains frescoes by Girolamo di Domenico.
- Shrine of Our Lady of Charity: Renaissance church at the foot of the country and restored in later periods. The facade in the style is trachyte Baroque; very characteristic is the dome brick. The church has a fresco placed on the portal of the Annunciation, while inside there are several altars.
- Convent of Colombaio: monastery located not far from Castle Potentino, was the first monastery founded by Franciscan in the province of Grosseto.
- Santa Maria in Villa: church just outside of town, with gabled facade and bell tower. It houses an icon of the Madonna surrounded by frescoes by Francesco Nasini with figures of angels and saints.
- Sant'Antonio di Padova: chapel within the Castle Potentino

=== Architecture military ===
- Walls Seggiano

Made from 10th century, define and enclose the entire medieval village, which can be accessed through one of three doors that open along the walls.

- Castle Potentino

Is a medieval castle located a few miles downstream to the north-west of the country. The castle, which shows signs of restructuring the Renaissance, is home to a renowned farm and vineyard owned by the heirs of British writer Graham Greene.
