= Bagnolo, Santa Fiora =

Bagnolo
- Frazione
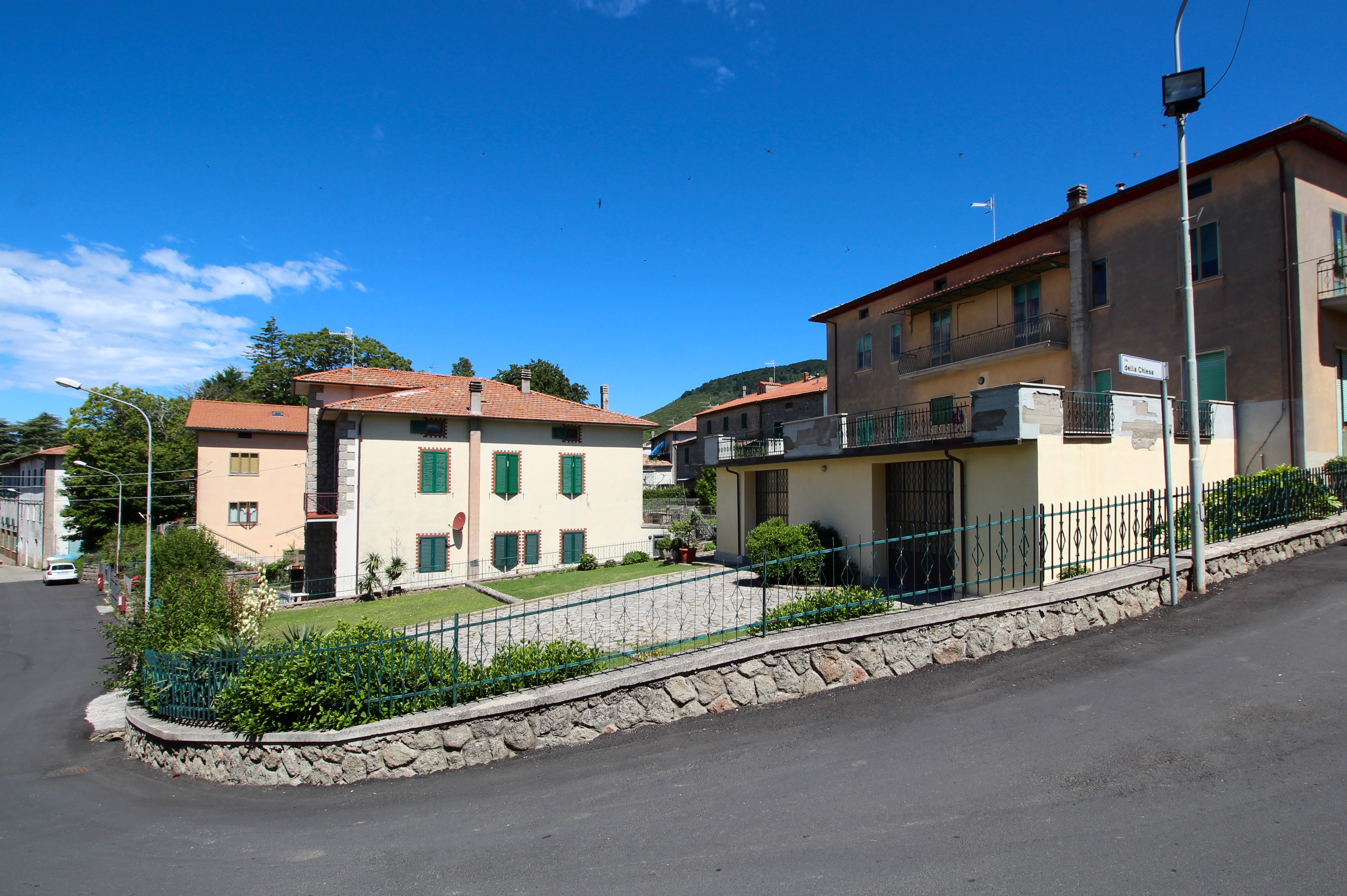

- Location of Bagnolo in Italy
- Coordinates: 42°50′24″N 11°36′59″E
- Country: Italy
- Region: Tuscany
- Province: Grosseto (GR)
- Comune: Santa Fiora
- Elevation: 800 m (2,600 ft)

Population (2011)
  - Total: 612
- Demonym(s): Bagnolesi, Bagnolai
- Time zone: UTC+1 (CET)
  - Summer (DST): UTC+2 (CEST)
- Postal code: 58037
- Dialing code: (+39) 0564

Bagnolo (Italian: [baɲˈɲɔːlo]) is a village in Tuscany, in central Italy. It is administratively a frazione of the comune of Santa Fiora, province of Grosseto. At the time of the 2001 census, its population amounted to 566.

Bagnolo is about 65 km from Grosseto and 3 km from Santa Fiora, and it is situated along the provincial road which links Santa Fiora to Piancastagnaio, in the southern side of Monte Amiata. The palio dei somari (donkeys) takes place every year in Bagnolo. The notable exorcist Candido Amantini was born in Bagnolo.

== Main sights ==
- Santissimo Nome di Maria (19th century), the main parish church of the village, it was built in 1863.
- Church of Madonna del Rosario
- Seven Springs: seven water springs dislocated throughout the village - fonte Spilli, fontanile delle Piazze, fonte Baldina, il fontanino, fonte della Faggia, fonte Perino, fonte delle Monache.

== Bibliography ==
- Lucio Niccolai, Santa Fiora. Invito alla scoperta del centro storico e del territorio, Effigi, Arcidosso, 2009, pp. 91–96.
