= Castiglione d'Orcia =

- Comune
- Comune di Castiglione d'Orcia
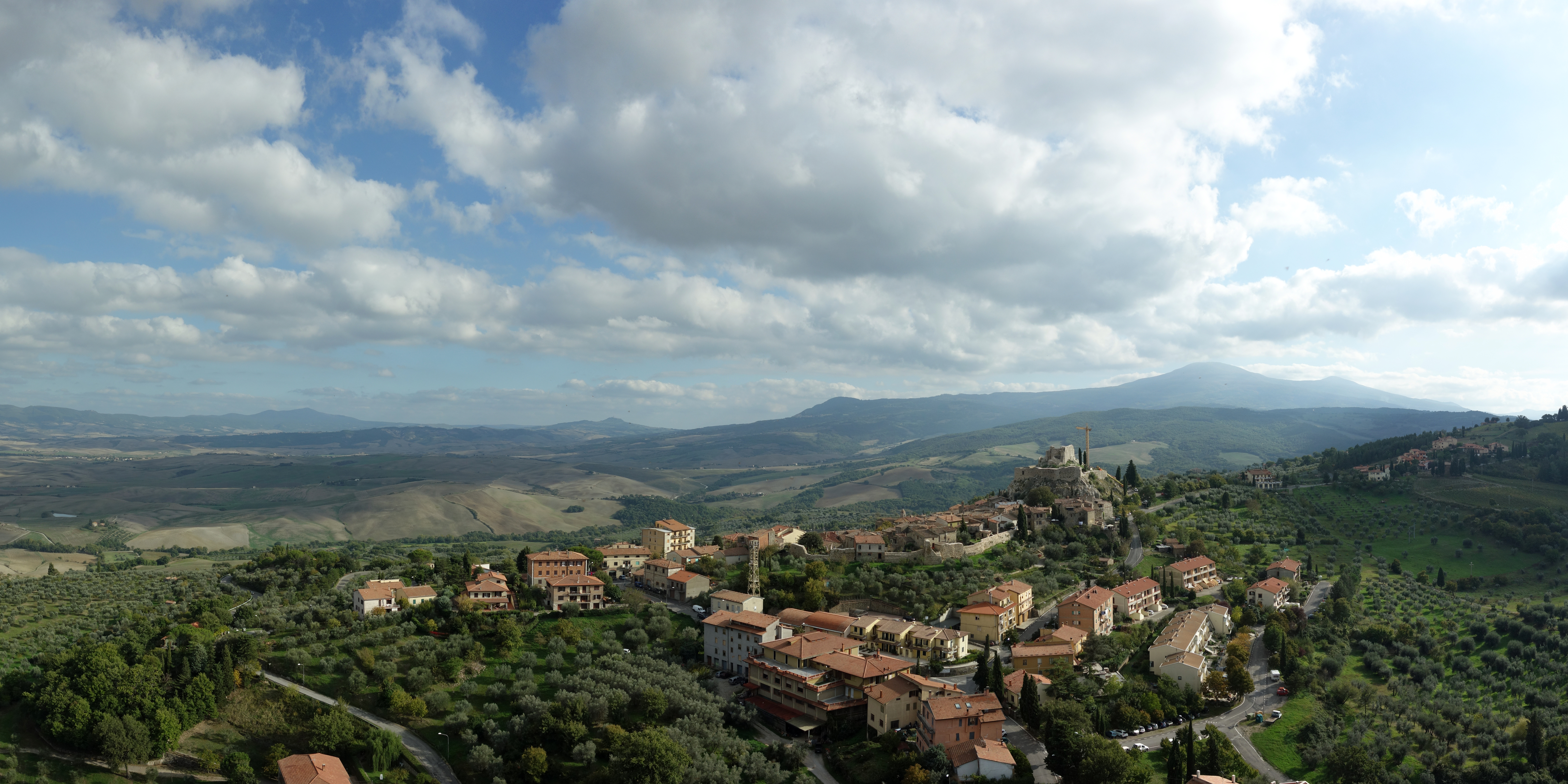

- Coat of arms

- Location within Italy Location within Tuscany
- Coordinates: 43°1′N 11°37′E
- Country: Italy
- Region: Tuscany
- Province: Siena (SI)
- Frazioni: Bagni San Filippo, Campiglia d'Orcia, Gallina, Rocca d'Orcia, Vivo d'Orcia

Government
  - Mayor: Claudio Galletti

Area
  - Total: 141.7 km^{2} (54.7 sq mi)
- Elevation: 540 m (1,770 ft)

Population (December 2022)
  - Total: 2,144
  - Density: 15.13/km^{2} (39.19/sq mi)
- Demonym: Castiglionesi
- Time zone: UTC+1 (CET)
  - Summer (DST): UTC+2 (CEST)
- Postal code: 53023
- Dialing code: 0577
- Website: www.comune.castiglionedorcia.siena.it

Castiglione d'Orcia is a comune (municipality) in the Province of Siena in the Italian region of Tuscany, located about 90 kilometres (56 mi) southeast of Florence and about 40 kilometres (25 mi) southeast of Siena, in the Val d'Orcia, not far from the Via Cassia.

Castiglione d'Orcia borders the following municipalities: Abbadia San Salvatore, Castel del Piano, Montalcino, Pienza, Radicofani, San Quirico d'Orcia, Seggiano and with a little characteristic town of few inhabitants, located on a rock, called “Campiglia d’Orcia”.

== History ==
The settlement is mentioned for the first time in 714, when it was a possession of the Aldobrandeschi family. In 1252 it became a free commune, but lost its independence in the following century to the Republic of Siena, which entrusted it to powerful families like the Piccolomini and Salimbeni. Later, Castiglione was part of the Grand Duchy of Tuscany and, from 1861, of unified Italy.

== Main sights ==
Both these locations are a museum and can be visited during appropriate hours.

- Rocca (Castle) of Tentennano, overlooking the frazione of Rocca d'Orcia. It was the centre of the struggle between the Salimbeni and the Republic of Siena, which re-acquired it in 1408. In the 16th century it was again contended between Siena and Florence. It was handed over to the government in 1971 after fear by the owners due to the old age of the fortress and danger of rocks hitting people.
- Rocca Aldobrandesca.
- Romanesque churches of Santa Maria Maddalena and Santi Stefano and Degna. The latter houses a Madonna with Child by Simone Martini and a Madonna with Child by Pietro Lorenzetti.
