= Pescina, Seggiano =

Pescina
- Frazione
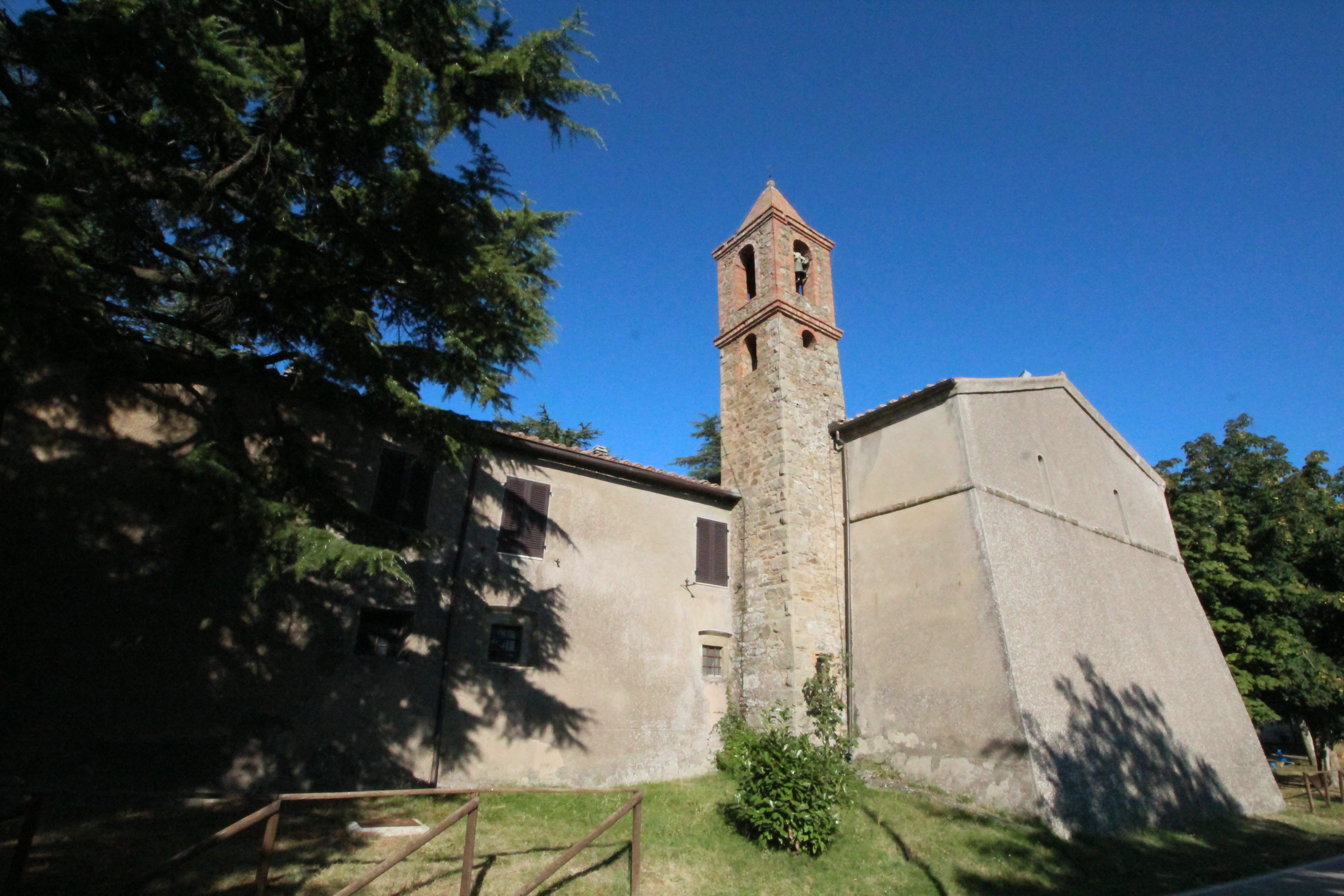
- The church of San Lorenzo

- Location of Pescina in Italy
- Coordinates: 42°55′10″N 11°35′15″E
- Country: Italy
- Region: Tuscany
- Province: Grosseto (GR)
- Comune: Seggiano
- Elevation: 747 m (2,451 ft)

Population (2011)
  - Total: 173
- Time zone: UTC+1 (CET)
  - Summer (DST): UTC+2 (CEST)
- Postal code: 58038
- Dialing code: (+39) 0564

Pescina is a village in Tuscany, central Italy, administratively a frazione of the comune of Seggiano, province of Grosseto, in the area of Mount Amiata. At the time of the 2001 census its population amounted to 153.

Pescina is about 62 km from Grosseto and 5 km from Seggiano, and it is situated along the Provincial Road which links Seggiano to the top of Mount Amiata.

== Main sights ==
- San Lorenzo Martire, main parish church of the village, it contains a Madonna col Bambino by Luca di Tommè.
- Giardino di Daniel Spoerri, a contemporary sculpture garden founded by artist Daniel Spoerri in 1997.

== Cuisine ==
The village is known for its typical dish, sugo di scottiglia alla pescinaia, or simply "scottiglia", a sauce with a mixture of beef, pork, chicken, turkey, rabbit and lamb.

== Bibliography ==
- Aldo Mazzolai, Guida della Maremma. Percorsi tra arte e natura, Le Lettere, Florence, 1997
