= Triana, Tuscany =

Triana
- Frazione
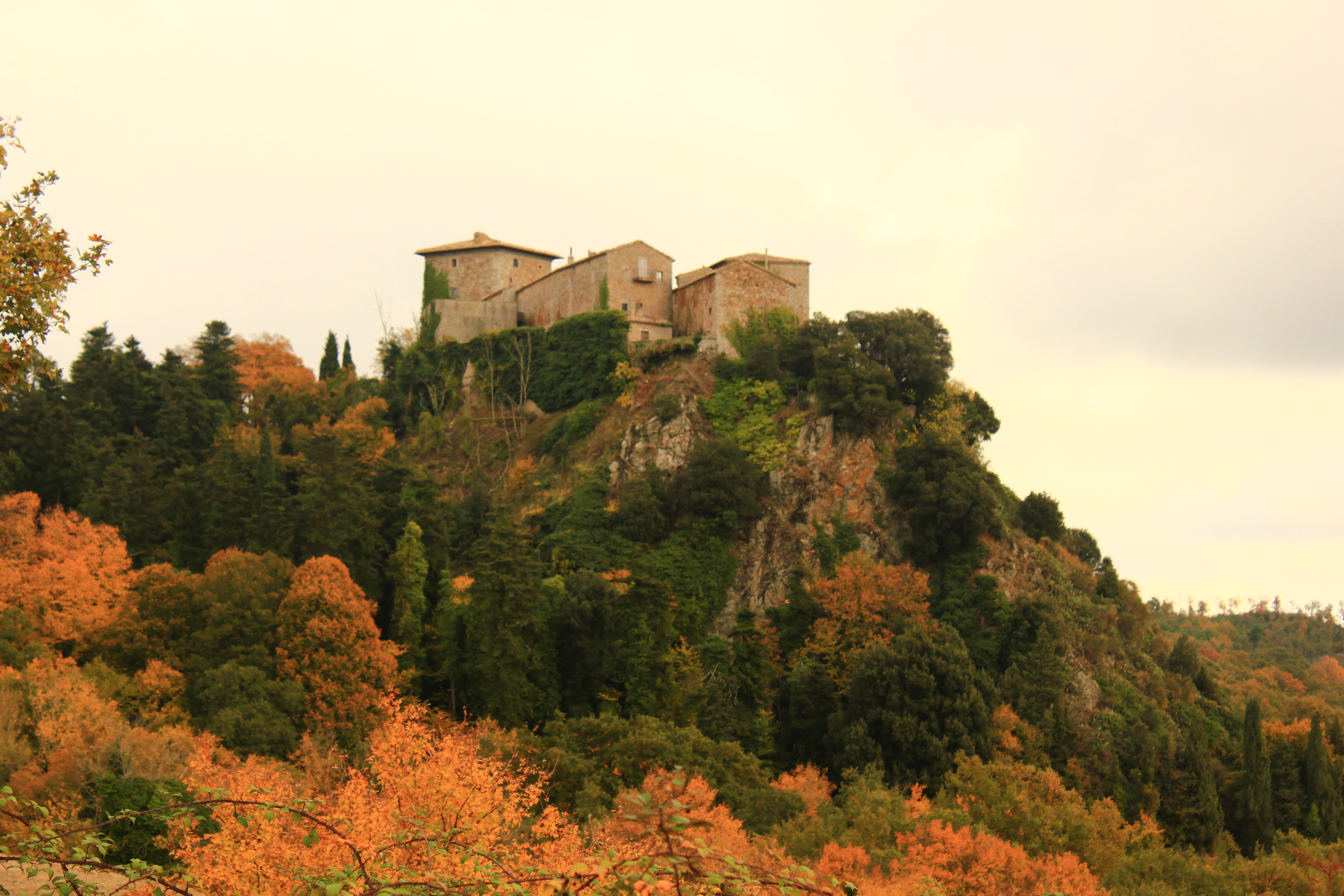
- View of Triana

- Location of Triana in Italy
- Coordinates: 42°47′20″N 11°32′59″E
- Country: Italy
- Region: Tuscany
- Province: Grosseto (GR)
- Comune: Roccalbegna
- Elevation: 769 m (2,523 ft)

Population (2011)
  - Total: 58
- Demonym: Trianini
- Time zone: UTC+1 (CET)
  - Summer (DST): UTC+2 (CEST)
- Postal code: 58053
- Dialing code: (+39) 0564

Triana is a village in Tuscany, central Italy, administratively a frazione of the comune of Roccalbegna, province of Grosseto, in the southern area of Mount Amiata. At the time of the 2001 census its population amounted to 14.

Triana is about 50 km from Grosseto and 5 km from Roccalbegna.

== Main sights ==
- San Bernardino, main parish of the village, it was built in 1780 by Piccolomini.
- Chapel of Madonna del Loreto (17th century), little chapel of the castle.
- Castle of Triana, medieval castle once ruled by the Aldobrandeschi.

== See also ==
- Cana, Tuscany
- Santa Caterina, Roccalbegna
- Vallerona
