= Selva, Santa Fiora =

Selva
- Frazione
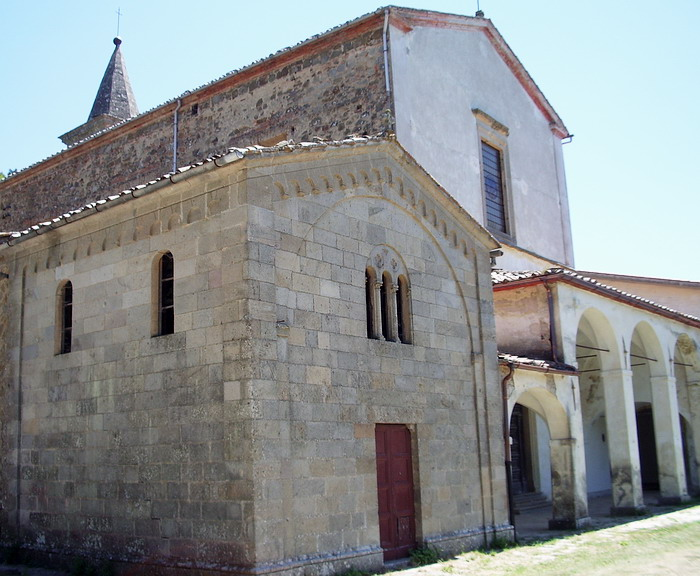
- The church of Santo Stefano with the convent of Santissima Trinità

- Location of Selva in Italy
- Coordinates: 42°47′40″N 11°35′54″E
- Country: Italy
- Region: Tuscany
- Province: Grosseto (GR)
- Comune: Santa Fiora
- Elevation: 788 m (2,585 ft)

Population (2011)
  - Total: 100
- Demonym: Selvaioli
- Time zone: UTC+1 (CET)
  - Summer (DST): UTC+2 (CEST)
- Postal code: 58037
- Dialing code: (+39) 0564

Selva is a village in Tuscany, central Italy, administratively a frazione of the comune of Santa Fiora, province of Grosseto. At the time of the 2001 census its population amounted to 100.

Selva is about 70 km from Grosseto and 7 km from Santa Fiora, and it is situated along the provincial road which links Santa Fiora to Castell'Azzara, at the slopes of Monte Calvo, one of the peaks of the massif of Monte Amiata. The village dates back to the Middle Ages and it is situated in the Bosco della Santissima Trinità Natural Reserve. According to legend, the convent of Selva keeps inside a "dragon skull": the monster (actually a crocodile) was killed by count Guido Sforza of Santa Fiora in the late 15th century and its skull preserved inside the church.

== Main sights ==
- Church of Santo Stefano (15th century), main parish church of the village, it was re-built in Romanesque Revival style in 1933.
- Convent of Santissima Trinità (15th century), it is annexed to the parish church and built by the Sforza family in 1488. It contains several Renaissance and Baroque paintings and frescoes: the most important one is the panel of Assunzione della Vergine con i santi Girolamo e Francesco by artist Girolamo di Benvenuto.
- Church of Madonna Addolorata (19th century), small church situated in the centre of Selva, it was built in 1828 and consecrated in 1833.

== Bibliography ==
- Bruno Santi, Guida storico-artistica alla Maremma. Itinerari culturali nella provincia di Grosseto, Siena, Nuova Immagine, 1995, pp. 223–224.
- Lucio Niccolai, Santa Fiora. Invito alla scoperta del centro storico e del territorio, Effigi, Arcidosso, 2009.
