= Sante Flora e Lucilla =

Sante Flora e Lucilla may refer to:

- Sante Flora e Lucilla, Arezzo
- Sante Flora e Lucilla, Santa Fiora
