= Abbadia San Salvatore =

- Comune
- Comune di Abbadia San Salvatore
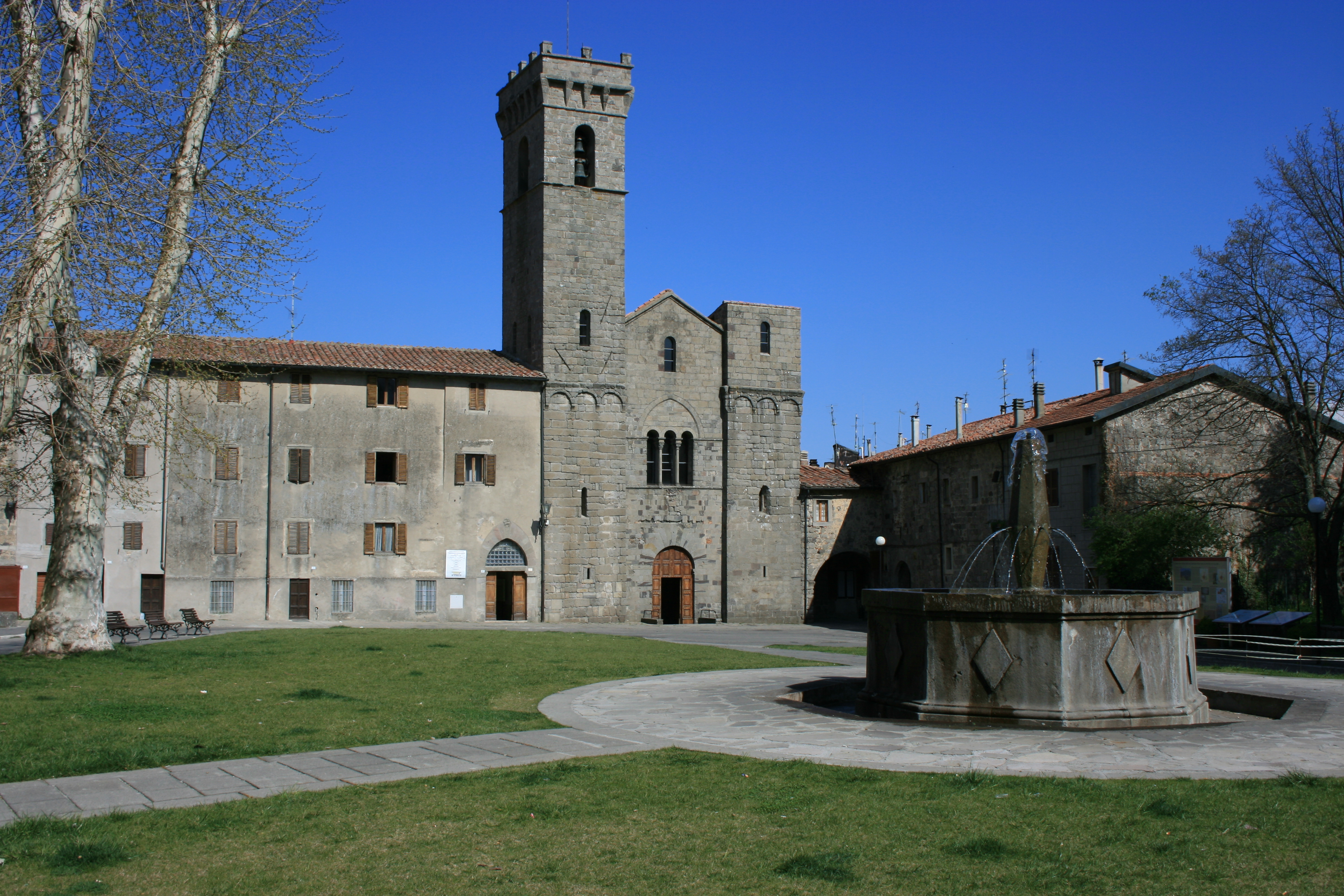

- Coat of arms

- Location of Abbadia San Salvatore in Italy Abbadia San Salvatore (Tuscany)
- Coordinates: 42°53′N 11°41′E
- Country: Italy
- Region: Tuscany
- Province: Siena (SI)

Government
  - Mayor: Fabrizio Tondi

Area
  - Total: 58.9 km^{2} (22.7 sq mi)
- Elevation: 822 m (2,697 ft)

Population (December 2023)
  - Total: 5,986
  - Density: 102/km^{2} (263/sq mi)
- Demonyms: Abbadenghi, Badenghi
- Time zone: UTC+1 (CET)
  - Summer (DST): UTC+2 (CEST)
- Postal code: 53021
- Dialing code: 0577
- Patron saint: St. Mark
- Saint day: September 19
- Website: Official website

Abbadia San Salvatore is a comune (municipality) in the Province of Siena in the Italian region Tuscany, located about 110 kilometres (68 mi) southeast of Florence and about 60 kilometres (37 mi) southeast of Siena, in the area of Monte Amiata.

The town is named after the Abbey of the same name. The area was once important for the extraction of cinnabar. Attractions in the town include the medieval borough, the Palazzo della Potesta (15th century) and the church of Santa Croce.

Abbadia San Salvatore borders the following municipalities: Castel del Piano, Castiglione d'Orcia, Piancastagnaio, Radicofani, San Casciano dei Bagni, Santa Fiora, Seggiano.
