= Cana, Tuscany =

Cana
- Frazione
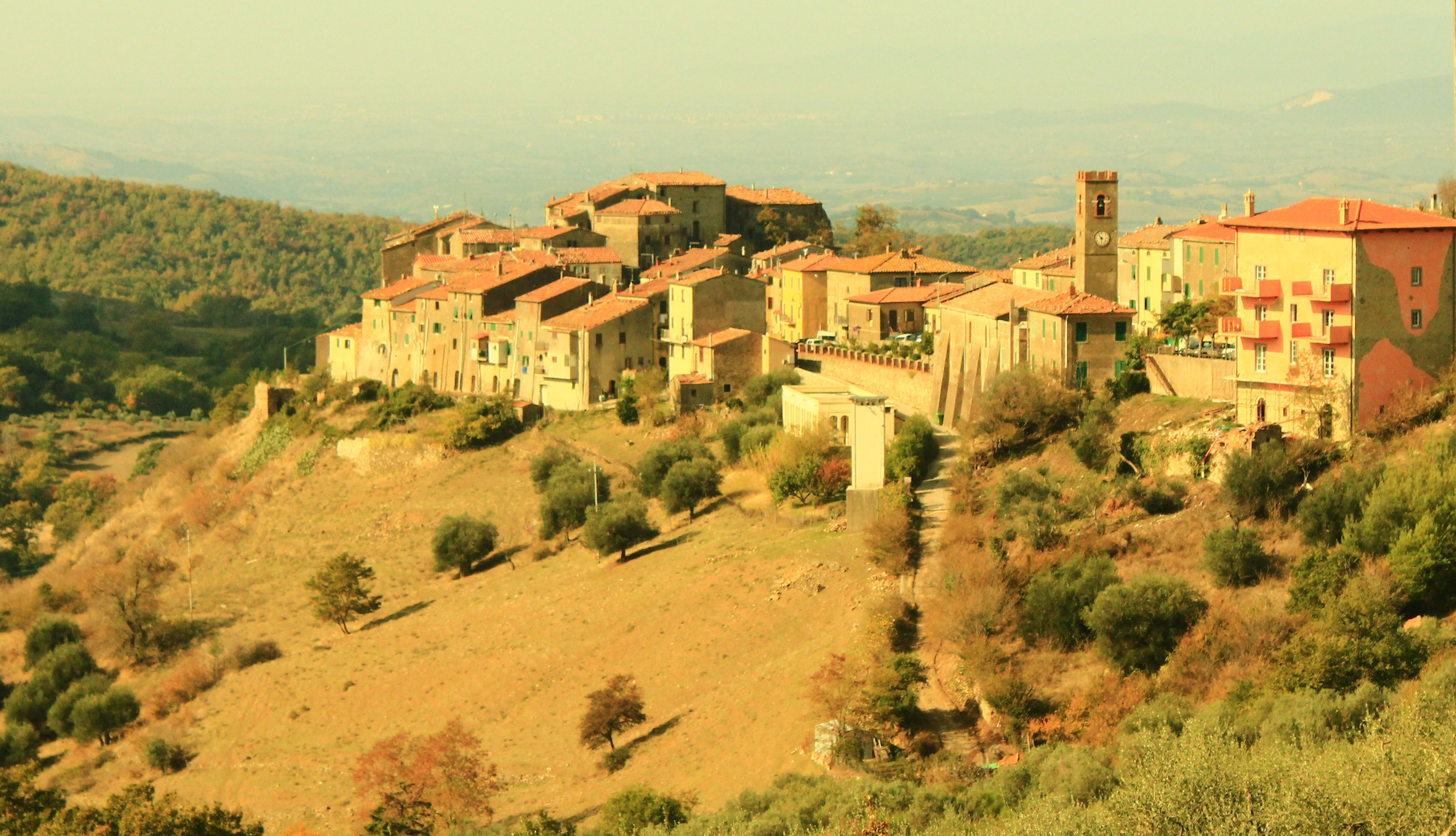
- View of Cana

- Location of Cana in Italy
- Coordinates: 42°47′47″N 11°25′32″E
- Country: Italy
- Region: Tuscany
- Province: Grosseto (GR)
- Comune: Roccalbegna
- Elevation: 480 m (1,570 ft)

Population (2011)
  - Total: 263
- Demonym: Canesi
- Time zone: UTC+1 (CET)
  - Summer (DST): UTC+2 (CEST)
- Postal code: 58053
- Dialing code: (+39) 0564

Cana is a village in Tuscany, central Italy, administratively a frazione of the comune of Roccalbegna, province of Grosseto, in the southern area of Mount Amiata. At the time of the 2001 census its population amounted to 225.

Cana is about 32 km from Grosseto and 11 km from Roccalbegna.

== Main sights ==
- San Martino (13th century), main parish of the village, it was rebuilt in 1970.
- Madonna del Conforto (15th century), little chapel which contains the painting of Vergine del Conforto.
- Walls of Cana, old fortifications which surround the village since 13th century.
- Rocca aldobrandesca (13th century), a fortress built by Aldobrandeschi family.
- Medicean well, a 17th-century well built by Medici.

== See also ==
- Santa Caterina, Roccalbegna
- Triana, Tuscany
- Vallerona
