= Vallerona =

- Frazione
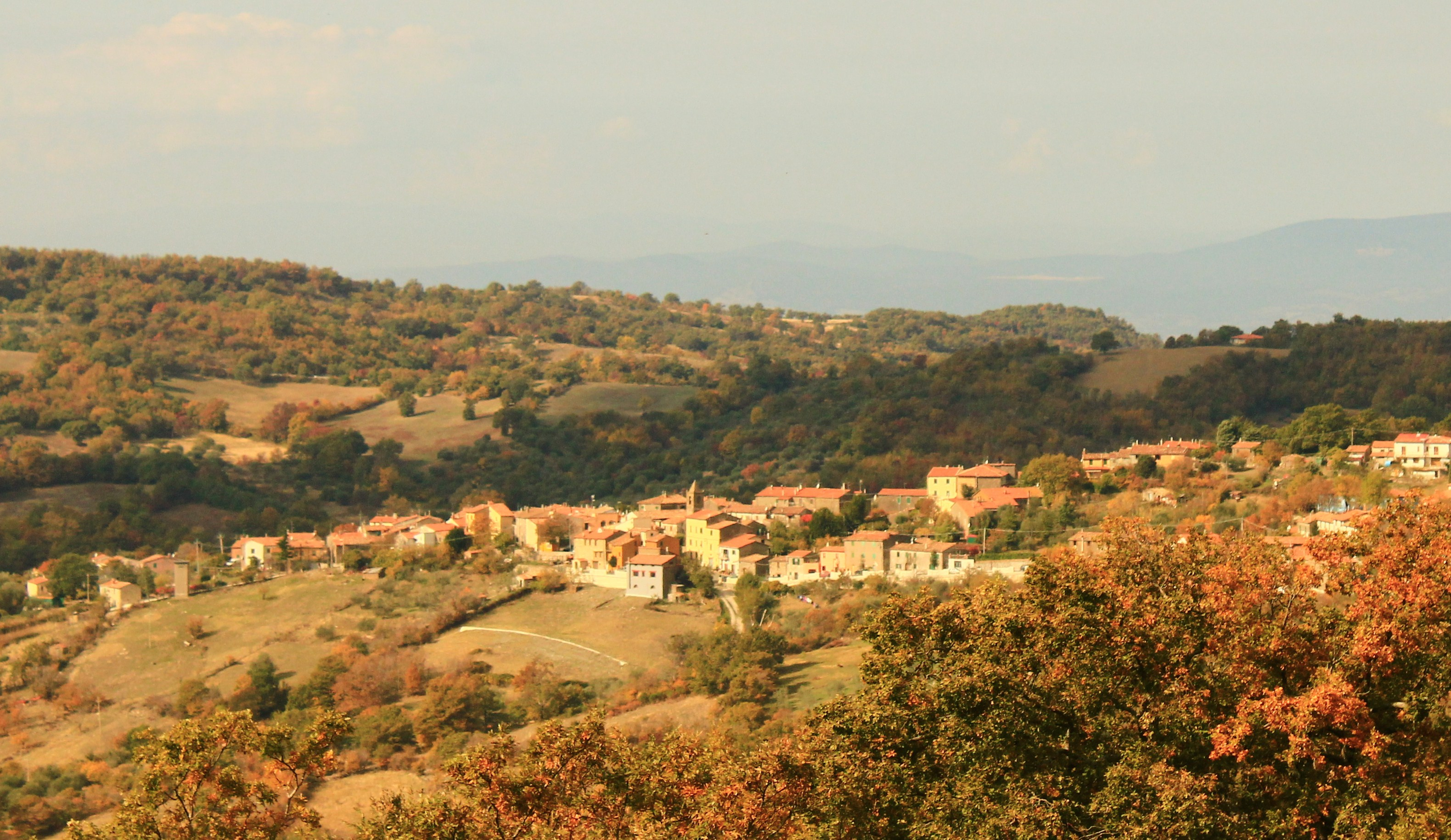
- View of Vallerona

- Location of Vallerona in Italy
- Coordinates: 42°47′34″N 11°28′10″E
- Country: Italy
- Region: Tuscany
- Province: Grosseto (GR)
- Comune: Roccalbegna
- Elevation: 569 m (1,867 ft)

Population (2011)
  - Total: 243
- Demonym: Valleronesi
- Time zone: UTC+1 (CET)
  - Summer (DST): UTC+2 (CEST)
- Postal code: 58053
- Dialing code: (+39) 0564

Vallerona is a village in Tuscany, central Italy, administratively a frazione of the comune of Roccalbegna, province of Grosseto, in the southern area of Mount Amiata. At the time of the 2001 census its population amounted to 219.

Vallerona is about 36 km from Grosseto and 6 km from Roccalbegna. The palio dei somarelli (donkeys) takes place every year in Vallerona.

== Main sights ==
- San Pio I, main parish of the village, it was built in 1641.

== See also ==
- Cana, Tuscany
- Santa Caterina, Roccalbegna
- Triana, Tuscany
