= Santa Caterina, Roccalbegna =

Santa Caterina
- Frazione
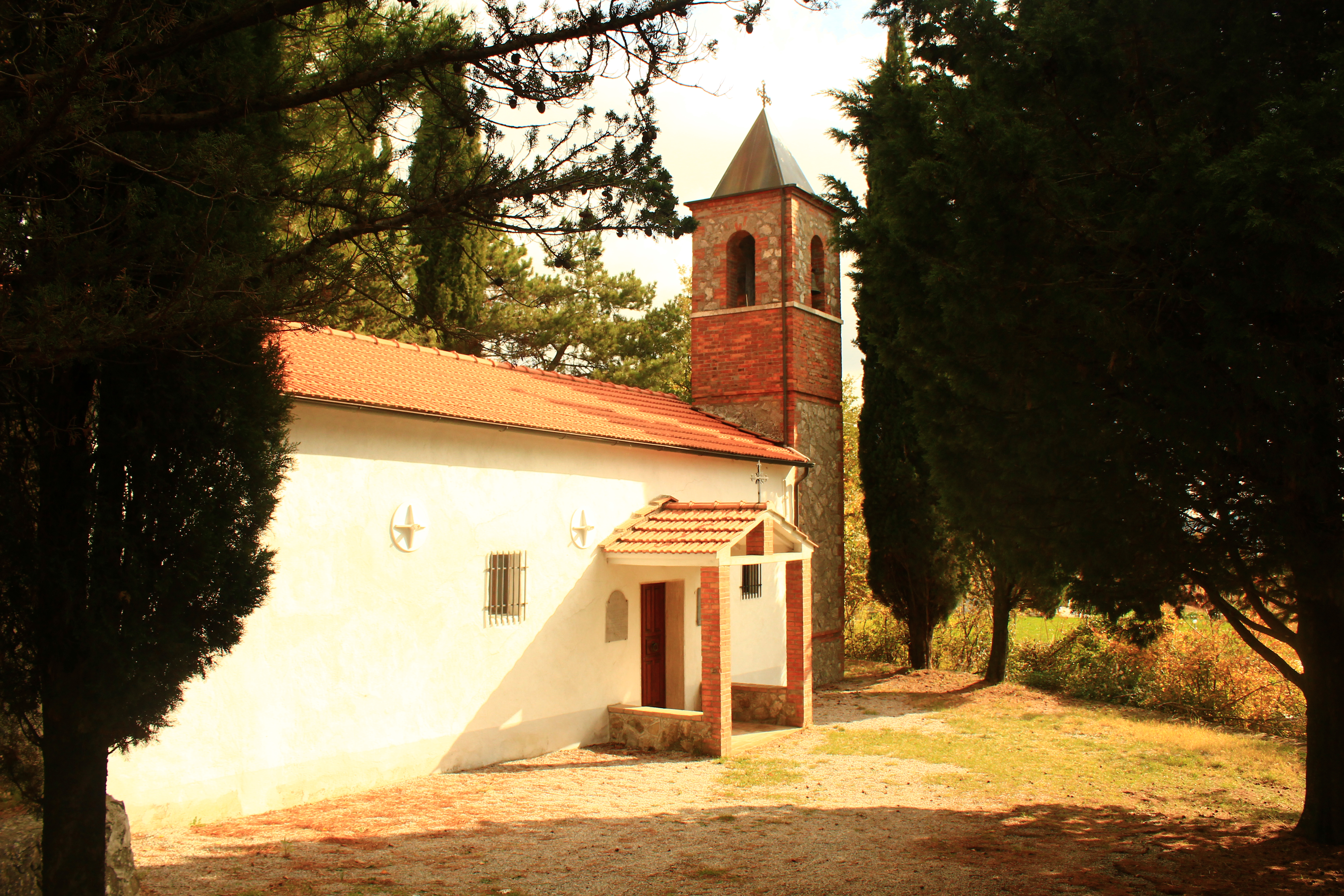
- The church of Santa Caterina delle Ruote

- Location of Santa Caterina in Italy
- Coordinates: 42°47′14″N 11°29′10″E
- Country: Italy
- Region: Tuscany
- Province: Grosseto (GR)
- Comune: Roccalbegna
- Elevation: 675 m (2,215 ft)

Population (2011)
  - Total: 272
- Demonym: Santacaterinesi
- Time zone: UTC+1 (CET)
  - Summer (DST): UTC+2 (CEST)
- Postal code: 58053
- Dialing code: (+39) 0564

Santa Caterina is a village in Tuscany, central Italy, administratively a frazione of the comune of Roccalbegna, province of Grosseto, in the southern area of Mount Amiata. At the time of the 2001 census its population amounted to 110.

Santa Caterina is about 40 km from Grosseto and 3 km from Roccalbegna.

== Geography ==
Santa Caterina is a village in the hilly inland of the Maremma, situated on the slopes dividing the Albegna and Ombrone valleys. The settlement is traversed by the Fosso Borretto and lies approximately 40 km from Grosseto and less than 4 km from the municipal centre. Formed through the amalgamation of several smaller settlements, the village retains a distinct division into districts (contrade), including Case Galli, Case Pereti, Case Rossi, Case Saloni, Case Sarti, I Casini, Il Cecio, Il Pilocco, La Croce, La Pianona, La Posta, Le Campane, and Le Querciolaie.

== History ==
The village was first mentioned in 1594 and originated as an agricultural settlement, consisting of scattered houses and farms that gradually coalesced into a single community. It began to expand in the 17th century and experienced significant growth in the late 19th century, when new clusters of houses were added to the older hamlets—Il Cecio, La Croce, and Il Pilocco—by shepherds, woodcutters, and charcoal makers migrating from Casentino. The most recent hamlet, La Pianona, dates to 1880.

== Main sights ==
=== Chapel of Santa Caterina delle Ruote ===
The chapel of Santa Caterina delle Ruote (Saint Catherine of the Wheels) is a 16th-century church built in gratitude to the Alexandrian martyr, commemorating the historical event of 25 November 1555, when the men of Roccalbegna successfully resisted and drove out the French army allied with Siena. It was renovated and expanded in 1960.

=== Church of Saint Catherine ===
The church of Saint Catherine serves as the modern parish church of the village, inheriting the functions of the 16th-century chapel. It is located in the La Posta hamlet and was originally built in 1960. The first building featured an asbestos roof, which sparked debate within the local community and calls for its removal. This structure was demolished in 2017, and a new church, with an adjoining rectory, was constructed based on a design by architect Letizia Pizzetti.

=== Museum ===
The Focarazza Museum, located in Santa Caterina, is an ethnographic museum inaugurated in 1987 and renovated in 2005. It is dedicated to documenting local work and traditions, with particular focus on the fire ritual of Focarazza.

== See also ==
- Cana, Tuscany
- Triana, Tuscany
- Vallerona
