= Bagni San Filippo =

Hot spring in Castiglione d'Orcia, Italy

Coordinates: 42°55′48″N 11°42′05″E

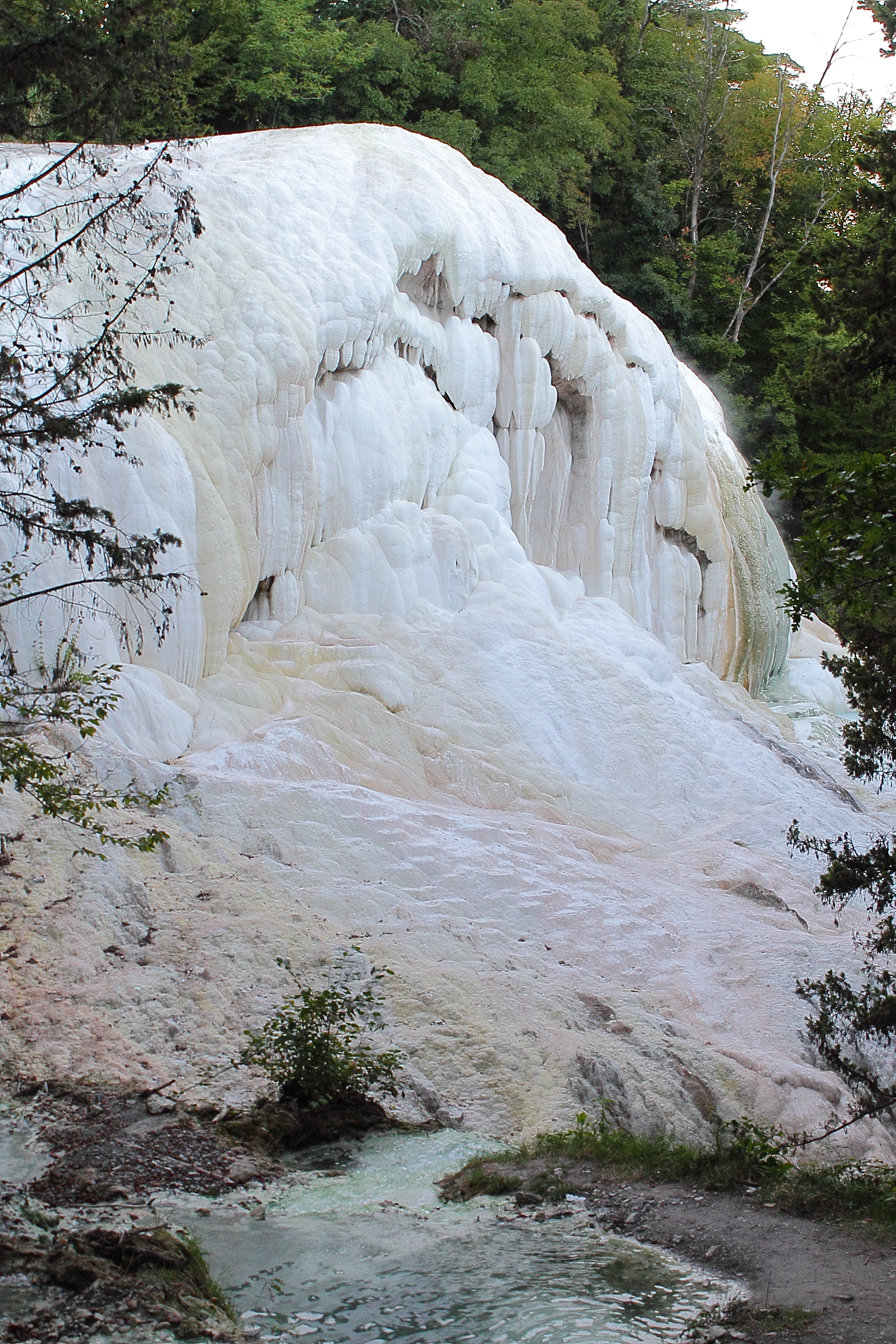
Calcium deposits on a waterfall at Bagni San Filippo

Bagni San Filippo is an area in the municipality of Castiglione d'Orcia in the Province of Siena, Italy, not far from Monte Amiata. It is a small hot spring containing calcium carbonate deposits, which form white concretions and waterfalls. The name derives from that of St Philip Benizi, who was a prior of the Servite order, and who lived as a hermit here in the thirteenth century. The grotto is open to visitors.
