= Santa Maria Maddalena, Castiglione d'Orcia =

Church in Castiglione d'Orcia, Italy

Coordinates: 43.0066°N 11.6171°E

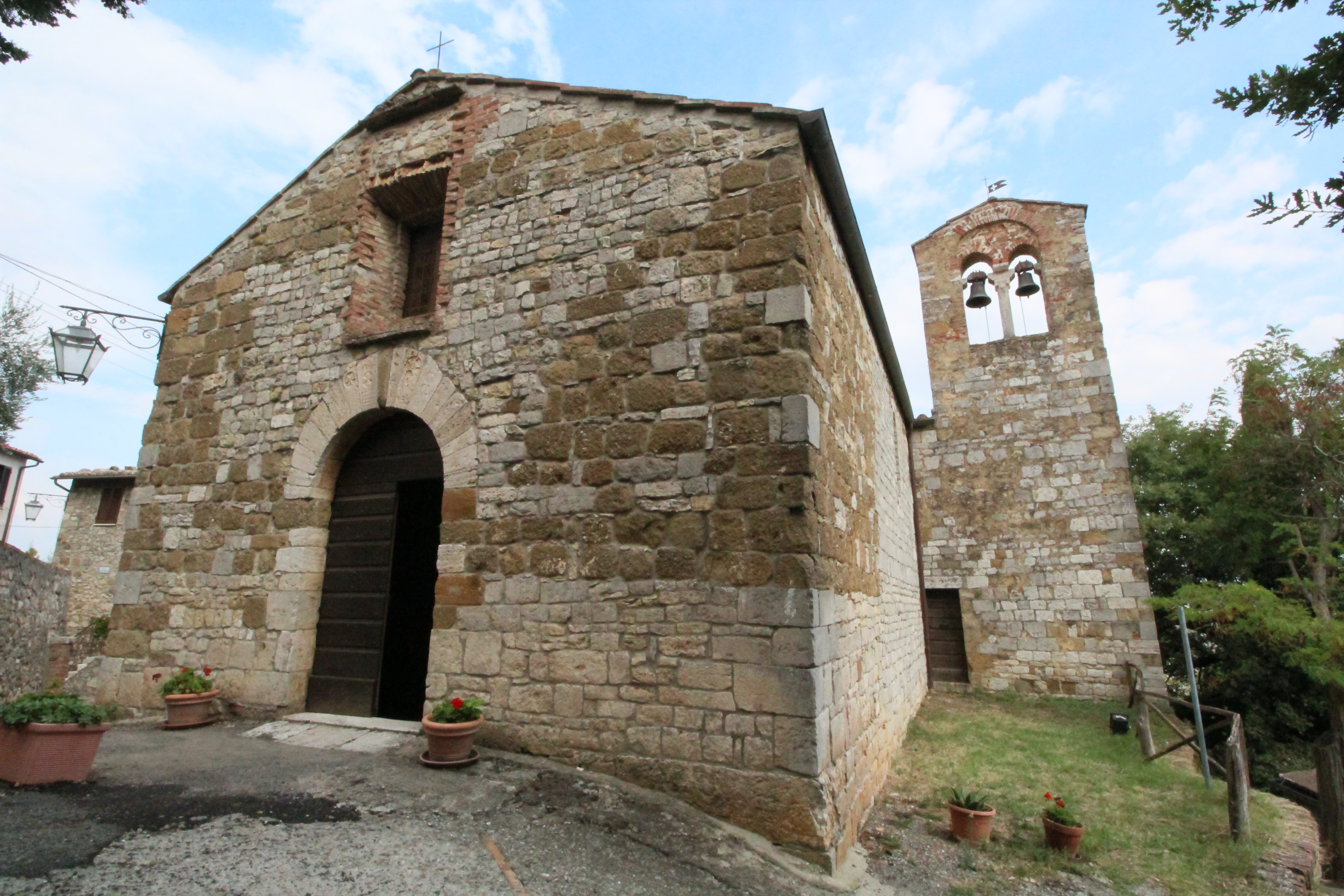
Exterior of the church Santa Maria Maddalena

Santa Maria Maddalena is a church in Castiglione d'Orcia, Tuscany, central Italy.

The church, in Romanesque style, has a single nave, ending in a semicircular apse, and a 12th-century bell tower. The facade dates to the 13th century.
