= Rocca d'Orcia =

- Frazione
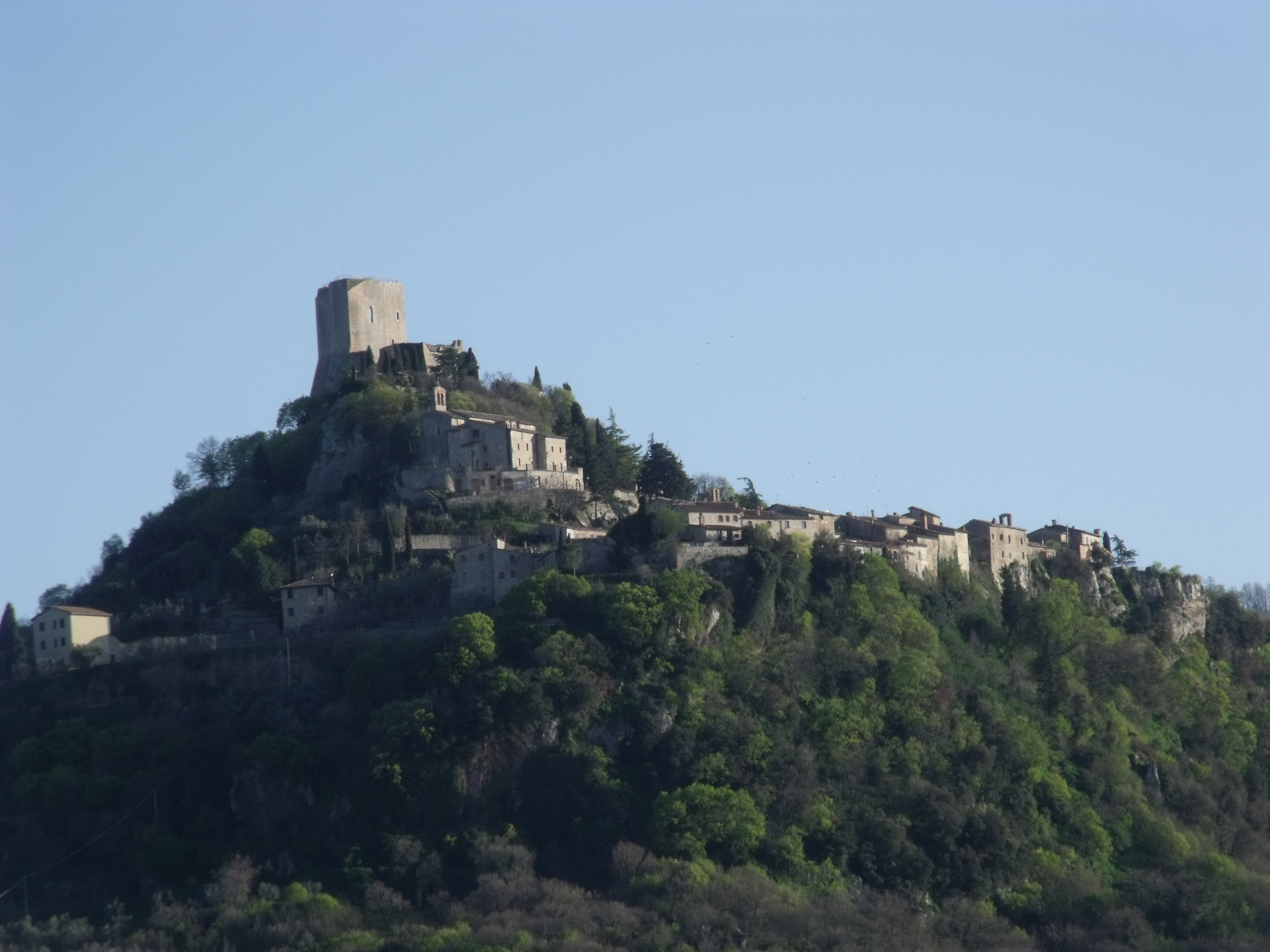
- View of Rocca d'Orcia

- Location of Rocca d'Orcia in Italy
- Coordinates: 43°00′39″N 11°36′51″E
- Country: Italy
- Region: Tuscany
- Province: Siena (SI)
- Comune: Castiglione d'Orcia
- Elevation: 510 m (1,670 ft)

Population (2011)
  - Total: 34
- Demonym: Rocchigiani
- Time zone: UTC+1 (CET)
  - Summer (DST): UTC+2 (CEST)

Rocca d'Orcia is a village in Tuscany, central Italy, administratively a frazione of the comune of Castiglione d'Orcia, province of Siena. At the time of the 2001 census its population was 47.

Rocca d'Orcia is about 43 km from Siena and 1 km from Castiglione d'Orcia.
