= Bagnore =

- Frazione
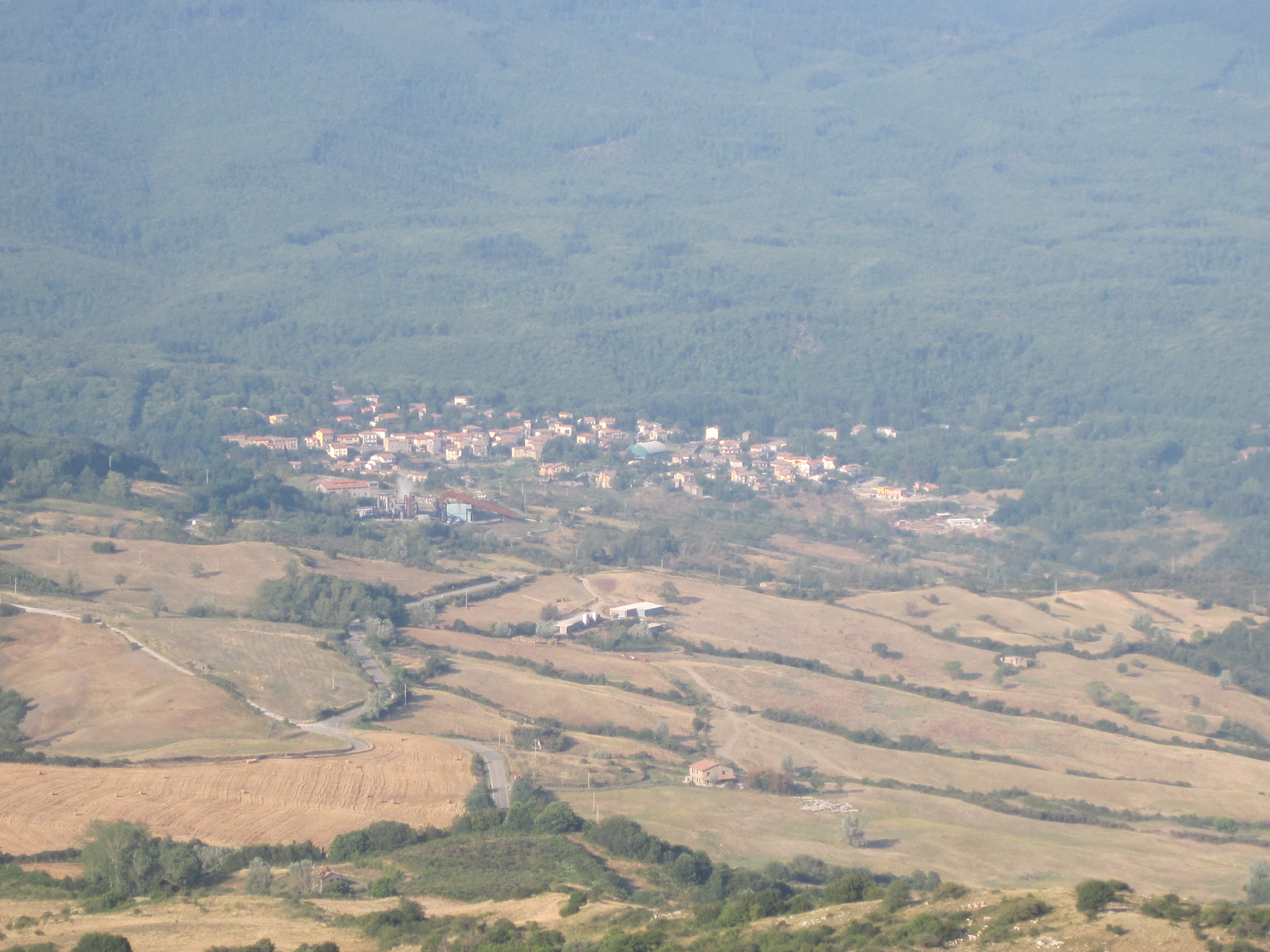
- View of Bagnore

- Location of Bagnore in Italy
- Coordinates: 42°50′50″N 11°34′4″E
- Country: Italy
- Region: Tuscany
- Province: Grosseto (GR)
- Comune: Santa Fiora
- Elevation: 780 m (2,560 ft)

Population (2011)
  - Total: 395
- Demonym(s): Bagnoresi, Bagnorai
- Time zone: UTC+1 (CET)
  - Summer (DST): UTC+2 (CEST)
- Postal code: 58037
- Dialing code: (+39) 0564

Bagnore (Italian: [ˈbaɲɲore]) is a village in Tuscany, central Italy, administratively a frazione of the comune of Santa Fiora, province of Grosseto. At the time of the 2001 census its population amounted to 420.

Bagnore is about 60 km from Grosseto and 2 km from Santa Fiora, and it is situated along the provincial road which links Santa Fiora to Arcidosso, in the southern side of Monte Amiata. Bagnore is well known for its geothermal activity. The springs of Acquaforte were very popular during the 19th century and they were awarded at the Universal Exposition in Paris in 1900. Nowadays the springs no longer exist. A large geothermal power plant for the exploitation of the subsoil was built in 1997, designed by architect Stefano Boeri.

The village is also known as the place of death of the preacher David Lazzaretti.

== Main sights ==
- Nostra Signora del Sacro Cuore (20th century), main parish church of the village, it was built in 1985 and designed by engineer Ernesto Ganelli.
- Old church of Bagnore, a little chapel where Lazzaretti died in 1878.

== Bibliography ==
- Lucio Niccolai, Santa Fiora. Invito alla scoperta del centro storico e del territorio, Effigi, Arcidosso, 2009.
