= Saragiolo =

- Frazione
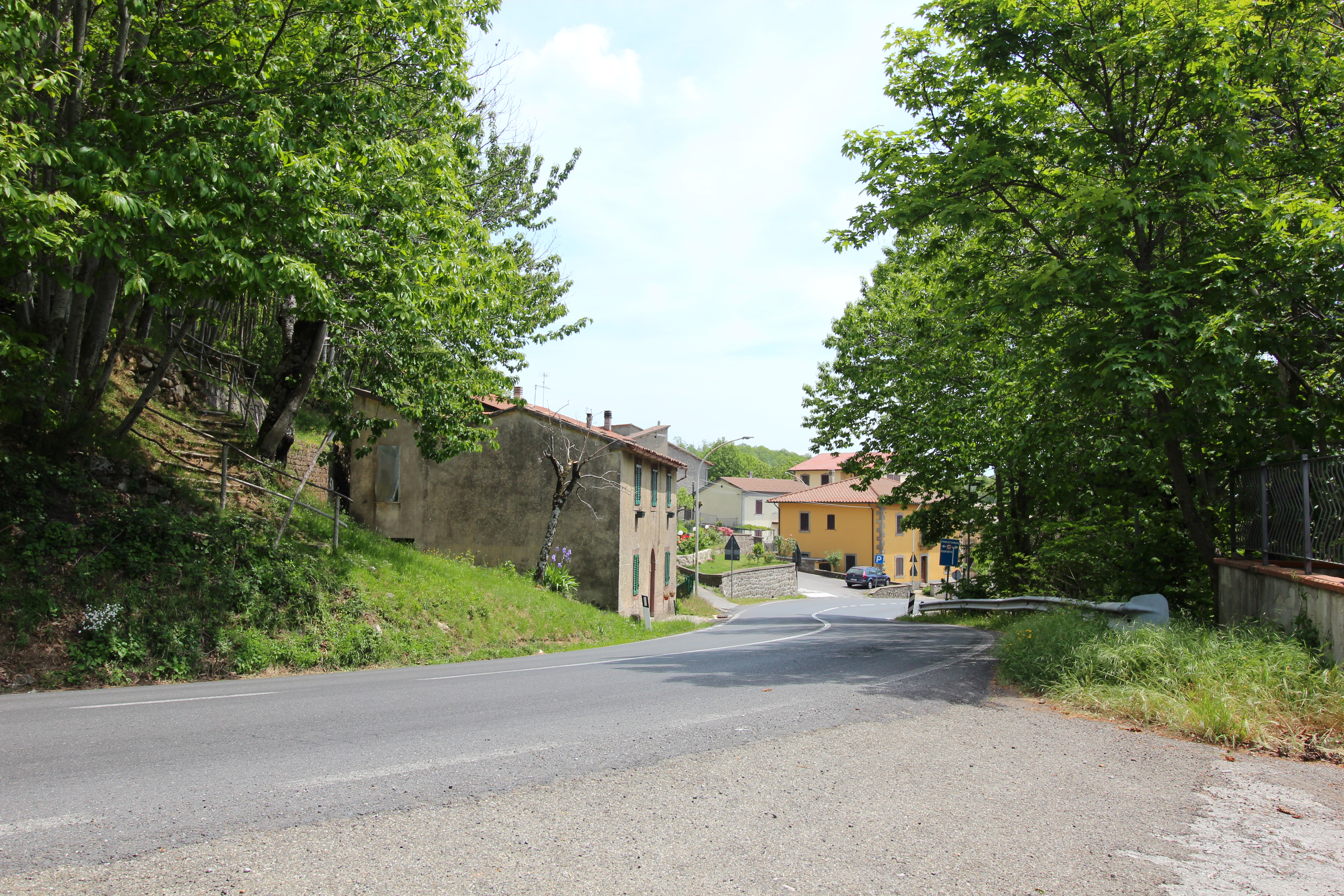

- Location of Saragiolo in Italy
- Coordinates: 42°50′7″N 11°38′37″E
- Country: Italy
- Region: Tuscany
- Province: Siena (SI)
- Comune: Piancastagnaio
- Elevation: 901 m (2,956 ft)

Population (2011)
  - Total: 352
- Time zone: UTC+1 (CET)
  - Summer (DST): UTC+2 (CEST)

Saragiolo is a village in Tuscany, central Italy, administratively a frazione of the comune of Piancastagnaio, province of Siena. At the time of the 2001 census its population was 369.

Saragiolo is about 90 km from Siena and 5 km from Piancastagnaio.
