= Ernesto Balducci =

Italian Catholic priest and peace activist

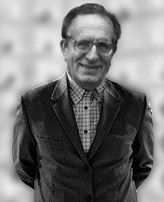
Ernesto Balducci

Ernesto Balducci (6 August 1922 – 25 April 1992) was an Italian Catholic priest and peace activist.

== Biography ==
Balducci was born in Santa Fiora, Tuscany, Italy as the eldest of four children.

When he was twelve, his father was laid off and the Scolopi, a Catholic religious order dedicated to the education of the poor, offered him a free place in seminary. He studied theology at Rome, then Letters and Philosophy at Florence. He was ordained as a priest in 1945 and was part of the Piarist religious institute.

=== Work in Florence ===
The foundation of the Centro d'Impegno Cristiano "Cenacolo" (Centre for Christian Commitment) in 1952 gave him the chance to intensify both his friendship with the charismatic mayor of Florence Giorgio La Pira, and his relationship with the author-priest Lorenzo Milani and the disciples of Jacques Maritain, known as the 'Little Brothers'. In 1958 Balducci founded the monthly review Testimonianze ("Testimonies"), which he directed for 34 years. In 1963 he openly defended the first Italian conscientious objector, Giuseppe Gozzini. His articles, and the subsequent trial, gave the bishop of Florence, monsignor Florit, the opportunity to "exile" Balducci. He stayed in Rome, very near the Second Vatican Council, until 1965 when, thanks to the direct intervention of Pope Paul VI, he went back to Tuscany. Not in Florence, however, where bishop Florit was still involved in his confrontation against La Pira, but at the abbey named Badia Fiesolana, two hundred yards from the border of the diocese of Florence.

Despite the isolation of the abbey, he had less and less time for his studies, as most of his days were taken up by the magazine Testimonianze, by the publishing house "Cultura della pace", ("Peace culture"), by his cooperation with daily papers and other periodical and by his direct and unflagging attendance at dozens of demonstrations and debates all over Italy.

=== Campaigning ===
He campaigned against the grounds of war, both before and after the Gulf War, and used the five hundredth anniversary in 1992 of the Christopher Columbus' discovery of the Americas, as the occasion to put the very foundations of modernity in question, and these campaigns became a point of reference for the large Italian peace movement.

It was while returning from one of these debates that Ernesto Balducci was involved in a car accident. He was admitted to hospital in coma, and died on 25 April 1992.

== The Planetary Human ==
Balducci analysed religions in relation to their capacity to be or not to be sources of a historic salvation. A salvation that does not remain in the alienating extra-historic and existential level.

The most modern themes of the Protestant theology come together in this reflection, from Karl Barth to Dietrich Bonhoeffer, with their intention of dividing religion and faith and overturning the point of view focused on God for showing up the human, instead.

In Balducci's view, the religions are the millenary legacy of cultural particularisms, as ideological, political, cultural and spiritual cohesion tools for cultural monads that, however, have lost their individuality. By facing up to the apocalyptic threats of modern war, now religions have two possible functions. Either a regressive function of protective recall to particular identities, or a prophetic ferment function for the transaction to the "planetary era". A ferment in deeper affinity with their very founding intuitions.

According to Balducci, the reclamation of religious identities has to be based on a lay approach to the peace question in order to bring into play each of the various memories of mankind. All this without abandoning certain universal achievements of the Western culture, like the principle of the preeminence of conscience with respect to any law, the correlative principle of the State of Right and the scientific method.

The synthesis of the "Planetary Human" aims to involve disparate subjects in the name of a fundamental subjectivity that identifies itself with the species.

The crisis of modernity drives Balducci to define the terms of a newly-grounded social contract of the world community. The reason, stripped of the Western people's "hyperbolic subjectivity", plays a fundamental role, so far.

By taking the suggestions of Ernesto de Martino, Balducci believes that the long "prehistory" of narrow communication among cultural "islands", in which the fear of the different has been a reflex that has cemented the tribe, is over. Even the aggressiveness against the other groups made sense as long as there were not the unifying frameworks of the planet. But the menaces to the survival of the human species unify the destiny of everyone. The mankind, from the "homination phase", goes on to the planetarization (globalization) phase.

Balducci observes that Anthropology - originally based on the ontology of the "difference" (the others and us, peoples of culture and peoples of nature, civilized and primitives) - then discovered the possibility of different ways to be humans in the time and the space. By repudiating its own earlier assumptions, Anthropology recognizes the longing of each peculiar human expression towards a universal rule that joins humans, and them with nature. This is the sense that Balducci catches in various cultural itineraries: the structuralism of Claude Lévi-Strauss, the "ecology of mind" of Gregory Bateson, the generative grammar of Noam Chomsky.

Balducci bases his thought on such yearning towards the universal. Many of its symbolizations are about the dialectic between particular and universal dimensions of the human.

He borrows from Ernst Bloch the dialectic between the "cultured human" (homo editus) and the "hidden human" (homo absconditus), a dialectic between the being and the being able to of the human, an aspiration that is a transcendence without transcending, a «transcendence in the immanence»

The Balducci crossing appears to be a sort of anthropologic teleology which represents an evolutionary trend that the human being can support or disclaim in its path. The reason, as said by Balducci, finds a brand-new categorical imperative:

«Act only according to that maxim by which you can at the same time will that the human species would find the reasons and the guarantees of its survival» (in La terra del tramonto).

Balducci recognized in the declining freedom of action of states and in the growth of the cosmopolitan right an element deeply rooted in the evolutionary laws of human species. The faith in Man (a Pierre Teilhard de Chardin concept), the consideration that our species has always creatively got over many severe and extreme challenges, the chance of the "planetary human": all this things make sense to Balducci if the sense of belonging with a supranational community will generate a planetary political project. A project that matches the world community, an entity arising «on the strength of the evolutionary laws of the species, the same laws that lead from the tribe to the city, from the city to the nation-state.»

In order to decipher the momentum towards the establishment of a world community, Balducci recalls two categories of the natural law: the pactum unionis and the pactum subjectionis.

The former momentum is identified in view of the anthropologic pacifism, which horizon is a society that is made compact by relationships of spontaneous reciprocity and by the preferential option for non-violence.

The second momentum relies on the perspective of the political realism, oriented to extend to the entire planet the process of unification relying upon the monopoly on the legitimate use of physical force. The dialectic between these two momentums has to give birth to the «new child» of the new era, the world community.

Novelty depends upon the womb of necessity. No wonder if there is the darkness on the intermediate stages of its birth. As Ernst Bloch wrote, "at the foot of the lighthouse, there is not light". (in La terra del tramonto)

== Publications ==
Balducci wrote 35 books including:

- Francesco d’Assisi
- John: The Transitional Pope
- Urge una escuela para la paz

== Legacy ==
The Ernesto Balducci Foundation was founded in 1995. The foundation looks after the archive of Balducci’s papers and has published some of his works, as well as supporting research into some of the issues he worked on. These issues included international conflict, the nuclear threat and global ecology.

== See also ==
- List of peace activists
