= Saglimbeni =

Saglimbeni is a surname. Notable people with the surname include:

- Mikael Saglimbeni (born 1940), Ethiopian cyclist
- Nick Saglimbeni, American photographer and filmmaker
- Rodolfo Saglimbeni (1962–2025), Venezuelan orchestra conductor

== See also ==
- Salimbeni (disambiguation)
