= Gallina, Castiglione d'Orcia =

Gallina
- Frazione
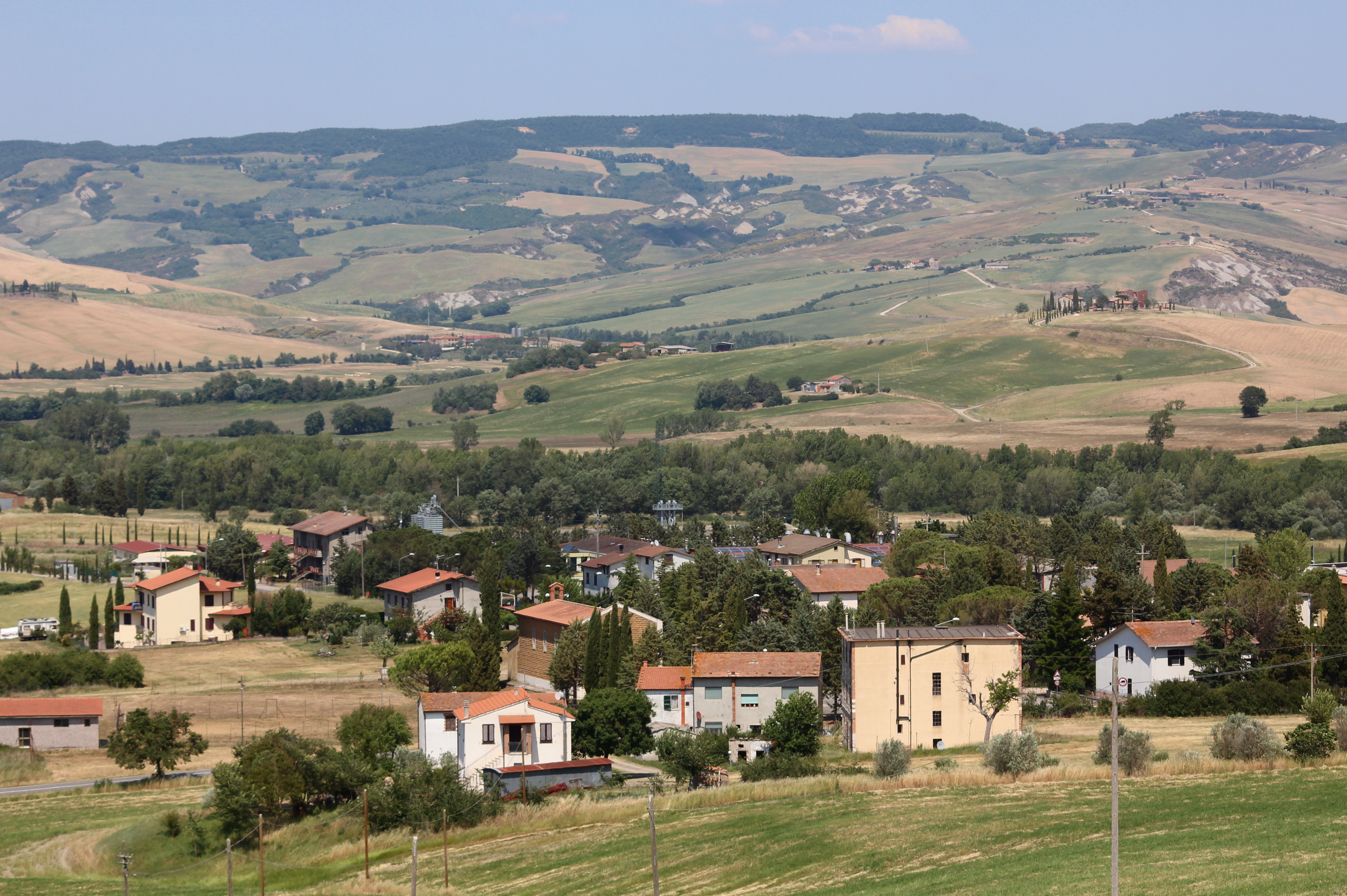
- View of Gallina

- Location of Gallina in Italy
- Coordinates: 43°00′2″N 11°40′59″E
- Country: Italy
- Region: Tuscany
- Province: Siena (SI)
- Comune: Castiglione d'Orcia
- Elevation: 316 m (1,037 ft)

Population (2011)
  - Total: 140
- Time zone: UTC+1 (CET)
  - Summer (DST): UTC+2 (CEST)

Gallina is a village in Tuscany, central Italy, administratively a frazione of the comune of Castiglione d'Orcia, province of Siena. At the time of the 2001 census its population was 157.

Gallina is about 54 km from Siena and 9 km from Castiglione d'Orcia.
