= Abbazia di San Salvatore =

8th-century abbey in Tuscany, Italy

Coordinates: 42°52′56.79″N 11°40′34.14″E

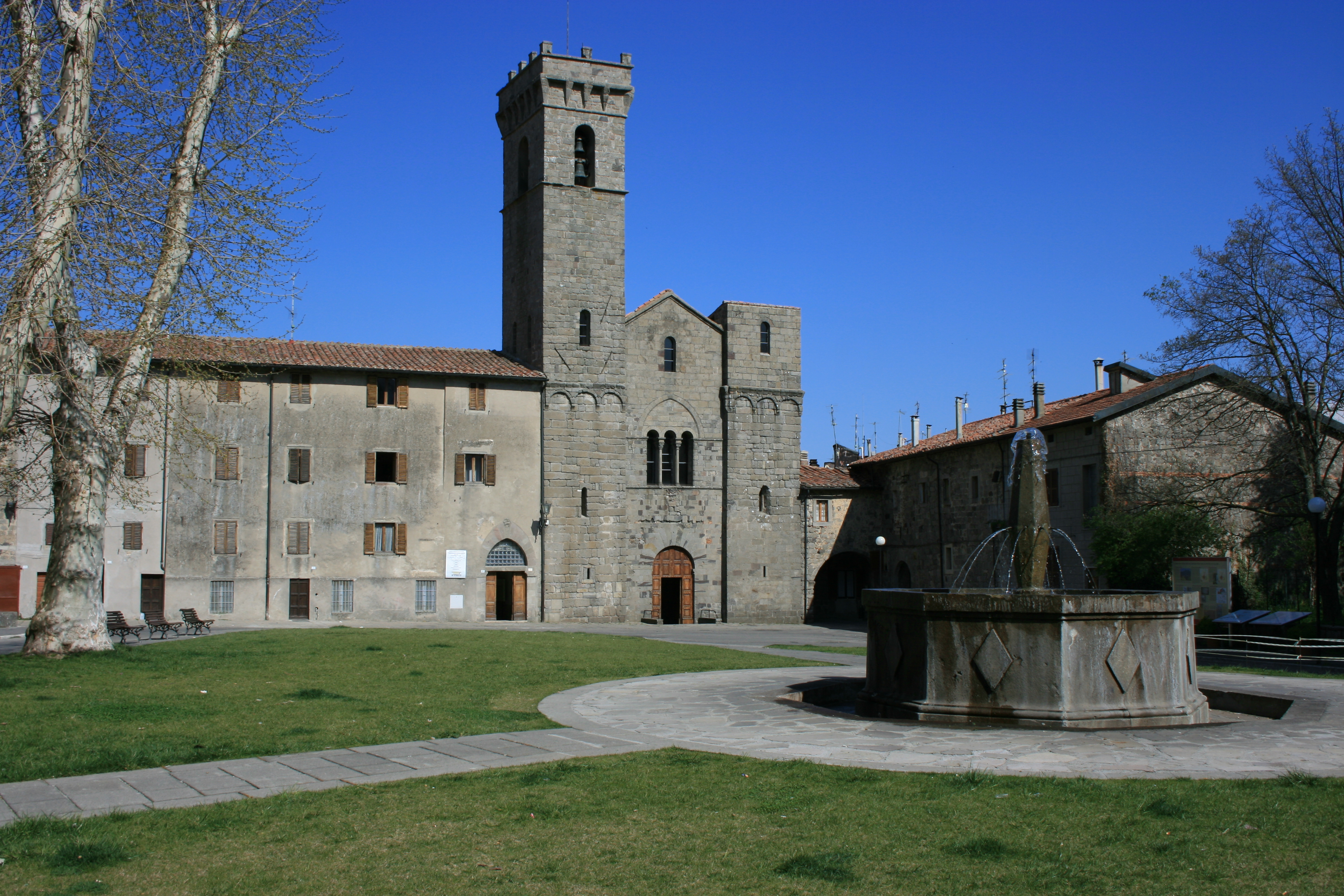
Remains of the abbey.

The Abbazia di San Salvatore or Abbadia San Salvatore is an abbey on the Monte Amiata, in the town of Abbadia San Salvatore, Tuscany, Italy, to which it gives its name.

The traditional account of its origin indicates that the Lombard king Ratchis founded the abbey in 743, entrusting it to the Benedictines. Later handed over to the Cistercians, the abbey played an important regional role, being often in conflict with the houses of the Aldobrandeschi and the Orsini, as well as other allies of the Holy Roman Emperors.

It is mentioned that in 816, Holy Roman emperor Louis assigned some freedom to the abbey to the election of their abbott the Monistero di San Salvatore di Monte Amiate.

The Codex Amiatinus was kept at the monastery from the 9th century until 1786 when it passed to the Laurentian Library in Florence.
