= Campiglia d'Orcia =

- Frazione
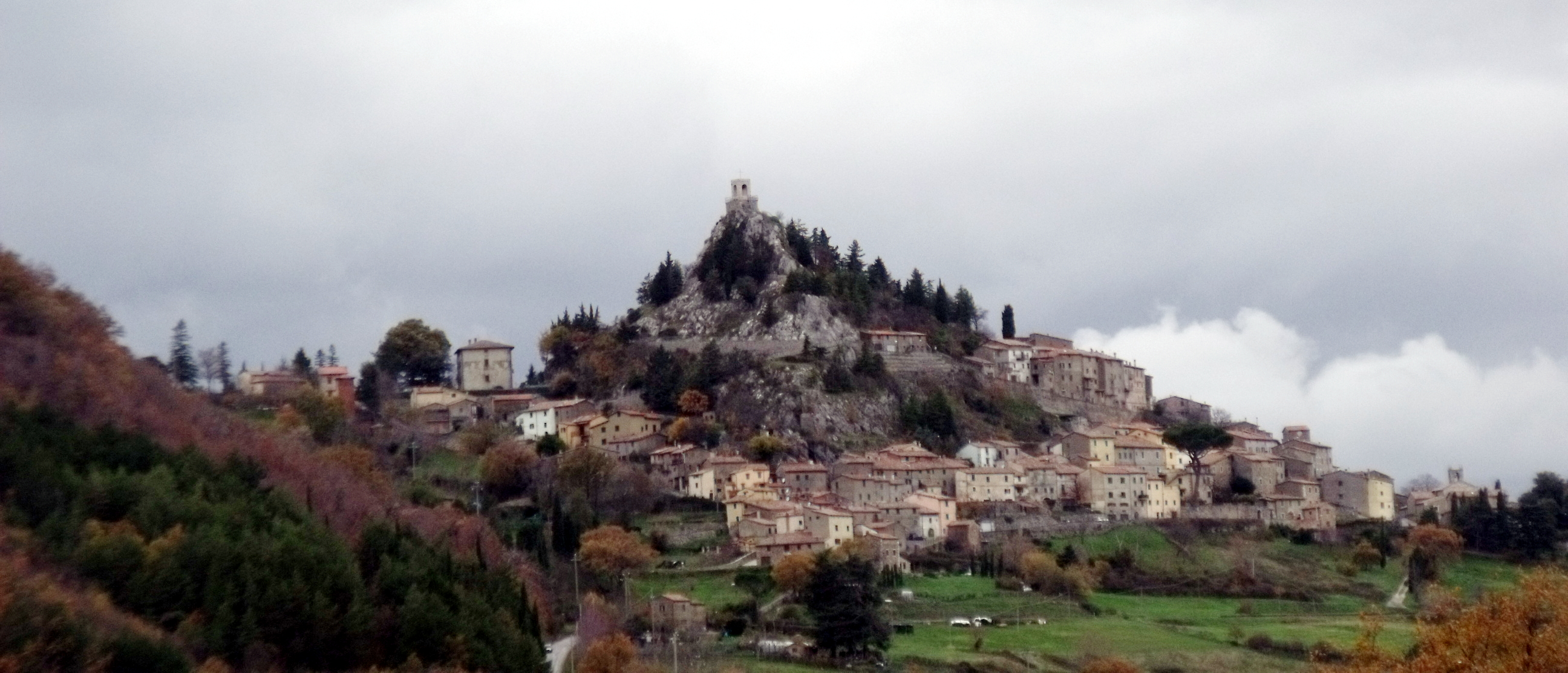
- View of Campiglia d'Orcia

- Location of Campiglia d'Orcia in Italy
- Coordinates: 42°57′00″N 11°40′00″E
- Country: Italy
- Region: Tuscany
- Province: Siena (SI)
- Comune: Castiglione d'Orcia
- Elevation: 810 m (2,660 ft)

Population (2011)
  - Total: 413
- Demonym: Campigliesi
- Time zone: UTC+1 (CET)
  - Summer (DST): UTC+2 (CEST)

Campiglia d'Orcia is a village in Tuscany, central Italy, administratively a frazione of the comune of Castiglione d'Orcia, province of Siena. At the time of the 2001 census its population was 599.

Campiglia d'Orcia is about 64 km from Siena and 13 km from .
