= Nasini =

Nasini is an Italian surname. Notable people with the surname include:

- Francesco Nasini (1611 or 1621–1695), Italian Baroque painter
- Giuseppe Nicola Nasini (1657–1736), Italian Baroque painter, son of Francesco

== See also ==
- Nalini
