= Roccalbegna =

- Comune
- Comune di Roccalbegna
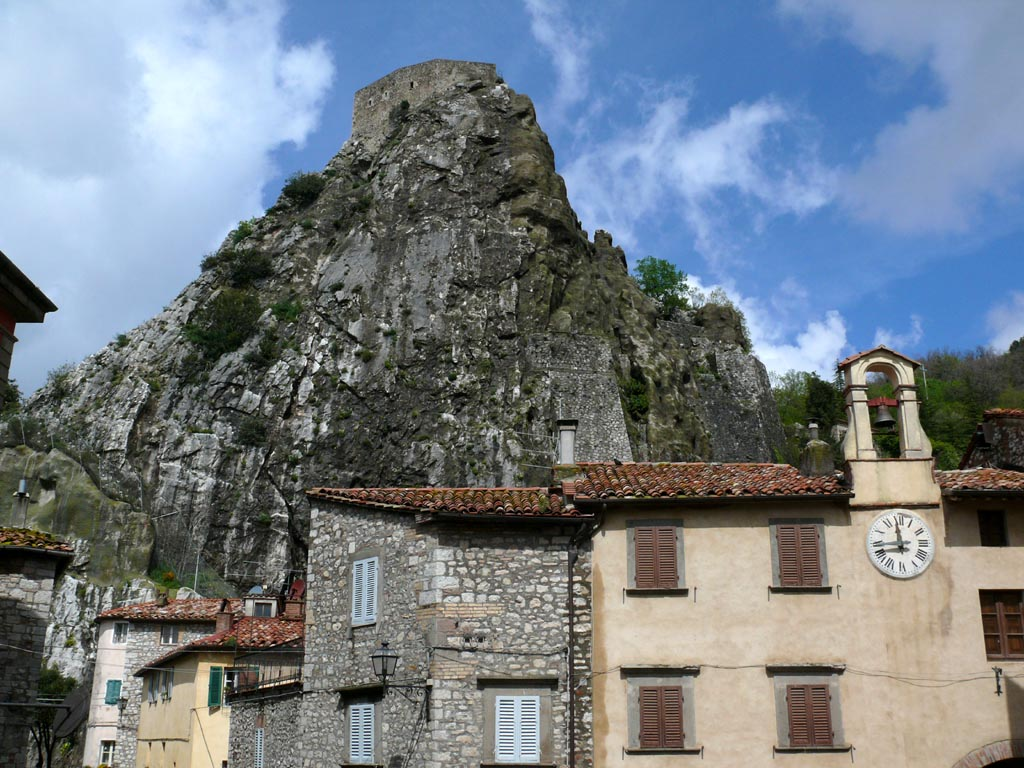

- Coat of arms

- Location within Italy Location within Tuscany
- Coordinates: 42°47′N 11°30′E
- Country: Italy
- Region: Tuscany
- Province: Grosseto (GR)
- Frazioni: Cana, Santa Caterina, Triana, Vallerona

Government
  - Mayor: Massimo Galli

Area
  - Total: 124.86 km^{2} (48.21 sq mi)
- Elevation: 522 m (1,713 ft)

Population (1 January 2022)
  - Total: 921
  - Density: 7.38/km^{2} (19.1/sq mi)
- Demonym(s): Roccalbegnini, Rocchigiani
- Time zone: UTC+1 (CET)
  - Summer (DST): UTC+2 (CEST)
- Postal code: 58053
- Dialing code: 0564
- Patron saint: St. Christopher
- Saint day: 25 July
- Website: Official website

Roccalbegna is a comune (municipality) in the Province of Grosseto in the Italian region Tuscany, located about 110 kilometres (68 mi) south of Florence and about 35 kilometres (22 mi) east of Grosseto.

== History ==
Roccalbegna was a fief of the Aldobrandeschi in the Middle Ages; later it was part of the Republic of Siena, until the latter's fall in the hands of the Medici, who sold the town to the County of Santa Fiora. In the 18th century it was returned to the Grand Duchy of Tuscany.

== Frazioni ==
The municipality is formed by the municipal seat of Roccalbegna and the villages (frazioni) of Cana, Santa Caterina, Triana and Vallerona.

== Main sights ==
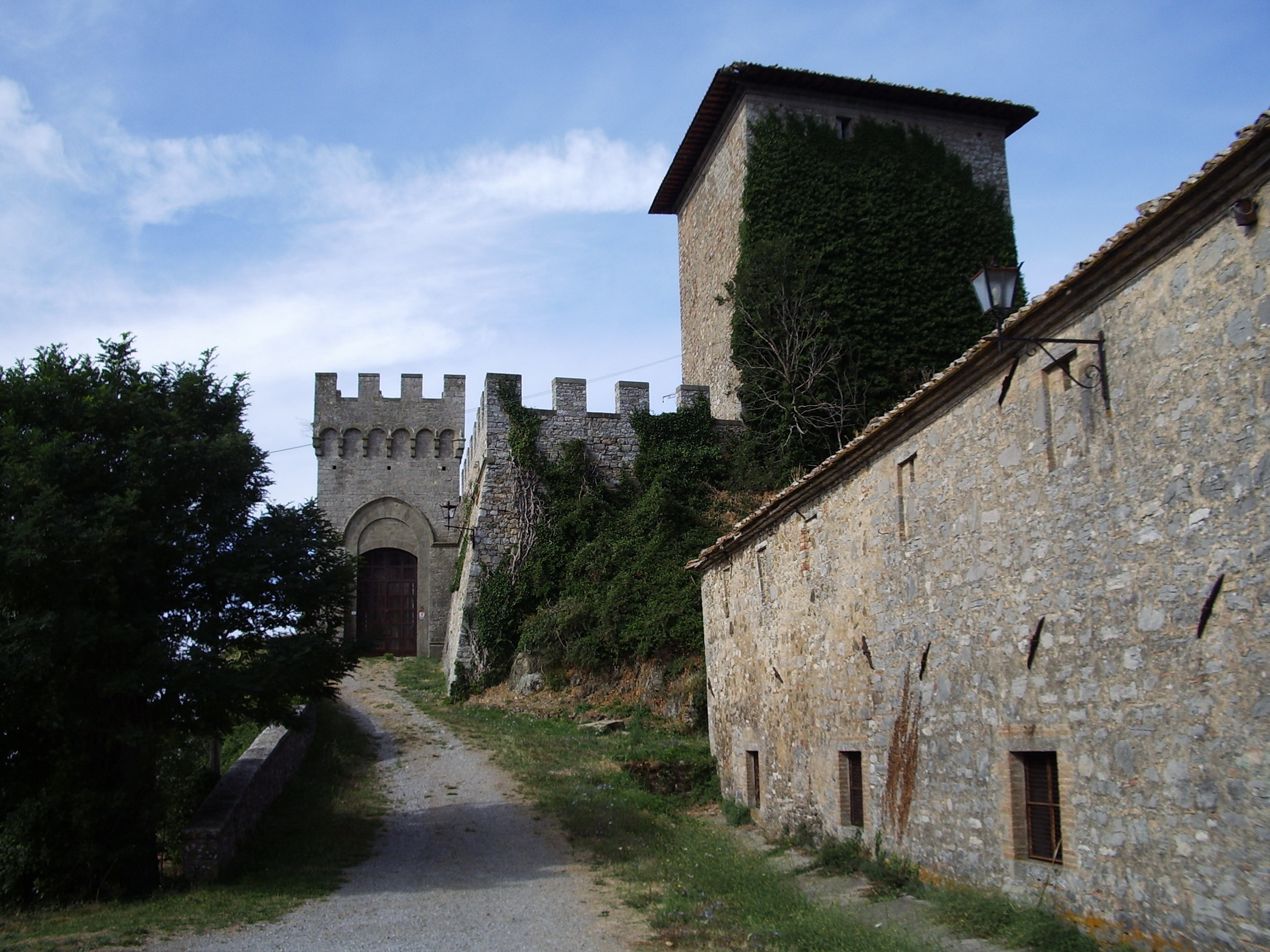
The Castle of Triana.

Roccalbegna is home to several notable fortifications, such as the Cassero Senese (built in the 13th century by the Aldobrandeschi, renovated in the 15th century) and the Rocca Aldobrandesca, located on the hill overlooking the town and the Albegna river (whence the town's name). Outside the town there is the large castle of Triana (known from 760), also owned by the Aldobrandeschi and then by the Sforza of Santa Fiora; it has maintained its medieval line of walls. The hamlet of Cana has also an Aldobrandeschi-built line of walls from the 13th century.

Also notable is the Romanesque-Gothic church of Santi Pietro e Paolo (13th-14th centuries, modified in the 18th century). It has a large Gothic portal surmounted by a rose window. It houses some parts of a polyptych by Ambrogio Lorenzetti (c. 1340), a Pietà by Alessandro Casolani and a 15th-century small fresc of Madonna with Saints.
