= Candido Amantini =

Italian Catholic priest (1914–1992)

Candido Amantini CP
- Church: Catholic Church

Orders
- Ordination: March 13, 1937

Personal details
- Born: Eraldo Ulisse Mauro Amantini; January 31, 1914 Bagnolo di Santa Fiora, Province of Grosseto, Tuscany, Italy
- Died: September 22, 1992 (aged 78) Rome
- Buried: Church of the Holy Stairs
- Parents: Giovanni Battista Amantini and Diolinda Fratini Amantini

Candido Amantini (January 31, 1914 – September 22, 1992) was an Italian Catholic priest and member of the Passionists. For 36 years, Amantini was the exorcist of the Diocese of Rome, stationed at the Pontifical Sanctuary of the Holy Stairs. He also taught Sacred Scripture and Moral Theology and wrote a book entitled Il Mistero di Maria, about the Virgin Mary.

== Life ==
Candido Amantini was born Eraldo Ulisse Mauro Amantini in Bagnolo di Santa Fiora, Province of Grosseto, Tuscany, the second of four children born to Giovanni Battista Amantini and Diolinda Fratini Amantini. He was baptized on February 7, 1914.

At age 12, he entered the Passionist Seminary in Rome (Nettuno) on October 26, 1926. At the age of 15, on October 9, 1929, he entered the novitiate of the Passionists at the Retreat of St Joseph on Mount Argentario. On October 23, he received the religious habit and was given the name Candido. On October 24, 1930, he made his temporary vows. Amantini was transferred to Tavernuzze, near Florence, where he completed Lyceum in 1936. Then he went to Vinchiana, to complete his studies in philosophy and theology.

On January 31, 1936, Amantini made his perpetual vows. Also in 1936, he was transferred to the Sanctuary of the Holy Staircase in Rome, to study for his licentiate in theology at the Pontifical University of St. Thomas Aquinas, Angelicum.

After a long illness, Amantini died at night on the feast of Saint Candido, his patron. Amantini was buried in Rome at the Verano Cemetery. The Roman Catholic Church has named him a Servant of God. His remains were transferred to the Church of the Holy Staircase on March 21, 2012.

== Bibliography ==
- Amantini, C. (1987). Il mistero di Maria (The Mystery of Mary). Frigento (AV) (2 ed.)
- Anonymous (2012). Servo di Dio Candido Amantini dell’Immacolata -Eraldo Amantini- Sacerdote Passionista (Servant of God Candido Amantini – Eraldo Amantini- Passionist Priest). http://www.santiebeati.it/dettaglio/95422
- Amorth, G. (2000). An Exorcist: More Stories, Ignatius Press.
- Amorth, G. (2002) L'esorcista della Scala Santa: Padre Candido Amantini (The Exorcist of the Church of the Holy Staircase: Fr. Candido Amantini). Il Crocifisso, Roma.
- Pagliaro, M.C. (2009). Il Pastore delle valli oscure. L’esorcista, P. Candido Amantini. (The Shepherd of Dark Valleys: The Exorcist, Fr. Candido Amantini). La Stella del Mare, Nettuno.
