= Sante Flora e Lucilla, Santa Fiora =

Sante Flora e Lucilla
- Pieve delle Sante Flora e Lucilla (Italian)
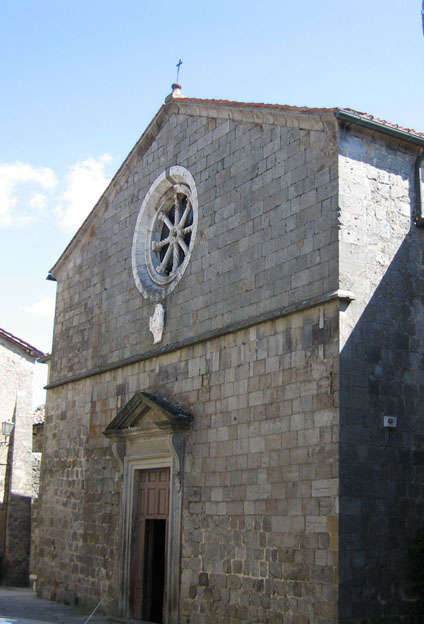
- Sante Flora e Lucilla
- 42°49′49.37″N 11°35′6.83″E
- Location: Santa Fiora, Tuscany
- Country: Italy
- Denomination: Roman Catholic
- Tradition: Latin Rite

History
- Status: Parish church historical pieve

Architecture
- Architectural type: Church
- Style: Romanesque, Renaissance
- Groundbreaking: early 12th century
- Completed: 15th century

Administration
- Diocese: Diocese of Pitigliano-Sovana-Orbetello

Sante Flora e Lucilla is a Roman Catholic parish church and former pieve in the comune of Santa Fiora, Province of Grosseto, region of Tuscany, Italy.

The first documentation of a church here dates to 1144. Above the stone portal is a Romanesque window. The interior has three naves and a wooden ceiling. The inside of the church has terra cotta decorations by Andrea della Robbia; these depict a Madonna della cintola, The Baptism of Jesus, a Last Supper and a triptych with a Coronation of the Virgin flanked by Saints Francis and Jerome.
