= Salimbeni =

Salimbeni is an Italian surname. People with this name include:

- Lorenzo and Jacopo Salimbeni (1374–c.1418 and 1370s–after 1426), Italian painters and brothers
- Lorenzo d'Alessandro da Sanseverino (c.1455 – 1503), also called Salimbeni, painter
- Ventura Salimbeni (1568 – 1613), painter and printmaker
- Felice Salimbeni (1712 – 1751), Italian soprano castrato

It may also refer to:

- The Salimbeni Prize, awarded for writings in art history

== See also ==
- Salimbene di Adam
- Saglimbeni, people with this surname
