= Piancastagnaio =

- Comune
- Comune di Piancastagnaio
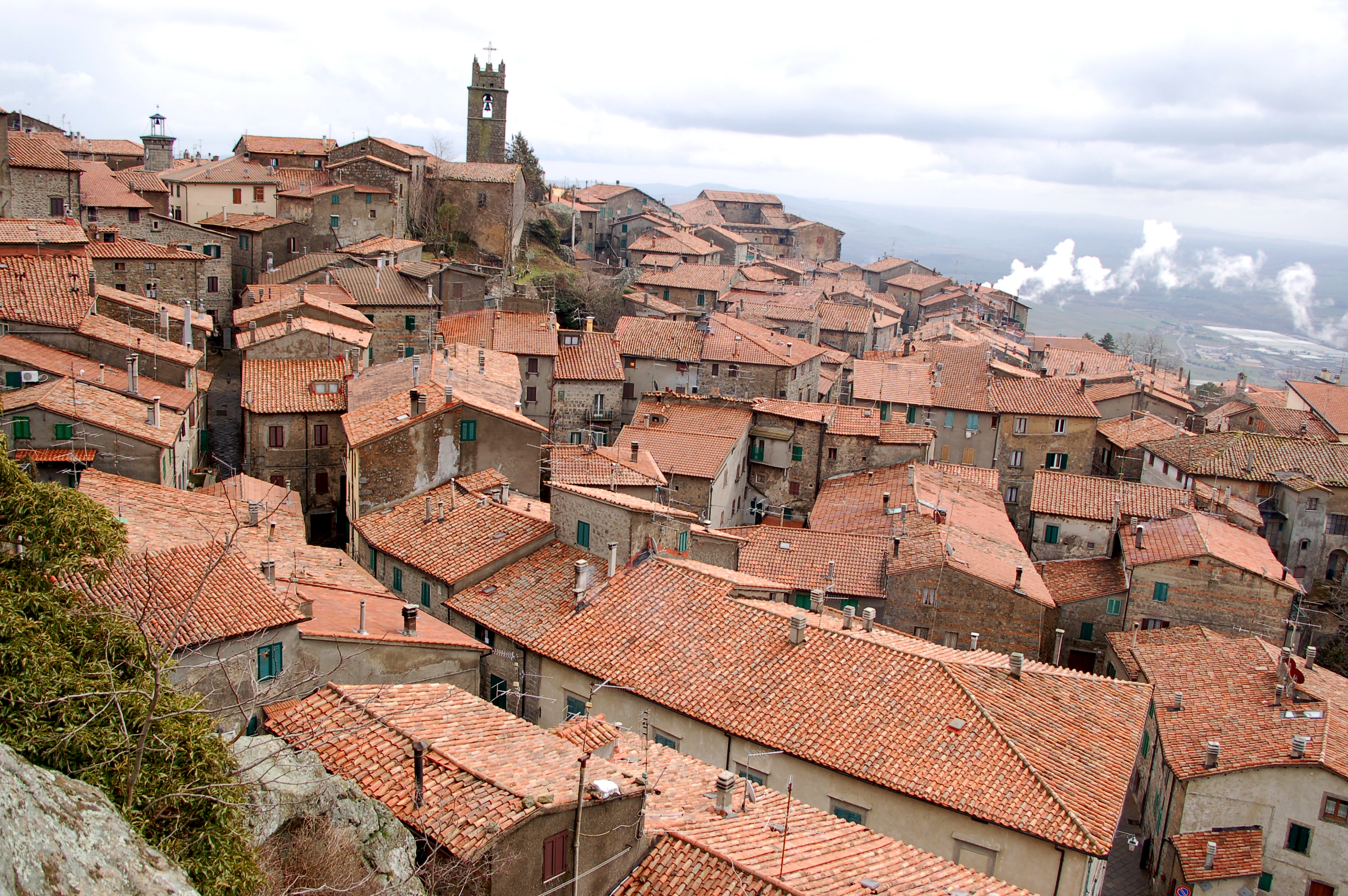

- Coat of arms

- Location within Italy Location within Tuscany
- Coordinates: 42°51′N 11°41′E
- Country: Italy
- Region: Tuscany
- Province: Siena (SI)
- Frazioni: Saragiolo

Government
  - Mayor: Luigi Vagaggini

Area
  - Total: 69.7 km^{2} (26.9 sq mi)
- Elevation: 772 m (2,533 ft)

Population (28 February 2017)
  - Total: 4,200
  - Density: 60/km^{2} (160/sq mi)
- Demonym: Pianesi
- Time zone: UTC+1 (CET)
  - Summer (DST): UTC+2 (CEST)
- Postal code: 53025
- Dialing code: 0577
- Website: Official website

Piancastagnaio is a comune (municipality) in the Province of Siena in the Italian region Tuscany, located about 110 kilometres (68 mi) southeast of Florence and about 60 kilometres (37 mi) southeast of Siena.

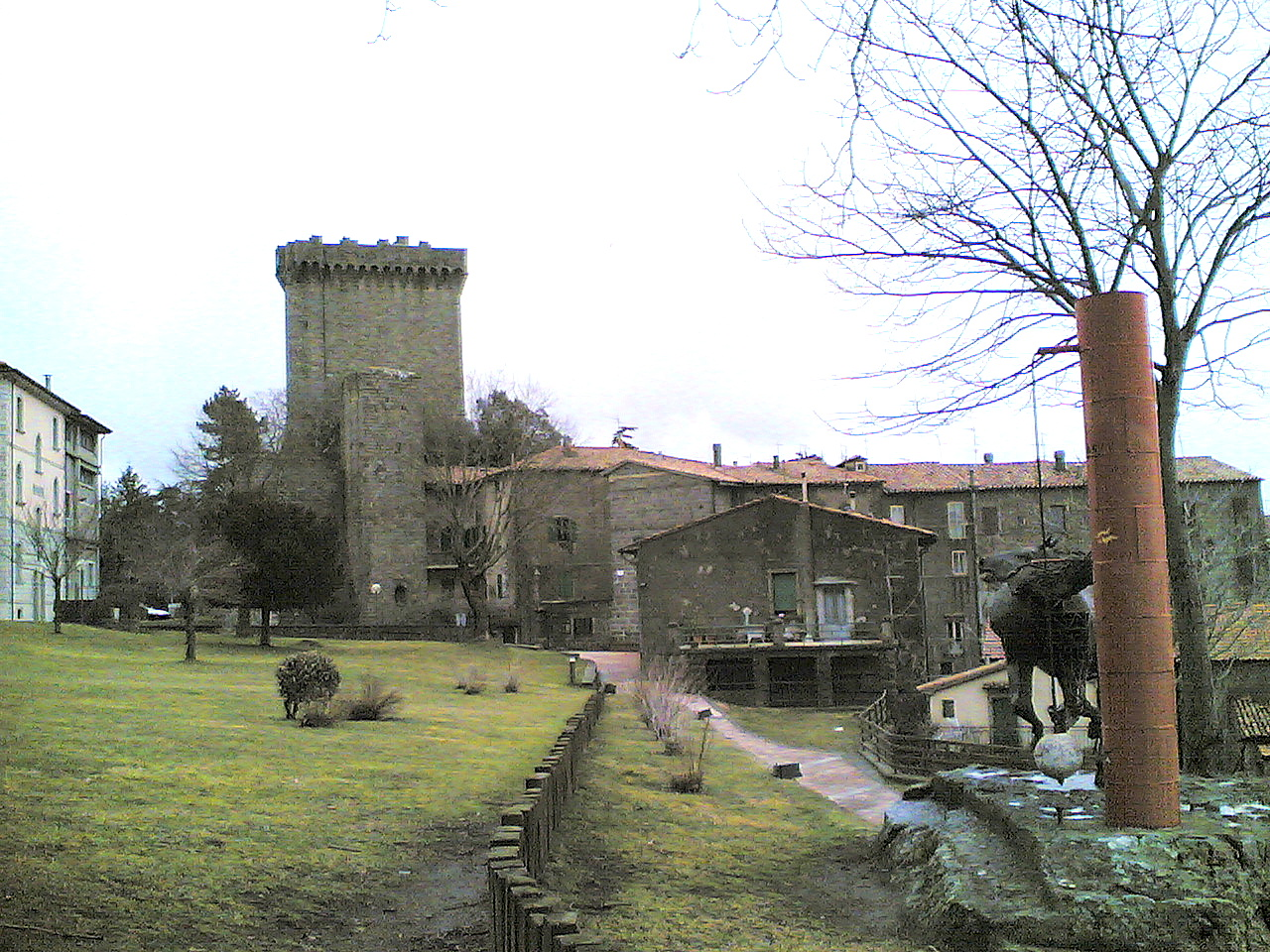
The public park and the castle in Piancastagnaio.

It is located on the Monte Amiata slopes.

The main attractions include the Pieve of Santa Maria Assunta, in Baroque style but existing from before 1188, the Palazzo Bourbon Del Monte and the Rocca Aldobrandesca ("Aldobrandeschi Castle").
