= Monte Amiata =

Lava dome in Tuscany, Italy

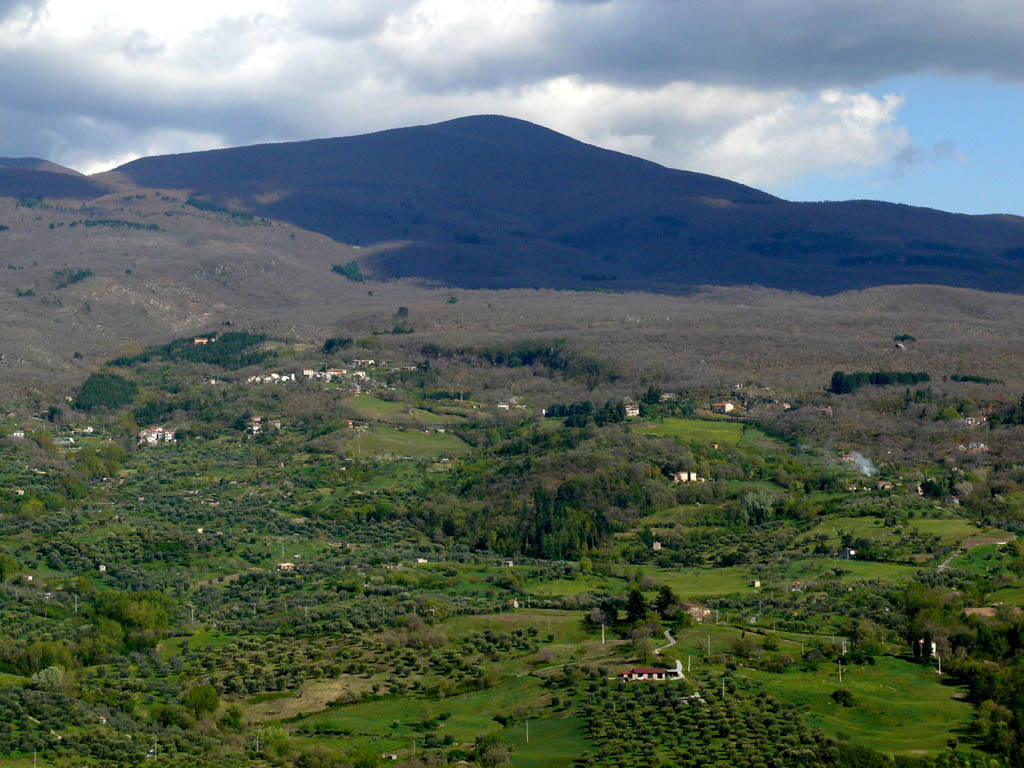
- View

Highest point
- Elevation: 1,738 m (5,702 ft)
- Prominence: 1,485 m (4,872 ft)
- Isolation: 113.09 km (70.27 mi)
- Listing: Ribu
- Coordinates: 42°54′N 11°38′E

Geography
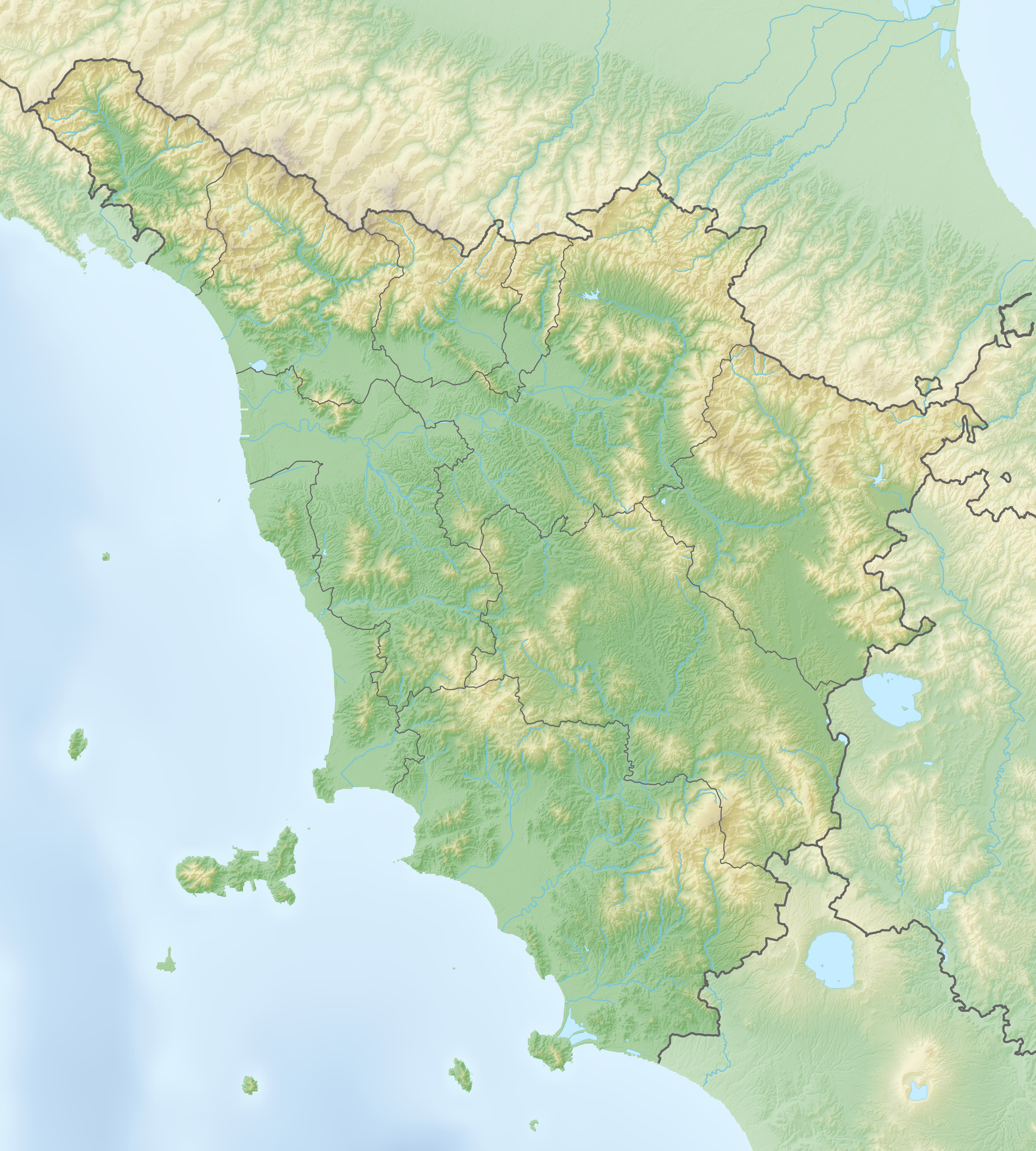
- Location within Tuscany Location within Italy
- Location: Tuscany, Italy
- Parent range: Tuscan Antiapennines

Geology
- Mountain type: Lava dome

Monte Amiata is the largest of the lava domes in the Amiata lava dome complex located about 20 km northwest of Lake Bolsena in the southern Tuscany region of Italy. It lies within the provinces of Grosseto and Siena.

== Geology ==
Monte Amiata is a compound lava dome with a trachytic lava flow that extends to the east. It is part of the larger Amiata complex volcano. A massive viscous trachydacitic lava flow, 5 km long and 4 km wide, is part of the basal complex and extends from beneath the southern base of the Corno de Bellaria dome. Radiometric dates indicate that the Amiata complex had a major eruptive episode about 300,000 years ago. No eruptive activity has occurred at Amiata during the Holocene, but thermal activity including cinnabar mineralization continues at a geothermal field near the town of Bagnore, at the SW end of the dome complex.

== Economy ==
The main economical resources of the Amiata region are chestnuts, timber and, increasingly, tourism (ski resorts include the peak area, Prato delle Macinaie, Prato della Contessa, Rifugio Cantore and Pian della Marsiliana). The lower areas are characterized by olive trees and vines. Other vegetation include beech and fir. From the 1870s until around 1980 cinnabar was extracted here.

The region is included in the comuni of Abbadia San Salvatore, Arcidosso, Castel del Piano, Piancastagnaio, Santa Fiora and Seggiano, all located between 600 and 800 metres of altitude.

== See also ==
- List of volcanoes in Italy
