= Museo d'Arte Sacra della Val d'Arbia =

Art museum in Buonconvento, Tuscany, Italy

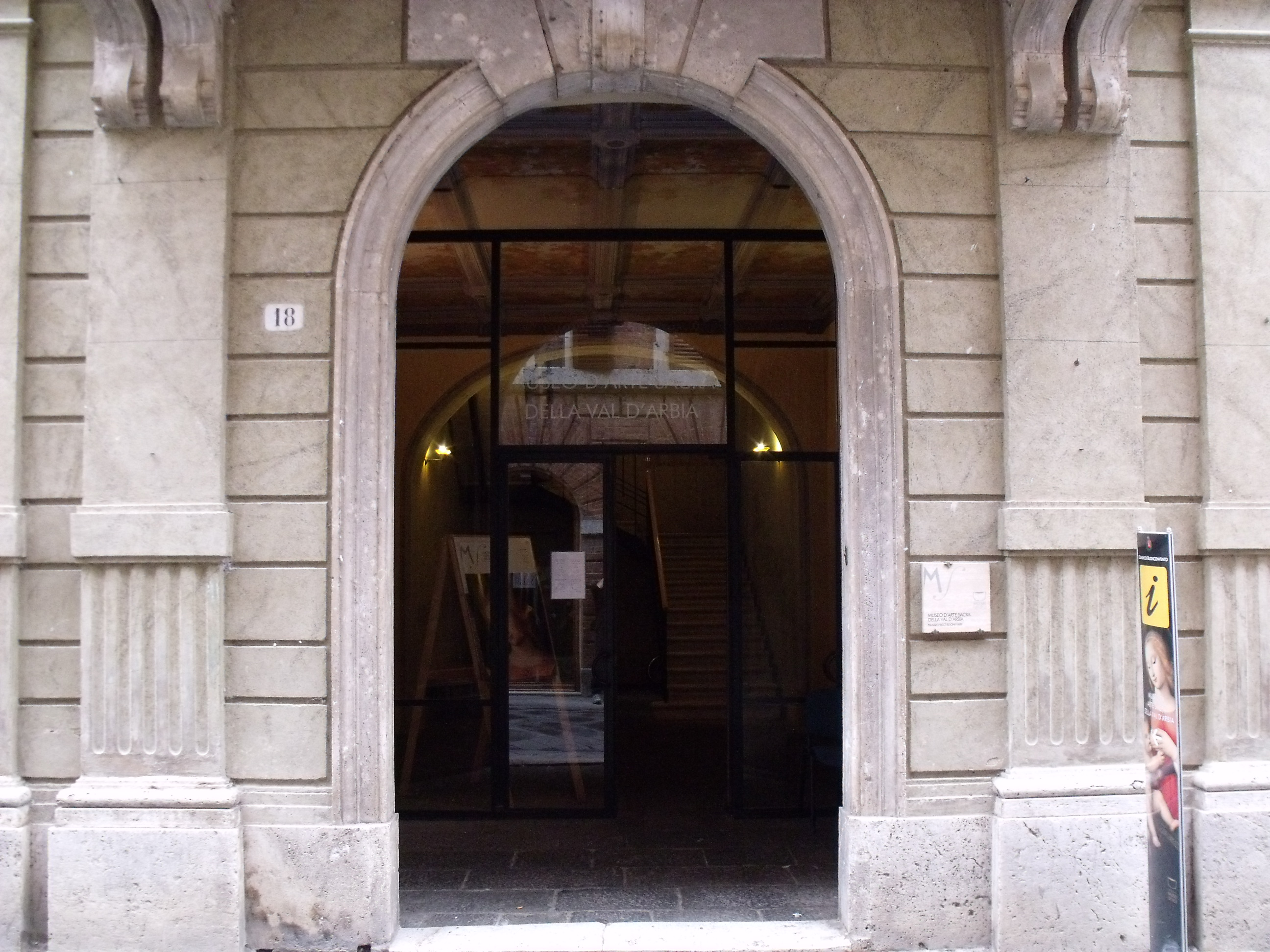
- Entrance to the museum
- Established: 1926
- Location: Palazzo Ricci Socini; Buonconvento; Tuscany, Italy
- Coordinates: 43.1387°N 11.4819°E
- Type: art museum
- Founder: Crescenzio Massari

The Museo d'Arte Sacra della Val d'Arbia is a small museum of religious art in Buonconvento, in the Val d'Arbia to the south of Siena, in Tuscany in central Italy. It contain a number of paintings by important artists of the Sienese School, among them Duccio di Buoninsegna, Sano di Pietro and Pietro Lorenzetti. The museum is housed in the Palazzo Ricci Socini, close to the parish church of Santi Pietro e Paolo.

== History ==
The museum was started by the parish priest, Crescenzio Massari, in 1926, and has since expanded. A number of works were originally in various churches in the area.

== Collection ==
The museum holds paintings by several important artists of the Sienese School. Among them are:

- a tetraptych of the Annunciation, painted in 1397 by Andrea di Bartolo
- a Madonna and Child (the "Madonna di Buonconvento") by Duccio di Buoninsegna
- the Madonna del Latte of Luca di Tommè
- a Madonna and Child with Two Angels by Matteo di Giovanni, painted between 1470 and 1475, formerly in the Pieve di Percenna of Buonconvento
- by Sano di Pietro: a Coronation of the Virgin from the church of Sant'Albano in Quinciano; a Madonna and Child Enthroned between Saints Bernardino and Catherine formerly in the nearby church of Santi Pietro e Paolo; and a Madonna and Child with Saints Apollonia and Bernardino with Angels from the church of Sant'Andrea a Frontignano.

Among the other Sienese artists represented are Andrea Piccinelli ("Il Brescianino"), Bartolomeo di David, Bernardino Mei, Francesco Vanni, Pietro Lorenzetti, Rutilio Manetti and Ventura Salimbeni.

The Florentine School is represented by one painting, an Annunciation by Benvenuto di Giovanni dating from between 1490 and 1500.

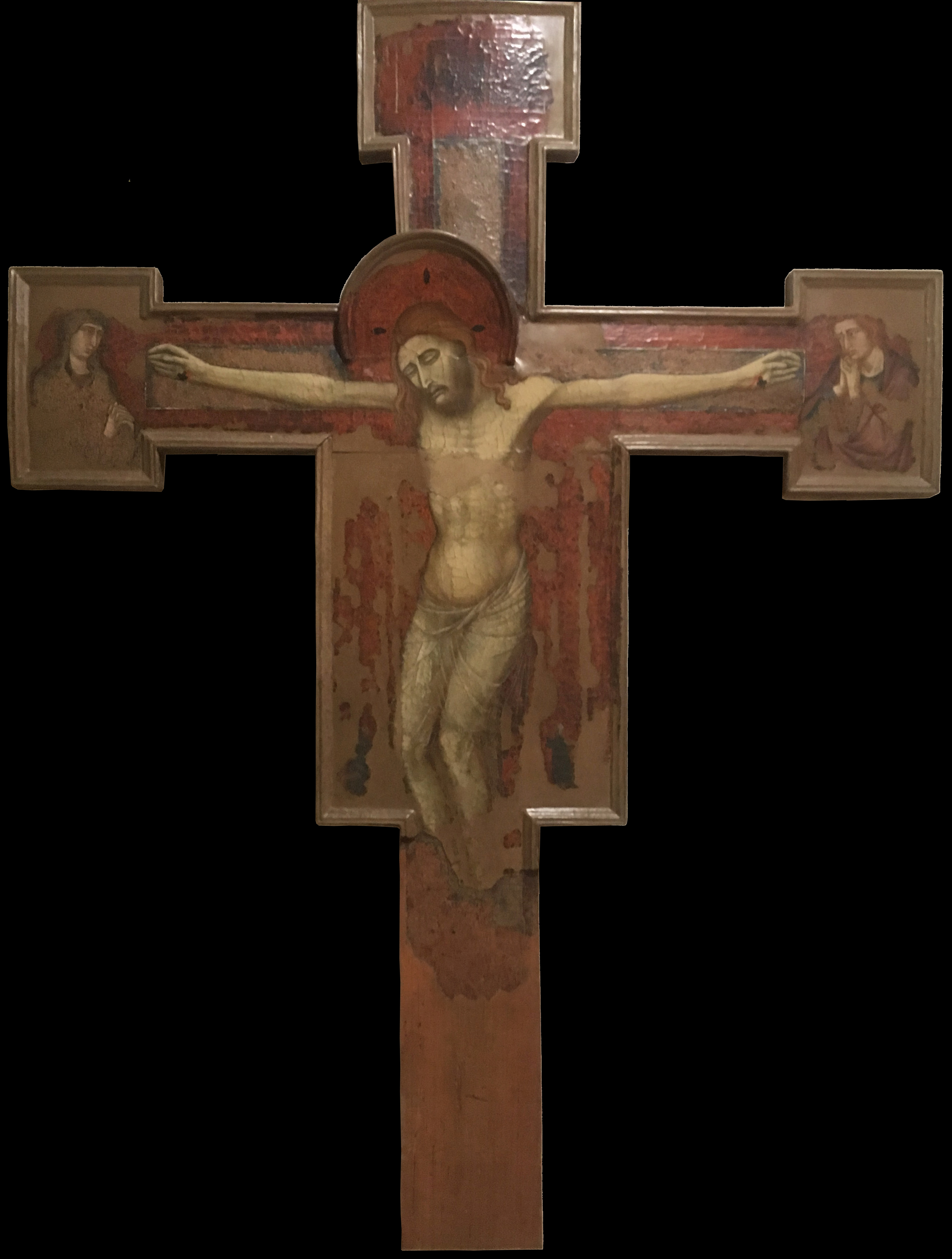
Maestro della Croce di Buonconvento, Crucifix

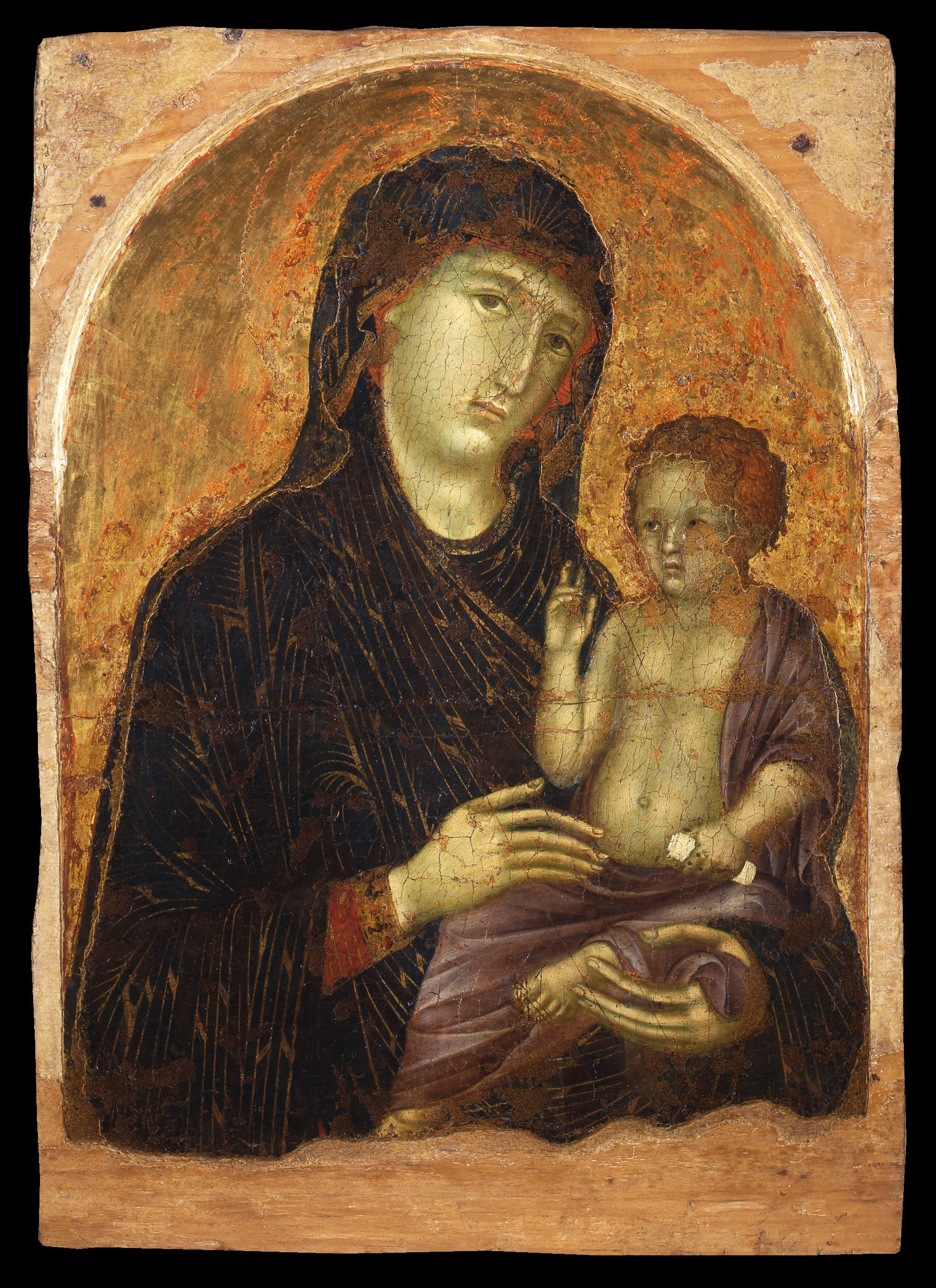
Duccio di Buoninsegna, the Madonna di Buonconvento

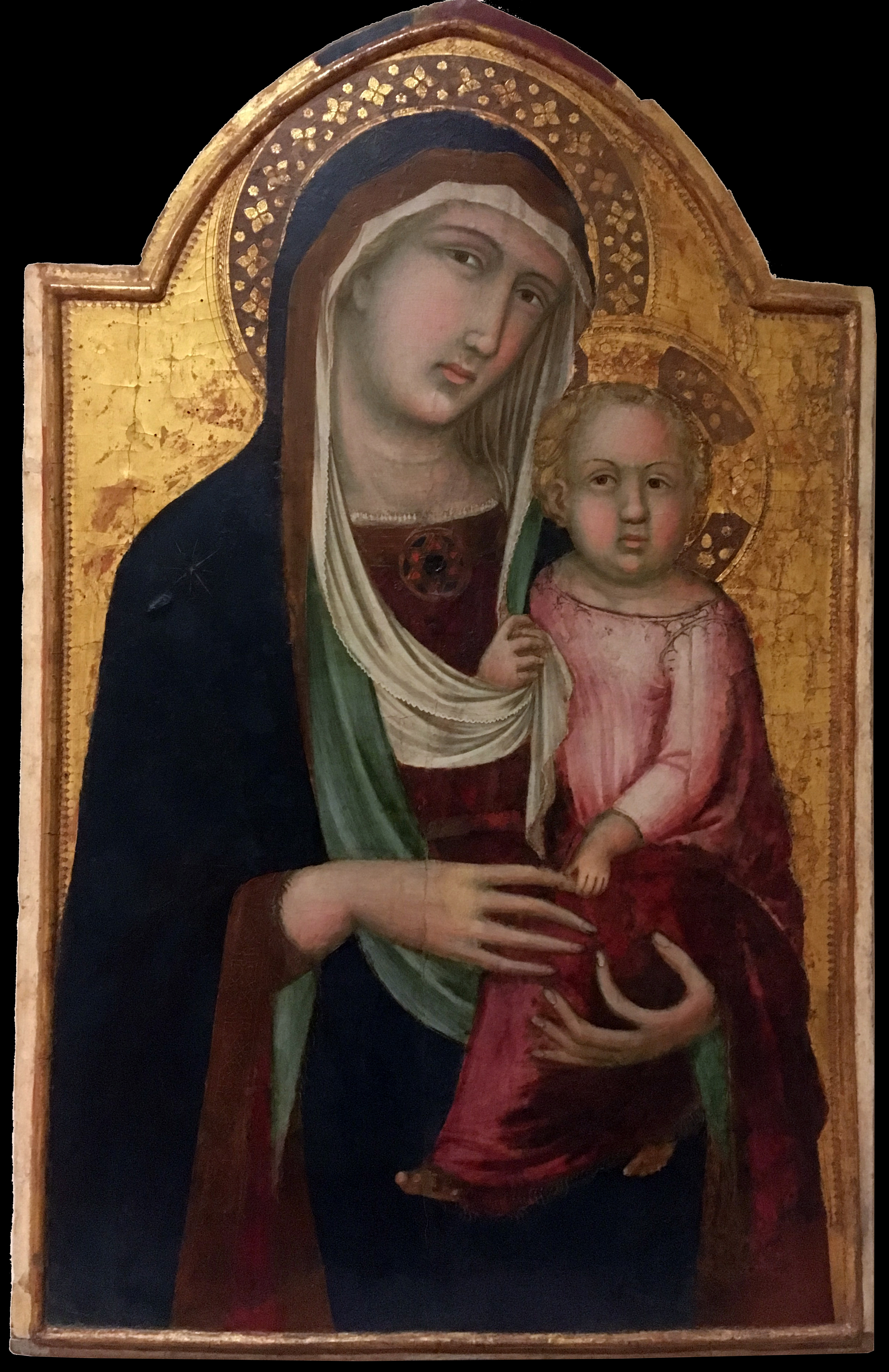
Pietro Lorenzetti, Madonna with Child

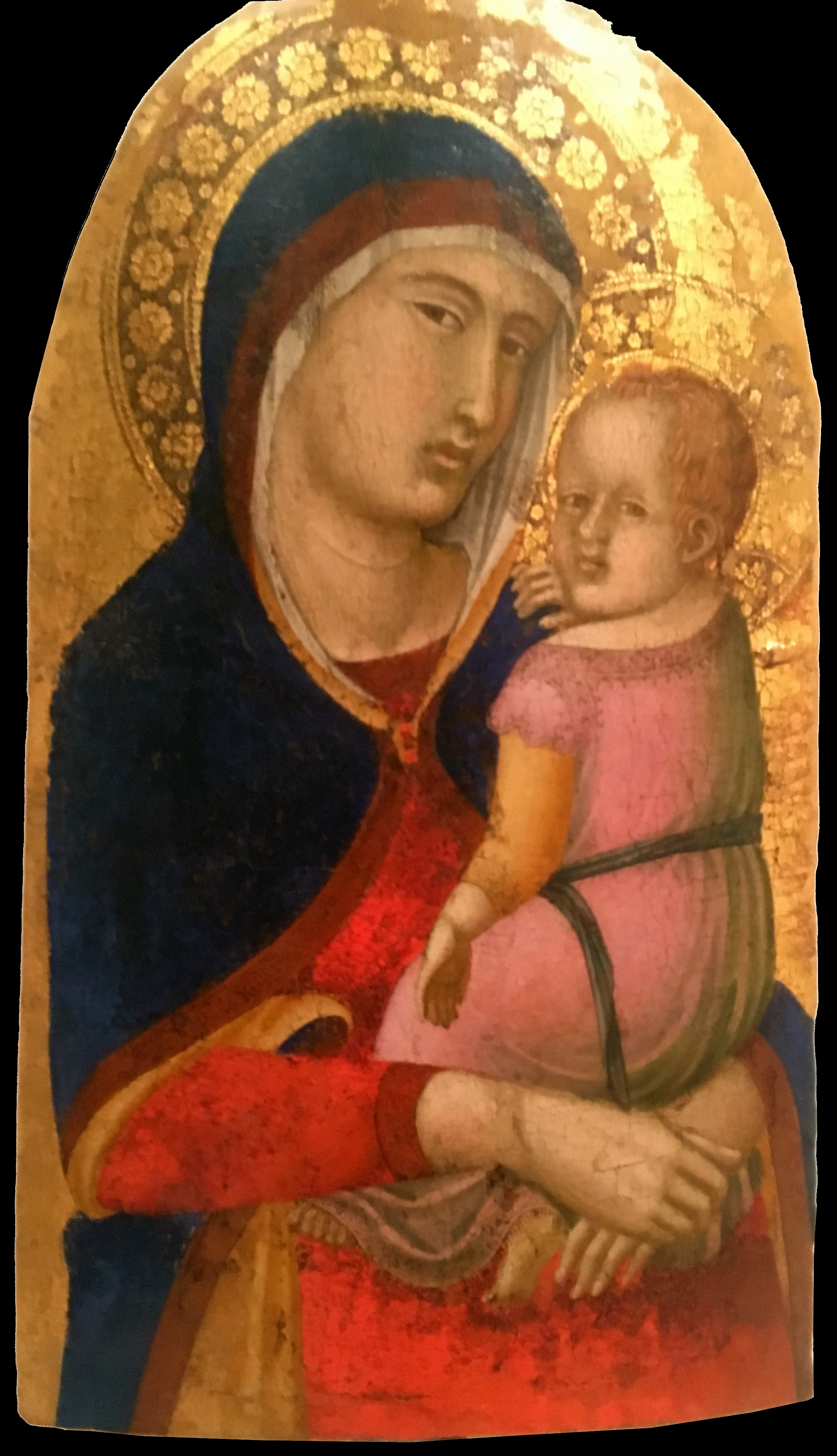
Pietro Lorenzetti, Madonna with Child

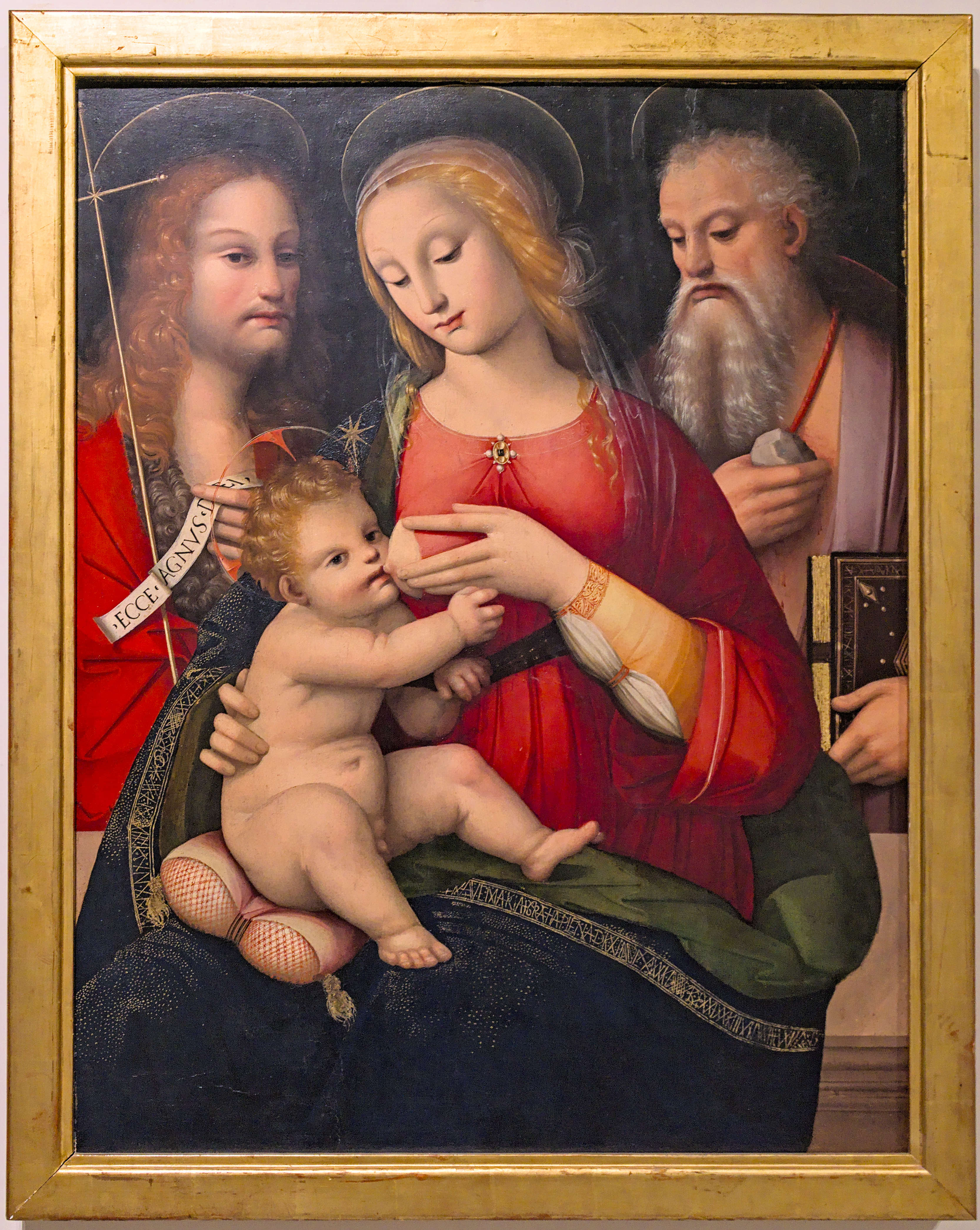
Andrea del Brescianino, Madonna che allatta il Bambino e i Santi Giovanni Battista e Girolamo
