= Tressa (river) =

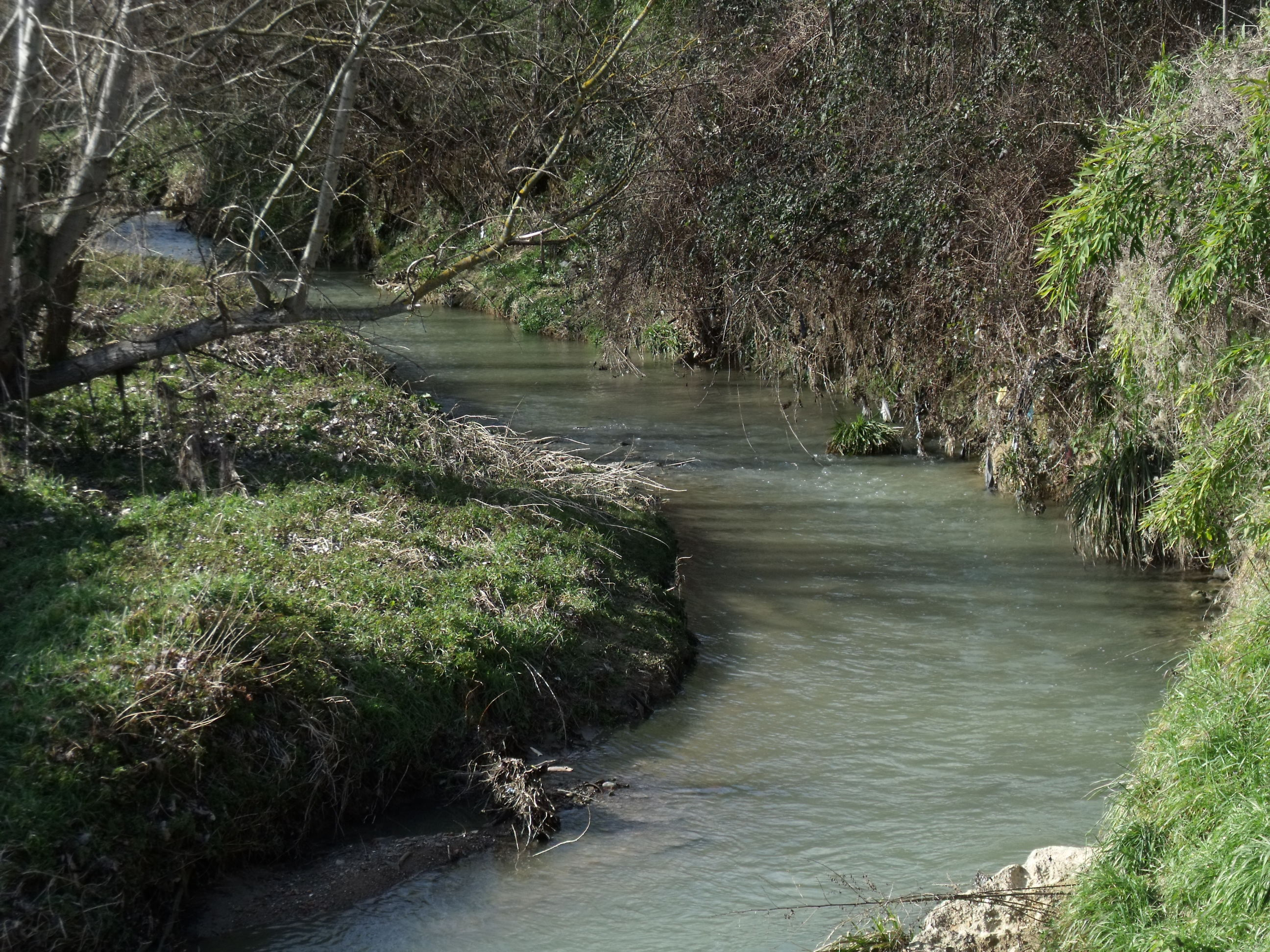

Location
- Country: Italy

Physical characteristics
- Mouth: Arbia
  - coordinates: 43°15′17″N 11°23′52″E

Basin features
- Progression: Ombrone→ Tyrrhenian Sea

The Tressa is a torrent in Tuscany, central Italy, a tributary of the river Arbia. It's 17 kilometers long and its source is located in the comune of Siena on southern side of San Dalmazio hill (but the San Dalmazio church is in Monteriggioni municipality). It flows across the territory of Monteroni d'Arbia and then into the river Arbia near Ponte a Tressa.
