= Arbia (river) =

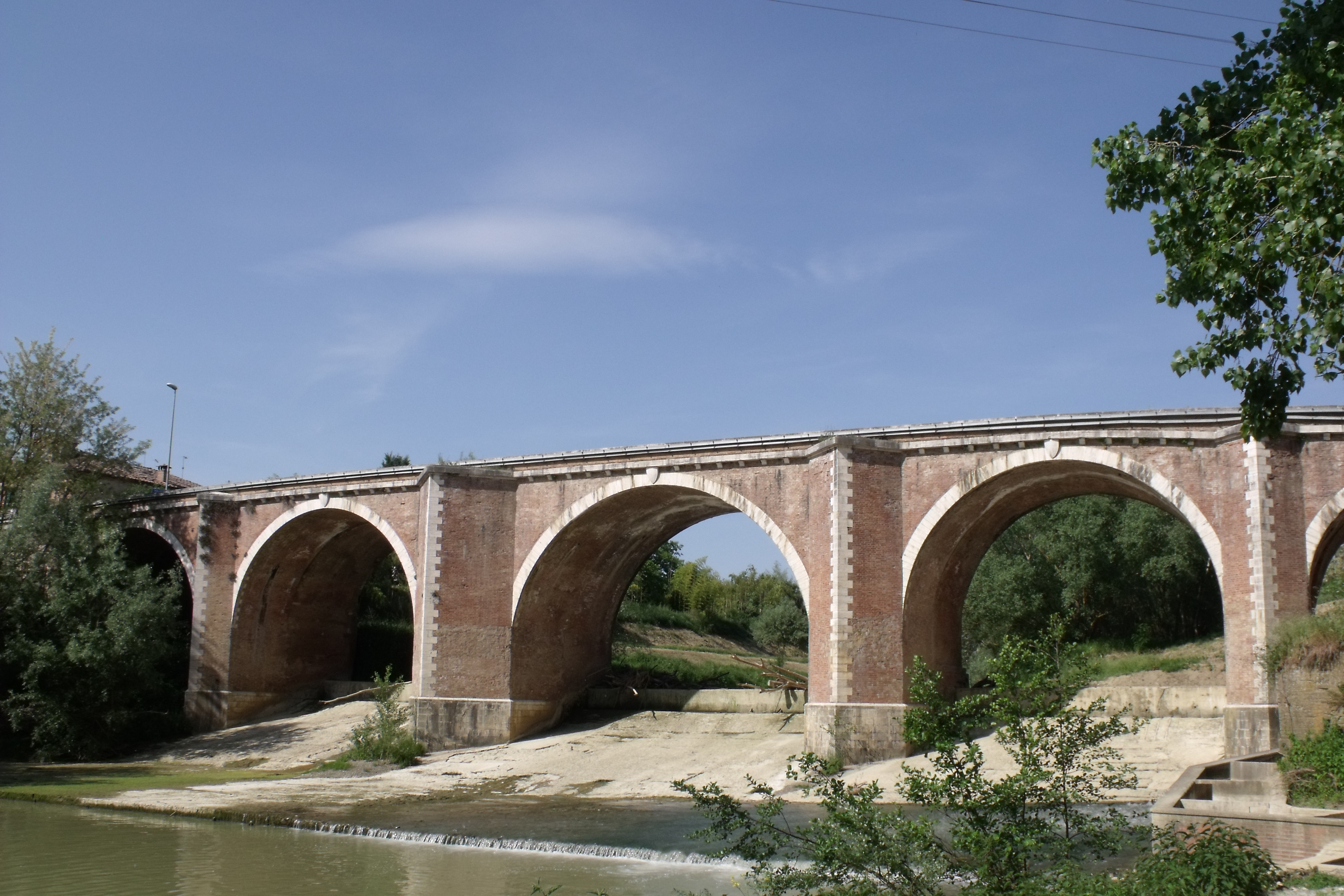

Location
- Country: Italy

Physical characteristics
- Mouth: Ombrone
  - coordinates: 43°08′17″N 11°28′30″E

Basin features
- Progression: Ombrone→ Tyrrhenian Sea

The Arbia is a torrent in Tuscany, central Italy, a tributary of the river Ombrone. Its source is located in the comune of Castellina in Chianti, at 620 m above sea level. It flows into the Ombrone near Buonconvento.

The river is mentioned by Dante in his Divine Comedy, its waters becoming "stained red" (Inferno, Canto X, verse 86) in the wake of the Battle of Montaperti between Florence and Siena. Localities taking their names from Arbia include the comune of Monteroni d'Arbia and the frazioni of Arbia, Isola d'Arbia, Lucignano d'Arbia, Ponte d'Arbia, Taverne d'Arbia and Vico d'Arbia.
