= Tressa =

Tressa may refer to:

- Tressa (river), a torrent in Tuscany, central Italy
- Tressa, a feminine given name
- Ponte a Tressa, a village in Tuscany, central Italy, administratively a frazione of the comune of Monteroni d'Arbia, province of Siena
