= Clio, Muse of History (Pisa) =

Painting by Artemisia Gentileschi

- Clio
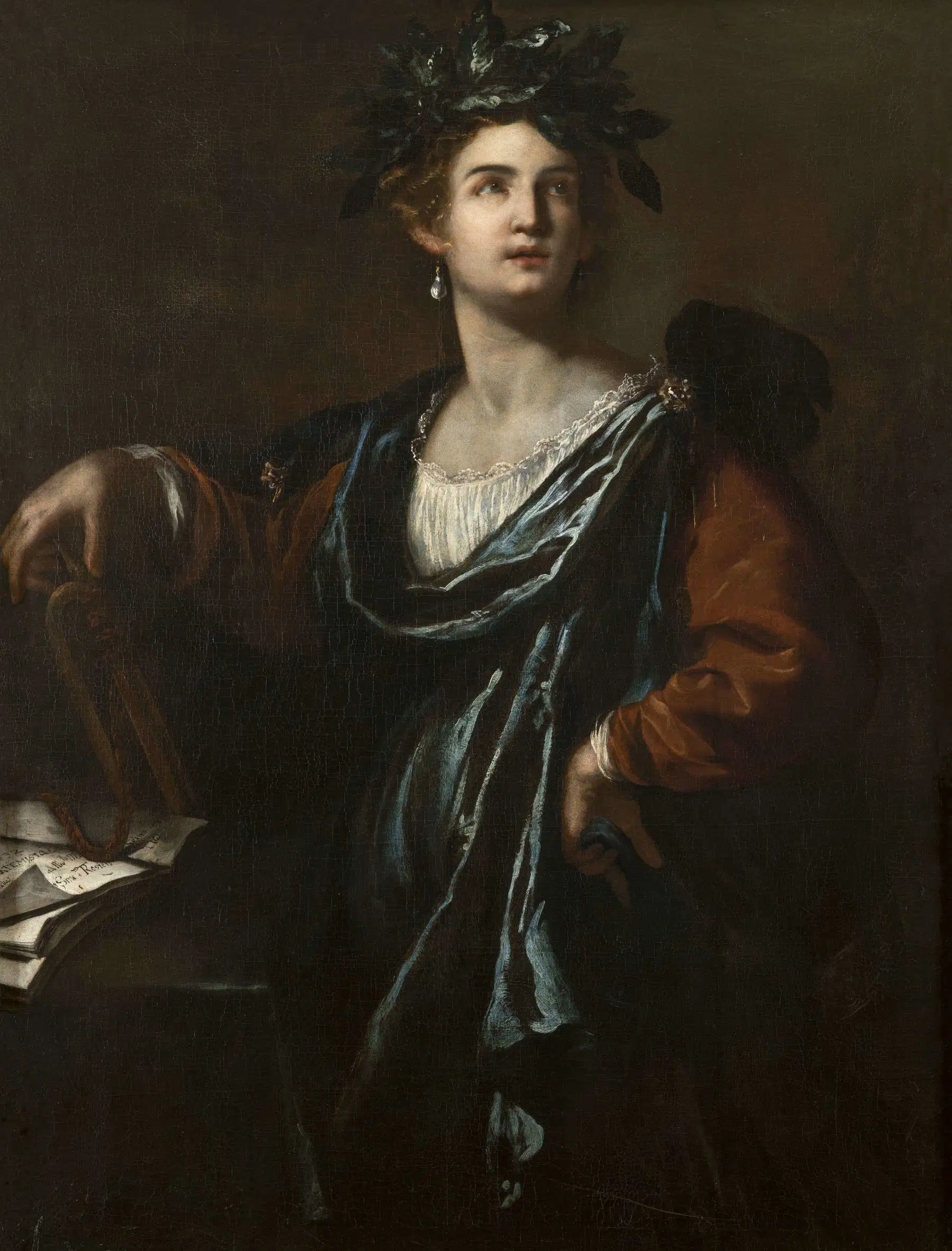
- Artist: Artemisia Gentileschi
- Year: 1632
- Medium: oil paint, canvas
- Dimensions: 127.6 cm (50.2 in) × 97.5 cm (38.4 in)
- Location: Palazzo Giuli Rosselmini Gualandi

Clio, Muse of History is a painting by the baroque painter Artemisia Gentileschi. It was painted around 1632, just after Artemisia had moved to Naples. It currently hangs in the Palazzo Blu, Pisa. The painting has been interpreted in relationship to Gentileschi's own career and self-image - "by including her signature in Clio's open book, Artemisia was quite literally writing herself into history". In stylistic terms, the painting demonstrates Gentileschi's borrowing from Venetian styles of painting where she "applied her colors in a free and more spontaneous fashion."

== Description ==
A woman is shown in three-quarter view, turned to her right looking over her left shoulder, eyes cast upwards. Her left hand rests on her hip, with her right hand resting on a trumpet perched on an open book. She wears a crown of leaves as well as a large pearl earring in her right ear. She wears a russet-coloured gown over a white chemise, covered with a blue mantle pinned with a brooch at the left shoulder. The space in which she stands is dark, with a light source from the left casting highlights on her face, chemise and the pages of the book.

The figure depicted is Clio, the Muse of History. Cesere Ripa's Iconologia, an important source book for artists of the time, stated that Clio should be depicted with a crown of laurels, a trumpet and an open book. Traces of earlier painting underneath the surface suggest, but cannot definitively prove, that the earlier subject was that of Fame, another figure from Ripa's Iconologia. It was not uncommon for Gentileschi to reuse or alter course during the painting of a canvas.

== History ==
On the book on the left of the painting the date 1632 is inscribed, along with Artemisia's name (which is written in upper case) The name of "F. Rosier" is also recorded in the inscription. This is likely to be François de Rosières, a French nobleman and academic who had been in the service of the Duke of Guise, who, after a rift with Cardinal Richelieu, had fled his home country and was living in Italy at the time. In a 1635 letter to Galileo Galilei, the artist mentions receiving payment for a work delivered to the Duke.

== Provenance ==
The work was most likely painted for Charles, Duke of Guise. Nothing is known of its whereabouts until it appeared at a London gallery in 1940. It moved through several collections in Great Britain and New York before its sale in December 2004 to the present owners.

== See also ==
- List of works by Artemisia Gentileschi
