= Cesare Maccari =

Italian painter and sculptor

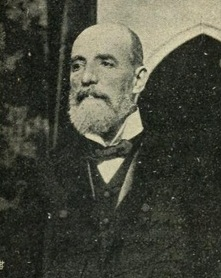
- Born: 9 May 1840; Siena, Grand Duchy of Tuscany
- Died: 7 August 1919 (aged 79); Rome, Italy
- Known for: painting
- Notable work: Cicero Denounces Catiline
- Movement: Romantic historicism

Cesare Maccari (Italian pronunciation: [ˈtʃeːzare makˈkaːri, ˈtʃɛː-]; 9 May 1840 – 7 August 1919) was an Italian painter and sculptor, most famous for his 1888 painting Cicerone denuncia Catilina (usually translated as Cicero Accuses Catiline or Cicero Denounces Catiline).

== Early life ==
Maccari was born in Siena, in the Grand Duchy of Tuscany. He was a student of the Institute of the Fine Arts in Siena together with Tito Sarrocchi, working in sculpture and helping complete the Monumento Pianigiani in Siena. He later worked in the atelier of Luigi Mussini in Florence. There, in 1864, he was commissioned by an English society to copy works of Bernardino Pinturicchio found in the Cathedral of Siena.

Some of his first patronage came from works for the Marquis Pieri-Nerli, who also commissioned him to paint frescoes of the four evangelists for a private chapel in his home in Quinciano, a hamlet in the comune of Monteroni d'Arbia. Maccari soon won a stipend to study in Rome, which also allowed him to travel through Italy.

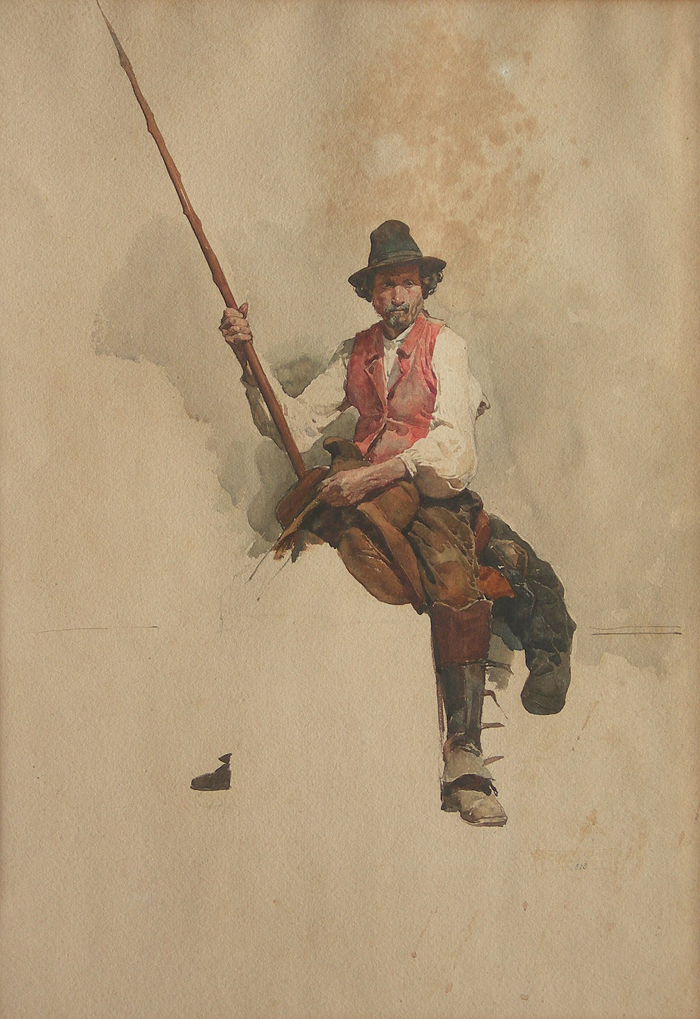
Watercolor by Cesare Maccari

== Mature work in Rome ==
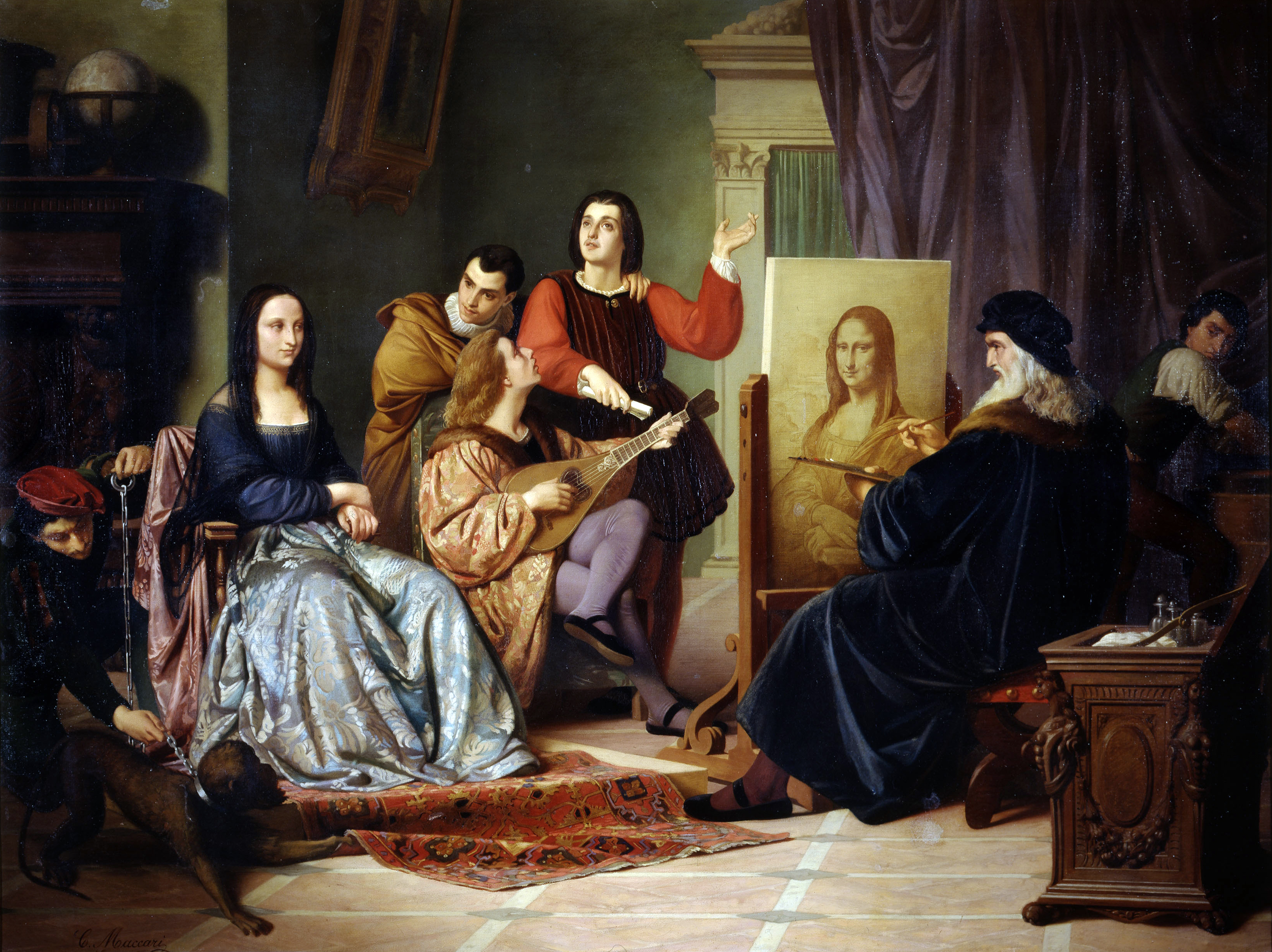
Leonardo da Vinci Painting the Mona Lisa

Among his first major oil canvases in Rome, Maccari painted Vittoria Colonna meditates on the Poetry of Michelangelo. Another canvas, Sira che sacrifica la propia vita per la padrona Fabiola won a medal at the Exhibition of Termini (Rome). Next, his canvas Un palpito del passato was awarded a gold medal at the Exposition of Parma. He painted two figures in the church of Santa Francesca Romana. He was commissioned a Deposition by the marchesa di Cassibile.

From 1870 to 1873, he was active as a fresco artist decorating the interior of the church of the Sudario in Rome. He also painted the lunette above the tomb of the Lombardi in Campo Verano. He painted in tempera: Love crowning the three Graces At the 1878 Turin Exposition, he sent an oil canvas depicting The Deposition of Pope Silverius by Antonina, wife of Belisarius. The prize-winning painting was purchased for the Civic Museum of Turin.

In 1863, Maccari painted Leonardo che ritrae la Gioconda (commonly translated Leonardo [da Vinci] painting the Mona Lisa), which won an award in 1865. In his hometown, Siena, he decorated the Sala del Risorgimento in the public palace with frescoes that were well received by critics.

Between 1882 and 1888 Maccari painted a series of frescoes depicting famous events in the history of the Senate of Ancient Roman at the "Sala Maccari" in the Salone d'Onore (Reception Hall) of Rome's Palazzo Madama, seat of the Italian Senate, amongst them his most famous work, Cicero Denounces Catiline (more on this canvas below). Other walls include these depictions:

- Appius Claudius Caecus led into the Senate, where he will give a speech to convince the Romans to reject the humiliating peace conditions imposed by Pyrrhus of Epirus's ambassador, Cineas.

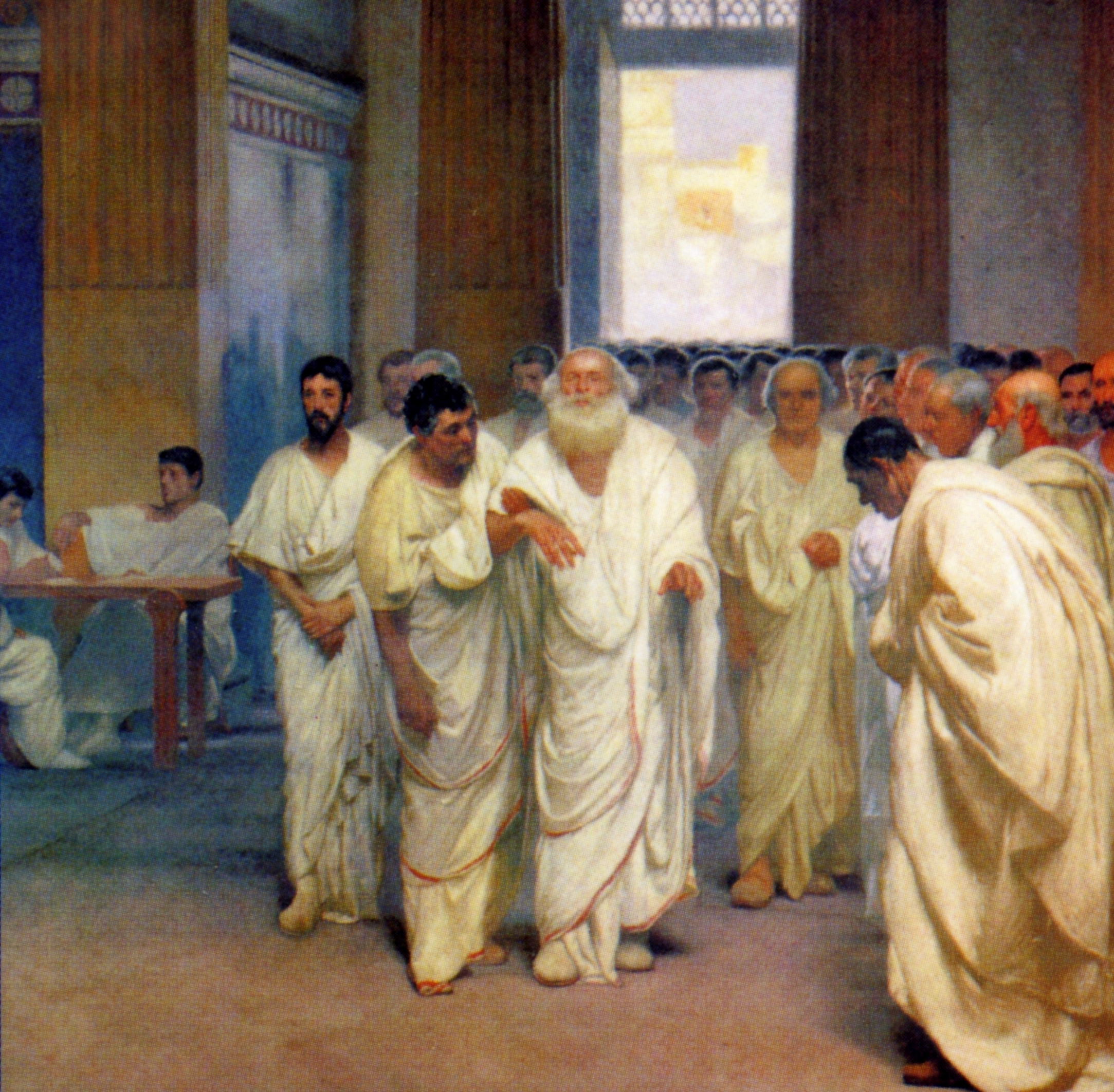
Appius Claudius Caecus is led into the Curia Hostilia by his sons. 19th-century painting by Cesare Maccari.

- The elder senator, Marcus Papirius, bravely seated motionless, confronts the Gauls occupying Rome after the Battle of the Allia.
- Samnites trying to bribe Curius Dentatus to convince the Senate to make peace.
- Marcus Atilius Regulus, who had been sent back to Rome after being captured by Carthage during the First Punic War, urges the Senate to reject the Carthaginian peace offer he was sent to deliver and even vows to return to Carthage as a prisoner, where he knows that he will be executed.

Maccari designed and completed the frescoes for the cupola of the Basilica di Loreto, completed in 1890 to 1907, and which replaced the frescoes of Cristoforo Roncalli, from the second decade of the 17th century, which had badly deteriorated. The museum adjacent to the Basilica has the preparatory studies and paintings by Maccari. They depict events that led to the proclamation of the dogma of the Immaculate Conception in 1854.

In later life, Maccari became a lecturer at the Accademia di San Luca in Rome. He became paralyzed while he was working on the Palace of Justice in Rome in 1909, and as a result, he stopped working as an artist. Among his pupils were Cesare Bertolotti and Giuseppe Aureli. He died in Rome in 1919.

=== Cicerone denuncia Catilina ===
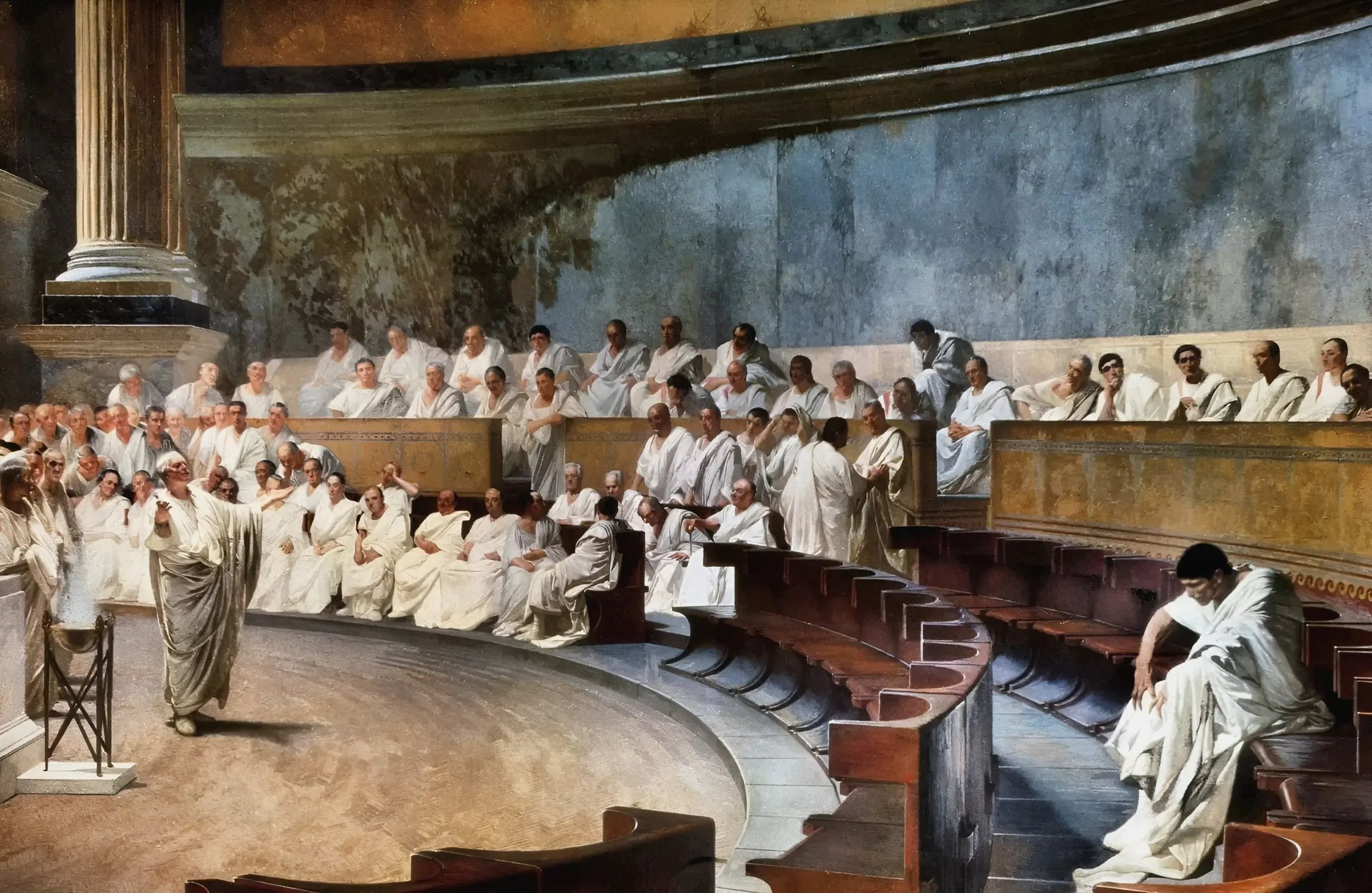
Cicero Denounces Catiline (1888)

Maccari's most famous work of art depicts Cicero's Oratio in Catilinam Prima in Senatu Habita, his first speech denouncing Catiline in the Roman Senate, which drove him from the city (63 BC). Maccari has been praised for the way his paintings captured the description of events and how Catiline was avoided by his fellow senators and sat alone while Cicero attacked him. On the other hand, his work has been criticized for some historical inaccuracy since he depicted the Senate meeting in the wrong place: the Senate actually met in the Temple of Jupiter Stator, not in the Senate House (Curia Cornelia). Cicero was 43 years old at the time but looks much older, and Catiline, who was two years older than Cicero, looks much younger than Cicero. The painting has been reproduced in many textbooks and histories of Rome, and its depiction of the Roman Senate has even influenced the presentation of the Senate of the Roman Republic in nonfiction books.

== See also ==
- List of Orientalist artists
- Orientalism

== Sources ==
- Guglielmo De Sanctis. Gli affreschi di C. Maccari nel Senato. Rome, 1889.
- G. Cantalamessa. Gli affreschi di C. Maccari nella cupola di Loreto. Rome, 1895.
