= 2025 Strade Bianche =

Bicycle race

2025 UCI World Tour, race 5 of 36

Race details
- Dates: 8 March 2025
- Stages: 1
- Distance: 213 km (132 mi)
- Winning time: 5h 13' 58"

Results
	Winner	Tadej Pogačar (SLO)	(UAE Team Emirates XRG)
	Second	Tom Pidcock (GBR)	(Q36.5 Pro Cycling Team)
	Third	Tim Wellens (BEL)	(UAE Team Emirates XRG)

The 2025 Strade Bianche was a road cycling one-day race that took place on 8 March 2025 in Tuscany, Italy. It was the 19th edition of the Strade Bianche and the fifth event of the 2025 UCI World Tour.

The race was won by Slovenian rider Tadej Pogačar of UAE Team Emirates XRG for the third time, despite crashing at high speed with around 50 kilometres (31 mi) of the race remaining. 2023 champion Tom Pidcock came home in second place.

== Route ==
The race started and finished in Siena, Italy. Taking place over 213 kilometres (132 mi), the course included 81.7 kilometres (50.8 mi) of 'strade bianche' gravel roads spread over thirteen sectors, with one new sector starting in Serravalle. Although taking place over a similar distance to previous editions of the race, the Serravalle sector added an additional 10 kilometres (6.2 mi) of 'strade bianche' gravel roads compared to the 2024 edition of the race. The race finished on the Piazza del Campo, after a steep climb up Via Santa Caterina with a maximum gradient of 16%.

== Teams ==
Twenty-five teams participated in the race, including all eighteen UCI WorldTeams and seven UCI ProTeams.

UCI WorldTeams

- Alpecin–Deceuninck
- Arkéa–B&B Hotels
- Cofidis
- Decathlon–AG2R La Mondiale
- EF Education–EasyPost
- Groupama–FDJ
- Ineos Grenadiers
- Intermarché–Wanty
- Lidl–Trek
- Movistar Team
- Red Bull–Bora–Hansgrohe
- Soudal–Quick-Step
- Team Bahrain Victorious
- Team Jayco–AlUla
- Team Picnic–PostNL
- UAE Team Emirates XRG
- Visma–Lease a Bike
- XDS Astana Team

UCI ProSeries Teams

- Israel–Premier Tech
- Lotto
- Q36.5 Pro Cycling Team
- Team Polti VisitMalta
- Team Solution Tech–Vini Fantini
- Tudor Pro Cycling Team
- Uno-X Mobility

== Result ==
Result
Rank	Rider	Team	Time
1	Tadej Pogačar (SLO)	UAE Team Emirates XRG	5h 13' 58"
2	Tom Pidcock (GBR)	Q36.5 Pro Cycling Team	+ 1' 24"
3	Tim Wellens (BEL)	UAE Team Emirates XRG	+ 2' 12"
4	Ben Healy (IRL)	EF Education–EasyPost	+ 3' 23"
5	Pello Bilbao (ESP)	Team Bahrain Victorious	+ 4' 20"
6	Magnus Cort (DEN)	Uno-X Mobility	+ 4' 26"
7	Gianni Vermeersch (BEL)	Alpecin–Deceuninck	+ 4' 29"
8	Michael Valgren (DEN)	EF Education–EasyPost	+ 4' 37"
9	Lennert Van Eetvelt (BEL)	Lotto	+ 4' 47"
10	Roger Adrià (ESP)	Red Bull–Bora–Hansgrohe	+ 5' 06"
