= Ville di Corsano =

- Frazione
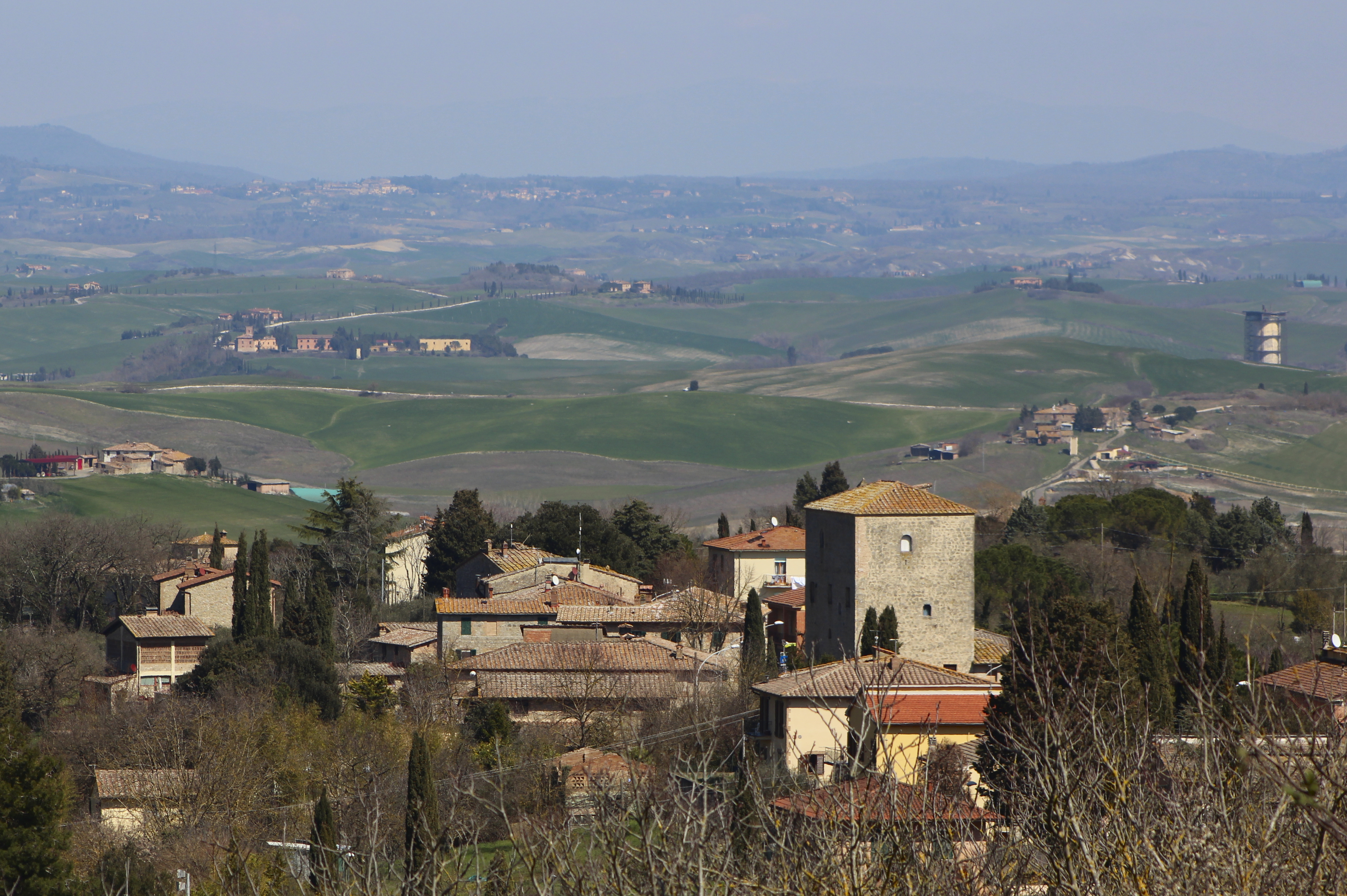
- View of Ville di Corsano

- Location of Ville di Corsano in Italy
- Coordinates: 43°13′22″N 11°19′59″E
- Country: Italy
- Region: Tuscany
- Province: Siena (SI)
- Comune: Monteroni d'Arbia
- Elevation: 279 m (915 ft)

Population (2011)
  - Total: 408
- Demonym: Corsanesi
- Time zone: UTC+1 (CET)
  - Summer (DST): UTC+2 (CEST)

Ville di Corsano is a village in Tuscany, central Italy, administratively a frazione of the comune of Monteroni d'Arbia, province of Siena. At the time of the 2001 census its population was 341.
