= Bibbiano, Buonconvento =

Bibbiano
- Frazione
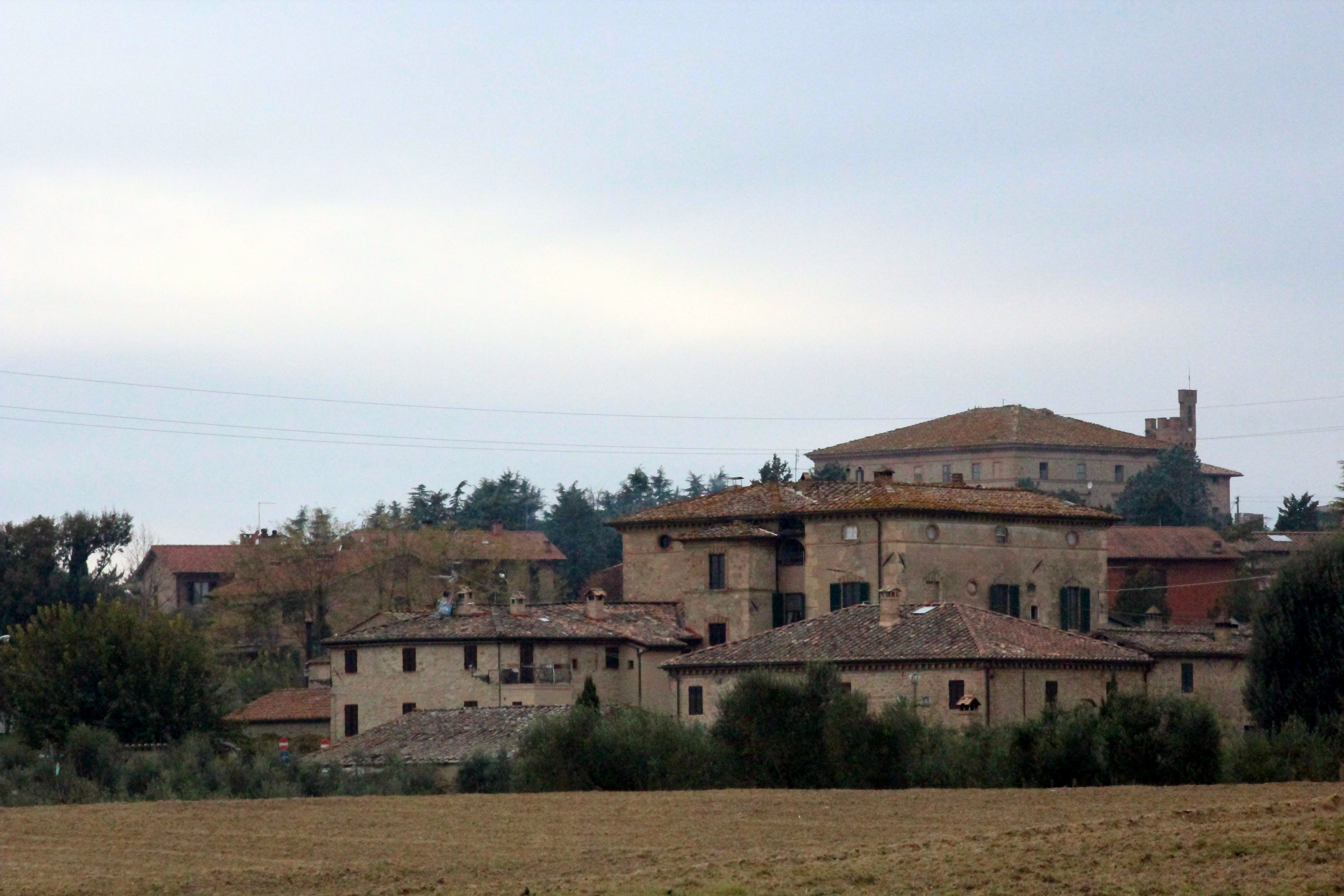
- View of Bibbiano

- Location of Bibbiano in Italy
- Coordinates: 43°7′32″N 11°26′53″E
- Country: Italy
- Region: Tuscany
- Province: Siena (SI)
- Comune: Buonconvento
- Elevation: 222 m (728 ft)

Population (2011)
  - Total: 88
- Demonym: Bibbianesi
- Time zone: UTC+1 (CET)
  - Summer (DST): UTC+2 (CEST)

Bibbiano is a village in Tuscany, central Italy, administratively a frazione of the comune of Buonconvento, province of Siena. At the time of the 2001 census its population was 81.

Bibbiano is about 30 km from Siena and 2 km from Buonconvento.
