= Radi, Monteroni d'Arbia =

Radi
- Frazione
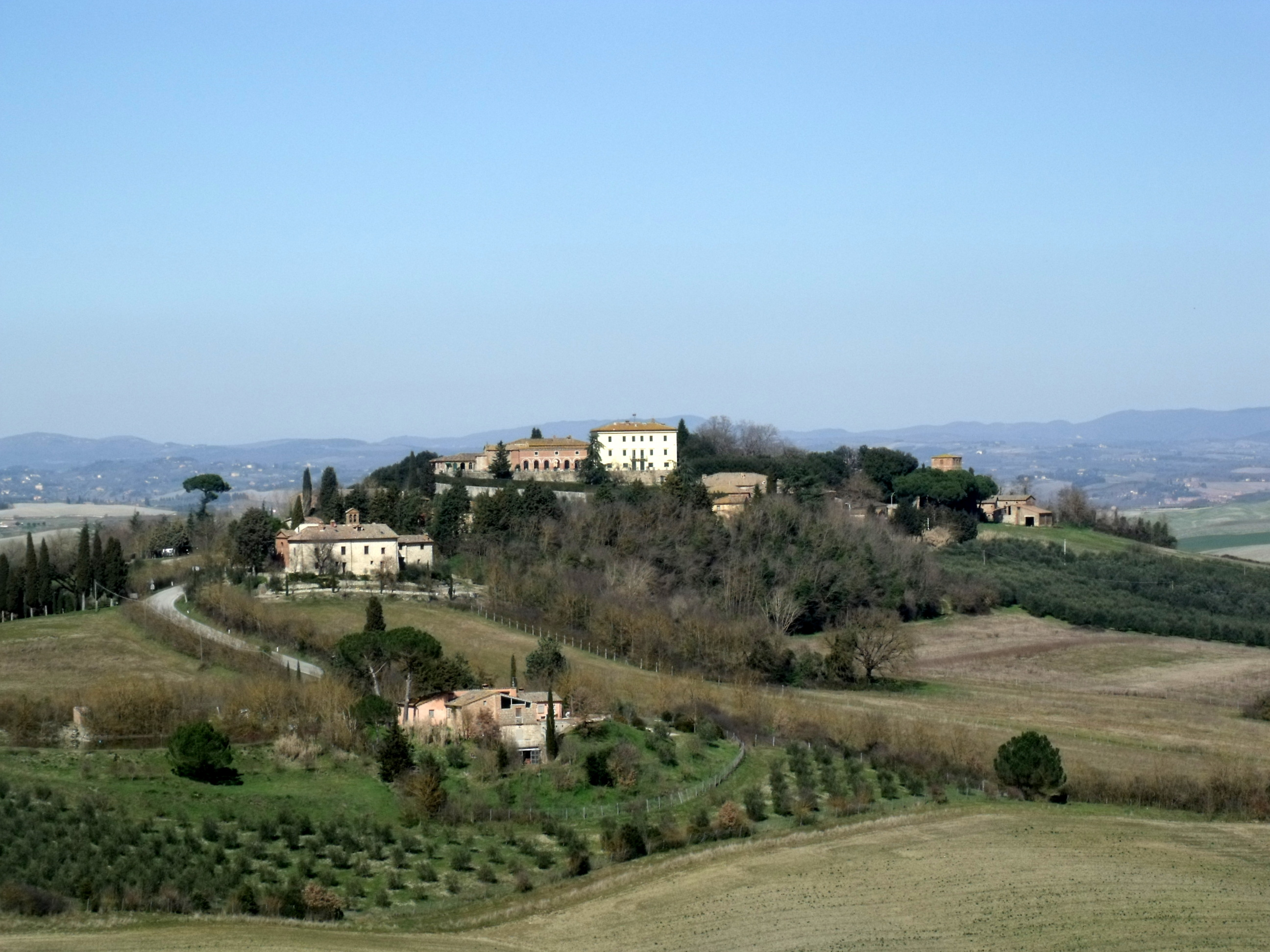
- View of Radi

- Location of Radi in Italy
- Coordinates: 43°13′3″N 11°22′18″E
- Country: Italy
- Region: Tuscany
- Province: Siena (SI)
- Comune: Monteroni d'Arbia
- Elevation: 264 m (866 ft)

Population (2011)
  - Total: 12
- Time zone: UTC+1 (CET)
  - Summer (DST): UTC+2 (CEST)

Radi is a village in Tuscany, central Italy, administratively a frazione of the comune of Monteroni d'Arbia, province of Siena. At the time of the 2001 census its population was 16.

== Bibliography ==
- Emanuele Repetti (1843). "Radi di Creta". Dizionario geografico fisico storico della Toscana. Vol. 4. Florence. pp. 708–709. Archived from the original on 2022-08-19.
