= Cesare Bertolotti =

Italian painter (1854–1932)

Cesare Bertolotti (September 19, 1854 – June 25, 1932) was an Italian painter, mainly of landscapes.

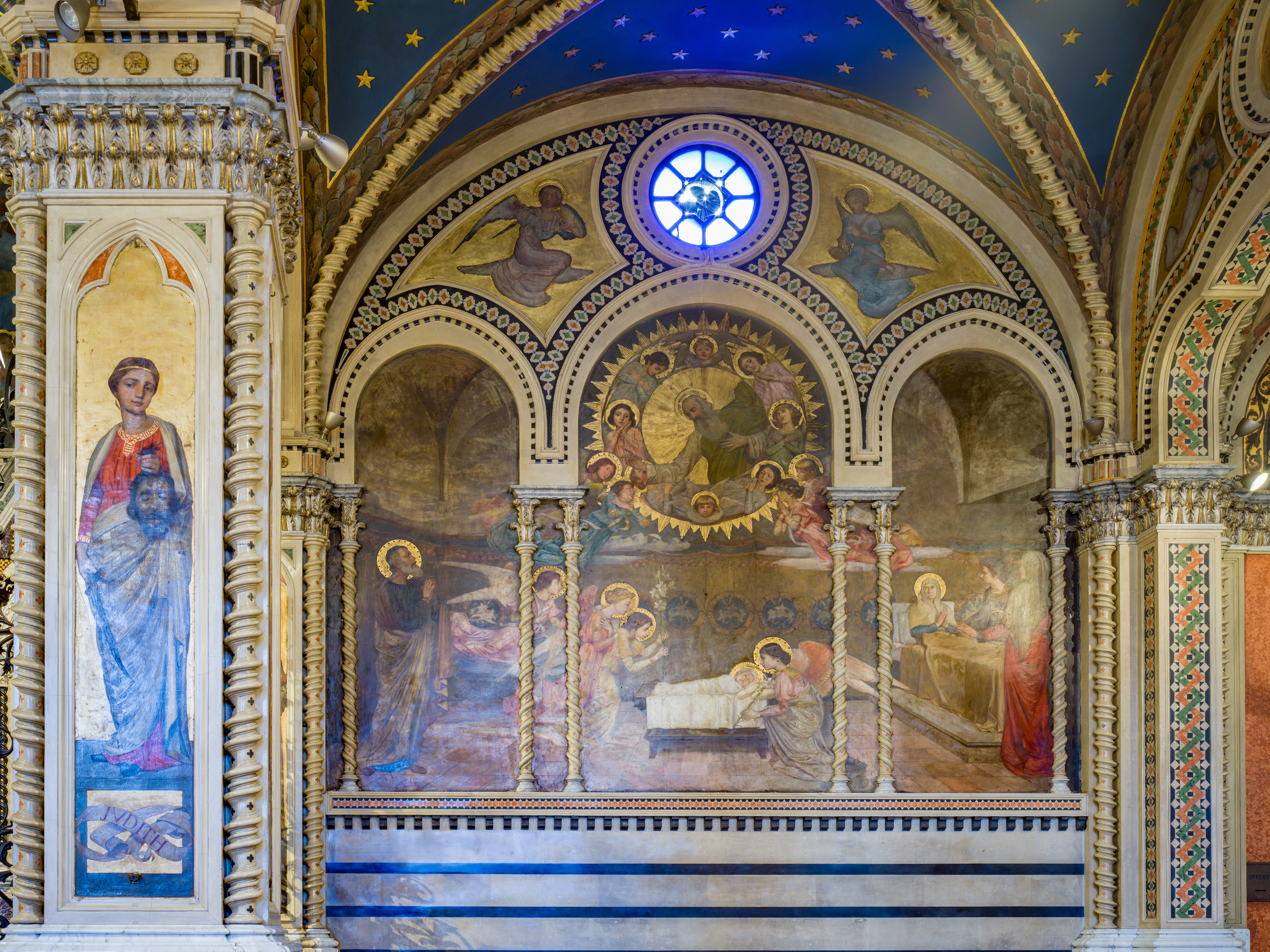
Nativity of Mary by Cesare Bertolotti in the Santuario di Santa Maria delle Grazie church in Brescia

He was born in Brescia, then part of the Austrian Empire, but passing to Italian control when he was about five. He began his studies in Brescia under R. Venturi and Achille Glisenti. He gained various stipends from the city from a legacy by Brozzoni, and went to Florence (1876–78), where he frequented the studio of Giuseppe Ciaranfi, In 1879, he moved to Milan, where he studied at the Brera with Bertini. In 1880–81, he traveled to Rome where he worked with Maccari, and finally in 1882, spent time with Franz Seraph Lenbach in Munich.

He then returned to Brescia, where he helped found a society of artists called Arte in Famiglia (dissolved in 1930). He displayed works at various exhibitions, including in Venice in 1887: Chiese a Gavardo; Cadeva il sole; Gavardo su quel di Brescia; Coglitore d' olive; and FIirtation. In 1911, he exhibited the painting Gli spasimi delle piante (The Throes of Plants) at the Permanente Exhibit of Milan. In 1915, he won the Prince Umberto with the painting Nella solenne tranquillità dei monti (In the solemn tranquility of mountains).

In 1889 he married Teresa Lancellotti, and his son Giuseppe, a captain of mountain artillery, was wounded on Monte Badenecche in November 1917 and died as a prisoner in Innsbruck in December. His letters from the front were published (1923, Florence) with a preface by Giannino Antona-Traversi.

Cesare Bertolotti died in Brescia on June 25, 1932.
