= Santi Pietro e Paolo, Buonconvento =

Church in Tuscany, Italy

Coordinates: 43°08′20.03″N 11°28′55.00″E

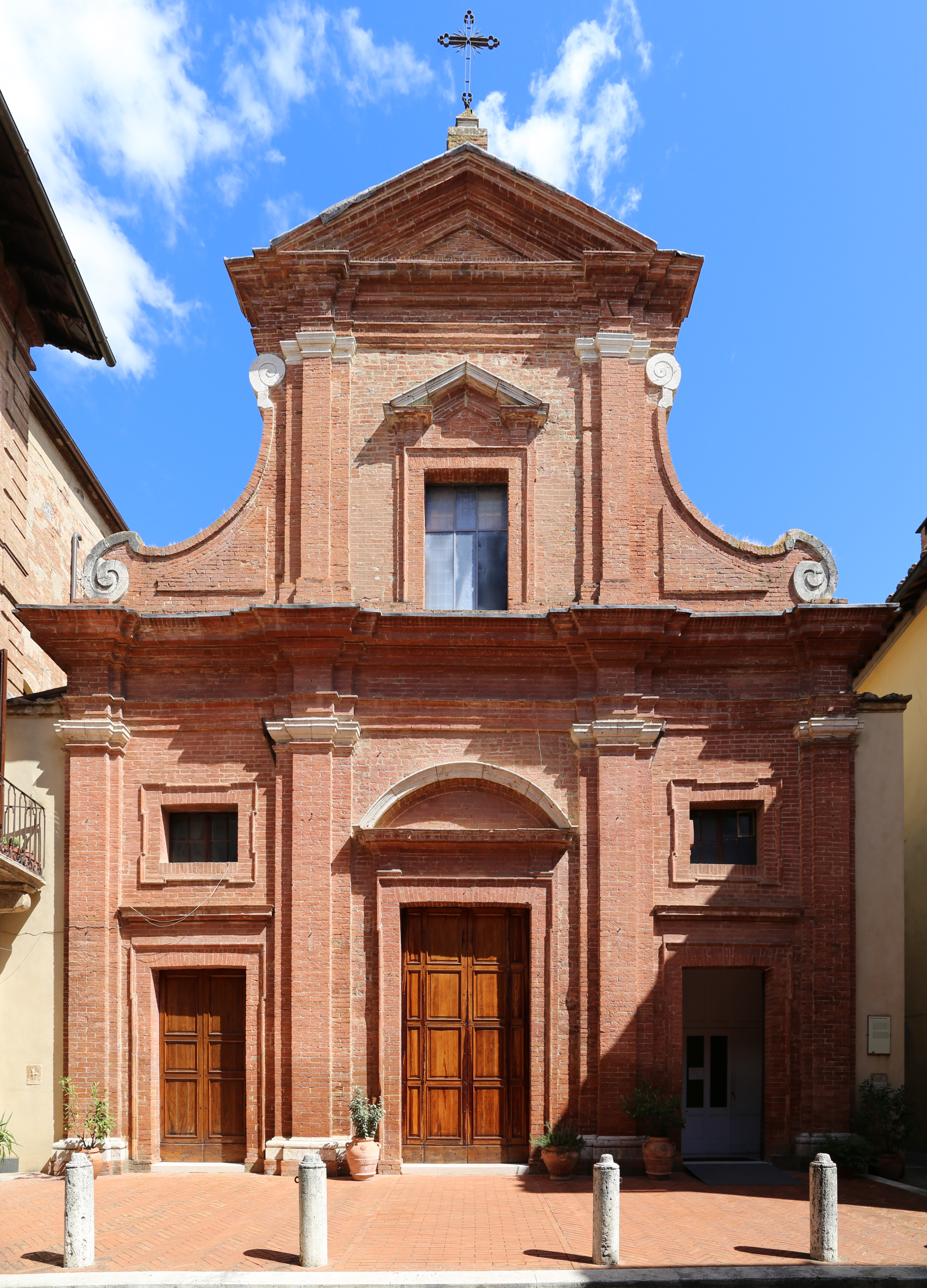
Church Santi Pietro e Paolo

Santi Pietro e Paolo is a Baroque-style, Roman Catholic parish church located in the center of the town of Buonconvento, region of Tuscany, Italy.

== History ==
A church at the site dates to 1103, but was refurbished in the 18th century, with the brick facade completed in 1723. The belltower dates to the early 19th century.

History recalls that in 24 August 1313, Henry VII of Luxembourg, Holy Roman Emperor died likely of malaria, at the age of 40 during the course of a siege of Siena. The church was severely damaged during an incursion of troops from Perugia in 1358.

The church was enriched by its position in the pilgrimage route to Rome. An inventory from 1895 listed the following works: a frescoed medieval icon of the Madonna, and a St Catherine of Alexandria by a painter of the Nasini family, a St Dominic by Stefano Volpi, an Immaculate Conception by Giacomo Pacchiarotti; and a Virgin of the Assumption by Arcangelo Salimbeni. The sacristy had paintings attributed to Lippo Memmi.

A Enthroned Madonna with child and Angels (circa 1450) by Matteo di Giovanni still remains in the church. A polyptych by Pietro di Francesco Orioli depicting an Enthroned Madonna and Saints is in the apse, along with two 17th-century canvases.

Many of the original works including paintings by Duccio di Buoninsegna, Sano di Pietro, and are now sheltered in the Museo d'Arte Sacra della Val d'Arbia.

The church also originally had paintings by Bartolo di Fredi depicting the Virgin and Angel of the Annunciation with Saints Mary Magdalen and St Anthony Abbot (1519), part of a polyptych.
