= Charles, Duke of Guise =

Duke of Guise

Charles
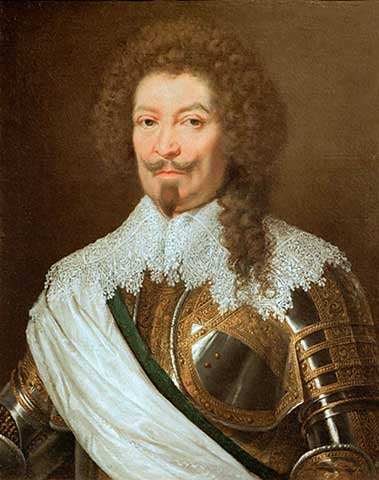
- Portrait of Charles, Duke of Guise, by Justus Sustermans

Duke of Guise
- Tenure: 23 December 1588 – 30 September 1640
- Predecessor: Henri I
- Successor: Henri II
- Born: August 20, 1571; Joinville
- Died: 30 September 1640 (aged 69); Cuna
- Spouse: Henriette Catherine of Joyeuse
- Issue: Henri II, Duke of Guise; Marie, Duchess of Guise; Louis, Duke of Joyeuse
- House: Guise
- Father: Henri I, Duke of Guise
- Mother: Catherine of Cleves

Charles de Lorraine, 4th Duke of Guise and 3rd Prince of Joinville (20 August 1571 – 30 September 1640), was the son of Henry I, Duke of Guise and Catherine of Cleves, and succeeded his father as Duke of Guise in 1588. Initially part of the Catholic league, he pledged his support for Henry IV of France and was made Admiral of the Levant by Louis XIII. After siding with the Queen Mother, Marie de' Medici, against Cardinal Richelieu, he fled to Italy with his family where he died in 1640.

== Biography ==
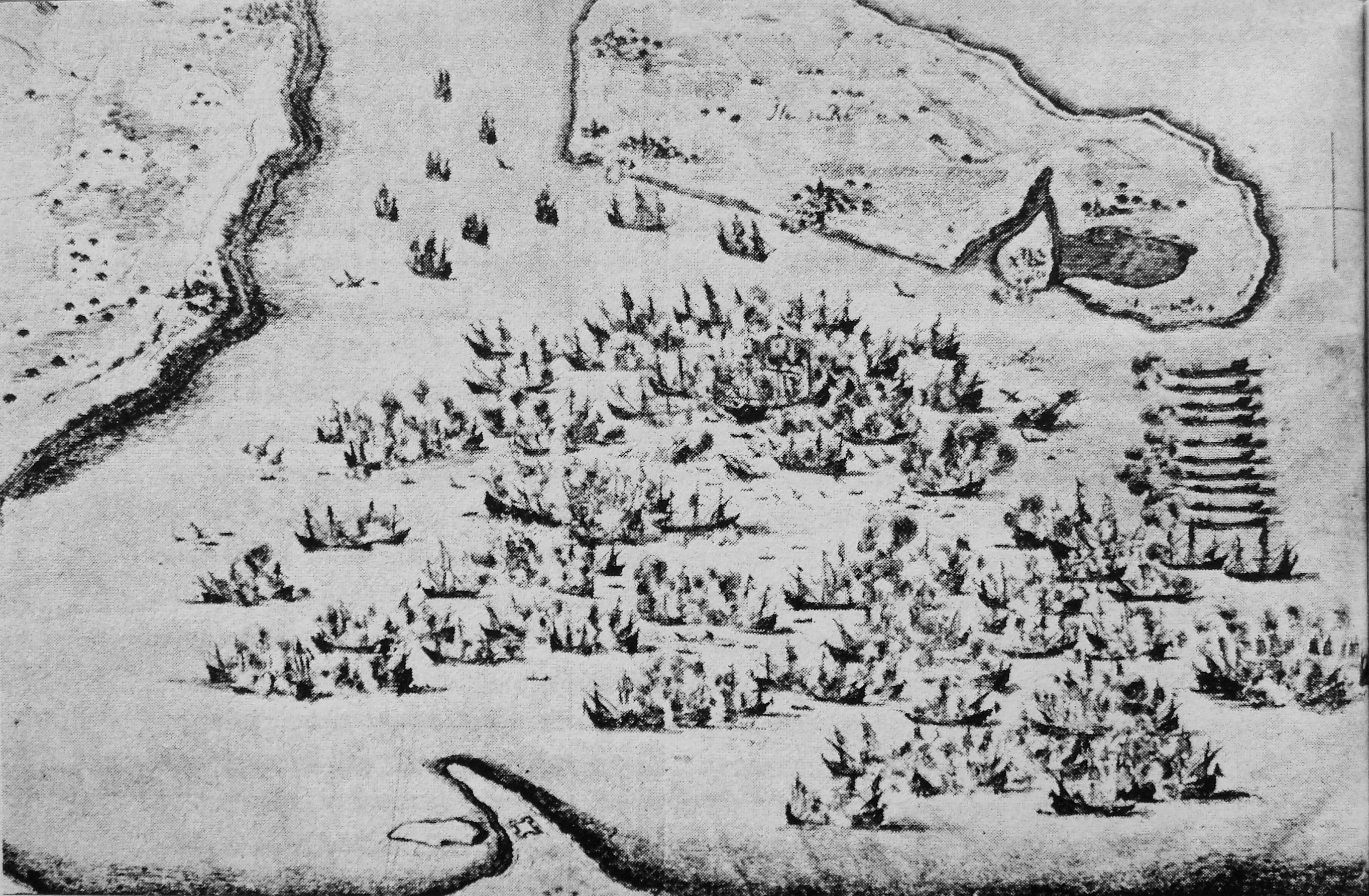
The naval battle in front of Île de Ré in 1622, in which the fleet of La Rochelle was defeated against Charles, Duke of Guise.

He was born in Joinville, the son of Henri I, Duke of Guise and Catherine of Cleves. Originally styled the Chevalier de Guise, he succeeded as Duke of Chevreuse upon the death of his great-uncle Charles of Guise, Cardinal of Lorraine, a title he later resigned to his brother Claude.

After his father's assassination in 1588, Charles succeeded him as Duke of Guise, but was kept in prison in Tours for three years, escaping in 1591. While the Catholic League had great hopes for him, and considered placing him on the throne, he declared his support for Henry IV of France in 1594, for which Henry paid him four million livres and made him Governor of Provence. On 17 February 1596, Charles captured Marseille from the League, restoring it to the French crown.

During the reign of Louis XIII, Charles was created Grand Master of France and Admiral of the Levant.

Falling into disfavour with Cardinal Richelieu for siding with Marie de' Medici, he withdrew to Italy in 1631. His wife and younger children joined him in Florence, where the family was protected by the House of Medici. His sons François and Charles Louis died in Italy during these years of exile. Duke Charles himself died in Cuna in 1640. His widow and children (among them Marie, Mademoiselle de Guise) were permitted to return to France in 1643.

== Family ==
On 6 January 1611 he married Henriette Catherine of Joyeuse (8 January 1585 – 25 February 1656). They had:

- François (3 April 1612 – 7 December 1639), Prince of Joinville, who died in Florence during the family's exile and was buried in the church of San Lorenzo and later reinterred at Joinville. He was deemed "the most accomplished prince of his day."
- Twin boys (4 March 1613 – 19 March 1613), who were very frail and sickly. They died on the same day.
- Henri II, Duke of Guise (1614–1664), Archbishop of Reims
- Marie, Duchess of Guise (1615–1688)
- A girl, called Mademoiselle de Joinville (4 March 1617 – 18 January 1618), who was born healthy but caught a cold in the winter of 1617 and died shortly thereafter.
- Charles Louis (15 July 1618 – 15 March 1637, who also died in Florence) and was buried at San Lorenzo and later at Joinville, styled Duke of Joyeuse
- Françoise Renée (10 January 1621 – 4 December 1682, Montmartre), Abbess of Montmartre
- Louis, Duke of Joyeuse (1622–1654), also Duke of Angoulême
- Roger (21 March 1624 – died 9 September 1653) called the Chevalier de Joinville and later the Chevalier de Guise, Knight of the Order of Malta, died of fever at Cambrai and buried near his ancestors at Joinville.

== Sources ==
- Bernstein, Hilary (2004). Between Crown and Community: Politics and Civic Culture in Sixteenth-century Poitiers. Cornell University Press.
- Collins, James (2017). "Dynasty Instability, the Emergence of the French Monarchical Commonwealth and the Coming of the Rhetoric of L'etat, 1360s to 1650s". In von Friedeburg, Robert; Morrill, John (eds.). Monarchy Transformed: Princes and their Elites in Early Modern Western Europe. Cambridge University Press. p. 87-126.
- Kettering, Sharon (1986). Patrons, Brokers, and Clients in Seventeenth-century France. Oxford University Press.
- Munns, Jessica; Richards, Penny; Spangler, Jonathan, eds. (2015). Aspiration, Representation and Memory: The Guise in Europe, 1506–1688. Ashgate Publishing.
- Schalk, Ellery (2001). Mentzer, Raymond A. (ed.). "Marseille and the Urban Experience in Sixteenth-Century France: Communal Values, Religious Reform and Absolutism". Historical Reflections / Réflexions Historiques. 27, No. 2, Aristocracies and Urban Elites in Early Modern France: A Tribute to Ellery Schalk (Summer): 241-300.
- Spangler, Jonathan (2016). The Society of Princes: The Lorraine-Guise and the Conservation of Power and Wealth in Seventeenth-Century France. Routledge.
- Tenace, Edward Shannon (2012). "Messianic Imperialism or Traditional Dynasticism? The Grand Strategy of Philip II and the Spanish Failure in the Wars of the 1590s". In Andrade, Tonio; Reger, William (eds.). The Limits of Empire: European Imperial Formations in Early Modern World. Ashgate Publishing. p. 281-308.

French nobility
Preceded by Charles I	Duke of Chevreuse; 1574–1606	Succeeded by Claude
Preceded by Henri I	Duke of Guise; Prince of Joinville; Count of Eu; 1588–1640	Succeeded by Henri II
Preceded by Henriette Catherine	Duke of Joyeuse with Henriette Catherine; 1611–1640	Succeeded by Louis
