= Serravalle, Buonconvento =

Serravalle
- Frazione
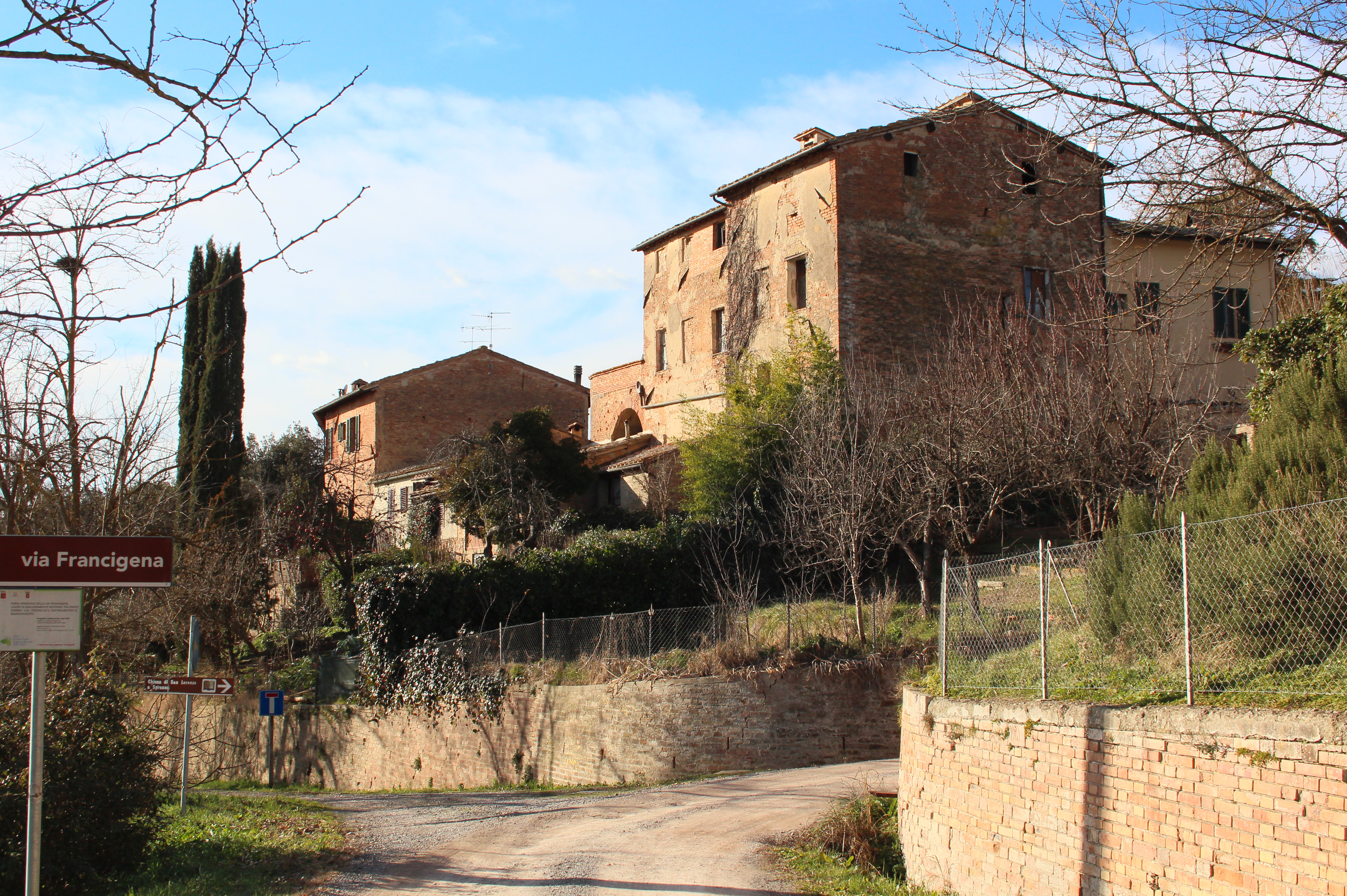

- Location of Serravalle in Italy
- Coordinates: 43°9′40″N 11°28′14″E
- Country: Italy
- Region: Tuscany
- Province: Siena (SI)
- Comune: Buonconvento
- Elevation: 176 m (577 ft)

Population (2011)
  - Total: 17
- Demonym: Serravallesi
- Time zone: UTC+1 (CET)
  - Summer (DST): UTC+2 (CEST)

Serravalle is a village in Tuscany, central Italy, administratively a frazione of the comune of Buonconvento, province of Siena. At the time of the 2001 census, its population was 18.

Serravalle is located about 24 km from Siena and 4 km from Buonconvento.
