= Taverne d'Arbia =

- Frazione
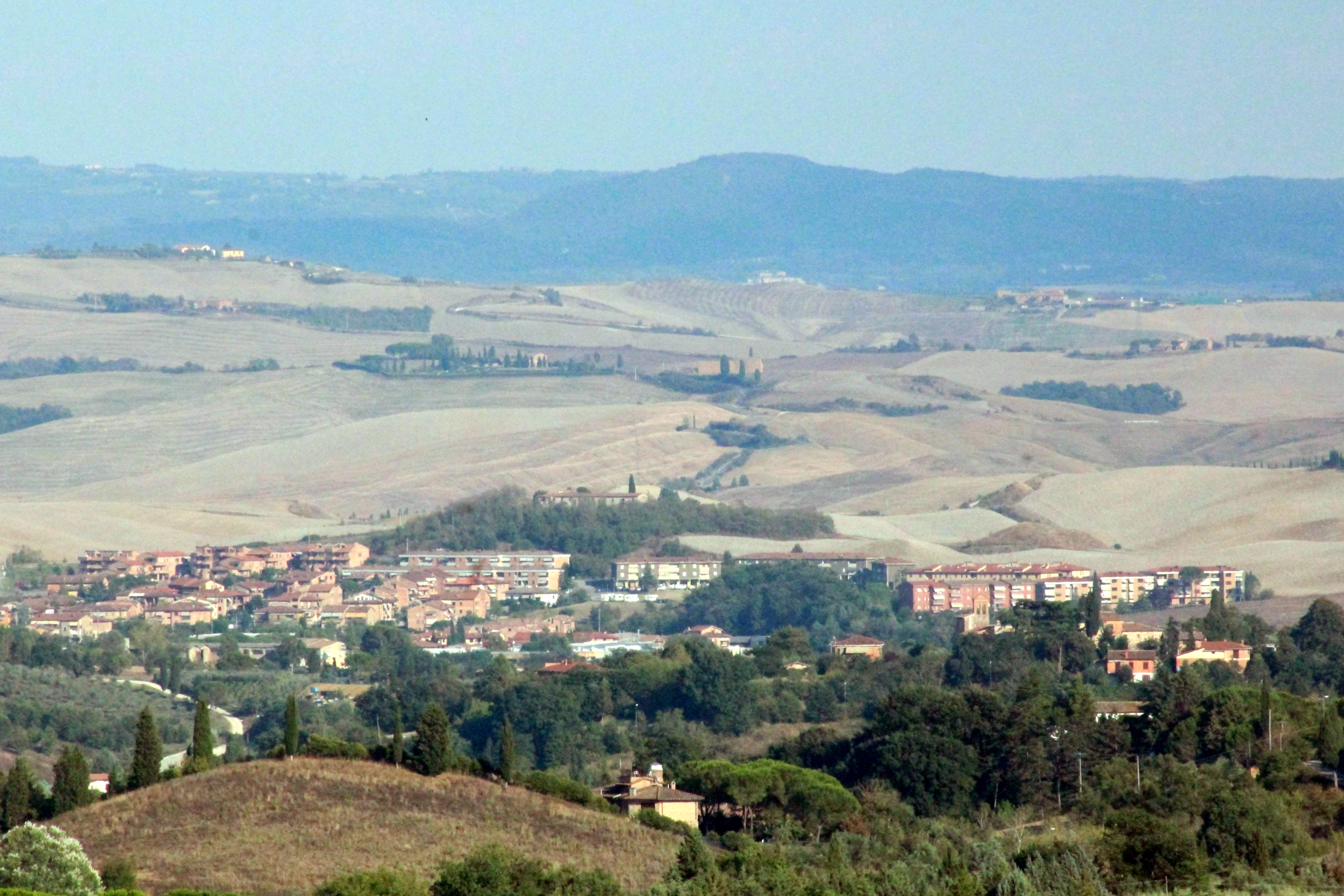
- View of Taverne d'Arbia

- Location of Taverne d'Arbia in Italy
- Coordinates: 43°17′42″N 11°23′59″E
- Country: Italy
- Region: Tuscany
- Province: Siena (SI)
- Comune: Siena
- Elevation: 185 m (607 ft)

Population (2011)
  - Total: 2,416
- Time zone: UTC+1 (CET)
  - Summer (DST): UTC+2 (CEST)

Taverne d'Arbia is a village in Tuscany, central Italy, administratively a frazione of the comune of Siena, province of Siena. At the time of the 2001 census, its population was 2,366.

Taverne d'Arbia is about 8 km from Siena.
