= Cuna, Monteroni d'Arbia =

Cuna
- Frazione
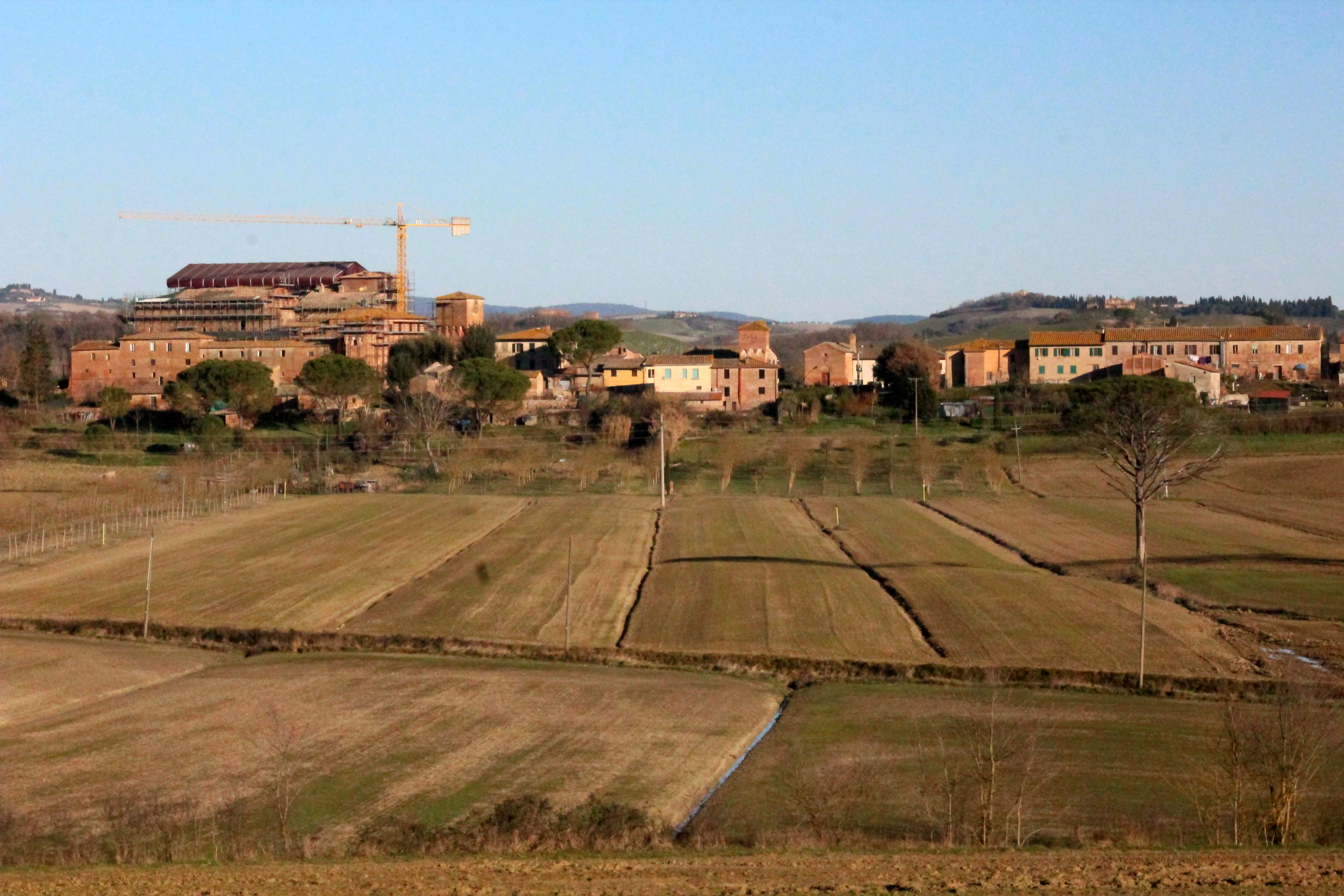
- View of Cuna

- Location of Cuna in Italy
- Coordinates: 43°14′31″N 11°24′13″E
- Country: Italy
- Region: Tuscany
- Province: Siena (SI)
- Comune: Monteroni d'Arbia
- Elevation: 180 m (590 ft)

Population (2011)
  - Total: 515
- Demonym: Cunesi / Cunaioli
- Time zone: UTC+1 (CET)
  - Summer (DST): UTC+2 (CEST)

Cuna is a village in Tuscany, central Italy, administratively a frazione of the comune of Monteroni d'Arbia, province of Siena. At the time of the 2001 census its population was 464.
