= Lucignano d'Arbia =

- Frazione
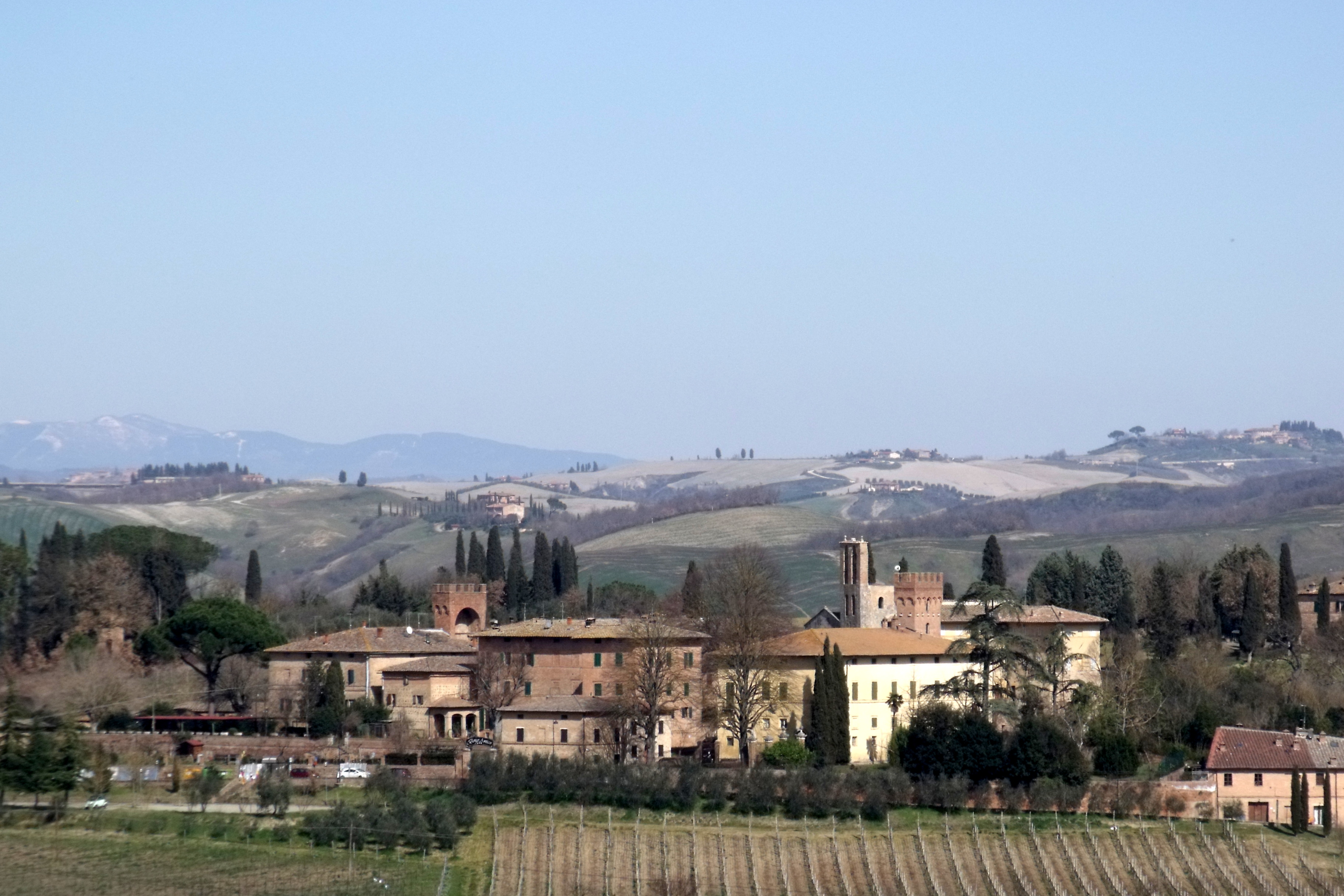
- View of Lucignano d'Arbia

- Location of Lucignano d'Arbia in Italy
- Coordinates: 43°12′44″N 11°26′9″E
- Country: Italy
- Region: Tuscany
- Province: Siena (SI)
- Comune: Monteroni d'Arbia
- Elevation: 193 m (633 ft)

Population (2011)
  - Total: 127
- Demonym: Lucignanesi
- Time zone: UTC+1 (CET)
  - Summer (DST): UTC+2 (CEST)

Lucignano d'Arbia is a village in Tuscany, central Italy, administratively a frazione of the comune of Monteroni d'Arbia, province of Siena. At the time of the 2001 census its population was 127.
