= Vico d'Arbia =

- Frazione
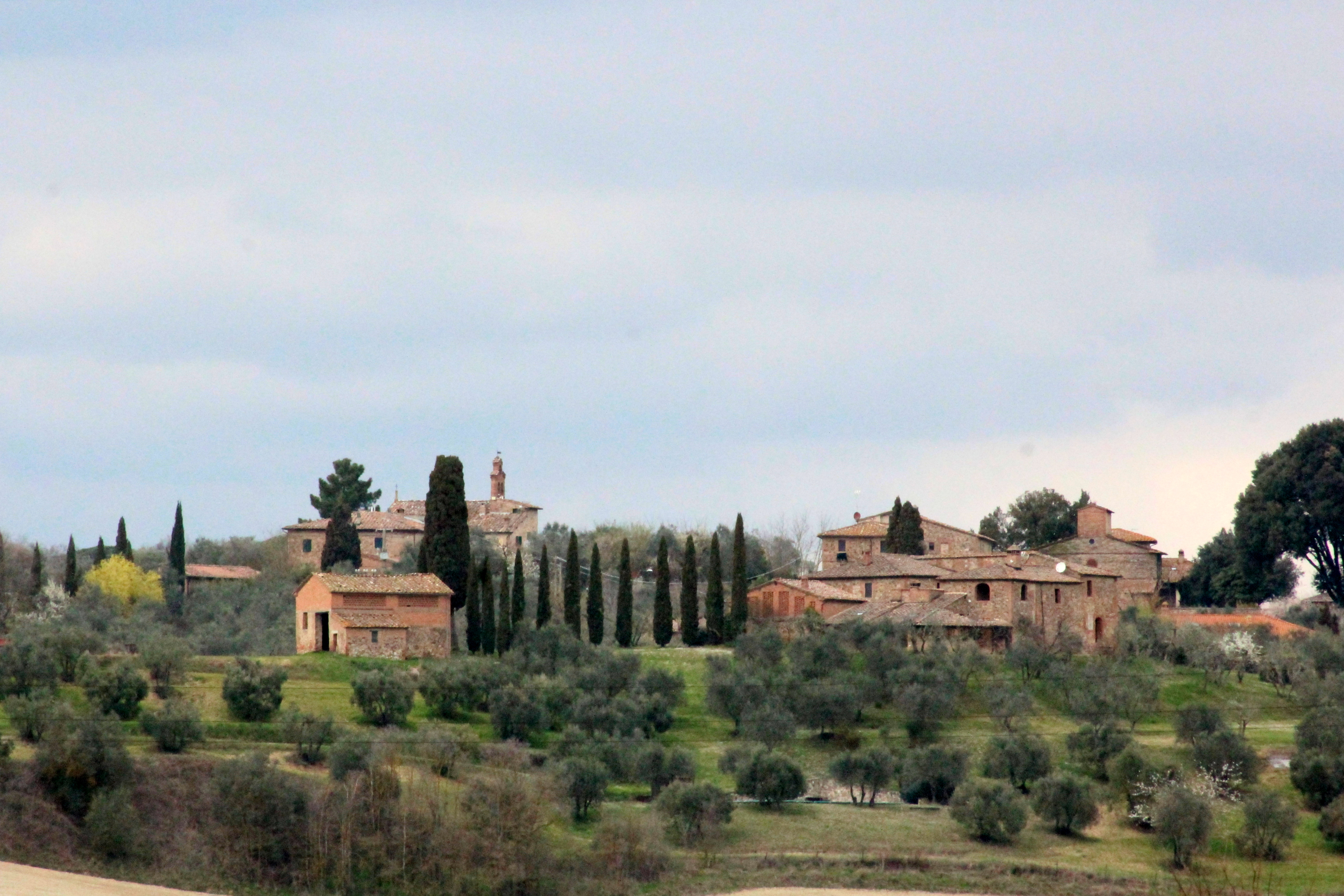
- View of Vico d'Arbia

- Location of Vico d'Arbia in Italy
- Coordinates: 43°19′28″N 11°24′55″E
- Country: Italy
- Region: Tuscany
- Province: Siena (SI)
- Comune: Siena
- Elevation: 263 m (863 ft)

Population 21
  - Total: 2,011
- Time zone: UTC+1 (CET)
  - Summer (DST): UTC+2 (CEST)

Vico d'Arbia is a village in Tuscany, central Italy, in the comune of Siena, province of Siena. At the time of the 2001 census its population was 29.

Vico d'Arbia is about 15 km from Siena.
