= Buonconvento =

- Comune
- Comune di Buonconvento
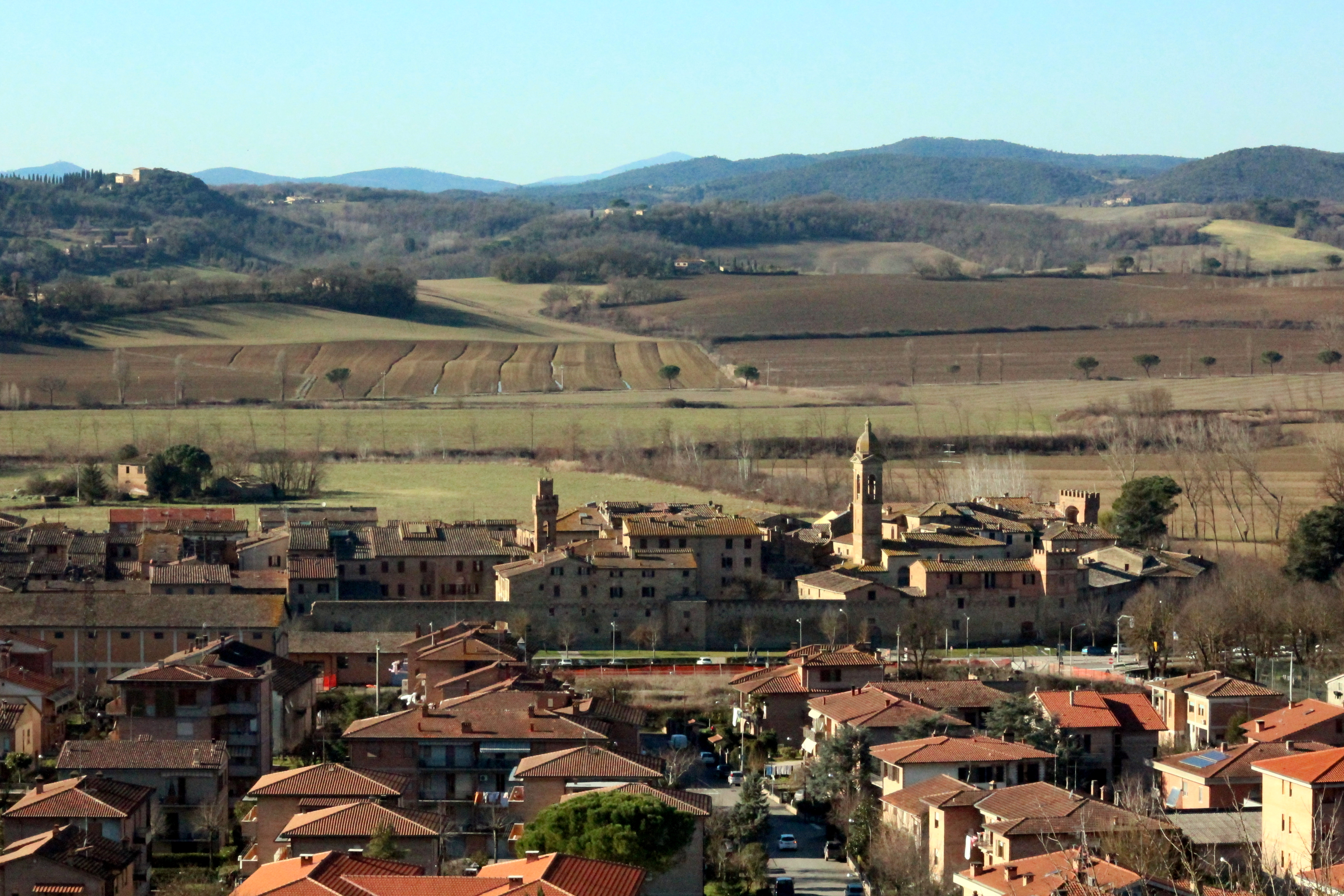

- Coat of arms

- Location within Italy Location within Tuscany
- Coordinates: 43°8′N 11°29′E
- Country: Italy
- Region: Tuscany
- Province: Siena (SI)
- Frazioni: Bibbiano, Ponte d'Arbia, Serravalle

Government
  - Mayor: Riccardo Conti

Area
  - Total: 64.84 km^{2} (25.03 sq mi)
- Elevation: 147 m (482 ft)

Population (30 April 2017)
  - Total: 3,137
  - Density: 48.38/km^{2} (125.3/sq mi)
- Demonym: Buonconventini
- Time zone: UTC+1 (CET)
  - Summer (DST): UTC+2 (CEST)
- Postal code: 53022
- Dialing code: 0577
- Patron saint: Sts. Peter and Paul
- Saint day: June 29
- Website: Official website

Buonconvento is a comune (municipality) in the Province of Siena in the Italian region Tuscany, located about 70 kilometres (43 mi) south of Florence and about 25 kilometres (16 mi) southeast of Siena in the area known as the Crete Senesi. It is one of I Borghi più belli d'Italia ("The most beautiful villages of Italy").

== History ==
Buonconvento (from the Latin bonus conventus, "happy place") is mentioned for the first time in 1100. In 1313 the German emperor Henry VII died here.

It was surrounded by a line of walls starting from 1371, carried on by the Republic of Siena to which it belonged until 1559, when it became part of the Grand Duchy of Tuscany. It was annexed to Italy in 1861.

== Main sights ==
The local museum of art, the Museo d'Arte Sacra della Val d'Arbia, houses works by Duccio di Buoninsegna, Pietro Lorenzetti, Andrea di Bartolo, Matteo di Giovanni and other Tuscan painters, taken from local churches. The church of Santi Pietro e Paolo has a Madonna Enthroned with Child (c. 1450) by Matteo di Giovanni and an early-fifteenth century fresco of the Sienese school. The fortified pieve of Sant'Innocenza a Piana dates from the thirteenth and fourteenth centuries. Most of Buonconvento's frazioni house medieval or Renaissance castles.

The church of St. Lawrence in Bibbiano has a cyborium by Ventura Salimbeni.

== Frazioni ==
Inhabited places in the comune consist of the town of Buonconvento, the frazioni of Bibbiano, Ponte d'Arbia and Serravalle, and other settlements including Castelnuovo Tancredi, Chiatina, Percenna and Piana.
