= Monteroni d'Arbia =

- Comune
- Comune di Monteroni d'Arbia
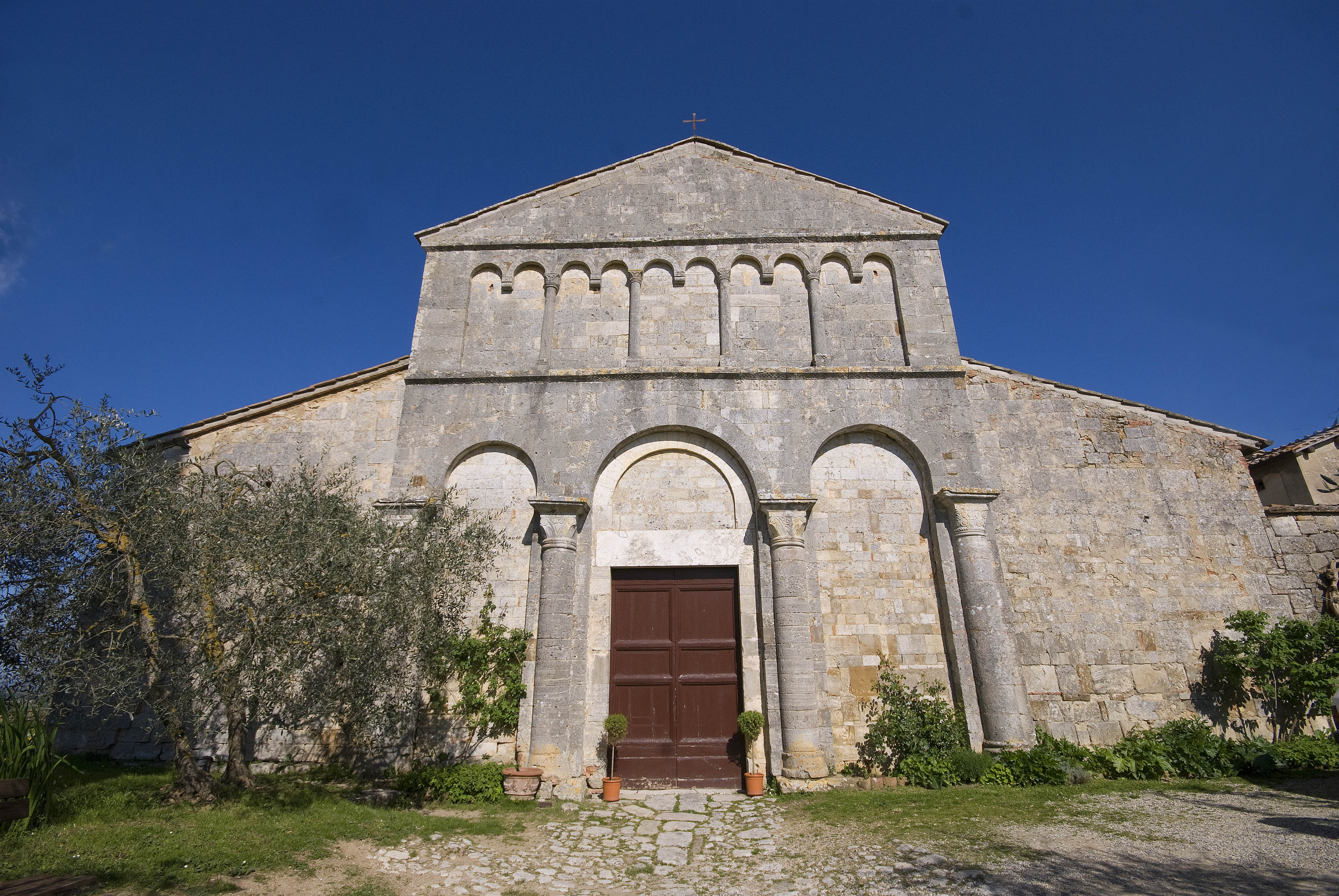
- Pieve of St. John the Baptist in the frazione of Corsano

- Coat of arms

- Location within Italy Location within Tuscany
- Coordinates: 43°14′N 11°25′E
- Country: Italy
- Region: Tuscany
- Province: Siena (SI)
- Frazioni: Cuna, Lucignano d'Arbia, Ponte a Tressa, Ponte d'Arbia, Quinciano, Radi, Ville di Corsano

Government
  - Mayor: Gabriele Berni

Area
  - Total: 105.91 km^{2} (40.89 sq mi)
- Elevation: 161 m (528 ft)

Population (30 November 2017)
  - Total: 9,069
  - Density: 85.63/km^{2} (221.8/sq mi)
- Demonym: Monteronesi
- Time zone: UTC+1 (CET)
  - Summer (DST): UTC+2 (CEST)
- Postal code: 53014
- Dialing code: 0577
- Website: Official website

Monteroni d'Arbia is a comune (municipality) in the Province of Siena in the Italian region Tuscany, located about 60 kilometres (37 mi) south of Florence and about 13 kilometres (8 mi) southeast of Siena in the area known as the Crete Senesi. It takes its names from the Arbia torrent, a tributary of the Ombrone River.

== Main sights ==
The pieve of Saint John the Baptist, at Corsano, dates from before 1031. With a nave and two aisles, it is an example of Romanesque architecture with Pisan and Lombard influences. It houses two canvasses by Alessandro Casolari.

The church of Saints James and Christopher in Cuna has remains of 14th-century frescoes.

== People ==
- Cesare Maccari, painter, lived in the hamlet of Quinciano
