= Ponte a Tressa =

- Frazione
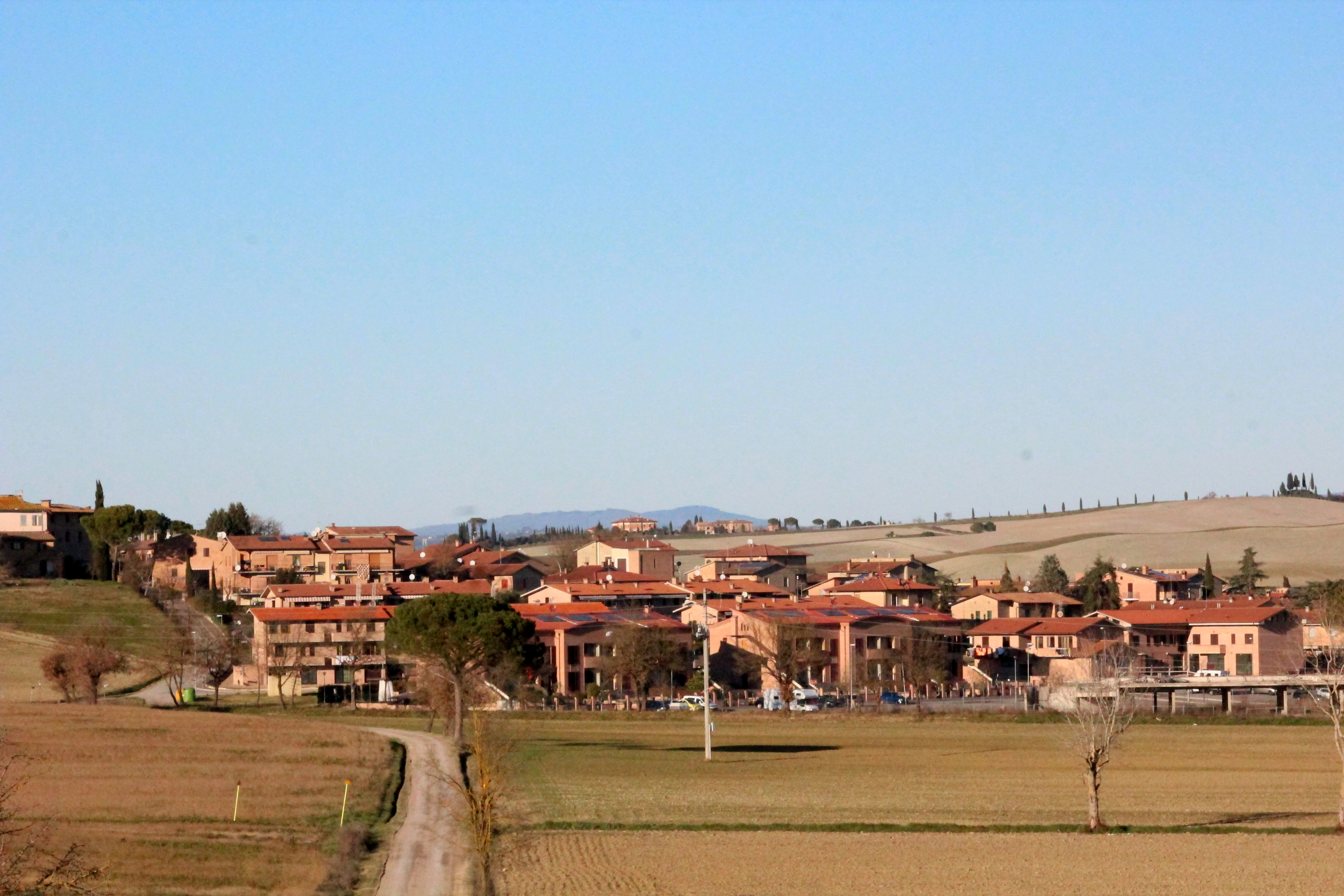
- View of Ponte a Tressa

- Location of Ponte a Tressa in Italy
- Coordinates: 43°15′5″N 11°23′45″E
- Country: Italy
- Region: Tuscany
- Province: Siena (SI)
- Comune: Monteroni d'Arbia
- Elevation: 182 m (597 ft)

Population (2011)
  - Total: 1,353
- Demonym: Tressini / Tressaioli
- Time zone: UTC+1 (CET)
  - Summer (DST): UTC+2 (CEST)

Ponte a Tressa is a village in Tuscany, central Italy, administratively a frazione of the comune of Monteroni d'Arbia, province of Siena. At the time of the 2001 census its population was 950.
