= Quinciano =

- Frazione
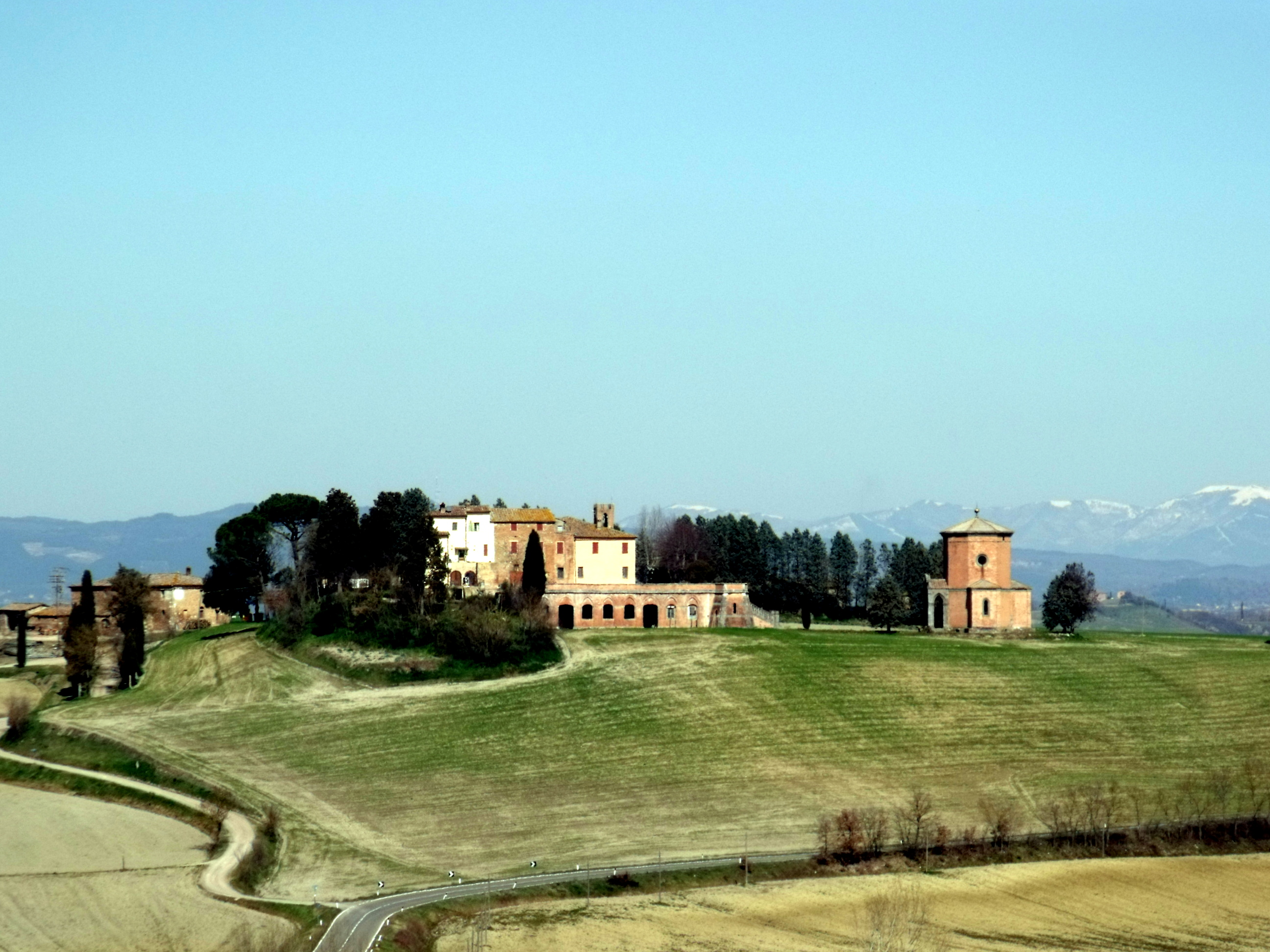
- View of Quinciano

- Location of Quinciano in Italy
- Coordinates: 43°12′20″N 11°25′42″E
- Country: Italy
- Region: Tuscany
- Province: Siena (SI)
- Comune: Monteroni d'Arbia
- Elevation: 207 m (679 ft)

Population (2011)
  - Total: 29
- Time zone: UTC+1 (CET)
  - Summer (DST): UTC+2 (CEST)

Quinciano is a village in Tuscany, central Italy, administratively a frazione of the comune of Monteroni d'Arbia, province of Siena. At the time of the 2001 census its population was 17.

Quinciano is about 20 km from Siena and 5 km from Monteroni d'Arbia.
