= Castell'Ottieri =

- Frazione
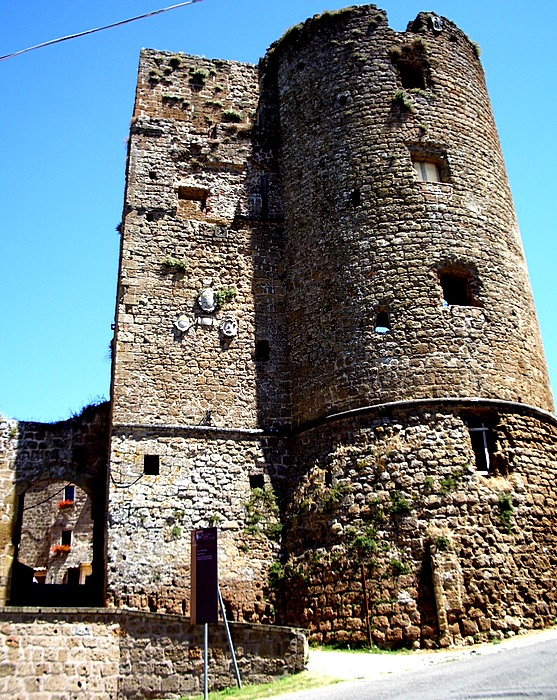
- The Rocca degli Ottieri

- Location of Castell'Ottieri in Italy
- Coordinates: 42°43′54″N 11°45′5″E
- Country: Italy
- Region: Tuscany
- Province: Grosseto (GR)
- Comune: Sorano
- Elevation: 472 m (1,549 ft)

Population (2011)
  - Total: 163
- Demonym: Castellesi
- Time zone: UTC+1 (CET)
  - Summer (DST): UTC+2 (CEST)
- Postal code: 58010
- Dialing code: (+39) 0564

Castell'Ottieri is a village in Tuscany, central Italy, administratively a frazione of the comune of Sorano, province of Grosseto, in the tuff area of southern Maremma. At the time of the 2001 census its population amounted to 195.

Castell'Ottieri is about 90 km from Grosseto and 10 km from Sorano, and it is situated along the Provincial Road which links Sorano to Castell'Azzara. Ancient capital of the small County of Ottieri, Castell'Ottieri is now a pittoresque Renaissance village.

== Main sights ==
- San Bartolomeo (16th century), main parish church of the village, it was built in 1590 and contains some Baroque paintings.
- Santa Maria (17th century)
- Rocca degli Ottieri, old castle built by Aldobrandeschis in the Middle Ages, it was re-built during the Renaissance by the Ottieri, as the seat of the county.

== Bibliography ==
- (in Italian) Emanuele Repetti, «Castell'Ottieri», Dizionario Geografico Fisico Storico della Toscana, 1833–1846.
- Aldo Mazzolai, Guida della Maremma. Percorsi tra arte e natura, Florence, Le Lettere, 1997.

== See also ==
- Cerreto, Sorano
- Elmo, Sorano
- Montebuono, Sorano
- Montevitozzo
- Montorio, Sorano
- San Giovanni delle Contee
- San Quirico, Sorano
- San Valentino, Sorano
- Sovana
