= Sovana Cathedral =

Church building in Sovana, Italy

Coordinates: 42.6563°N 11.6417°E

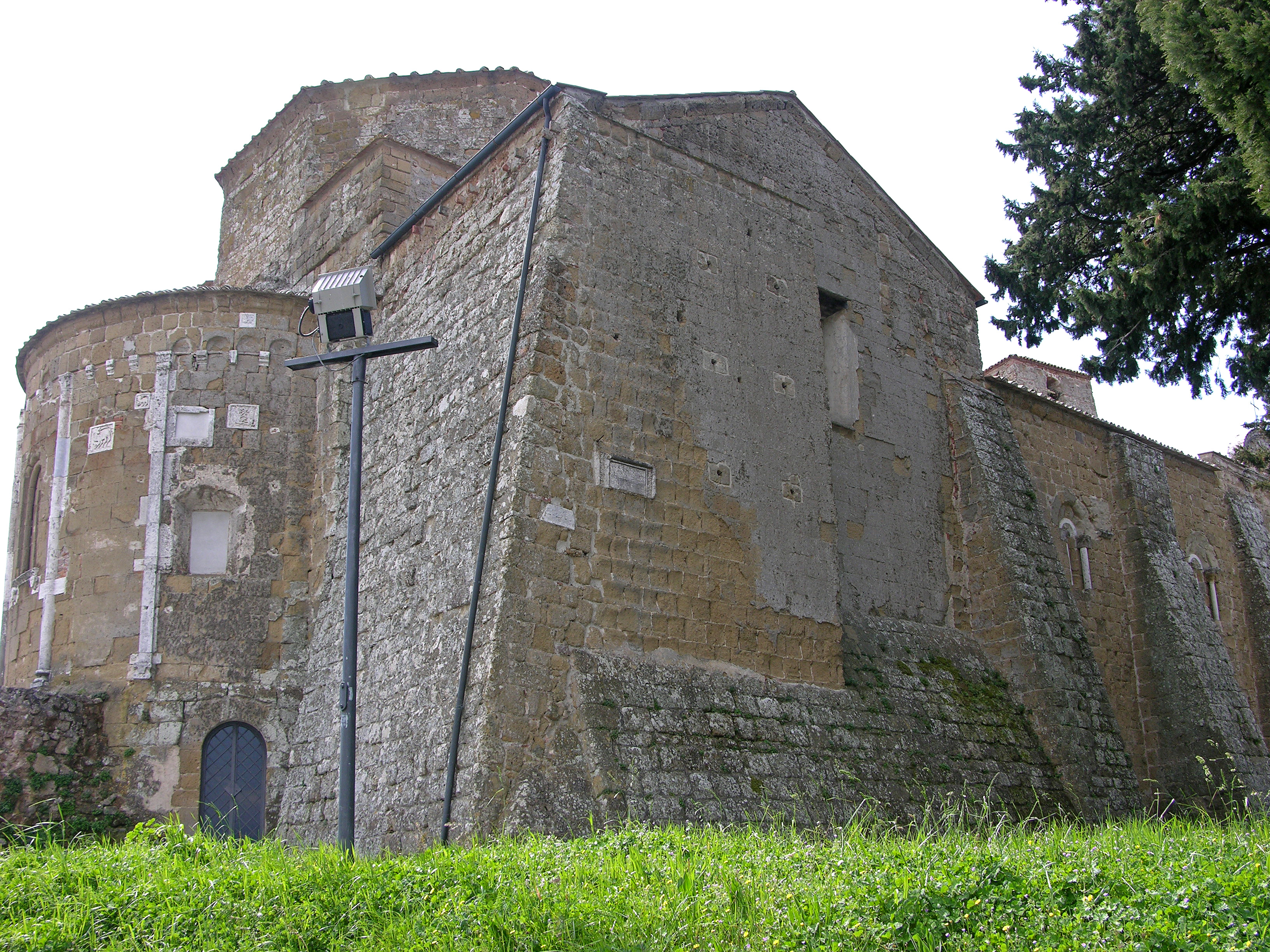
Sovana Cathedral

Sovana Cathedral (Italian: Duomo di Sovana; Concattedrale di San Pietro) is a Roman Catholic cathedral in Sovana, now a frazione of the town of Sorano, in the province of Grosseto, region of Tuscany, Italy, dedicated to Saint Peter. Formerly the episcopal seat of the Diocese of Sovana (from 1844 the Diocese of Sovana e Pitigliano, and from 1981 the Diocese of Sovana-Pitigliano-Orbetello), since 1986 it has been a co-cathedral in the diocese of Pitigliano-Sovana-Orbetello.

== History ==
Tradition holds that Sovana was made a bishopric in the 5th century. A church on the site, still evident in the crypt, was founded in the 8th to 9th centuries and documented in a bull by Pope Nicholas II in 1061. It was reconstructed in Romanesque architectural style in 1248. The Bishop of Palermo, Mamiliano, carried out evangelisation work in Sovana at the beginning of the 4th century. This early conversion to Christianity earned Sovana its appointment as an episcopal see in the 5th century.

== See also ==
- High medieval domes
- A crossroads of cultures in an intimate and cozy setting
