= Vitozza =

Settlement in Sorano, Tuscany, Italy

Coordinates: 42°40′40″N 11°45′25″E

Vitozza is a cave settlement located near the village of San Quirico in the municipality of Sorano, in the province of Grosseto, southern Tuscany (Italy), which was inhabited from Etruscan times until the end of the 18th century.

== History ==
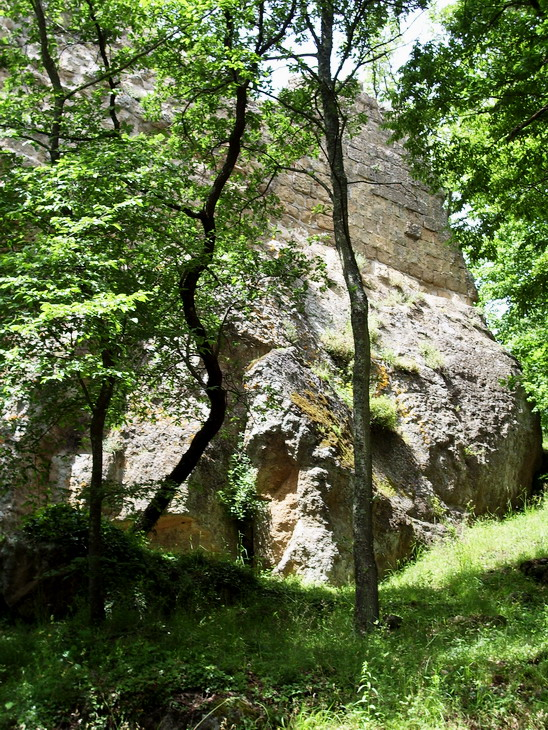
The first castle of Vitozza

The ancient city of Vitozza was built in the medieval era, most likely at the end of the 11th century, around a castle built by the Aldobrandeschi family within a cave settlement which was most likely already inhabited during Etruscan and Roman times.

In the first half of the 13th century, Vitozza passed temporarily under the control of Orvieto and then the Basque family, before being taken up again by the Aldobrandeschi and included into the territory of County of Sovana in 1274, the year of the division of family assets.

Between the end of the 13th and the early 14th century, the place was conquered by the Republic of Siena under which it stayed until the middle of the 15th century. Subsequently, Vitozza became part of County Orsini, but later there was a move away from the castle and its defensive structures for reasons yet unknown, causing the decline of the settlement. The population gradually migrated towards the nearby town of San Quirico, however, Vitozza was inhabited until the end of the 18th century.

== Archaeological Area ==
In the Middle Ages, Vitozza had a fortified castle, at least two fortresses, and places of worship including a major and two minor churches, in addition to the cave settlement.

=== Settlement ===
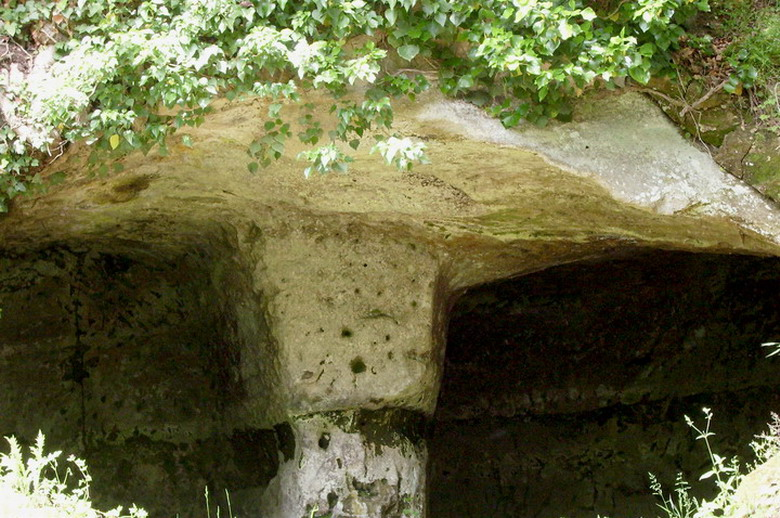
Detail of a residential cave

The cave settlement of Vitozza is certainly the largest and most important of central Italy. It includes over two hundred caves excavated from the local tuff stone.

The caves used for human habitation extend along a path through the woods overlooking the valley of the river Lente. Some are quite close to each other, while others tend to be more isolated.

Depending on their type, caves can in fact be classified in four different types:

The first group is characterized by tunnels with rectangular openings which are often on different levels, connected by ladders and steps, with houses located on the upper levels and animal shelters in the lower ones.

A second group of caves presents rectangular structures destined to house the animals.

A third type of caves was for mixed use - they are characterized by an arched opening, a circular area and attached rooms. The circular part, for animal use, was equipped with a feeder, the other rooms were probably used for habitation.

The northwestern part of Vitozza includes a group of dozens of caves known as columbaria which almost certainly were created in Roman times and remained active throughout the Middle Ages for the purpose of pigeon breeding, a common practice in the territory of Sorano.

=== Fortresses ===
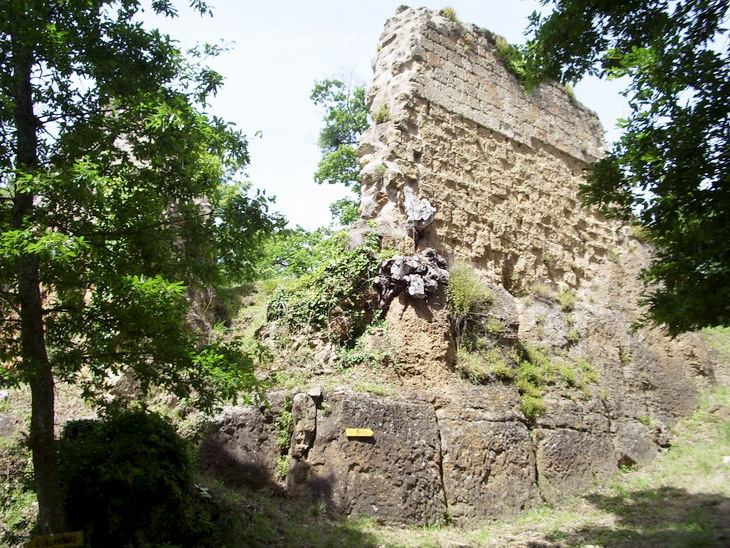
The Second Castle of Vitozza

The primo castello (first castle) is a fortification located along the path that runs through the entire rock settlement. The fortification is the first of two elevated fortifications or rocche shaping the castle ruins of medieval Vitozza. The structure shows thick walls of blocks of tuff, which would take up a door that opened along the access route. The remains of the fortress are visible on both sides of the path that forks just before. On the north side, the building was surrounded by a moat, now rendered invisible by vegetation, which further protected the defensive structure.

The secondo castello (second castle) is a fortified structure located along the path leading to the columbaria (caves used for rearing poultry) and the source of the river Lente. It is situated on a hill which rises to the right of the path, and is better preserved than the first fortress.

=== Chiesaccia ===
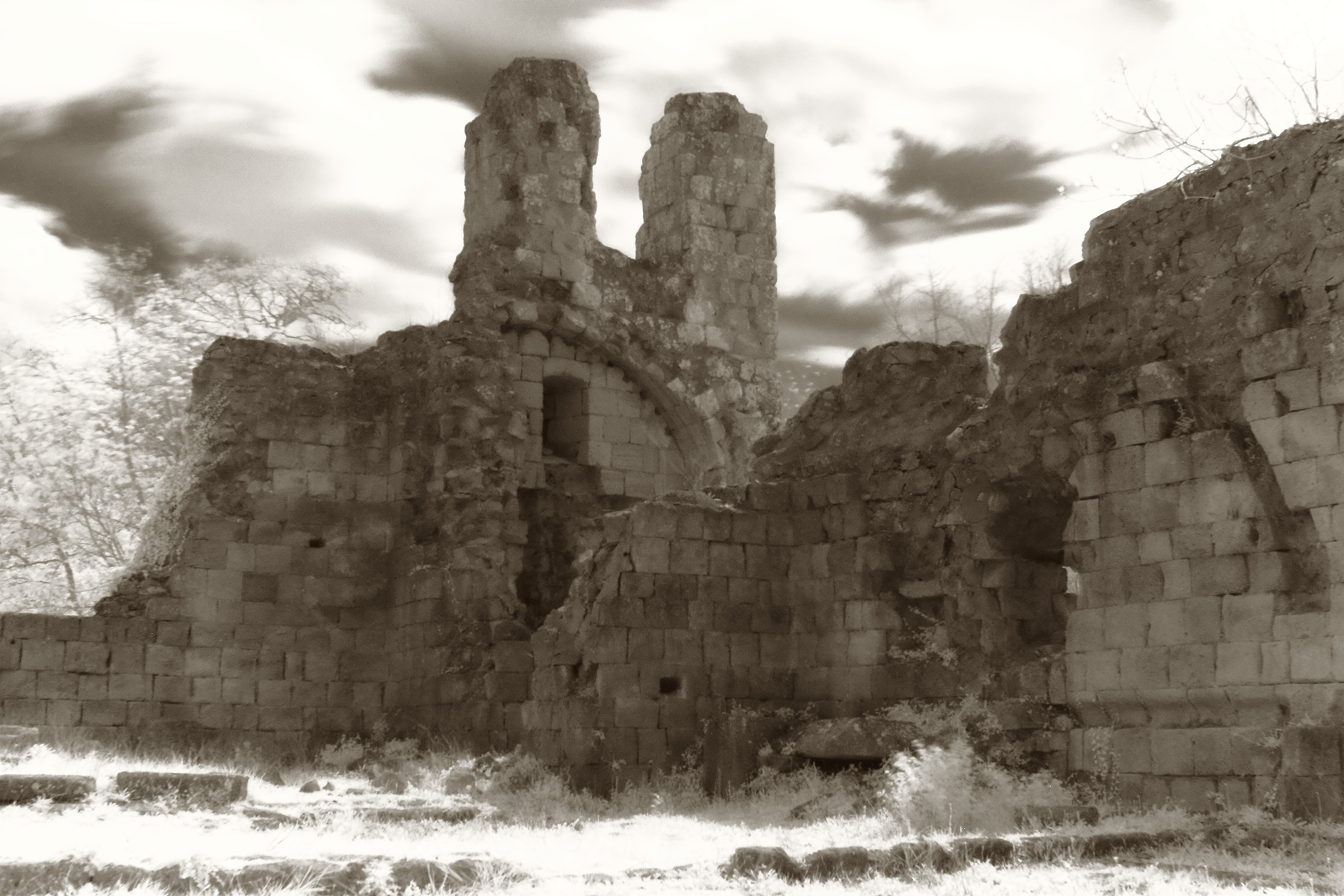
Chiesaccia at Vitozza

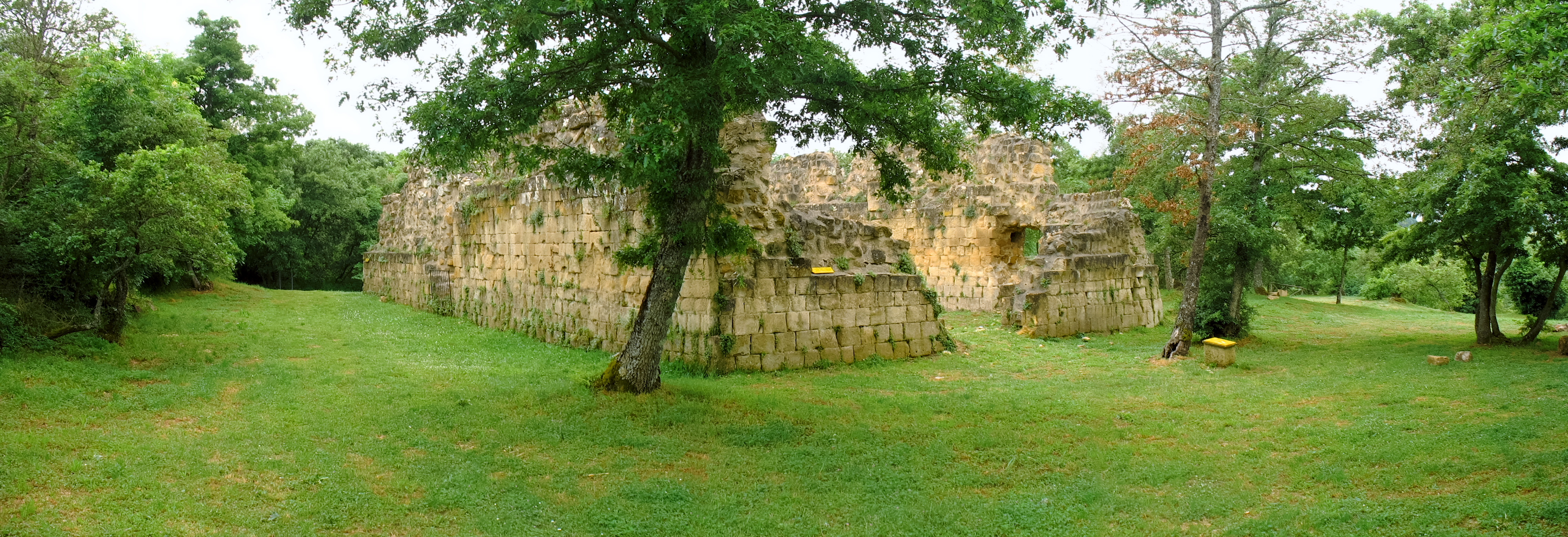
Chiesaccia

The ruins of a church dating back to the Middle Ages, called The Chiesaccia, is situated to the right of the main path near the primo castello. It has a simple rectangular floor plan and a semicircular apse.

On the northern side of the plateau near the church are the ruins of another defensive building, as well as the remains of a gate that controlled access through the road parallel to the ridge.
