= County of Santa Fiora =

Historical state of southern Tuscany,

County of Santa Fiora Contea di Santa Fiora (Italian)
- 1274–1806
- Coat of arms

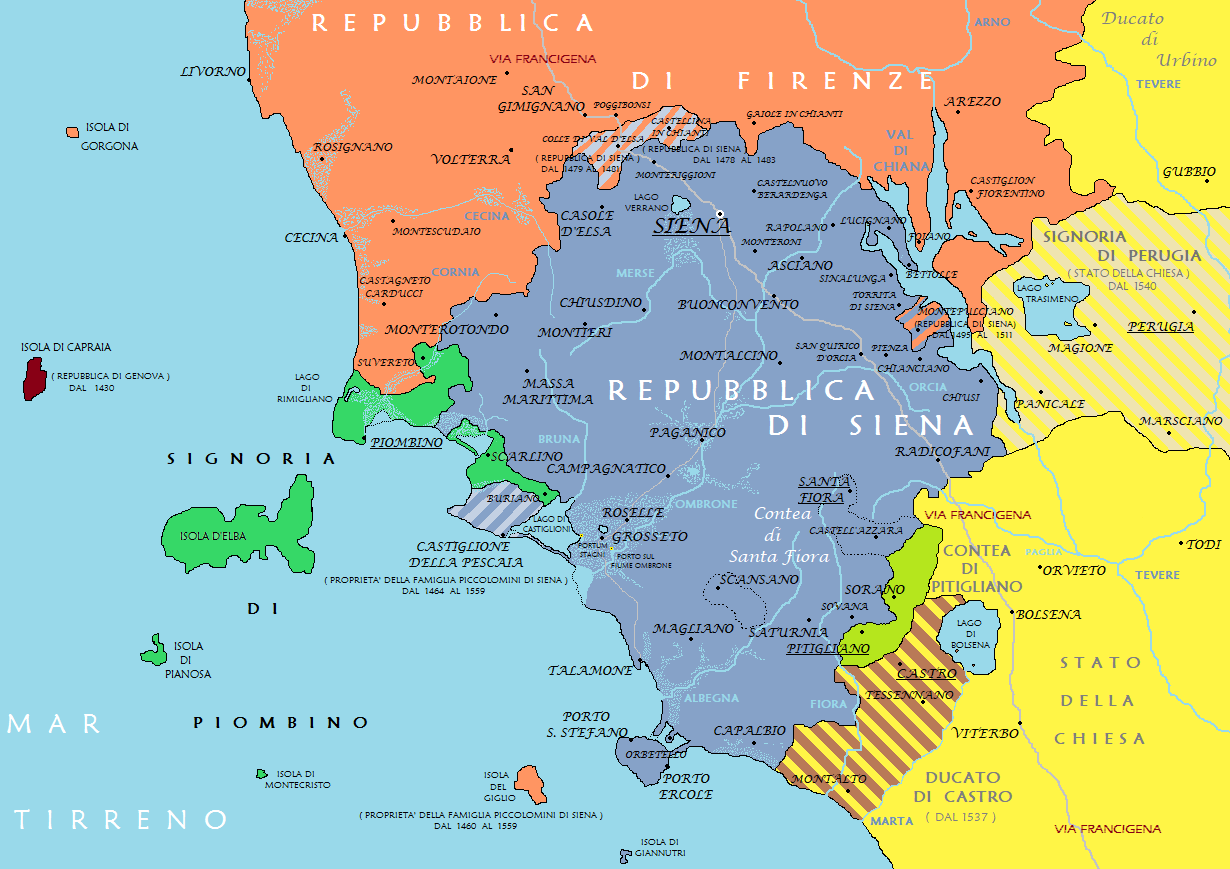
- 15th and 16th centuries

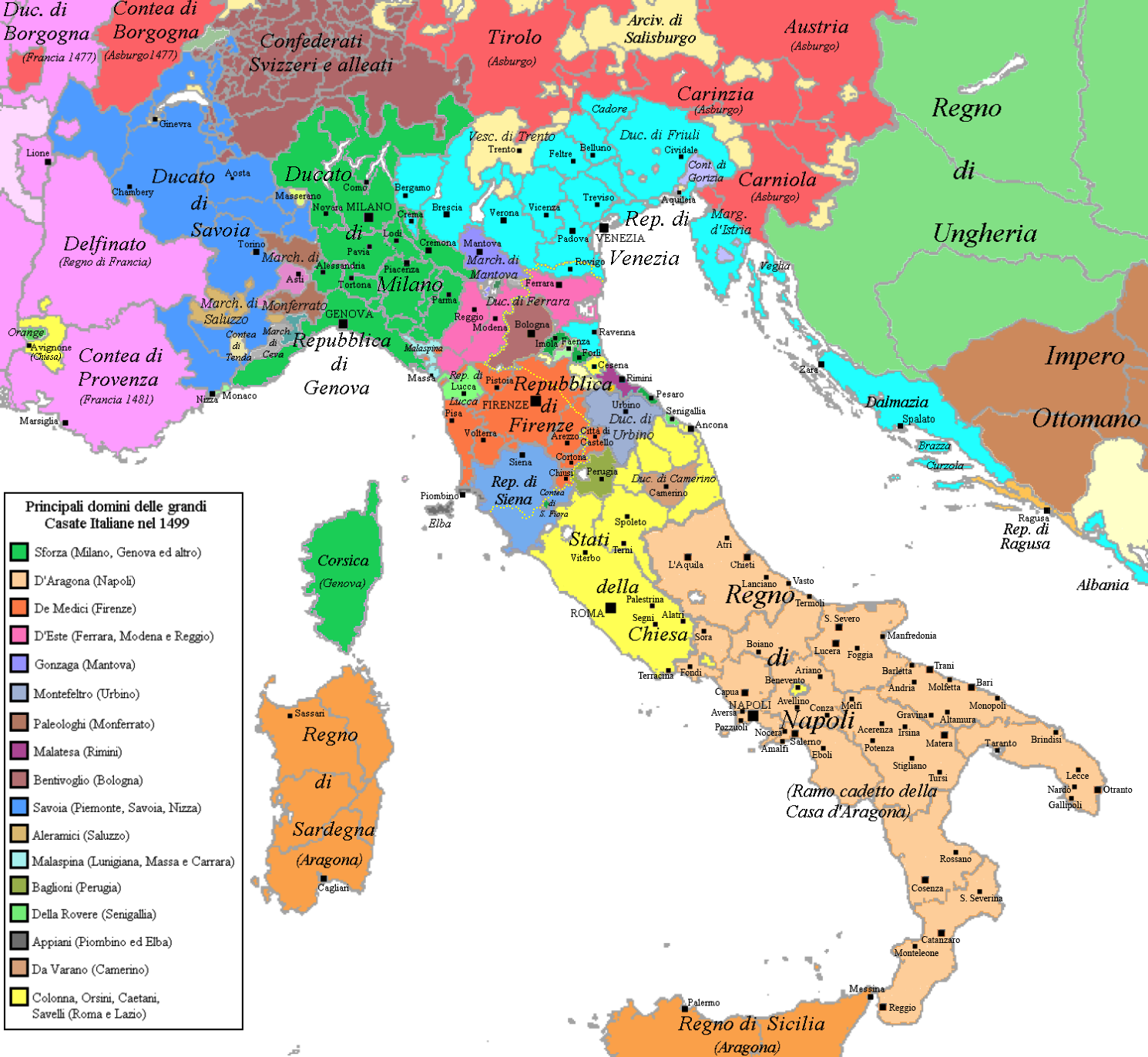
- Italy in 1499
- Capital: Santa Fiora
- Common languages: Tuscan; Latin; Italian
- Religion: Roman Catholicism; Minority: Judaism
- Government: Absolute Monarchy (County)
- Count
  - 1274–1283: Ildebrandino X Aldobrandeschi
  - 1631–1658: Mario II Sforza
- History
  - Division of the lands of Aldobrandeschi family in two branches: 1274
  - The County is annexed by the Grand Duchy of Tuscany: 1633
  - Disestablished: 1806
Preceded by	Succeeded by
Contado; Contado of the Aldobrandeschi	Grand Duchy of Tuscany; Papal States

The County of Santa Fiora (Italian: Contea di Santa Fiora), also known as State of Santa Fiora (Italian: Stato di Santa Fiora) was a small historical state of southern Tuscany, in central Italy. Together with the county of Sovana, it was one of the two subdivisions into which the possessions of the Aldobrandeschi, then lords of much of southern Tuscany, were split in 1274.

At the moments of its creation it included part of today's province of Grosseto, up to the Isola del Giglio, and Castiglione d'Orcia, in what is now the province of Siena. In the 14th century the Republic of Siena was able to capture Isola del Giglio, Roccastrada, Istia d'Ombrone, Magliano in Toscana, Selvena, Arcidosso and Castiglione d'Orcia, reducing the county to its capital, Castell'Azzara, Semproniano and Scansano.

In 1439, after the marriage of Bosio I Sforza and the last Aldobrandeschi heir, Cecilia, the county was inherited by the Sforza family, who would become ruler of the Duchy of Milan and owned also other possessions in Tuscany and the Marche.

The sovereignty of the county was ceded to the Grand Duchy of Tuscany in 1633.

The Jewish presence in the County of Santa Fiora was significant, the first evidence dates back to the second half of the 15th century, while a jewish ghetto was established in 1714, when the state was already subject to the Grand Duchy of Tuscany for about 80 years.

== Ruling counts (1216-1806) ==
#	Title	Name	Start	End	Consort	Notes
1	Count	Bonifacio Aldobrandeschi	1216	1229		Ruling house of Aldobrandeschi
2	Count	Ildebrandino (X)	1229	1283		
3	Count	Ildebrandino (XII)	1283	1331		
4	Conte	Stefano	1331	1346		
5	Count	Senese	1346	1386		
6	Count	Guido I Aldobrandeschi	1386	1438	Elisabetta Salimbeni	
7	Countess	Cecilia Aldobrandeschi	1438	1451	Bosio I Sforza, brother of Francesco I Sforza	
8	Count	Bosio I Sforza	1439	1476	Widower of countess Cecilia Aldobrandeschi	Ruling house changes to Sforza
9	Count	Guido II Sfora di Santa Fiora	1476	1508	Francesca Farnese	
10	Count	Federico I Sforza di Santa Fiora	1508	1517	Bartolomea Orsini di Pitigliano	
11	Count	Bosio II Sforza di Santa Fiora	1517	1535	Costanza Farnese	
12	Count	Sforza I Sforza	1535	1575	Luisa Pallavicino, Caterina Nobili	
13	Count	Mario I Sforza di Santa Fiora	1575	1591	Fulvia Conti	
14	Count	Alessandro I Sforza di Santa Fiora	1591	1631	Eleonora Orsini di Bracciano	
15	Count	Mario II Sforza di Santa Fiora	1631	1658	Renata di Lorena	
16	Count	Ludovico I di Santa Fiora	1658	1685	Artemisia Colonna, Adelaide di Thianges	
17	Count	Francesco I di Santa Fiora	1685	1707	Dorotea Tocco	
18	Count	Federico II Sforza di Santa Fiora	1707	1712	Livia Cesarini	
19	Count	Gaetano I Sforza-Cesarini	1712	1727	Vittoria Conti	Ruling house changes to Sforza-Cesarini
20	Count	Sforza Giuseppe I	1727	1744	Maria Francesca Giustiniani	
21	Count	Filippo I	1744	1764	Anna Maria Colonna Barberini	
22	Count	Gaetano II Sforza Cesarini	1764	1776	Teresa Caracciolo, Marianna Caetani	
23	Count	Francesco II Sforza Cesarini	1776	1806	Geltrude Conti; ultimo conte sovrano	
