= Montevitozzo =

- Frazione
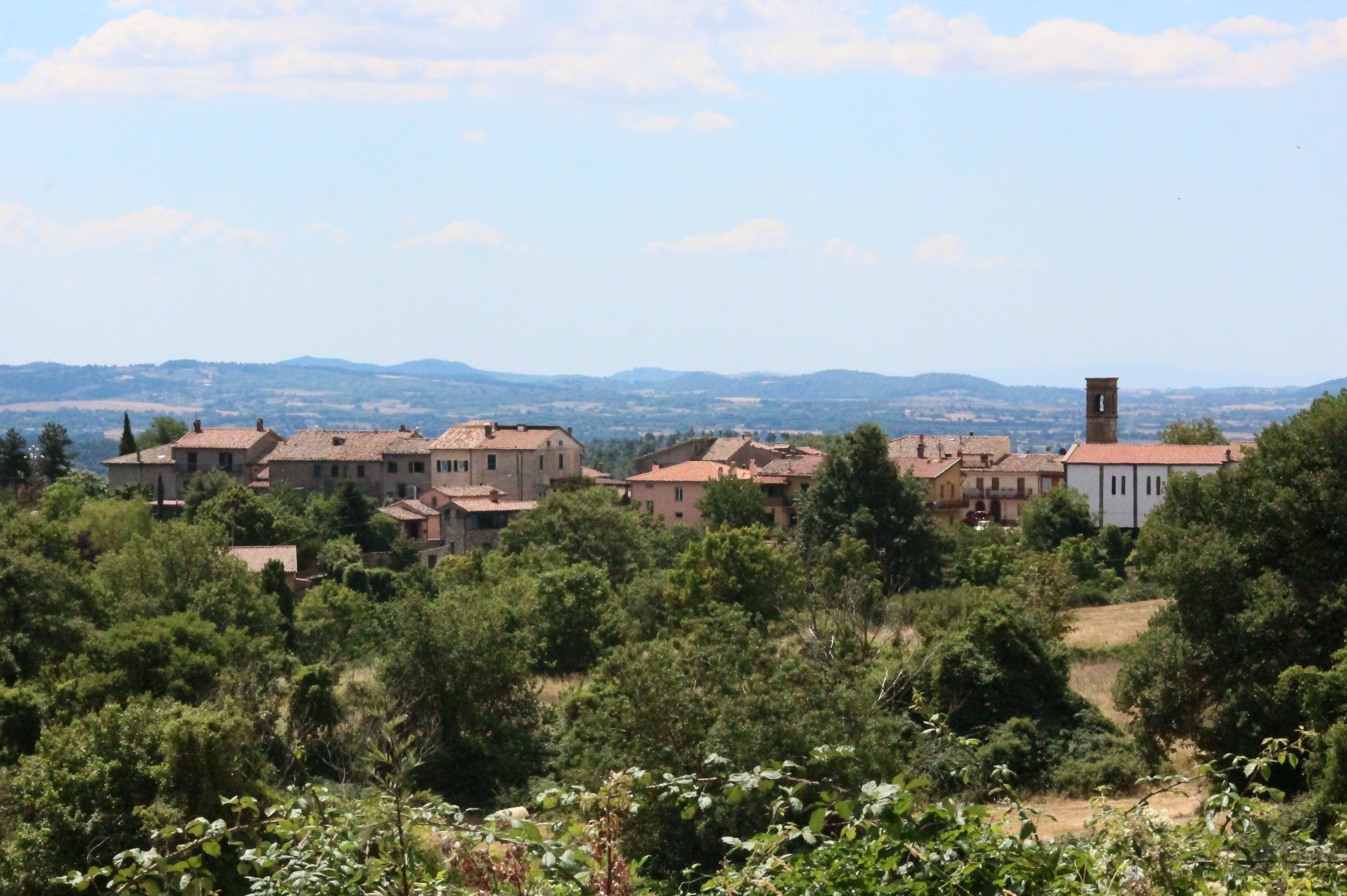
- View of Montevitozzo

- Location of Montevitozzo in Italy
- Coordinates: 42°44′44″N 11°42′26″E
- Country: Italy
- Region: Tuscany
- Province: Grosseto (GR)
- Comune: Sorano
- Elevation: 668 m (2,192 ft)

Population (2011)
  - Total: 114
- Demonym: Montevitozzesi
- Time zone: UTC+1 (CET)
  - Summer (DST): UTC+2 (CEST)
- Postal code: 58010
- Dialing code: (+39) 0564

Montevitozzo is a village in Tuscany, central Italy, administratively a frazione of the comune of Sorano, province of Grosseto, in the tuff area of southern Maremma. At the time of the 2001 census its population amounted to 106.

== Geography ==
Montevitozzo is about 80 km (50 mi) from Grosseto and 12 km (7 mi) from Sorano, and it is situated along the Provincial Road which links Sorano to Castell'Azzara.

The territory of Montevitozzo is composed also by the hamlets of Casa della Fonte, Casella, Cerretino, Le Capannelle, Le Porcarecce, Il Poggio, Marcelli and Ronzinami.

== History ==
The village was founded by the Aldobrandeschi in the 12th century and then conquered by Orvieto in 1284. It was then held by the Republic of Siena (15th century), by the Orsini from Pitigliano (16th century) and by the Medicis (17th century).

== Main sights ==
- San Giacomo (13th century), main parish church of the village, it was built in the late 14th century and then restructured many times.
- Immacolata Concezione (19th century)
- Chapel of Sant'Antonio Abate, small church in the hamlet of Marcelli.
- Villa Orsini (16th century), fortified villa built by the Orsini family during the Renaissance.
- Castle of Montevitozzo, commonly known as Roccaccia, it is the old castle of the village situated on the top of the Monte Vitozzo. It's now in ruins.

== Bibliography ==
- Aldo Mazzolai, Guida della Maremma. Percorsi tra arte e natura, Florence, Le Lettere, 1997.

== See also ==
- Castell'Ottieri
- Cerreto, Sorano
- Elmo, Sorano
- Montebuono, Sorano
- Montorio, Sorano
- San Giovanni delle Contee
- San Quirico, Sorano
- San Valentino, Sorano
- Sovana
