= Montorio, Sorano =

Montorio
- Frazione
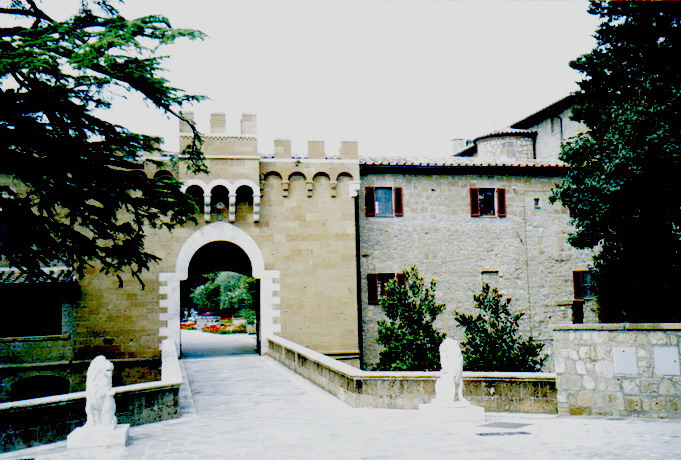
- The castle of Montorio

- Location of Montorio in Italy
- Coordinates: 42°44′30″N 11°46′1″E
- Country: Italy
- Region: Tuscany
- Province: Grosseto (GR)
- Comune: Sorano
- Elevation: 483 m (1,585 ft)
- Demonym: Montoriesi
- Time zone: UTC+1 (CET)
  - Summer (DST): UTC+2 (CEST)
- Postal code: 58010
- Dialing code: (+39) 0564

Montorio is a village in Tuscany, central Italy, administratively a frazione of the comune of Sorano, province of Grosseto, in the tuff area of southern Maremma.

== Geography ==
Montorio is about 90 km from Grosseto and 10 km from Sorano, and it is situated along the Provincial Road which links Sorano to Castell'Azzara.

== History ==
It was included — along with Castell'Ottieri, San Giovanni delle Contee and the castle of Sopano — in the small County of Ottieri in the Middle Ages. The county was abolished in 1616.

== Main sights ==
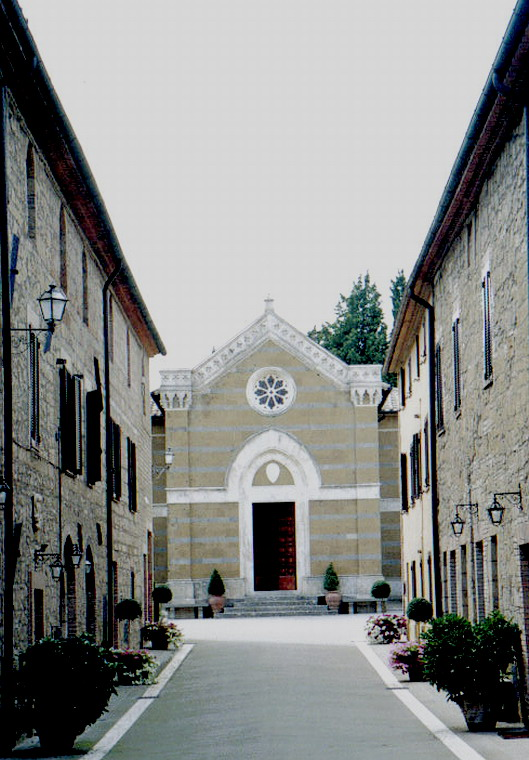
The church of Santa Maria

- Santa Maria (19th century), the main church of the village, it was built in the 19th century in the place of the ancient chapel of the castle. It is a typical Gothic Revival architecture.
- Castle of Montorio (12th century), built by the Aldobrandeschi in the Middle Ages, it was then restructured by the Ottieri and then transformed into a fortified farmhouse after the annexation of the county in the Grand Duchy of Tuscany.
- Walls of Montorio, old fortifications which surround the village since the 12th century.

== Bibliography ==
- Aldo Mazzolai, Guida della Maremma. Percorsi tra arte e natura, Florence, Le Lettere, 1997.

== See also ==
- Castell'Ottieri
- Cerreto, Sorano
- Elmo, Sorano
- Montebuono, Sorano
- Montevitozzo
- San Giovanni delle Contee
- San Quirico, Sorano
- San Valentino, Sorano
- Sovana
