= San Floriano Lake =

Lake in Tuscany, Italy

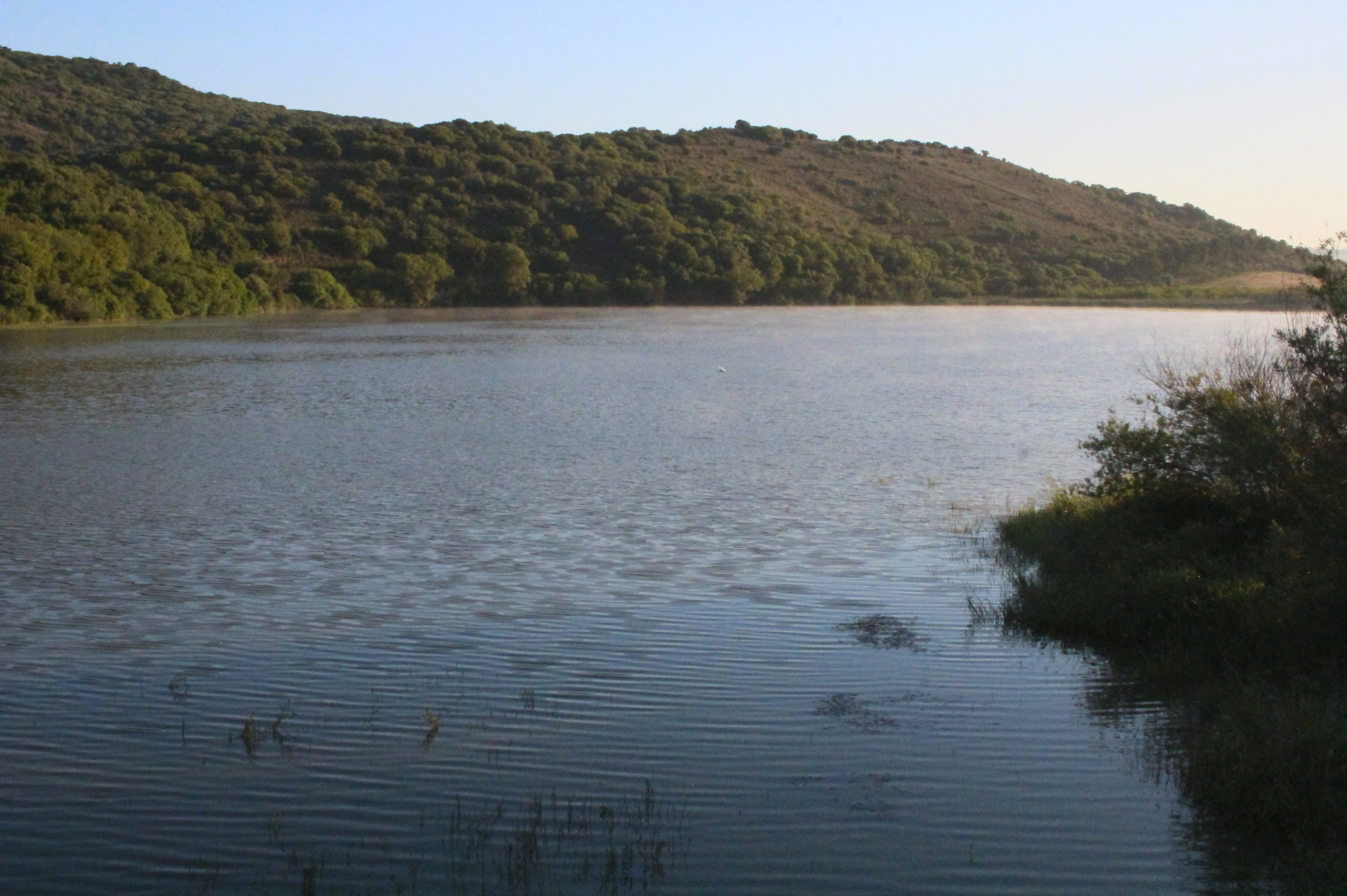

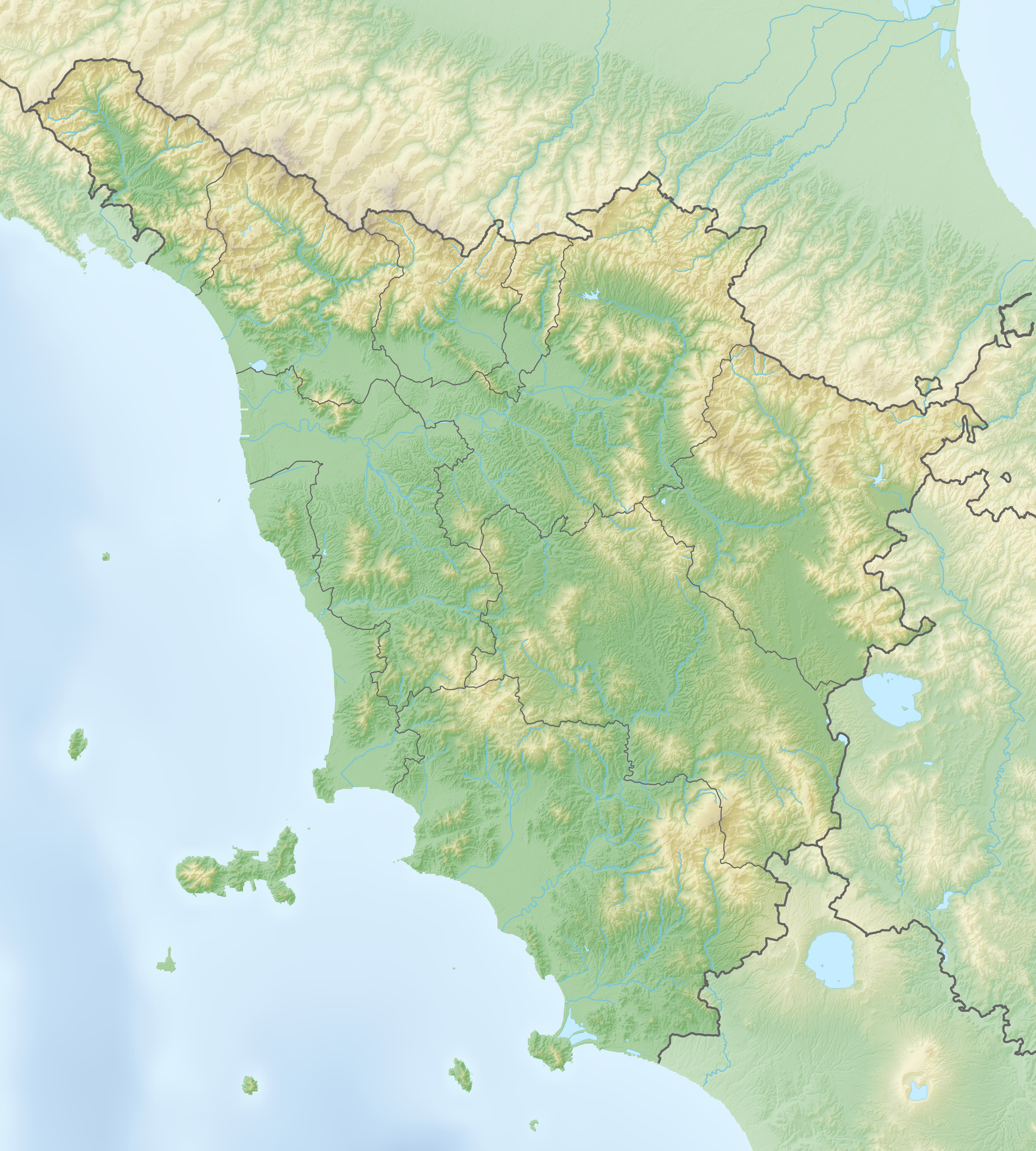
- Location within Tuscany
- Location: Province of Grosseto, Tuscany
- Coordinates: 42°25′32.76″N 11°21′42.45″E
- Basin countries: Italy
- Surface area: 0.3 km^{2} (0.12 sq mi)
- Surface elevation: 6 m (20 ft)

San Floriano Lake (Italian: Lago di San Floriano) is a lake in the Province of Grosseto, Tuscany.

Along with Acquato Lake, San Floriano is an example of a karst lake.

The lake's surface area is 0.3 km² and it sits at 6m above sea level.
