= Elmo, Sorano =

Elmo
- Frazione
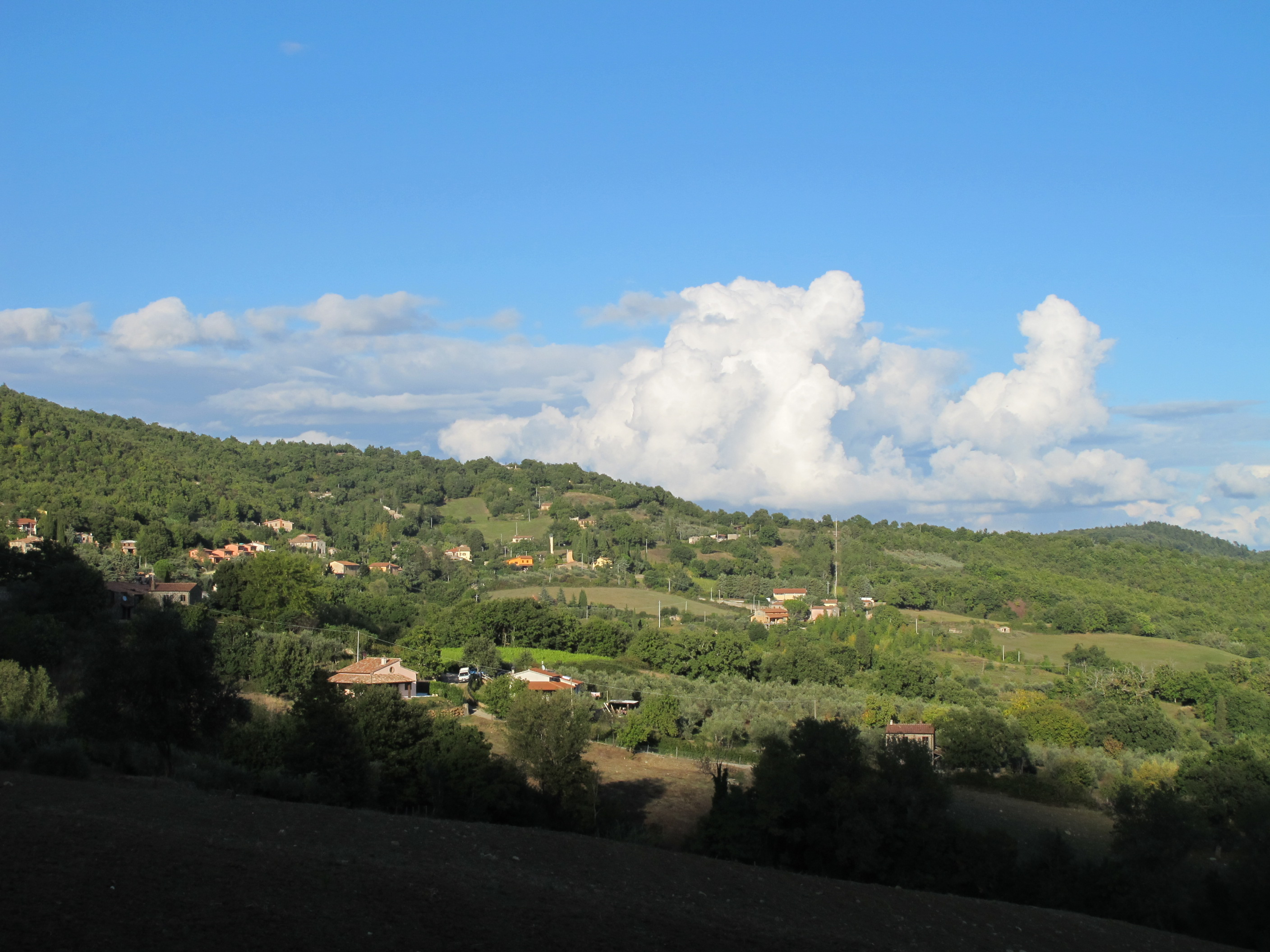
- View from Elmo

- Location of Elmo in Italy
- Coordinates: 42°42′28″N 11°41′55″E
- Country: Italy
- Region: Tuscany
- Province: Grosseto (GR)
- Comune: Sorano
- Elevation: 510 m (1,670 ft)

Population (2011)
  - Total: 39
- Demonym: Elmesi
- Time zone: UTC+1 (CET)
  - Summer (DST): UTC+2 (CEST)
- Postal code: 58010
- Dialing code: (+39) 0564

Elmo is a village in Tuscany, central Italy, administratively a frazione of the comune of Sorano, province of Grosseto, in the tuff area of southern Maremma. At the time of the 2001 census its population amounted to 44.

Elmo is about 90 km from Grosseto and 6 km from Sorano, and it is situated along the Provincial Road which links Sorano to Selvena. The village is situated at the foot of the Monte Elmo, one of the southern slopes of Monte Amiata.

== Main sights ==
- San Giovanni Decollato, modern parish church of the village, it was built in the 20th century next to the primitive church dating back to the 16th century.
- Abbey of Montecalvello, built in the Early Middle Ages, it hosted the Benedictine monks and gave shelter to pope Gregory VII in the 11th century. The building is now in ruins.

== Bibliography ==
- Carlo Citter, Guida agli edifici sacri della Maremma, Siena, Nuova Immagine Editrice, 2002.

== See also ==
- Castell'Ottieri
- Cerreto, Sorano
- Montebuono, Sorano
- Montevitozzo
- Montorio, Sorano
- San Giovanni delle Contee
- San Quirico, Sorano
- San Valentino, Sorano
- Sovana
