= Montebuono, Sorano =

Montebuono
- Frazione
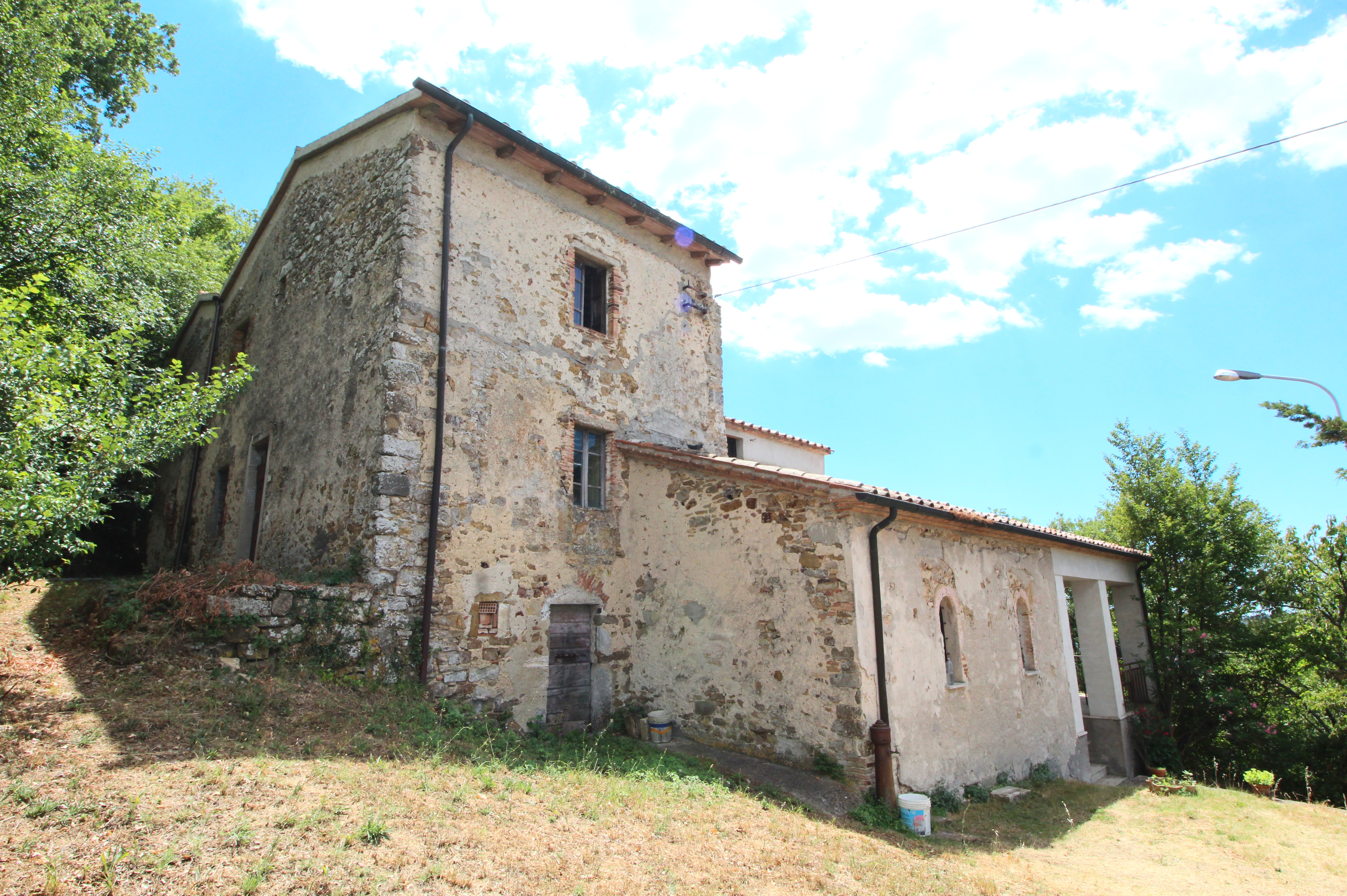
- The church of Sant'Andrea and the ancient walls

- Location of Montebuono in Italy
- Coordinates: 42°42′21″N 11°38′47″E
- Country: Italy
- Region: Tuscany
- Province: Grosseto (GR)
- Comune: Sorano
- Elevation: 519 m (1,703 ft)

Population (2011)
  - Total: 28
- Demonym: Montebonesi
- Time zone: UTC+1 (CET)
  - Summer (DST): UTC+2 (CEST)
- Postal code: 58010
- Dialing code: (+39) 0564

Montebuono is a village in Tuscany, central Italy, administratively a frazione of the comune of Sorano, province of Grosseto, in the tuff area of southern Maremma. At the time of the 2001 census its population amounted to 37.

Montebuono is about 75 km from Grosseto and 12 km from Sorano, and it is situated along the Provincial Road which links Castell'Azzara and Elmo to Sovana. The village was known as Tucciano in the Middle Ages. It is composed by two hamlets: Appalto and Dispensa.

== Main sights ==
- Sant'Andrea (13th century), main parish church of the village, it was built in the 13th century and later restructured many times. It contains some late-Renaissance paintings.
- Madonna del Cerro (17th century), church in the hamlet of Dispensa, it was built in 1686. It was restored in 1982.
- Castle of Montebuono, old castle of the village, it's now in ruins.

== Bibliography ==
- Aldo Mazzolai, Guida della Maremma. Percorsi tra arte e natura, Florence, Le Lettere, 1997.

== See also ==
- Castell'Ottieri
- Cerreto, Sorano
- Elmo, Sorano
- Montevitozzo
- Montorio, Sorano
- San Giovanni delle Contee
- San Quirico, Sorano
- San Valentino, Sorano
- Sovana
