= San Giovanni delle Contee =

- Frazione
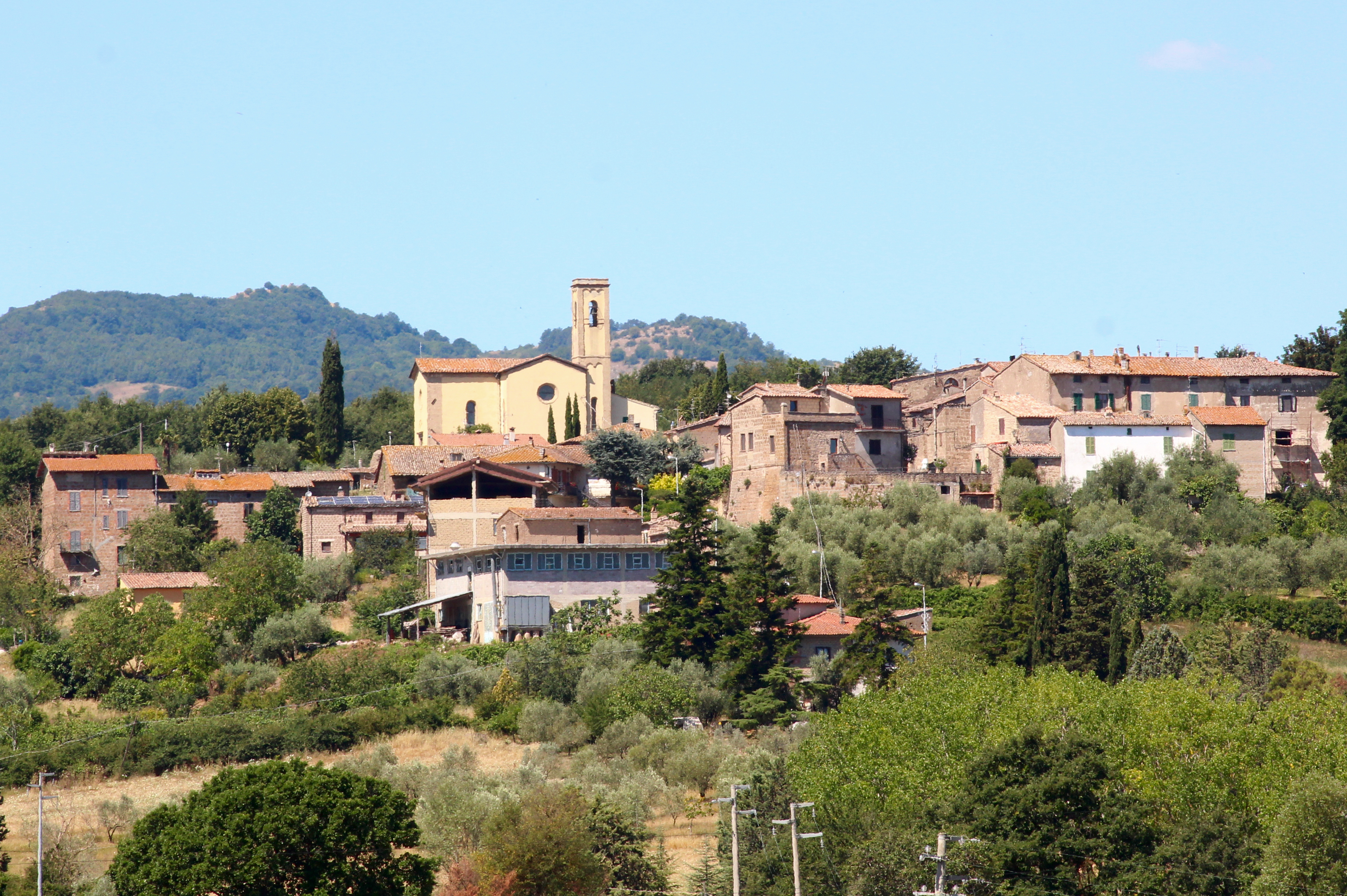
- View of San Giovanni delle Contee

- Location of San Giovanni delle Contee in Italy
- Coordinates: 42°45′13″N 11°45′50″E
- Country: Italy
- Region: Tuscany
- Province: Grosseto (GR)
- Comune: Sorano
- Elevation: 470 m (1,540 ft)

Population (2011)
  - Total: 192
- Demonym: Sangiovannesi
- Time zone: UTC+1 (CET)
  - Summer (DST): UTC+2 (CEST)
- Postal code: 58010
- Dialing code: (+39) 0564

San Giovanni delle Contee is a village in Tuscany, central Italy, administratively a frazione of the comune of Sorano, province of Grosseto, in the tuff area of southern Maremma. At the time of the 2001 census its population amounted to 224.

San Giovanni delle Contee is about 90 km from Grosseto and 12 km from Sorano, and it is situated along the Provincial Road which links Sorano to Castell'Azzara.

== History ==
It was included — alongside Castell'Ottieri, Montorio and the castle of Sopano — in the small County of Ottieri in the Middle Ages. The county was abolished in 1616.

== Main sights ==
- Santa Caterina delle Ruote (17th century), main church of the village, it was built as a pieve (pieve di San Giovanni) in the Middle Ages and entirely re-built in the 17th century.
- Casa Reale, one of the oldest buildings in the village, it was the seat of the Ottieris in San Giovanni delle Contee.

== Bibliography ==
- (in Italian) Emanuele Repetti, «San Giovanni delle Contee », Dizionario Geografico Fisico Storico della Toscana, 1833–1846.
- Aldo Mazzolai, Guida della Maremma. Percorsi tra arte e natura, Florence, Le Lettere, 1997.

== See also ==
- Castell'Ottieri
- Cerreto, Sorano
- Elmo, Sorano
- Montebuono, Sorano
- Montevitozzo
- Montorio, Sorano
- San Quirico, Sorano
- San Valentino, Sorano
- Sovana
