= San Quirico, Sorano =

San Quirico
- Frazione
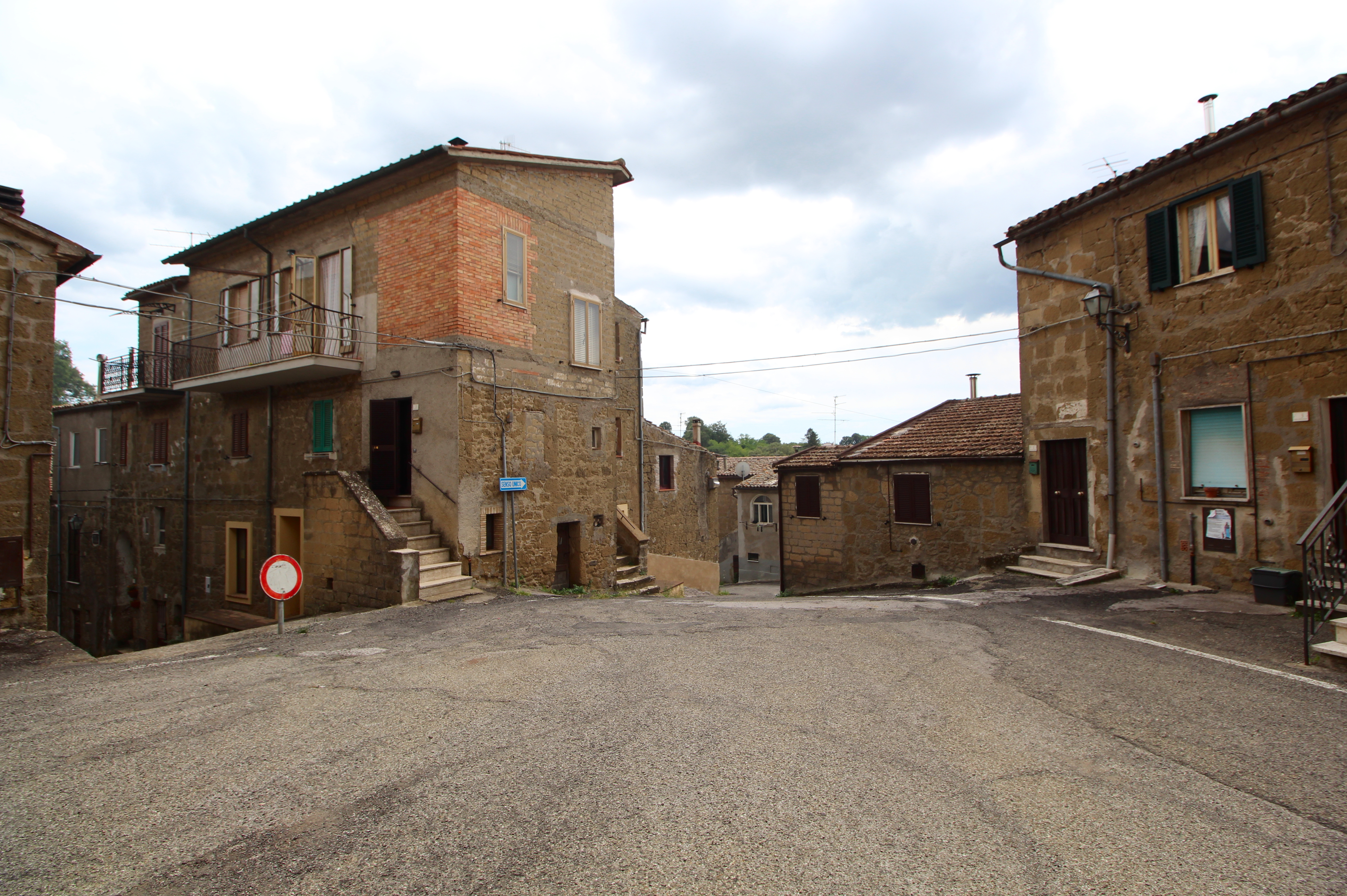

- Location of San Quirico in Italy
- Coordinates: 42°40′9″N 11°45′47″E
- Country: Italy
- Region: Tuscany
- Province: Grosseto (GR)
- Comune: Sorano
- Elevation: 486 m (1,594 ft)

Population (2011)
  - Total: 476
- Demonym: Sanquirichesi
- Time zone: UTC+1 (CET)
  - Summer (DST): UTC+2 (CEST)
- Postal code: 58010
- Dialing code: (+39) 0564

San Quirico is a village in Tuscany, central Italy, administratively a frazione of the comune of Sorano, province of Grosseto, in the tuff area of southern Maremma. At the time of the 2001 census its population amounted to 572.

San Quirico is about 85 km from Grosseto and 5 km from Sorano, and it is situated along the Provincial Road which links Sorano to Casone. The village was born after the depopulation of the town of Vitozza, whose ruins lie next to San Quirico. It was formerly known as San Quirichino.

== Main sights ==
- Santi Quirico e Giulitta (18th century), main parish church of the village since 1785, it was restructured in a Neo-Classical style in the early 20th century.
- Chapel of Montignano (19th century), little chapel in the hamlet of Montignano, it was built in 1845.
- Archaeological site of Vitozza

== Bibliography ==
- (in Italian) Emanuele Repetti, «San Quirico », Dizionario Geografico Fisico Storico della Toscana, 1833–1846.
- Carlo Citter, Guida agli edifici sacri della Maremma, Siena, Nuova Immagine Editrice, 2002.

== See also ==
- Castell'Ottieri
- Cerreto, Sorano
- Elmo, Sorano
- Montebuono, Sorano
- Montevitozzo
- Montorio, Sorano
- San Giovanni delle Contee
- San Valentino, Sorano
- Sovana
