= San Valentino, Sorano =

San Valentino
- Frazione
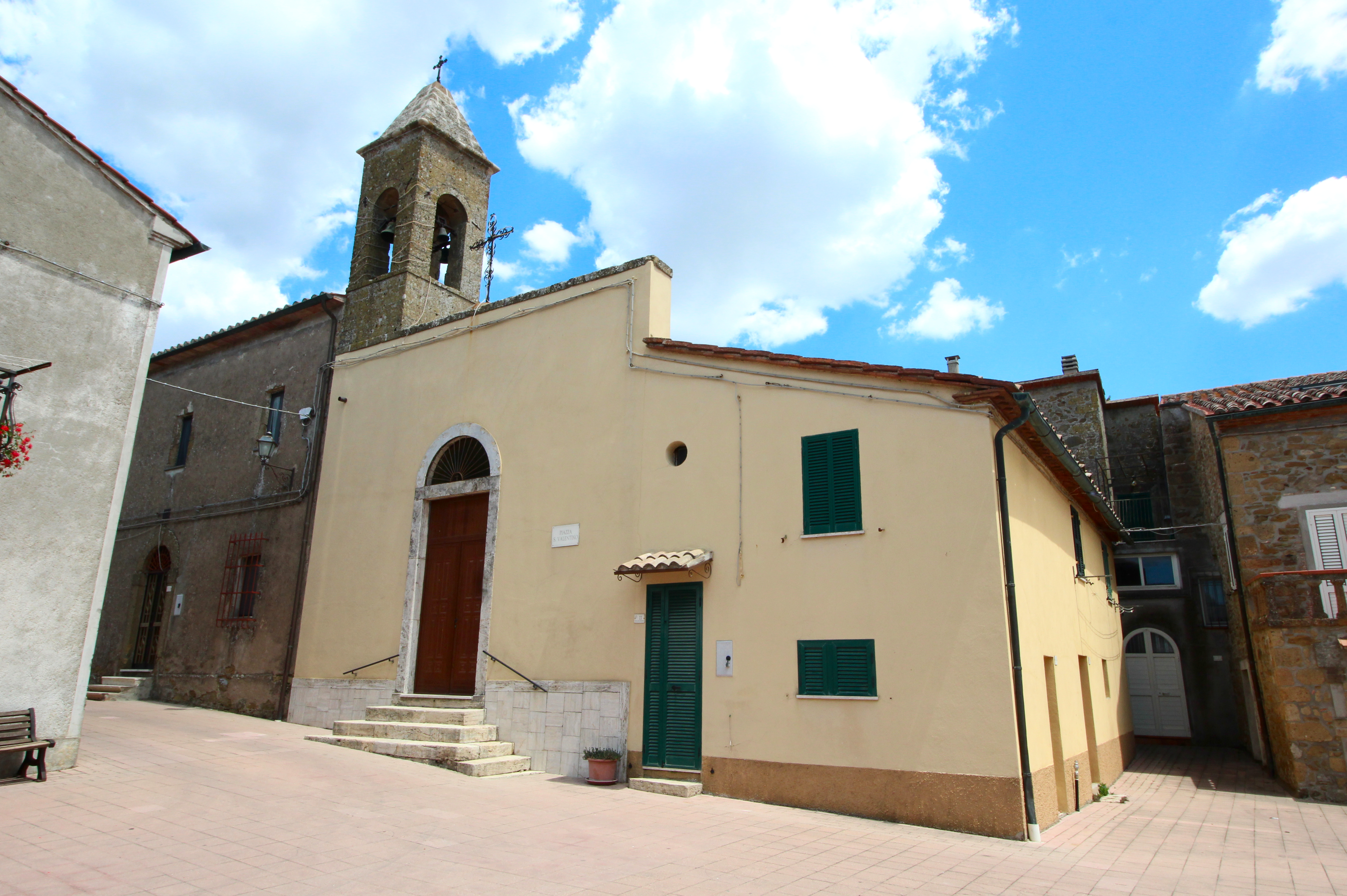
- The church of San Valentino

- Location of San Valentino in Italy
- Coordinates: 42°42′13″N 11°44′16″E
- Country: Italy
- Region: Tuscany
- Province: Grosseto (GR)
- Comune: Sorano
- Elevation: 530 m (1,740 ft)

Population (2011)
  - Total: 52
- Demonym: Sanvalentinesi
- Time zone: UTC+1 (CET)
  - Summer (DST): UTC+2 (CEST)
- Postal code: 58010
- Dialing code: (+39) 0564

San Valentino is a village in Tuscany, central Italy, administratively a frazione of the comune of Sorano, province of Grosseto, in the tuff area of southern Maremma. At the time of the 2001 census, its population was 58.

San Valentino is about 90 kilometres (56 miles) from Grosseto and 9 kilometres (5.6 miles) from Sorano. The village depended on the castle of Fregiano in the Middle Ages. The territory of San Valentino includes the hamlets of Casetta, Case Rocchi, Pratolungo, Valle Castagneta and is known for the presence of Etruscan ruins dating from the 3rd century BC.

== Main sights ==
- San Valentino (15th century), the main parish church of the village. It was originally built as a chapel and then restructured in the early 20th century.
- Chapel of Santissima Trinità (18th century), a little chapel in the hamlet of Pratolungo.
- Fregiano Castle (14th century), now in ruins.

== Bibliography ==
- (in Italian) Emanuele Repetti, «San Valentino », Dizionario Geografico Fisico Storico della Toscana, 1833–1846.
- Carlo Citter, Guida agli edifici sacri della Maremma, Siena, Nuova Immagine Editrice, 2002.

== See also ==
- Castell'Ottieri
- Cerreto, Sorano
- Elmo, Sorano
- Montebuono, Sorano
- Montevitozzo
- Montorio, Sorano
- San Giovanni delle Contee
- San Quirico, Sorano
- Sovana
