= Sorano =

- Comune
- Comune di Sorano
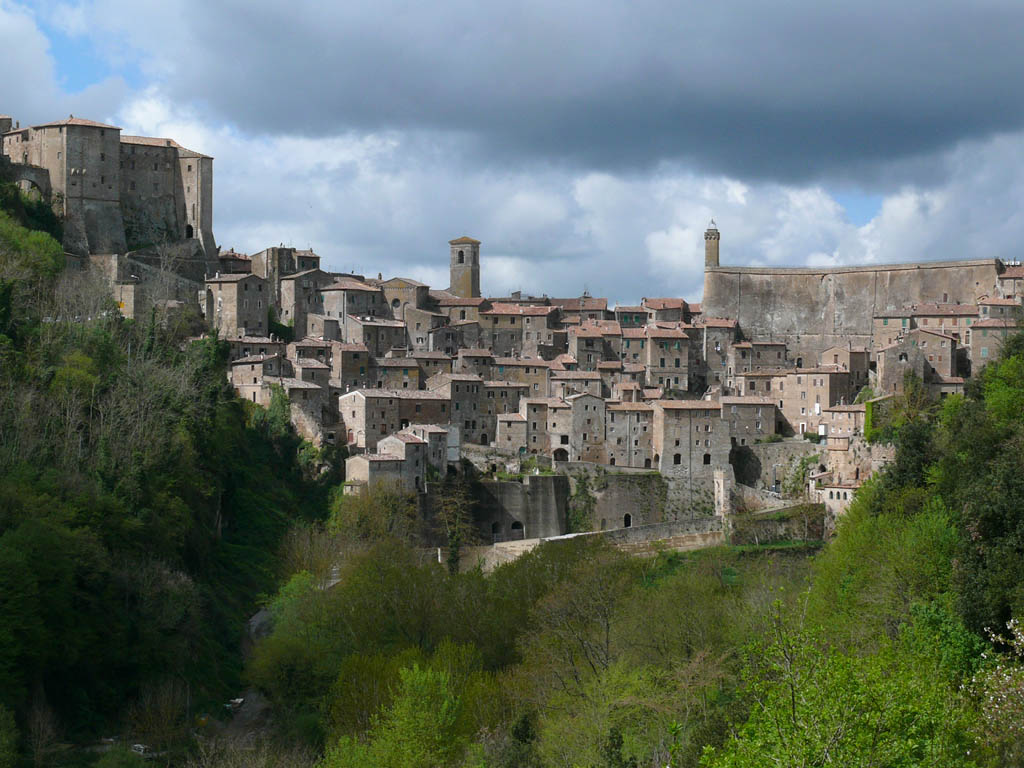

- Coat of arms

- Location within Italy Location within Tuscany
- Coordinates: 42°40′55″N 11°42′54″E
- Country: Italy
- Region: Tuscany
- Province: Grosseto (GR)
- Frazioni: Castell'Ottieri, Cerreto, Elmo, Montebuono, Montevitozzo, Montorio, San Giovanni delle Contee, San Quirico, San Valentino, Sovana

Government
  - Mayor: Pierandrea Vanni

Area
  - Total: 174.56 km^{2} (67.40 sq mi)
- Elevation: 379 m (1,243 ft)

Population (1 January 2022)
  - Total: 3,091
  - Density: 17.71/km^{2} (45.86/sq mi)
- Demonym: Soranesi
- Time zone: UTC+1 (CET)
  - Summer (DST): UTC+2 (CEST)
- Postal code: 58043
- Patron saint: St. Nicholas
- Saint day: December 6
- Website: Official website

Sorano is a town and comune in the province of Grosseto, in southern Tuscany, Italy. It is an ancient medieval hill town perched on a tuff outcrop overlooking the Lente River.

== History ==
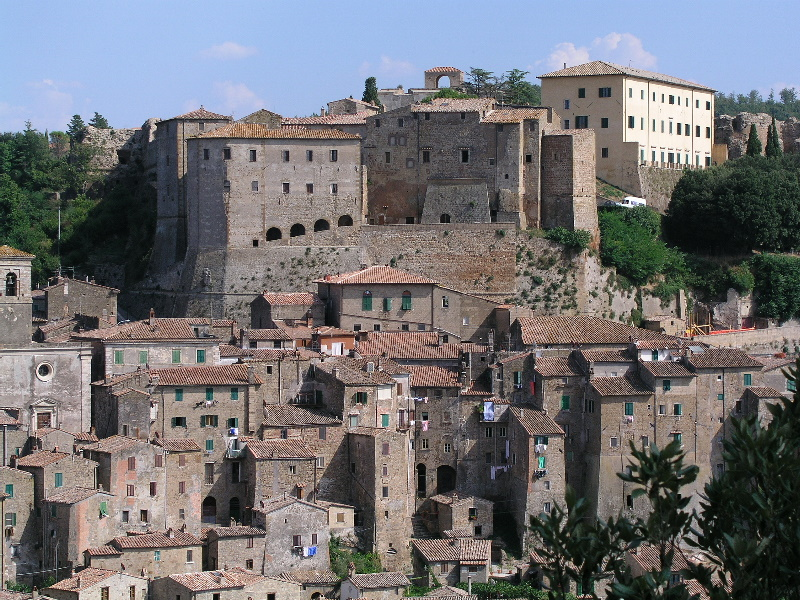
A view of Sorano

Sorano was probably inhabited by the Villanovan culture, but the first historical records date to the 3rd century BC, when it was an Etruscan city under the influence of the nearby and more populous Sovana.

Little is known about its history during the Roman period, but Sorano reappears in historical records in 862, when a county was founded by Emperor Louis II under the suzerainty of the Aldobrandeschi family. The Aldobrandeschi were among the most powerful feudal lords in southern Tuscany for more than four centuries, until 1312, when Margherita, daughter of Ildibrandino, died without male heirs. Her daughter Adelaide married Romano di Gentile of the Orsini family, who incorporated Sorano into the Orsini domains.

The County of Pitigliano and Sorano fought against the Republic of Siena, but was forced to accept its suzerainty from 1417. It regained full independence in 1556, after Siena was annexed to the Duchy of Tuscany. Due to its strategic position, the fortress was frequently attacked, and it also became the scene of fratricidal conflicts within the Orsini family. In 1604, following the death of Alessandro di Bertoldo, Sorano became part of the Grand Duchy of Tuscany.

It was incorporated into the Kingdom of Italy in 1860.

== Frazioni ==
The municipality is formed by the municipal seat of Sorano and the villages (frazioni) of Castell'Ottieri, Cerreto, Elmo, Montebuono, Montevitozzo, Montorio, San Giovanni delle Contee, San Quirico, San Valentino and Sovana.

== Culture ==
Comedian Jack Benny mentions Sorano in a running gag on both the radio and television versions of The Jack Benny Program, in which Jack has written a song entitled “When You Say 'I Beg Your Pardon,' Then I’ll Come Back to You.” In the gag, each time Jack reaches the lyric “when the swallows at Sorano return to Capistrano,” the song is interrupted by a cast member or guest star questioning how a swallow could possibly fly all the way from Italy to California.

== Main sights ==
- Rocca degli Orsini (Orsini Castle), originally built in the 14th century but completely renovated by Niccolò IV Orsini in 1552. It is considered one of the most important examples of Renaissance military architecture. The structure features two massive angular bastions connected by a curtain wall with a main gate, which is topped with a notable coat of arms and a square tower. Inside the walls are remains of the original core, including a round tower and the former drawbridge, now lost. A cycle of 16th-century frescoes from the Sienese school was recently discovered.
- Masso Leopoldino, a natural tuff outcrop carved into a fortified panoramic terrace by order of Grand Duke Leopold II.
- Vitozza, a cave settlement and fortress.

Another castle is in the frazione of Sovana.

== See also ==
- Pitigliano
- Sovana
