= Cerreto, Sorano =

Cerreto
- Frazione
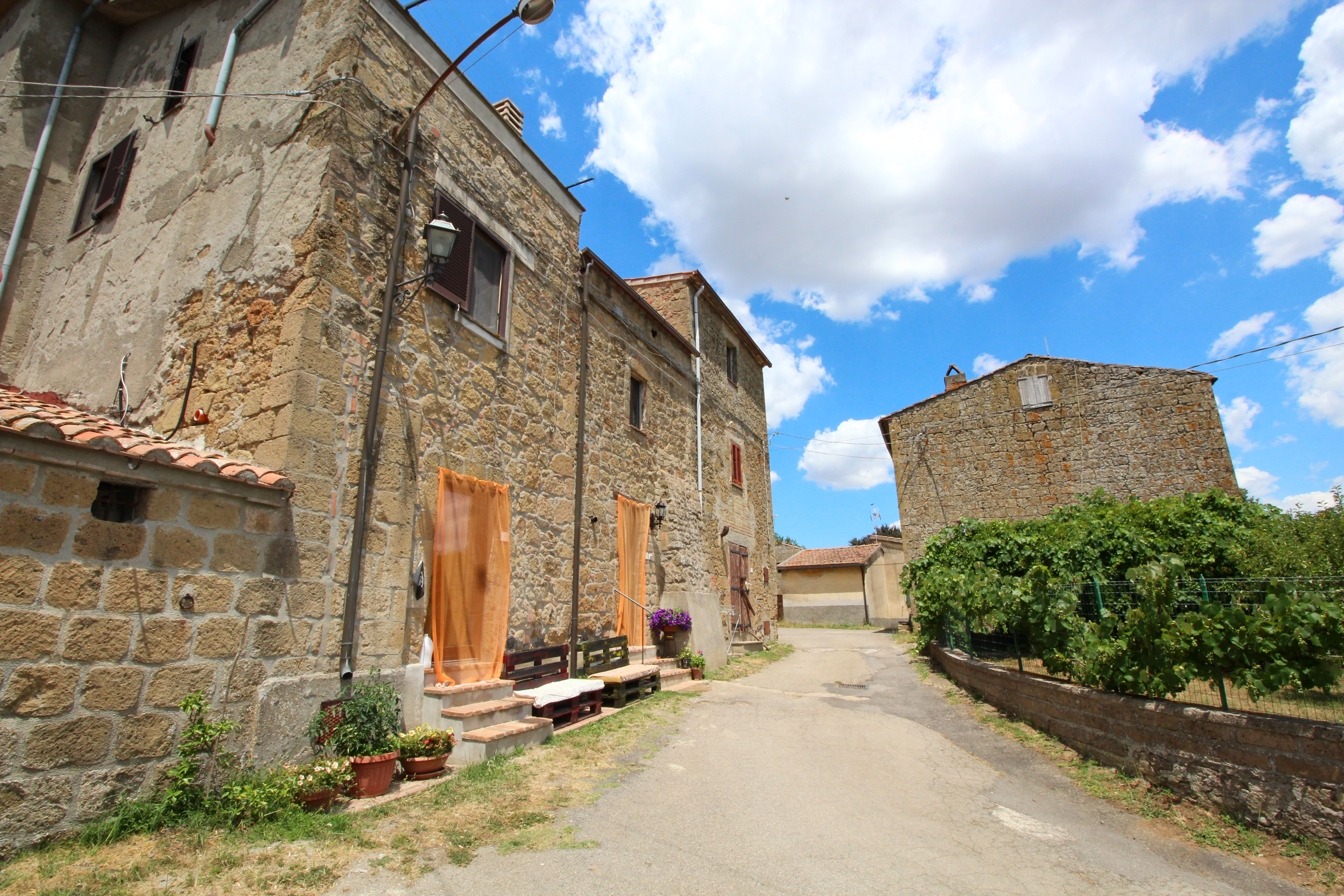
- The village

- Location of Cerreto in Italy
- Coordinates: 42°40′51″N 11°44′25″E
- Country: Italy
- Region: Tuscany
- Province: Grosseto (GR)
- Comune: Sorano
- Elevation: 467 m (1,532 ft)

Population (2011)
  - Total: 16
- Demonym: Cerretani
- Time zone: UTC+1 (CET)
  - Summer (DST): UTC+2 (CEST)
- Postal code: 58010
- Dialing code: (+39) 0564

Cerreto is a village in Tuscany, central Italy, administratively a frazione of the comune of Sorano, province of Grosseto, in the tuff area of southern Maremma. At the time of the 2001 census its population amounted to 19.

Cerreto is about 90 km from Grosseto and 4 km from Sorano, and it is situated along the Provincial Road which links Sorano to San Quirico. The village is known for the Marian apparition that occurred to the young shepherdess Veronica Nucci in 1853. The sanctuary of Madonna Addolorata was built in 1846 as a place of pilgrimage.

Cerreto is also known for its typical caciotta cheese, the pastorella ("shepherdess") of Cerreto.

== Main sights ==
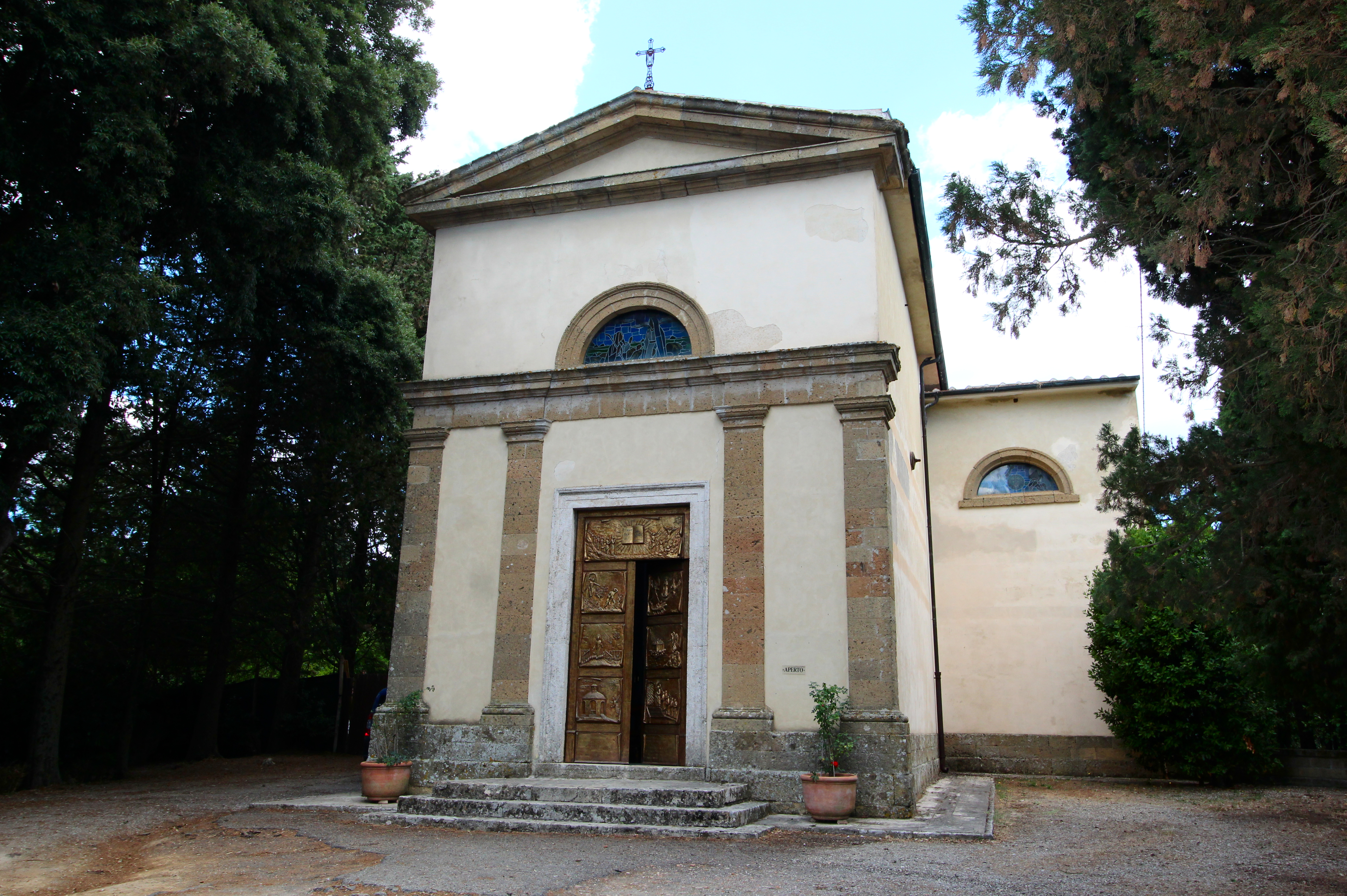
The Sanctuary of Madonna Addolorata

- Sanctuary of Madonna Addolorata, built in 1846 in the place of the apparition of the Virgin Mary to the 12 years old shepherdess Veronica Nucci, it hosts now the Carmelite cloistered nuns.
- Sant'Anna (13th century), former church now converted into a barn, you can still recognize the original walls and arches of the primitive structure.

== Bibliography ==
- Alfredo Scanzani, La Signora del Cerreto. La straordinaria apparizione a una pastorella della Maremma, Florence, Mosaico Edizioni, 1998.

== See also ==
- Castell'Ottieri
- Elmo, Sorano
- Montebuono, Sorano
- Montevitozzo
- Montorio, Sorano
- San Giovanni delle Contee
- San Quirico, Sorano
- San Valentino, Sorano
- Sovana
