= Sovana =

- Frazione
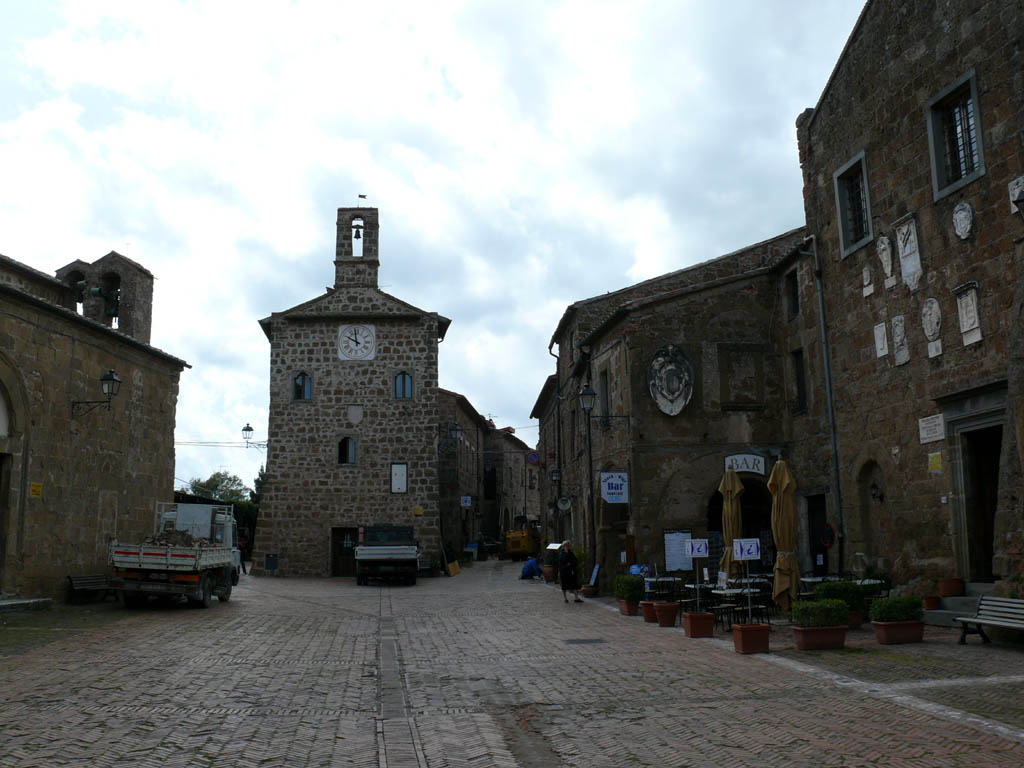
- The main square in Sovana

- Location of Sovana in Italy
- Coordinates: 42°39′25″N 11°38′40″E
- Country: Italy
- Region: Tuscany
- Province: Grosseto (GR)
- Comune: Sorano
- Elevation: 291 m (955 ft)

Population (2011)
  - Total: 122
- Demonym(s): Sovanesi, Soanesi
- Time zone: UTC+1 (CET)
  - Summer (DST): UTC+2 (CEST)
- Postal code: 58010
- Dialing code: (+39) 0564

Sovana is a small town in southern Tuscany, Italy, a frazione of Sorano, a comune in the province of Grosseto. It is one of I Borghi più belli d'Italia ("The most beautiful villages of Italy").

== History ==
Etruscan by origin, Sovana became a Roman municipium, and, from the 5th century, an episcopal see. Conquered by Lombards in 592–605, it was chosen as their administrative center in the area. Later, when Roselle was abandoned due to Saracen ravages, it became the centre of the county under the Aldobrandeschi family. In the Middle Ages it was known as Soana.

Its importance declined when the county was acquired by the Orsini, who moved the capital to Pitigliano. In the mid-16th century Sovana was annexed to the Grand Duchy of Tuscany by Cosimo I de' Medici.

== Main sights ==
- Rocca Aldobrandesca (Aldobrandeschi Castle), probably built over a pre-existing Etruscan/Roman fortress. The current appearance dates from its 1572 renovation, when the bastions were added. Dismantled in the 17th century, today only the portal, a tower and a stretch of walls remain.
- Palazzo Pretorio (13th-15th centuries).
- The Romanesque church of Santa Maria Maggiore (12th-13th church). It houses one of the most ancient pre-Romanesque ciboria (the plural of "ciborium").
- Sovana cathedral: built in the 11th-12th centuries over a most ancient 8th century edifice, also in Romanesque style, has a nave and two aisles with columns carrying interesting decorations with biblical scenes. Of the 8th century the crypt and the richly decorated portal remain. Also curious is the relief of a two-tailed siren, next to the latter, which has similarity with one of the carved Etruscan tombs recently discovered in the area. Among others, Bishop of Sovana was Antonio Vegni, born in 1686. After a long period in Rome, he was bishop of Sovana and Pitigliano from 1739 to 1746.
- Loggetta del Capitano
- The late Renaissance Palazzo Bourbon del Monte, built by Cosimo I de' Medici.
- The Church of San Mamiliano, may be the most ancient of the village. In recent years, during archaeological investigations, there has been found a treasure of near 500 golden coins of the 5th century AD.
- The Etruscan Necropolis, Archaeological Area of Sovana

== People ==
Pope Gregory VII (Ildebrando di Soana) was born here.

== Bibliography ==
- Bruni, Franco (November 2006). "La Maremma delle meraviglie". Medioevo (118): 60–62.

== See also ==
- Castell'Ottieri
- Cerreto, Sorano
- Elmo, Sorano
- Montebuono, Sorano
- Montevitozzo
- Montorio, Sorano
- San Giovanni delle Contee
- San Quirico, Sorano
- San Valentino, Sorano
