= Vegni =

Vegni coat of arms.

The Vegni are an Italian family from Siena. The medieval origins of the family have limited documentation. The origin of the family is in Siena, with Bencivenne, father of Aringhieri, whose children Guido, Iacobina and Ranieri are mentioned in a contract of a house sale in 1201. The son of Guido, Bencivenni, is the first one to have a recognised profession mentioned in the documents. A notary of the royal chamber, called Bencivennis olim Guidi, was active in Siena in the first part of the 13th century. The patronymic Bencivennis (the Latin genitive) is used, abbreviated as bcVennis in the documents signed by Luca, a notary, in documents he drew up during late 13th. Pietro olim (of) Luca bcVennis was active in Siena until 1321. The sons of Pietro settled in the area of Chianciano, focusing the centre of interests of the family in the South of the Siena Republic until the fall of it in 1555. The surname Bencivennis remains in official documents during all the Republican period, to disappear at the end of the 16th century, substituted by Vegni. The last one to use it in official documents is Eustachio Bencivennis or bcVegnis, again a notary, who died in 1585. His grandson Giovanni Battista di Pietro, a notary in Chianciano between 1600 and 1641, signs his documents as Vegni, although he still uses the same private legal seal with the family coat of arms.

Besides the local government positions held by family members, the only member worth of notice in these early period is Andrea, bishop of Chiusi in the mid-16th century. Biagio, Giovanni Andrea and Giovanni Battista and Ventura consolidated the family presence in Chianciano during the 17th. At the turn of the 18th century three main branches of the family are known, second cousins, one in Chianciano, headed by Francesco, of Deo' (Adeodato of Ventura), a lawyer and then local judge. Pietro, a landowner in Montisi, son of Giovanni Andrea, with his three sons, Giacomo, Giuseppe and Luca, and a daughter, Laura. Luca became a priest, with Giuseppe and Giacomo dividing, but only in 1745, the properties of the father Pietro, who died in 1728. At that time, the third branch of the family, that of Montegiovi, near Pienza and Castel del Piano, was headed by Carlo Giuseppe of Ventura.

During the first half of the 18th century the family still maintains its centre of interests in the region South of Siena, which remains the city of reference for education, with its university, and local political power. A member of international relevance is Leonardo, born from Francesco Vegni and Caterina Apolloni in 1731.

Leonardo Vegni.

Leonardo, who was pleased to add a "de" to the surname Vegni in order to stress his ancient nobility, graduated with a degree in civil and canon law from the University of Siena in 1750, but he was also very much interested in design, architecture, poetry (he was a member of the Roman academy Arcadia) and science. He invented a new technique for the creation of bas-reliefs: Tartar modelling [La plastica dei tartari], which exploited the cementing properties of the calcareous waters of the Baths of San Filippo. Leonardo opened a factory for the production of bas-reliefs, which the Grand Duke Peter Leopold visited in 1769. He was much esteemed by his contemporaries, not least for his creation of the theatre of Montalcino, the gate at Sole di Chianciano, the Albergotti palace in Arezzo. He also published a series of critical works on architecture. He died in 1801, in Rome. His adopted child, Luigi, continued his works with less success during the first half of the 19th century, and he had no children. The entire collection of engravings and Leonardo's library went lost. Leonardo de Vegni prints of Italian arts and landscapes are a rarity for today's antique lovers, and his legacy in architecture is only recently being rediscovered by experts.

A first noticeable physician of the family was Ignazio Vegni, son of Giacomo, who studied medicine in Siena, and after a few years at the university was called as court physician to the Grand Ducal Court in Florence in the second half of the 18th century.

Religion is once again at centre stage with the family branch of Montegiovi, near Pienza: Antonio, born in 1686, after a long period in Rome, was bishop of Sovana and Pitigliano from 1739 to 1746. His nephew, Andrea Domenico, also born in Montegiovi in 1711, was Bishop of Montalcino from 1767 to his death, in November 1773.

Another member of the family dedicated his life to the people, but in a slightly different way. Andrea was born in Montisi in 1751 from Giuseppe of Pietro. After qualifying in civil and canon law from the University of Siena, he started his career as a judge, in 1772, in Siena. He lived exceptional times for his profession, with the Peter Leopold penal code reform, which, among other important advances, abolished the death penalty in Tuscany, first country in the world, well before the others. In 1777 he is at the Court of Justice in Radicofani, then from 1783 he works in Asinalunga, as head of cabinet of the Imperial Royal Vicar (head of the governmental authority in the area – a sort of a Prefect) Siminetti, later the Ministry of Justice in Florence. In 1792, under the rule of the new Grand-Duke, Ferdinand III, Andrea was finally Royal Vicar in Pienza, responsible for the peaceful living of citizens in the area from Val di Chiana to the hills towards the Amiata, in the South Tuscany. His frequent travels obliged him to move the family (he married with Josepha Filugelli) to Asciano, midway between Siena and Pienza, where his brothers and cousins lived. His brother, Girolamo, was Canonico(prior) of the Collegiata of Asciano. Andrea's son, Giuseppe Antonio Maria, born in 1785, was educated by his uncle in Asciano, and then sent to Siena to study medicine.

Giuseppe Antonio Maria Vegni in 1855.

Siena, in the first years of the 19th century, was under the rule of Napoleon, and the region was called Ombrone. Giuseppe graduated in 1813, at the time of his marriage with Maria Carolina Neri (1792–1836). She was a beautiful, well-educated and wealthy woman, living close to the old hospital (Ospedale Santa Maria della Scala) where he was intern. Giuseppe, after a brief period of activity as a physician, dedicated his life to the family and to Siena's cultural and social life (he was a member of the Accademia dei Rozzi). He had three children, Adelaide (1816–1883), Girolamo (1826–1857) and Giovanni (1830–1907).

They moved to the building which was part of her dowry, in via Franciosa, just at the end of the splendid square of the baptistry, Piazza S. Giovanni. On the opposite side of the square lived Andrea's second cousin Niccola(1783–1864), a lawyer son of Eustachio of Giacomo, who lived at the corner with via dei Pellegrini, in the Palazzo del Magnifico. With the acquisition of these two houses in Siena, the family's centre of interests had finally moved to Siena, with both the surviving branches of the family maintaining only land ownership links to the val di Chiana and Asciano. The two branches were identified by slightly different coats of arms. Girolamo, son of Giuseppe, a judge, dies at 34 in 1857, his wife and son leaving to Brasil in the 1870s. With the death of Niccola in 1864 and the lack of offspring from the cousins in Asciano, only Angelo (son of Niccola, born in 1811) and Giovanni remains. They grew up in the same square, but the characters of the two were certainly very different, with Giovanni staying all his life in Siena, marrying the daughter of an industrialist, dedicating the rest of his life to the family and his own pleasure; Angelo, travelled the world, became a professor of engineering and an industrialist himself, finally, having no children, he left all his vast fortune to the "son who will never die", a school which still proudly bears his name and his coat of arms.

The links with the Tuscan town remained strong even in recent times, with Mario, who was mayor of Siena between 1949 and 1951], and the many ties to the Contrada della Selva which uses the gardens and runs an "osteria" in the grounds of palazzo Vegni. The stables of the Contrada, used during the Palio for the racing horse, was donated by the family.

Giovanni's line is now divided into four main families, descendants of Guido (1869–1941) and Giuseppe Vegni (1864–1927), living in Siena, Milan, Rome, Paris and Neuchatel. Member of the family was the renowned particle physicist Guido Vegni CERN (1931–2016).

There are other branches of the Vegni's family in Siena, Arezzo and other main cities of Tuscany. A notable member is Lisimaco Vegni, an excellent doctor, well known for his skills in the place where he worked, Foiano della Chiana. On November 28th 2023 the hospital of "Foiano della Chiana" was named after him, for all the hard work and commitment that Lisimaco brought as a leading doctor but mostly as a humble employee.
