= Acquato Lake =

Lake in Tuscany, Italy

- Location within Italy
- Location: Capalbio, Province of Grosseto, Tuscany
- Coordinates: 42°29′12.00″N 11°27′18.00″E
- Basin countries: Italy
- Surface area: 0.102 km^{2} (0.039 sq mi)
- Surface elevation: 95 m (312 ft)

Acquato Lake is a lake at Capalbio in the Province of Grosseto, Tuscany, Italy. At an elevation of 95 m, its surface area is 0.102 square kilometres (0.039 sq mi).
