= Casone =

- Frazione
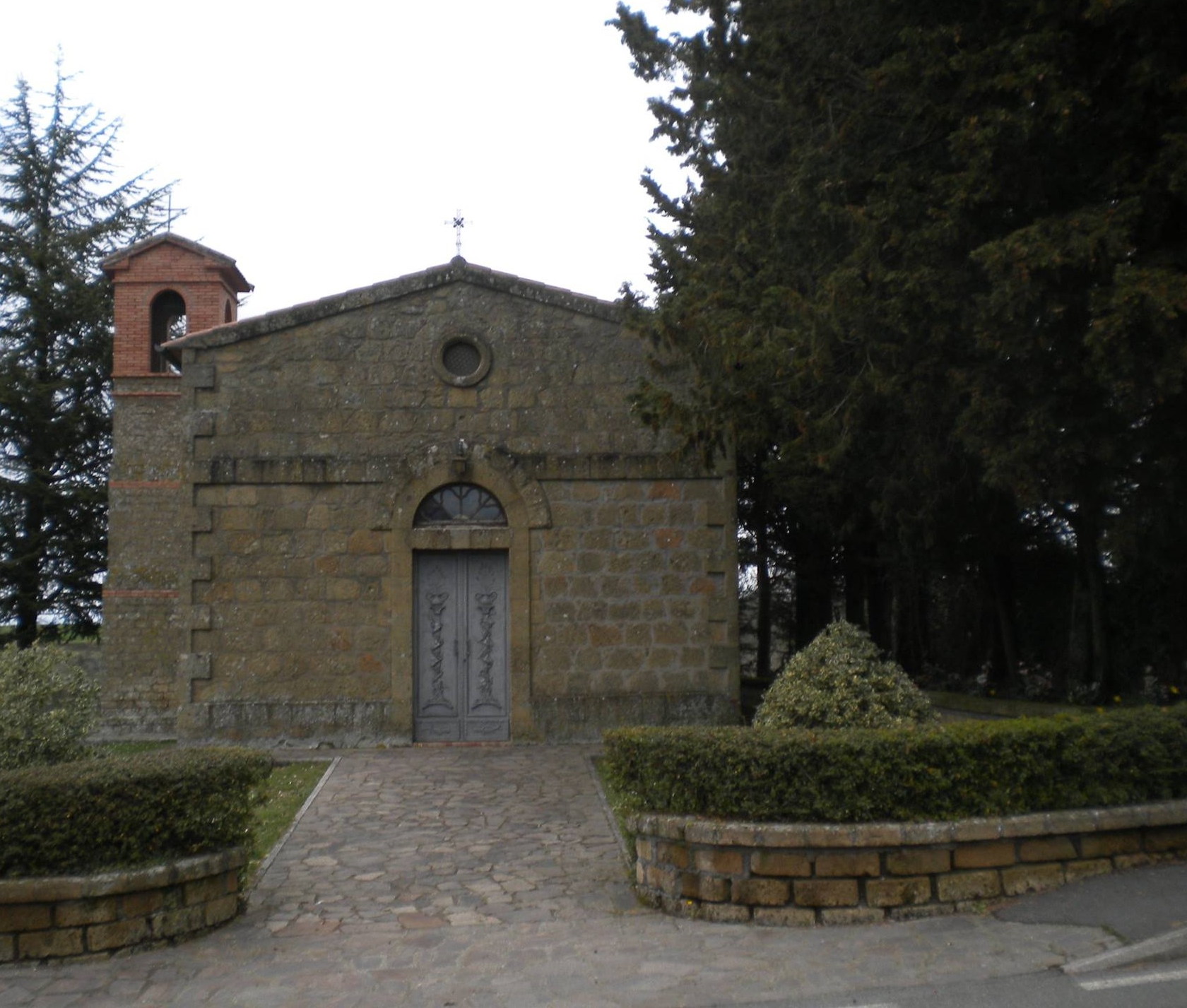
- The church of San Paolo della Croce

- Location of Casone in Italy
- Coordinates: 42°39′3″N 11°46′12″E
- Country: Italy
- Region: Tuscany
- Province: Grosseto (GR)
- Comune: Pitigliano
- Elevation: 520 m (1,710 ft)

Population (2011)
  - Total: 124
- Time zone: UTC+1 (CET)
  - Summer (DST): UTC+2 (CEST)
- Postal code: 58017
- Dialing code: (+39) 0564

Casone is a village in Tuscany, central Italy, administratively a frazione of the comune of Pitigliano, province of Grosseto, in the tuff area of southern Maremma. At the time of the 2001 census its population amounted to 130.

Casone is about 80 km from Grosseto and 9 km from Pitigliano, and it is situated along the Provincial Road which links Pitigliano to the province of Viterbo and Lazio.

== Main sights ==
- San Paolo della Croce, main church of the village, it was entirely re-built in the early 20th century in a Romanesque Revival style
- Casone War Memorial, memorial stone in remembrance of the fallen of the two world wars

== Bibliography ==
- Aldo Mazzolai, Guida della Maremma. Percorsi tra arte e natura, Le Lettere, Florence, 1997
