= Selvena =

- Frazione
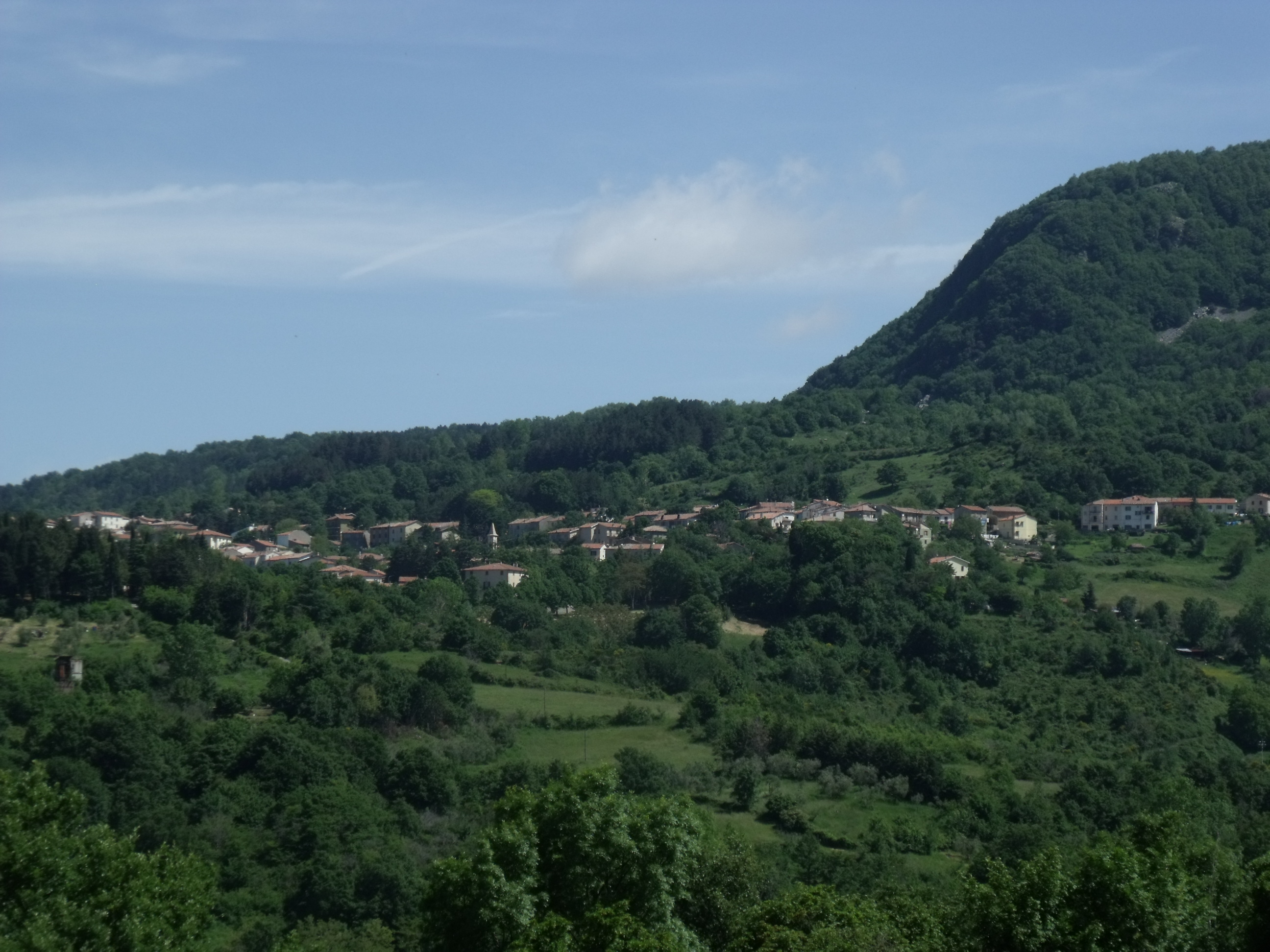
- View of Selvena

- Location of Selvena in Italy
- Coordinates: 42°46′1″N 11°38′32″E
- Country: Italy
- Region: Tuscany
- Province: Grosseto (GR)
- Comune: Castell'Azzara
- Elevation: 694 m (2,277 ft)

Population (2011)
  - Total: 480
- Demonym(s): Selvenesi, Selveniani, Selvignani
- Time zone: UTC+1 (CET)
  - Summer (DST): UTC+2 (CEST)
- Postal code: 58034
- Dialing code: (+39) 0564

Selvena is a small hill-town, population 578, in southern Tuscany, Italy. It stands at an altitude of 658 metres (2,159 feet) above sea level some 5 kilometres (3 miles) west of Castell'Azzara; administratively it falls within the comune of Castell'Azzara.

== History ==
The village dates back to the times of Etruscans and Romans, who exploited its important cinnabar mines. In the Middle Ages, the powerful Aldobrandeschi family (rulers of much of southern Tuscany) built here the massive Rocca Silvana (9th century), which saw an intense history of battles and sieges between the Aldobrandeschi, the Orsini and the Republic of Siena.
