= Province of Grosseto =

Province of Italy

Coordinates: 42°45′00″N 11°06′30″E

Province of Grosseto Provincia di Grosseto (Italian)
- Province
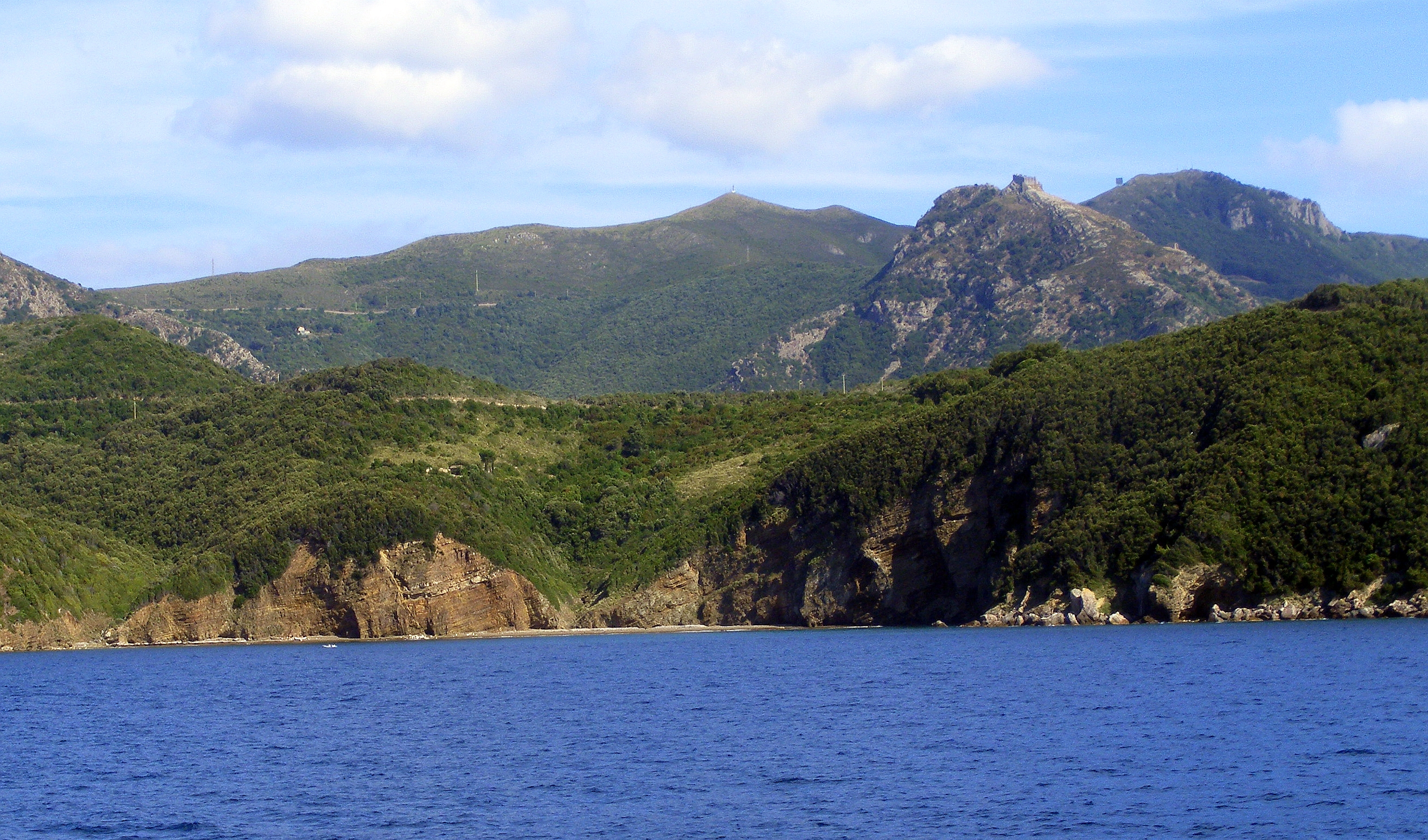
- Arcipelago Toscano National Park

- Flag Coat of arms

- Location of the province of Grosseto in Italy
- Country: Italy
- Region: Tuscany
- Capital(s): Grosseto
- Municipalities: 28

Government
  - President: Francesco Limatola (Centre-left)

Area
  - Total: 4,503.12 km^{2} (1,738.66 sq mi)

Population (2026)
  - Total: 214,863
  - Density: 47.7143/km^{2} (123.579/sq mi)

GDP
  - Total: €5.299 billion (2015)
  - Per capita: €23,649 (2015)
- Time zone: UTC+1 (CET)
  - Summer (DST): UTC+2 (CEST)
- Postal code: 58010-58012, 58014-58015, 58017, 58019-58020, 58022-58026, 58031, 58033-58034, 58036-58038, 58042-58045, 58051, 58053-58055
- Telephone prefix: 0564, 0566
- Vehicle registration: GR
- ISTAT code: 053
- Website: www.provincia.grosseto.it (in Italian)

The Province of Grosseto (Italian: provincia di Grosseto) is a province in the region of Tuscany in central Italy. Its capital is the city of Grosseto.

It has a population of 214,863 in an area of 4,503.12 square kilometres (1,738.66 sq mi) across its 28 municipalities.

== Geography ==
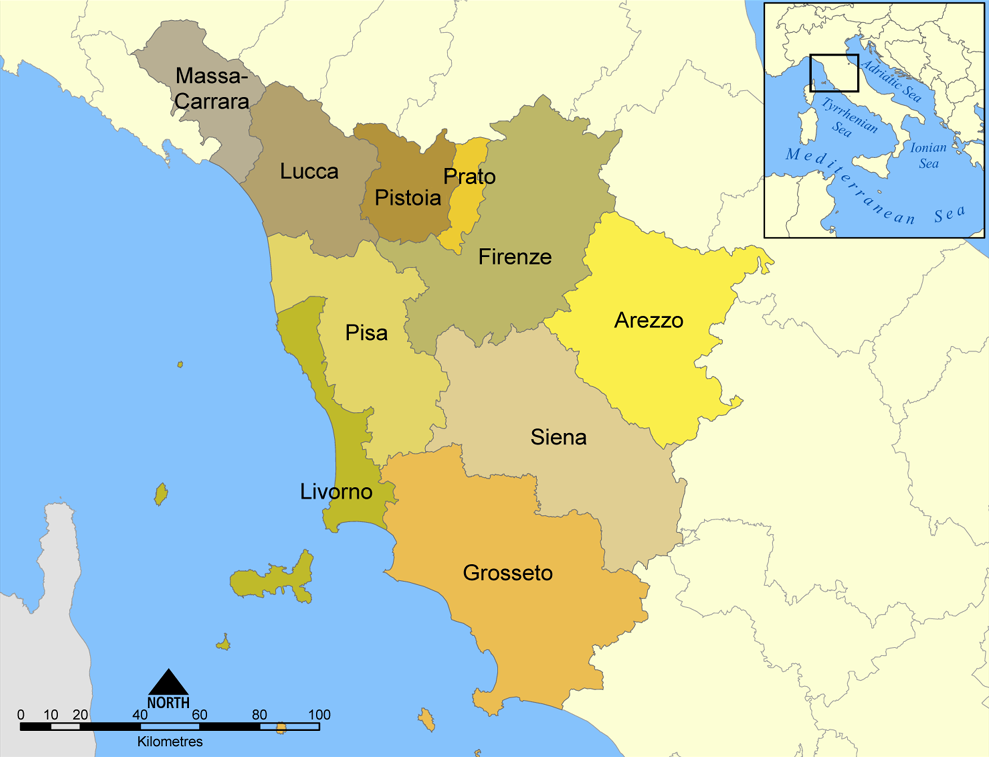
Map showing the position of the province in Tuscany.

The Province of Grosseto completely occupies the southern end of Tuscany, and with a territorial area of 4,504 square kilometres (1,739 mi^{2}), it is the most extensive in the region and one of the least dense in population in Italy. The province is bordered to the northwest by the Province of Livorno, to the north by the Province of Pisa, to the northeast by the Province of Siena, and to the southeast by the Province of Viterbo in Lazio. To the south is the Tyrrhenian Sea, which includes the southern islands of the Tuscan archipelago, including Isola del Giglio and the smaller Giannutri islands and Formiche di Grosseto and Formica di Burano. The Arcipelago Toscano National Park spans both the provinces of Grosseto and Livorno, and includes the seven main islands of the Tuscan Archipelago: Elba, Isola del Giglio, Capraia, Montecristo, Pianosa, Giannutri, Gorgona, and some of the minor islands and rock outcrops. The highest point in the park is Mount Capanne, at 1,019 metres (3,343 ft) in elevation, on the island of Elba.

The Colline Metallifere (Metalliferous Hills) line the border in the south with Lazio, and contain the Natural Park of Maremma, that protects also some of the remainings of the large swamps that once covered the area. Other protected areas are the Diaccia Botrona marshland. The principal rivers are the Ombrone, Fiora, Albegna, Pecora, Bruna, Merse, Lente, Farma and Chiarone. The coastline between the Gulf of Follonica and the mouth of the Chiarone is dominated by blue waters and pine forests, and is home to resorts such as Marina di Grosseto, Principina a Mare, Castiglione della Pescaia, Punta Ala, Puntone di Scarlino and Talamone. Lakes include Lago dell'Accesa, Lago di Burano, Lago di San Floriano and Lago Acquato. Also of note is the volcanic cone of Mount Amiata, Bandite di Scarlino (213 m), Promontorio di Punta Ala e delle Rocchette (350 m), Monti dell'Uccellina (417 m), Monte Argentario (635 m), and Promontorio di Ansedonia (113 m).

== Government ==
=== List of presidents ===
List of presidents of the province since 2014, the year of the Delrio reform.

President	Term start	Term end	Party
Emilio Bonifazi	14 October 2014	19 July 2016	Democratic Party
Antonfrancesco Vivarelli Colonna	9 January 2017	19 December 2021	Independent (centre-right)
Francesco Limatola	19 December 2021	Incumbent	Democratic Party

=== Municipalities ===
The province has 28 municipalities:

- Arcidosso
- Campagnatico
- Capalbio
- Castel del Piano
- Castell'Azzara
- Castiglione della Pescaia
- Cinigiano
- Civitella Paganico
- Follonica
- Gavorrano
- Grosseto
- Isola del Giglio
- Magliano in Toscana
- Manciano
- Massa Marittima
- Monte Argentario
- Monterotondo Marittimo
- Montieri
- Orbetello
- Pitigliano
- Roccalbegna
- Roccastrada
- Santa Fiora
- Scansano
- Scarlino
- Seggiano
- Semproniano
- Sorano

=== Frazioni ===
This is the complete list of the frazioni (singular: frazione) – towns and villages – in the province of Grosseto:

- Alberese
- Albinia
- Ansedonia
- Arcille
- Baccinello
- Bagno di Gavorrano
- Bagnoli
- Bagnolo
- Bagnore
- Batignano
- Boccheggiano
- Borgo Carige
- Borgo Santa Rita
- Braccagni
- Buriano
- Caldana
- Cana
- Capalbio Scalo
- Casale di Pari
- Casone
- Castellaccia
- Castell'Ottieri
- Castiglioncello Bandini
- Catabbio
- Cellena
- Cerreto
- Chiarone Scalo
- Civitella Marittima
- Dogana
- Elmo
- Filare
- Fonteblanda
- Frassine
- Gerfalco
- Ghirlanda
- Giannella
- Giannutri
- Giardino
- Giglio Campese
- Giglio Castello
- Giglio Porto
- Giuncarico
- Grilli
- Istia d'Ombrone
- La Torba
- Lago Boracifero
- Le Macchie
- Marina di Grosseto
- Marroneto
- Marrucheti
- Marsiliana
- Monte Antico
- Montebamboli
- Montebuono
- Montegiovi
- Montelaterone
- Montemassi
- Montemerano
- Montenero d'Orcia
- Montepescali
- Montevitozzo
- Montiano
- Monticello Amiata
- Montorgiali
- Montorio
- Montorsaio
- Murci
- Niccioleta
- Nomadelfia
- Paganico
- Pancole
- Pari
- Pereta
- Pescia Fiorentina
- Pescina
- Petricci
- Pian d'Alma
- Pian di Rocca
- Piloni
- Poderi di Montemerano
- Poggi del Sasso
- Poggio Capanne
- Poggio Murella
- Poggioferro
- Polveraia
- Pomonte
- Porrona
- Porto Ercole
- Porto Santo Stefano
- Potassa
- Prata
- Preselle
- Principina a Mare
- Principina Terra
- Punta Ala
- Puntone di Scarlino
- Ravi
- Ribolla
- Rispescia
- Roccamare
- Roccatederighi
- Rocchette
- Rocchette di Fazio
- Roselle
- Salaiola
- San Donato
- San Giovanni delle Contee
- San Lorenzo
- San Martino sul Fiora
- San Quirico
- San Valentino
- Santa Caterina
- Sasso d'Ombrone
- Sassofortino
- Saturnia
- Scarlino Scalo
- Selva
- Selvena
- Sovana
- Sticciano
- Stribugliano
- Talamone
- Tatti
- Tirli
- Torniella
- Travale
- Triana
- Vallerona
- Valpiana
- Vetulonia
- Zancona

== Demographics ==
As of 2026, the population is 214,863, of which 48.9% are male, and 51.1% are female. Minors make up 12.5% of the population, and seniors make up 29.6%.

Historical population

Year	Pop.	±%
1861	92,603	—
1871	96,616	+4.3%
1881	104,330	+8.0%
1901	137,830	+32.1%
1911	148,206	+7.5%
1921	163,645	+10.4%
1931	176,631	+7.9%
1936	185,925	+5.3%

Year	Pop.	±%
1951	212,295	+14.2%
1961	220,467	+3.8%
1971	216,325	−1.9%
1981	220,905	+2.1%
1991	216,015	−2.2%
2001	211,086	−2.3%
2011	220,564	+4.5%
2021	217,009	−1.6%

Source: ISTAT

=== Immigration ===
As of 2025, immigrants make up 13.6% of the total population. The 5 largest foreign countries of birth are Romania, Albania, Morocco, Ukraine, and North Macedonia.
