= Castell'Azzara =

- Comune
- Comune di Castell'Azzara
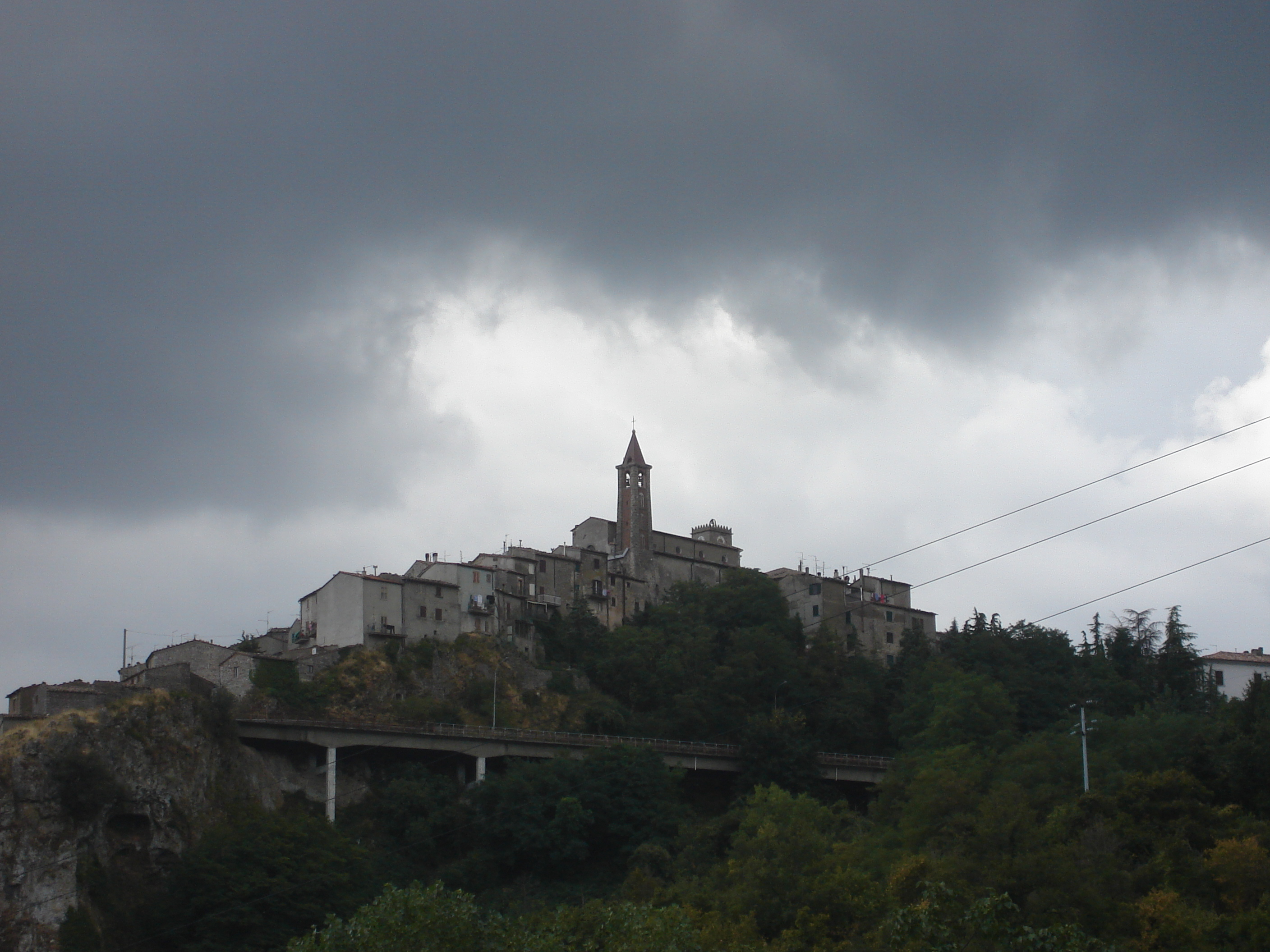

- Coat of arms

- Location within Italy Location within Tuscany
- Coordinates: 42°46′N 11°42′E
- Country: Italy
- Region: Tuscany
- Province: Grosseto (GR)
- Frazioni: Selvena

Government
  - Mayor: Maurizio Coppi

Area
  - Total: 64.23 km^{2} (24.80 sq mi)
- Elevation: 815 m (2,674 ft)

Population (1 January 2022)
  - Total: 1,309
  - Density: 20.38/km^{2} (52.78/sq mi)
- Demonym: Castellazzaresi
- Time zone: UTC+1 (CET)
  - Summer (DST): UTC+2 (CEST)
- Postal code: 58034
- Dialing code: 0564
- Patron saint: St. Nicholas
- Saint day: December 6
- Website: Official website

Castell'Azzara is a comune (municipality) in the Province of Grosseto in the Italian region Tuscany, located about 120 kilometres (75 mi) southeast of Florence and about 50 kilometres (31 mi) east of Grosseto.

It occupies the slopes of the Monte Amiata and was once important for the extraction of cinnabar. It was first under the Aldobrandeschi, and then part of the Sforza County of Santa Fiora until 1624.

== Main sights ==
- Rocca Aldobrandesca (Castle). Of the original complex the palace and the watchtower remain.
- Church of San Nicola, with some Renaissance parts.
- Church of Madonna del Rosario, including a Renaissance chapel and frescoes in the apse.
- Villa Sforzesca, built by the Sforza in the late 16th century

Nearby, in the frazione of Selvena, are the ruins of Rocca Silvana, a fortress of the Aldobrandeschi.
