= Aldobrandeschi family =

- Golden, with a half red lion on the right and half a red eagle on the left.
- Founded: 9th century
- Founder: Eriprando Aldobrandeschi
- Final ruler: Guido I Aldobrandeschi
- Titles: Count of Santa Fiora; Count of Sovana; Count of Pitigliano
- Dissolution: 1451

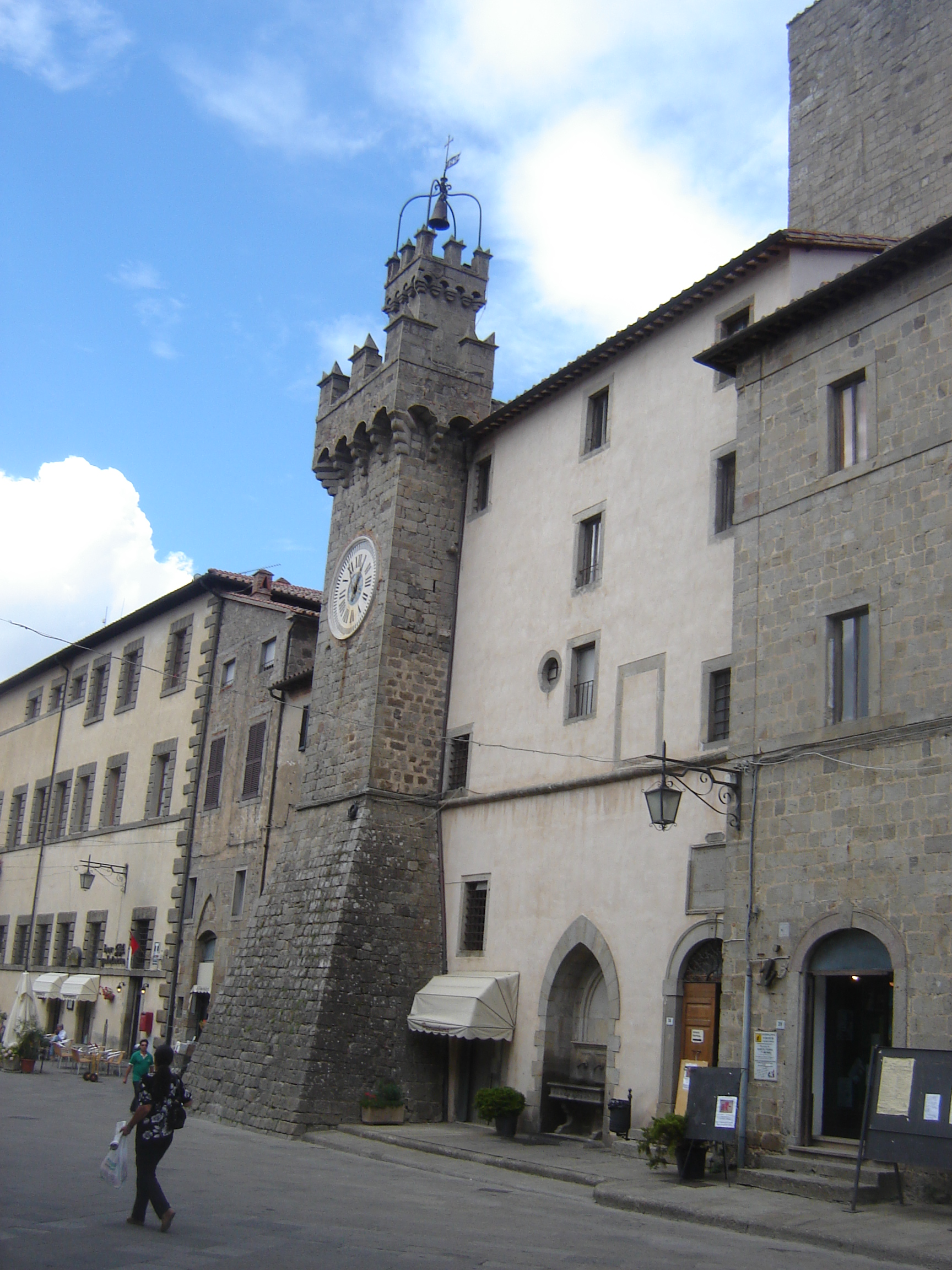
The Aldobrandesca tower set in the Palazzo Sforza-Cesarini of Santa Fiora (Gr)

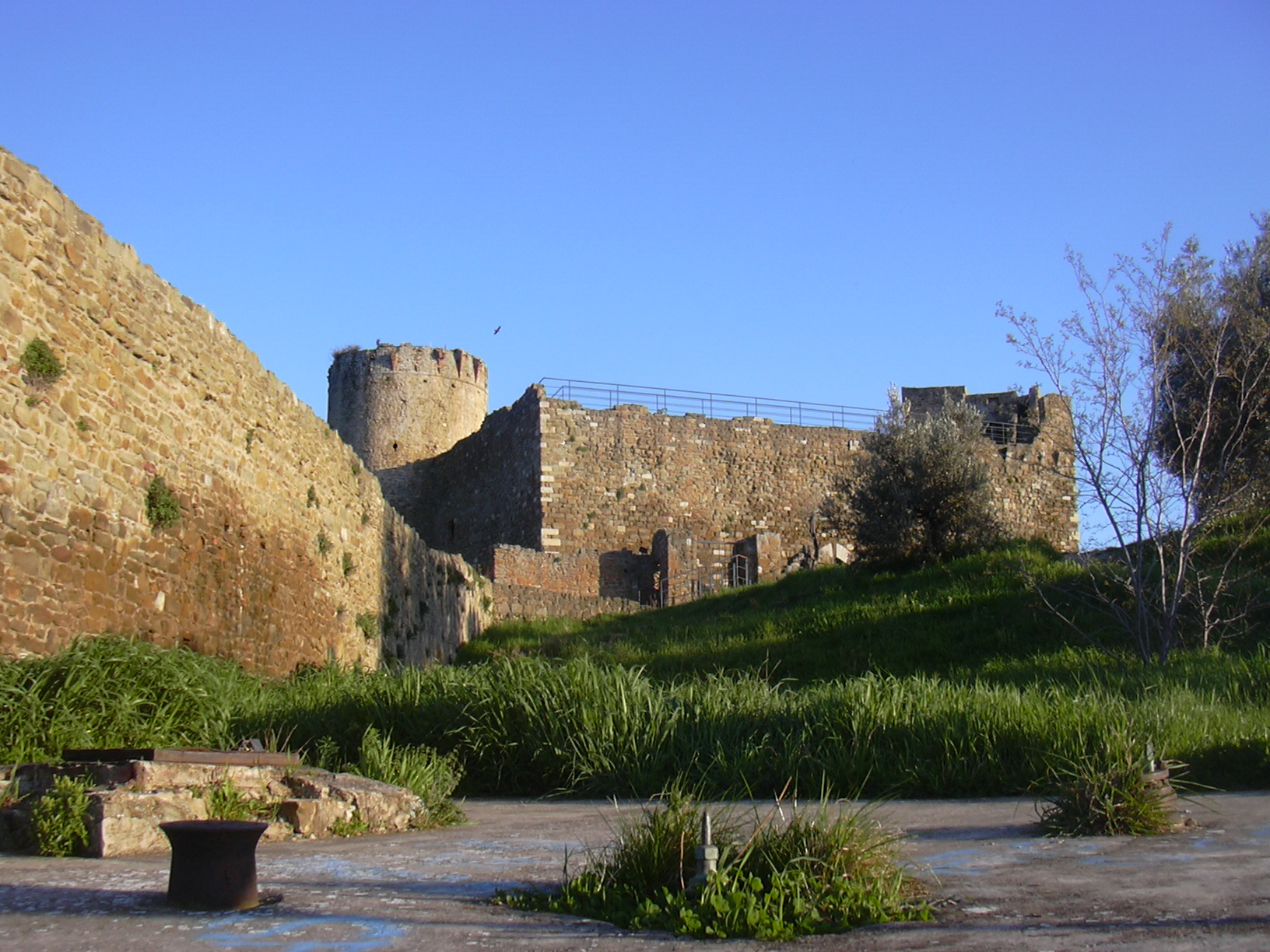
Castle of the Aldobrandeschi in Scarlino.

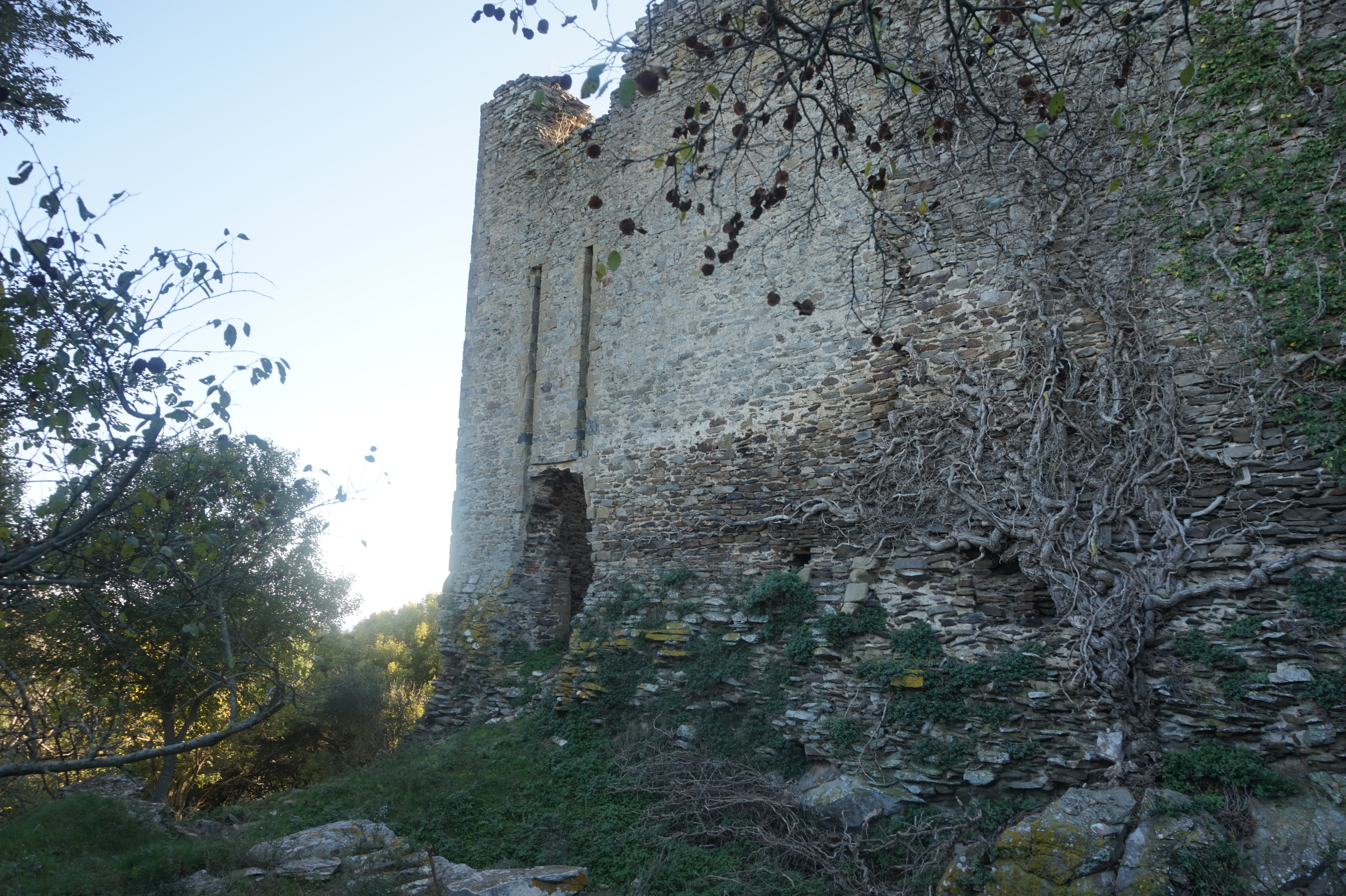
Rocca Aldobrandesca - Roccaccia di Montauto

The Aldobrandeschi family was an Italian noble family from southern Tuscany.

== Overview ==
Of probable Lombard origin, they appear in history as counts in the 9th century. The first known count was Hildebrand II (857). Their possession extended to what is now southern Tuscany and northern Lazio regions of Italy.

In 1274, their lands were divided between the County of Santa Fiora and the County of Sovana, which thenceforth were ruled by different branches of the family. After the extinction of the Aldobrandeschi of Sovana, the county was assigned to the Orsini. The Aldobrandeschi heiress of Santa Fiora married into the Sforza family.

The most famous members were: Guglielmo Aldobrandeschi, who lived in the 13th century and is cited by Dante Alighieri as the Gran Tosco ("Grand Tuscan"); Guglielmo's son is also cited in Canto XI of the Purgatorio in the Divine Comedy as an example of a sinner of pride; and Margherita, the last of the Aldobrandeschi of Sovana, who married Guy de Montfort, Count of Nola, and passed rule over Soana to her daughter Anastasia and son-in-law, Romano "Romanello" Orsini and their heirs.

== See also ==
- Republic of Siena
- Pitigliano
- Sovana
- County of Santa Fiora
