= Palla (game) =

Traditional Tuscan ball game

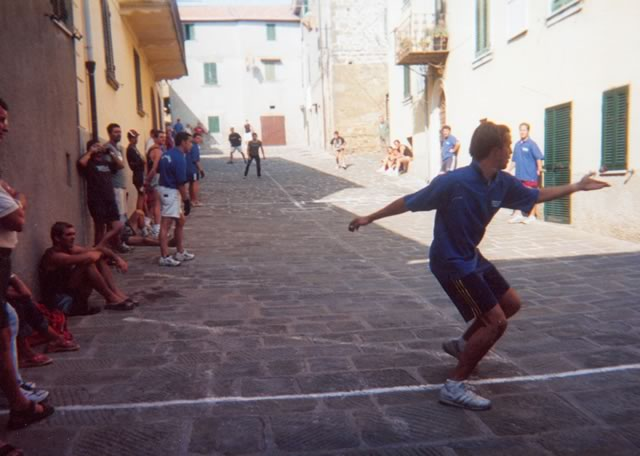
"Palla eh!" game in Vetulonia, 2001

Palla (Italian for ball) is a traditional Tuscan ball game played in villages between Siena and Grosseto. It is also called palla EH! (or pallaeh!) because players call out eh! before serving.

Small handmade balls contain a lead pellet wrapped in rubber and wool with a leather cover. The game is played by facing teams who strike (not catch) the ball with either a bare or gloved hand. Courts are marked out with painted lines on town streets, but there is no net, and players can move between sides. Adjacent buildings, objects, and sometimes spectators, are considered "in play." Play does stop for oncoming automobiles. Similar to real tennis, a second bounce can result in a "chase" rather than an outright point, marked in chalk where the ball stops rolling.

Scoring is identical to that of tennis (15-30-40-game). In the variant called pallaventuno (or palla 21) each game counts as 7, and a set is won with three games (7 for the first, 14 for the second, and 21 for the third, hence the name given to the game). In the other variant, games are simply counted in progression (game 1, game 2). Pallacorda (or palla della corda) is an extinct form of the game where a cord was strung across the street. Pisa, Prato, Rome, Siena, and various Tuscan towns still have streets named via Pallacorda or via Della Corda.

== Historical significance ==
Palla is of interest to those who study the history of tennis, as it provides some insight into the development of the more contemporarily popular sport. Given the similarities of scoring and the use of chases, it is highly likely palla and tennis share a common sporting ancestor, the various games of palla being more primal in form.

The fact that real tennis was originally played without racquets is well documented. The name of the sport in French is jeu de paume, or game of the palm (of the hand). However, the development of the net is documented less well. In real tennis the net is also referred to sometimes as "the line." Palla eh! uses only a line painted on the ground to mark territory, and this is probably all it was originally. The cord was added for pallacorda probably just to keep the players on their respective sides of the court, and a ball that went under the cord, yet across the line, was probably still a fair shot. Later illustrations of pallacorda and tennis show tassels hung from the cord to indicate if a ball went below the cord. The net was merely an enhancement on the tassels, and it now serves three functions: marking territory, controlling player movement, and restricting the flight of the ball. When modern lawn tennis adopted real tennis' net, it also brought with it these three functions.

The fact that variants of palla are all street games, and that they are clearly related to real tennis suggests something of the development of the latter sport's court. It had been assumed that a real tennis court developed from the layout of monastery cloisters. This is mainly due to the early popularity of the game among clerics, and similarities of some court features to a cloister. However, this theory has two problems. Cloisters are usually square, while a tennis court is much longer than it is wide. Secondly, some of the similar features of tennis courts were actually introduced in the 16th century, and earlier layouts were less similar to cloisters. The study of palla has led many to suggest that the first tennis courts were made by those who wanted to play the street game, but could afford a more private and much cleaner setting. Similarities to cloisters in later court designs could either be coincidence, or intentional innovations. The proportions of the court and features such as penthouses and windows could easily relate to medieval streets.

== Locations currently hosting the game ==
The game is still practiced today in six villages in Southern Tuscany. Normally the game is played from Spring through Summer. Tournaments are held in each village between July and August. The actual schedule of the tournaments is confirmed each year a few weeks before its start.

- Ciciano, in the Municipality of Chiusdino (SI), the first week-end of August.
- Piloni, in the Municipality of Roccastrada (GR), the second or third week-end of August (depending on agreements with Torniella)
- Scalvaia, in the Municipality of Monticiano (SI), the last week-end of July
- Torniella, in the Municipality of Roccastrada (GR), the second or third week end of August (depending on agreements with Piloni)
- Vetulonia, in the Municipality of Castiglione della Pescaia (GR), usually the last week-end of August
- Tirli, in the Municipality of Castiglione della Pescaia (GR), either around mid-July or after Vetulonia.

== See also ==
- Pallone
- Valencian pilota
