= Merse =

Merse may refer to:

- The Merse (river), in the Italian region of Tuscany
- The Val di Merse, an area including the valley of the river Merse
- the Merse (Scotland), a territory located on the boundaries of Scotland and England on the east side; today part of Berwickshire
- the Merse, an area within Scotland next to Kirkcudbright.
- A Scottish name for Salt marsh, an environment periodically flooded by sea water
- Merse (politician), an Inner Mongolian revolutionary of the 1920s and 1930s
