= Giordano Bruno Guerri =

Italian writer, journalist, and historian

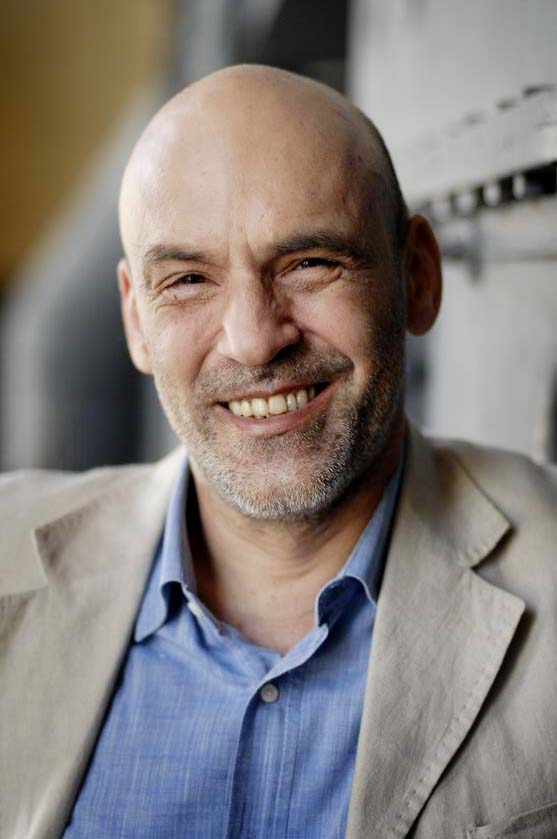
Bruno in 2007

Giordano Bruno Guerri (born 21 December 1950) is an Italian historian, writer, and journalist. He is an important scholar of twentieth-century Italy, in particular of the Fascist period and the relationship between Italians and the Catholic Church.

== Biography ==
Giordano Bruno Guerri was born in Iesa, a district of Monticiano, in the province of Siena. He is the son of Gina Guerri and Febo Anselmi, known as Ebo. Febo took Gina as his second wife, after the introduction of divorce in Italy.

Despite his name, his family provided him with a Catholic education. He told their story, from his grandparents to his infancy, in Ebo e Gina, published as an addition to the Corriere della Sera in July 2011. His parents, farmers living in Colle Val d’Elsa (Siena) after having been manual workers, opened a restaurant, and later a grocery store that went bankrupt. For two years (1963–64), they worked in Viareggio as domestic help, and in 1965 they moved with Giordano to Ospiate di Bollate, on the outskirts of Milan, to be a worker. There he alternated his studies with temporary jobs. He took part in the Sessantotto (the upheavals of 1968) "like a wild, snarling dog, but not politicized" and received his high school diploma in 1969. He then enrolled in the Department of Modern Literature (specializing in contemporary history) at the Università Cattolica del Sacro Cuore, in Milan. He himself would later say that this was out of curiosity to learn about life under the Fascist regime, described too superficially in his opinion by historians of that era.

At the start of his university studies, he went to live on his own, working as a proofreader, first at home and later at Garzanti, where he was employed until 1980. His Norme grafiche e redazionali, written in 1971 for Bompiani, is still in use. He graduated in 1974, having written a thesis entitled La Figura e l’opera di Giuseppe Bottai, un fascista critico, published by Feltrinelli in 1976.

In 1982 he was one of the curators of the exhibition Anni Trenta: Arte e cultura in Italia, mounted in the Palazzo Reale di Milano (Royal Palace of Milan), the Arengario, and the Galleria del Sagrato.

In 1985, after the success of his essay Povera santa, povero assassino: La vera storia di Santa Maria Goretti (published by Mondadori), he was named director of the monthly journal Storia Illustrata, even though he was not a journalist. Having finished his term there, he was enrolled in the roster of journalists in 1986. Using the concept of linking history to current events, he raised sales from 60 to 150,000 copies, and in 1986, he was promoted to editorial director of Mondadori, a position from which he resigned in 1988. In 1989, he became director of the monthly journal Chorus, a position he held until 1991, when he moved to New York.

In 1995, Guerri moved back to Rome and was offered the opportunity to host Italia mia benché, a TV show, with Cinzia Tani, which ran until 1997.

From 2003 to 2008 he was president of the Fondazione Ugo Bordoni, a cultural institute in the information technology and communications sector. In this capacity, he strove to be a ‘bridge between humanistic culture and scientific culture’ and founded the ForumTal, of which he is still president. TAL (Trattamento Automatico del Linguaggio) is the technology that teaches machines to understand, speak, and write Italian. On 1 April 2004, he also took over the direction of L’Indipendente, (where he made himself known for his impartial positions, for criticism of the right, and for having published on the front page an aphorism of the American poet John Giorno: ‘No dick is as hard as life is’). He was replaced in February 2005 by Gennaro Malgieri.

In 1984, Guerri began a collaboration with Il Giornale as a political and social columnist. In the meantime, he taught courses in contemporary history in the political science departments of the universities of Salerno, Madrid, Genoa, and Rio de Janeiro, and at Columbia University, in New York.

Now he teaches contemporary history at the Università Guglielmo Marconi in Rome. Since October 2008, he has been president (and since 2014 General Director) of the Fondazione Vittoriale degli Italiani, the home of Gabriele D’Annunzio in Gardone Riviera. Through innovative exhibitions and the acquisition of works of contemporary art and important documents, he has given it new life, increasing the number of visitors from 146,000 to 250,000. In 2016, Dario Franceschini, Minister of Cultural Heritage and Tourism, officially extended his term until 2021.

Since 2015, Guerri has been president of the Fondazione Opera pia Carità laicale and director of MuSa, the Museo di Salò. In 2016, he founded GardaMusei, which he directs, a cultural and tourism association based on cooperation among localities, museums, and other institutions. It has grown to include the Fondazione Guglielmo Marconi (Emilia-Romagna), the Fondazione Giovanni Pascoli (Tuscany), and Italian cultural institutes in other countries.

In the spring of 2017, Bocconi d’inchiostro, the student-led ‘salotto’ (literary gathering) of the Università commerciale Luigi Bocconi di Milano, awarded him the ‘Dante d’Oro’ for his complete oeuvre, a prize that is just one of many he has received.

== Private life ==
After his first marriage (1983-1988) to the writer Gaia de Beaumont, Guerri became involved with the author Paola Veneto in 2005. They married in 2014 and have two sons, Nicola Giordano (2006) and Pietro Tancredi (2011).

== Politics ==
Guerri defines himself as liberal, libertarian, laissez-faire, and an ex-libertine, like the Partito Radicale, which he has sometimes supported in the past and shares views with, such as the struggle against the death penalty. He and Ida Magli founded a cultural movement, ‘ItalianiLiberi’, anti-Europe and free-thinking, for which he has directed the online journal italianiliberi.it.

After television came employment in the public sector. Mario Caligiuri, mayor of the Calabrian commune of Soveria Mannelli, offered him the position of cultural advisor. Guerri accepted but set as a condition being called ‘Advisor for the Dissolution of the Obvious’, a title under which he did indeed begin serving on 1 August 1997. Among the explanations he gave for his sudden departure from this post, which he had himself created, was ‘too many official dinners’. During his four weeks in this position, however, he received attention for a few provocative ordinances, for example, the Monument to the Rubbish Bin (Garbage Can). The idea behind it was to inform public opinion about the inappropriateness of placing unattractive rubbish bins in areas of cities of high artistic or architectural value. As cultural advisor, he also promoted the first ‘White Night’ (an all-night arts festival) in Italy, which took place in the Presila region of Calabria on 18 August 1997. In 2006, he was one of the signers of the manifesto of the Riformatori Liberali, which requested dialogue with the centre-right coalition on various ethical matters like euthanasia, soft drug use, prostitution, and gay marriage.

== Literary output ==
In 1976, Feltrinelli published his university thesis entitled Giuseppe Bottai, un fascista critico. Appearing at the same time as Renzo De Felice's book on popular acceptance of the Fascist regime, the essay placed him amongst the most authoritative Italian historic ‘revisionists’. The biography of the party official opened the debate on Fascist culture and its continued influence on Italian society after World War II. This is a subject to which Guerri returned, contributing to scientific and educational journals (for example, editing the social and political life section of the catalogue for the exhibition Anni Trenta, organized by the city of Milan in 1982).

During this period, Guerri wrote four books that comprise his series on the Fascist ruling class: Rapporto al Duce (Bompiani, 1978), a collection of historic documents; a biography of Galeazzo Ciano, son of the party official as well as Mussolini's son-in-law (Bompiani, 1979); L’Arcitaliano: Vita di Curzio Malaparte, based on previously unpublished documents about his life; and an essay on Italo Balbo.

He was editor of the Diaries of Giuseppe Bottai, in two volumes (Volume I: 1935-1944 and Volume II, 1944–1948), published by Rizzoli in 1982 and 1988.

In 1983, Guerri published Io, l’infame (Mondadori, 1983), a biography of Red Brigade member Patrizio Peci, written together with the terrorist during a two-week period when Peci was in hiding from his ex-comrades.

In spite of his Catholic education, Guerri considered himself an atheist. He was not concerned with religious questions until he was 32 years old, when he began to write Povera santa, Povero assassino, the story of Maria Goretti. When the book came out, in February 1985, Cardinal Pietro Palazzini, prefect of the Congregazione per le cause dei santi, called it "an instrument of the Devil’. Controversy also surrounded Guerri's book Io ti assolvo, his account of false confessions made to priests during a trip around Italy, in which he highlighted differences among Catholic priests on the same subjects as well as their varied approaches to the appropriate penitence, all of which he found questionable. These two books were strongly criticized by the Vatican and by Catholic institutions in general. Anticlericalism and secular points of view on spiritualism appeared several times in his television appearances as well.

Another educational work is Fascisti: Gli italiani di Mussolini, il regime degli italiani (Mondadori, 1995).

In 1992, Guerri published Gli italiani sotta la Chiesa: Da san Pietro a Mussolini (Mondadori) and in 1997, L’Antistoria degli italiani: Da Romolo a Giovanni Paolo II, which is coming out in an updated version in May 2018. Other important works are the biographies of Ernesto Buonaiuti, Gabriele D’Annunzio, and Filippo Tommaso Marinetti.

In 2018, he published D’Annunzio e il piacere della moda, with photos by Lorenzo Capellini (Rubbettino). Il Giornale published a collection of his articles entitled Lezioni di libertà: Contro I pregiudizi, i luoghi comuni, l’omologazione: un grande maestro del pensiero.

His works have been translated into French, English, Dutch, Polish, Portuguese, Serbian, Croatian, Spanish, German, and Hungarian.

== Writings ==
- Giuseppe Bottai, un fascista critico. Ideologia e azione del gerarca che avrebbe voluto portare l'intelligenza nel fascismo e il fascismo alla liberalizzazione, Milano, Feltrinelli, 1976; Giuseppe Bottai, fascista, Milano, Mondadori, 1996. ISBN 88-04-41156-2; 1998. ISBN 88-04-44240-9; Giuseppe Bottai, Milano, Bompiani, 2010. ISBN 978-88-452-6572-3.
- Rapporto al Duce, (editor), Milano, Bompiani, 1978.
- Galeazzo Ciano. Una vita (1903-1944), Milano, Bompiani, 1979; 1985; 2011. ISBN 978-88-452-6569-3.
- L'arcitaliano. Vita di Curzio Malaparte, Milano, Bompiani, 1980; Milano, Leonardo, 1991. ISBN 88-355-1022-8; Milano, Bompiani, 2008. ISBN 978-88-452-6083-4.
- Italo Balbo, Milano, Vallardi, 1984.
- Povera santa, povero assassino. La vera storia di Maria Goretti, Milano, A. Mondadori, 1985; 1993. ISBN 88-04-37245-1.
- La mezza vita di Vincent van Gogh, Milano, Leonardo, 1990. ISBN 88-355-0056-7.
- Gli italiani sotto la Chiesa. Da san Pietro a Mussolini, Milano, A. Mondadori, 1992. ISBN 88-04-36110-7; Gli Italiani sotto la Chiesa. da San Pietro a Berlusconi, Milano, Saggi Bompiani, 2011. ISBN 978-88-452-6699-7.
- Io ti assolvo. Etica, politica, sesso: i confessori di fronte a vecchi e nuovi peccati, Milano, Baldini & Castoldi, 1993. ISBN 88-85989-38-1.
- Paolo Garretto, Matera, La Bautta, 1994.
- Fascisti. Gli italiani di Mussolini, il regime degli italiani, Milano, A. Mondadori, 1995. ISBN 88-04-38945-1.
- Antistoria degli italiani. Da Romolo a Giovanni Paolo II, Milano, Mondadori, 1997. ISBN 88-04-42582-2.
- Il Malaparte illustrato, Milano, Mondadori, 1998. ISBN 88-04-44731-1.
- Eretico e profeta. Ernesto Buonaiuti, un prete contro la Chiesa, Milano, Mondadori, 2001. ISBN 88-04-48985-5; Torino, UTET Libreria, 2007. ISBN 978-88-02-07781-9.
- Rapporto al duce. L'agonia di una nazione nei colloqui tra Mussolini e i federali nel 1942, Milano, Mondadori, 2002. ISBN 88-04-50679-2.
- Un amore fascista. Benito, Edda e Galeazzo, Milano, Mondadori, 2005. ISBN 88-04-53467-2.
- Pensieri scorretti. 1837 aforismi per togliere la ragione e chi ce l'ha, Torino, UTET, 2007. ISBN 978-88-02-07705-5.
- D'Annunzio. L'amante guerriero, Milano, Mondadori, 2008. ISBN 978-88-04-57420-0.
- Filippo Tommaso Marinetti. Invenzioni, avventure e passioni di un rivoluzionario, Milano, Mondadori, 2009. ISBN 978-88-04-58595-4.
- Follia? Vita di Vincent van Gogh, Milano, Bompiani, 2009. ISBN 978-88-452-6314-9.
- Il sangue del Sud. Antistoria del Risorgimento e del brigantaggio, Milano, Mondadori, 2010. ISBN 978-88-04-60330-6.
- Il bosco nel cuore. Lotte e amori delle brigantesse che difesero il Sud, Milano, Mondadori, 2011. ISBN 978-88-04-61371-8.
- Ebo e Gina, Milano, RCS Quotidiani, 2011.
- La mia vita carnale. Amori e passioni di Gabriele d'Annunzio, Milano, Mondadori, 2013. ISBN 978-88-04-62627-5.
- Con D'Annunzio al Vittoriale, fotografie di Lorenzo Capellini, Bologna, Minerva, 2015. ISBN 978-88-73-81-646-1.
- Il Vittoriale degli Italiani. Guida alla visita, Milano, Silvana, 2015. ISBN 978-88-3663-089-9.
- Io D'Annunzio, Salò, Damiani, 2016. ISBN 978-88-9943-803-6
- Antistoria degli italiani. Da Romolo a Grillo, Milano, La Nave di Teseo, 2018. (coming out in May)

=== As editor ===
- Giuseppe Bottai, Diario 1935-1944, Milano, Rizzoli, 1982.
- Luigi Bolla, Perché a Salò. Diario dalla Repubblica Sociale Italiana, Milano, Bompiani, 1982.
- Giuseppe Bottai, Diario 1944-1948, Milano, Rizzoli, 1988. ISBN 88-17-33158-9.
- Patrizio Peci, Io, l'infame, Milano, A. Mondadori, 1983.
- Winston Churchill (as told by), Le grandi battaglie della seconda guerra mondiale, Milano, A. Mondadori, 1994. ISBN 88-04-38912-5.
- Winston Churchill (as told by), I grandi protagonisti della seconda guerra mondiale, Milano, A. Mondadori, 1995. ISBN 88-04-39127-8.
- Gian Franco Venè (as told by), La vita quotidiana degli italiani durante il fascismo, Milano, A. Mondadori, 1995. ISBN 88-04-40200-8.
- Ida Magli, Per una rivoluzione italiana, Milano, Baldini & Castoldi, 1996. ISBN 88-8089-151-0. Nuova edizione Milano, Bompiani, 2017.
