= Montalcinello =

- Frazione
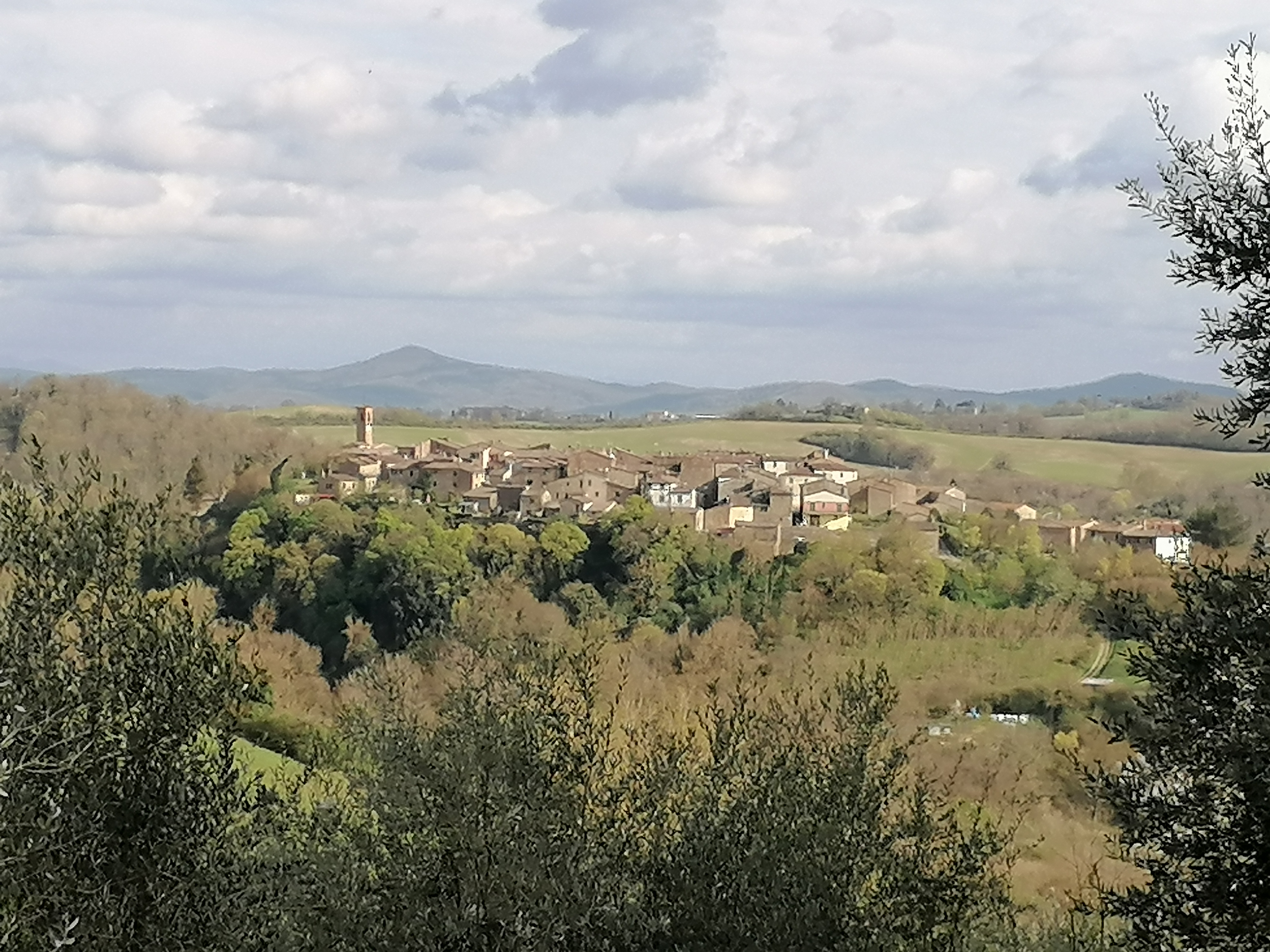
- View of Montalcinello

- Location of Montalcinello in Italy
- Coordinates: 43°11′48″N 11°4′40″E
- Country: Italy
- Region: Tuscany
- Province: Siena (SI)
- Comune: Chiusdino
- Elevation: 378 m (1,240 ft)

Population (2011)
  - Total: 148
- Time zone: UTC+1 (CET)
  - Summer (DST): UTC+2 (CEST)

Montalcinello is a medieval village, now a hamlet of the municipality of Chiusdino in the Val di Merse, in the province of Siena, Tuscany, Italy.

The toponym "Montalcinello," previously Montalcino (Mons licinus), likely derives from the presence of holm oak trees that have covered the hill since its origin.

== History ==
Montalcinello originated as a rural settlement near a church, situated on a hill surrounded by centuries-old oaks, holm oaks, brambles, and scrub, at the foot of which the Quarta stream and Saio creek flow. To combat the insecurity caused by the presence of bandits, mercenary companies, and wolves, the village was transformed into a fortified settlement. Its political history was tied to the rule of the Bishopric of Volterra, then the Republic of Siena, and finally the Grand Duchy of Tuscany.

Its origins date back at least to the 10th century, and Montalcinello was the first community in the area to appear in written documents. Some documents attest to the presence of the Pieve of San Magno as early as 987. The small castle of Montalcinello was contested between the Counts of Gherardesca of Frosini and the Bishop of Volterra. In 1133, an agreement was made between the contenders, placing the castle under the bishop's jurisdiction.

At this time, the importance of the village ('Montalcin de' Vescovi') grew to the point that a new church was needed, and it became the prestigious location for a bishopric mint, which was moved from Montieri to Montalcinello because it was considered safer. The mint was located in the ancient buildings of the current villa of the Count, opposite the small square. The government of the village was ensured by three "Priori," appointed by the "Counselors"; a "Camarlingo" was responsible for the finances and communal property, with revenues guaranteed by taxes imposed by the "Stimatori." Montalcinello remained under the jurisdiction of the Bishop of Volterra until the second half of the 14th century, when it passed under the Republic of Siena, losing its autonomy. Since then, the fate of the castle has followed the political and economic events of the town of Siena.

The exact date of the construction of the castle walls with moat is not known, but it was built between the 1300s and 1400s. The walls had two gates, each with a watchtower, which were opened in the morning to allow the inhabitants to leave for the fields and closed at sunset when they returned.

Despite the presence of the small castle, historical documents reveal that Montalcinello had a poor, rural life focused on hunting and agriculture, marked by endemic water shortages that were only resolved with the installation of potable water sources in 1933. In particular, a report from 1676 notes that there were no wealthy residents, as most of the population lived in rented or sharecropped homes, and even those who owned land or a house had possessions of little value.

Montalcinello began to grow and prosper only around the middle of the 19th century, starting in 1855, with the construction and modernization of the local road network: the SS 541 Traversa Maremmana, which connects Colle di Val d'Elsa to Maremma via the SS 73 Senese Aretina, and new roads to Chiusdino and Montingegnoli.

During World War II, Montalcinello was the scene of significant events related to the Resistance. On 24 June 1944, five young partisans lost their lives near the village during an attack on a German convoy. Among them, Ugo Mancini, aged 20, was transported by truck to the village of Montalcinello and hung behind the old elementary school as a warning to the population against further acts of resistance against the soldiers of the Reich. In their memory, the village has dedicated four streets and a small square to these fallen heroes.

More recently, the territory of Montalcinello, like the surrounding areas, has been involved in geothermal drilling for electricity production.

In early 2025, work began on the creation of a district heating network powered by geothermal energy.

== Monuments and Places of Interest ==
The medieval structure of the village has remained almost unchanged, with its cobbled streets (known as 'chioche') and the picturesque small square where a potable water well once stood, to which the inhabitants went to draw water with their own buckets and ropes.

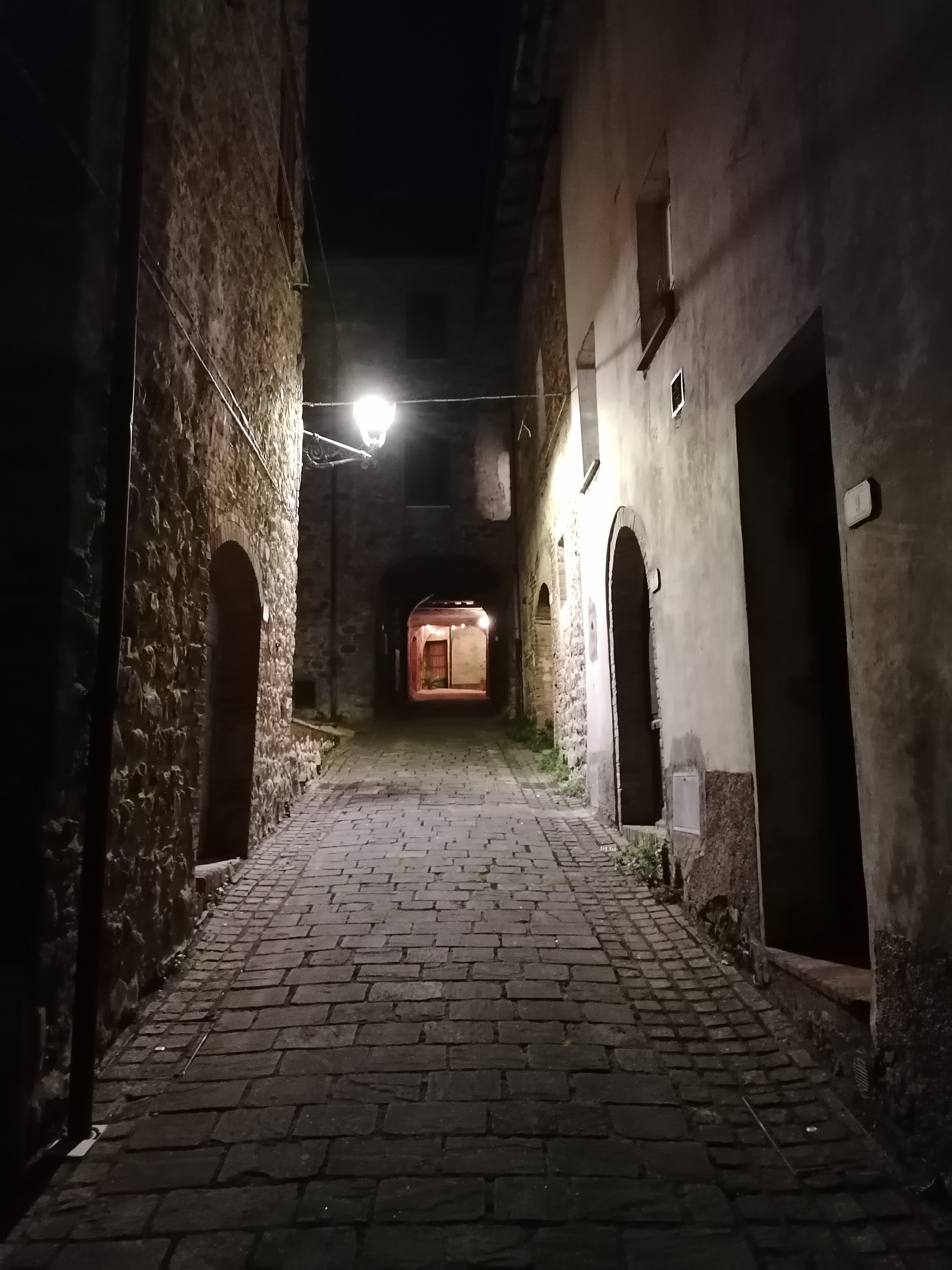
Via dell'Erba Medica

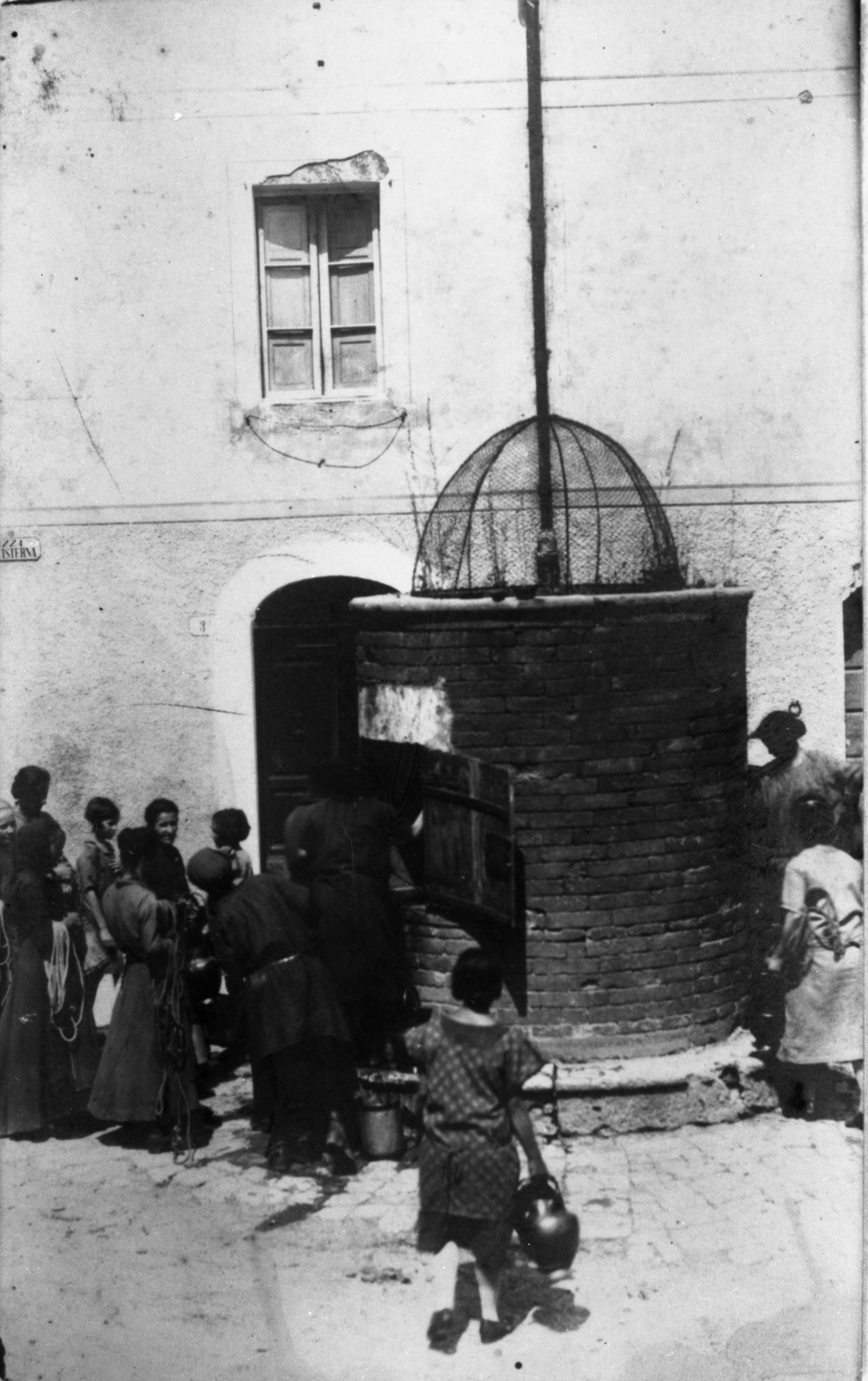
The Cistern in the small square (1925)

The castle, however, has been altered. The castle walls had three gates: the Porta di Sopra, Porta di Mezzo, and Porta di Sotto. The walls had raised sections that no longer exist.

In Montalcinello is located the Church of San Magno, which dates back to before the year 1000, with its current structure resulting from reconstruction in 1290. The sacristy and rectory were built in the 1500s. During the passage of the front in the last war, the church suffered severe damage to the roof, bell tower, and floor, requiring its closure for an extended period to allow for restoration work.

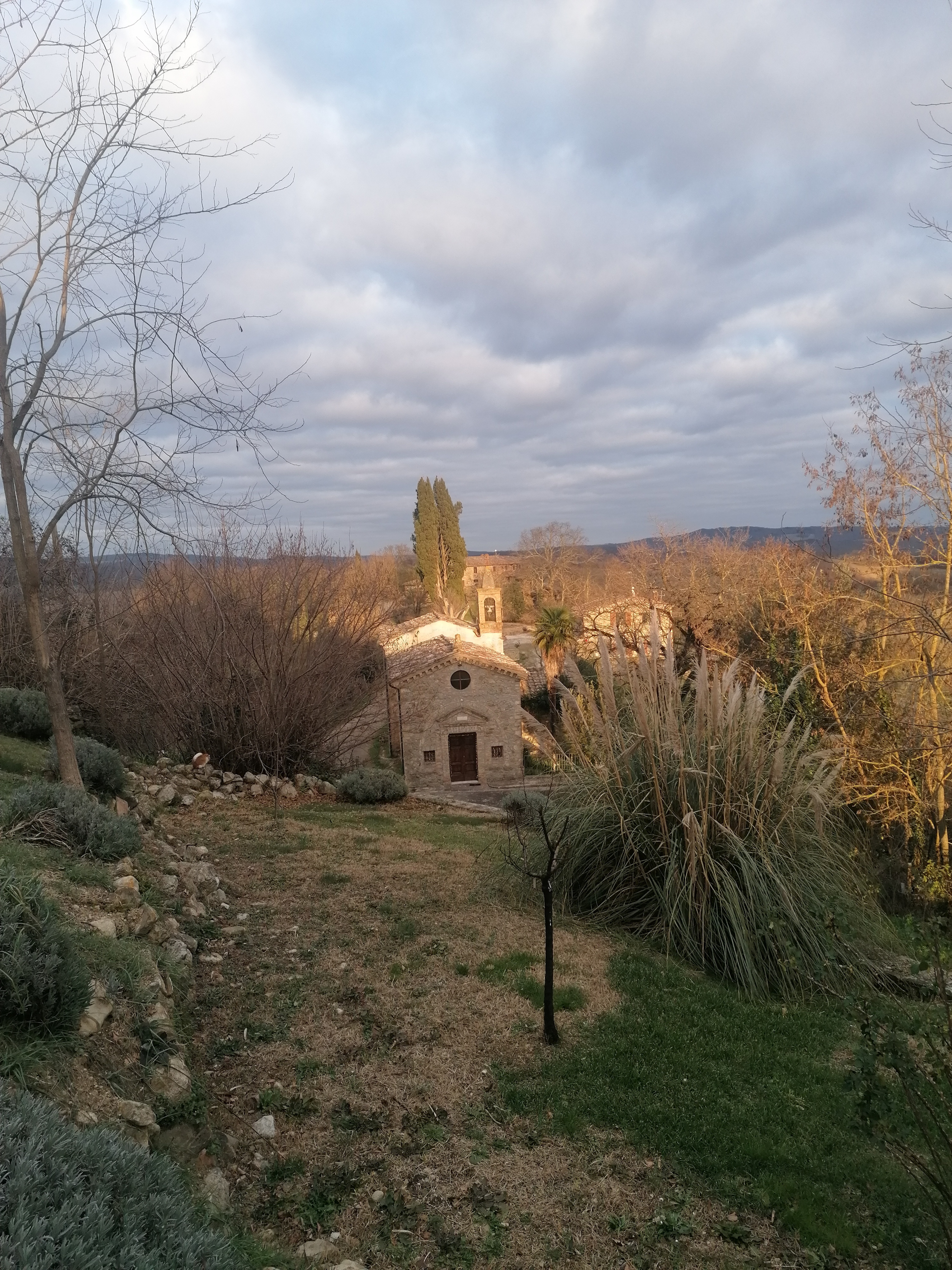
Oratory of Our Lady of Consolation

Just outside the village is the Oratory of Our Lady of Consolation (17th century). It was built thanks to the donations and efforts of the Confraternity of the Blessed Virgin Mary of Consolation, whose members actively participated in the religious life of the village. The Confraternity was established to promote the worship of the Madonna, assist the sick, transport the deceased, and offer prayers for the dead.

Below the village extends a rugged wooded area known as "Gli Scogli," characterized by imposing rock formations that drop steeply into a ravine, nicknamed by children "the ravine of death", due to a tragedy on 9 July 1949, when a nearly three-year-old boy, Alcaro Furio, lost his life after slipping while chasing a piglet. This area, mostly unspoiled, has over time become the setting for folk tales and legends, fueled by its mysterious charm and its role as a playground for generations of young people. Among the legends passed down orally, one is particularly well known, saying that under a tower house located in the current "Via degli Scogli," there was a trapdoor that concealed the entrance to an underground tunnel leading to the Pieve of San Giovanni in Sorciano.

== Culture ==
Montalcinello, and especially its inhabitants, preserves traces of the past: they can be recognized in the traditions that still survive, in the slow rhythms that mark the days, in the attentive gaze directed towards nature, time, and the seasons. It is evident in the collective participation of the village when the hunters return from a wild boar hunt; in the songs and colors of the Corpus Christi processions, with streets covered in rose petals and broom flowers; in the feast of Our Lady of Consolation, celebrated on the first Sunday of Lent, with candles carried in procession by unmarried girls; and also in the Feast of Saint Magno (19 August) and the Sagra del Dolce, where all the women of the village prepare traditional local sweets.
