= Galgano Guidotti =

Catholic saint from Tuscany (1148–1181)

Saint Galgano Guidotti
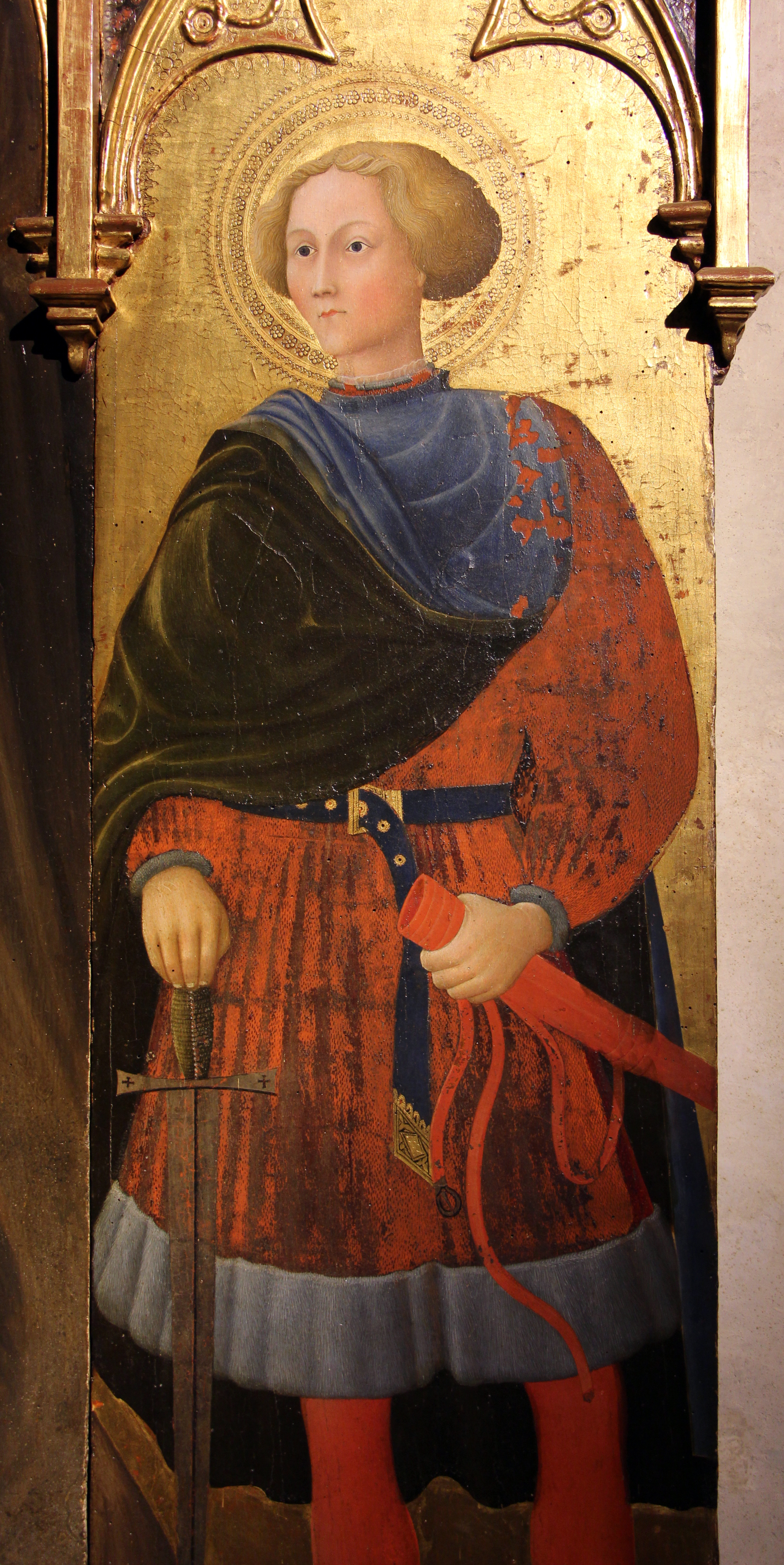
- 15th-century portrait by Giovanni d'Ambrogio
- Born: 1148; Chiusdino, Siena, Italy
- Died: 1181; Montesiepi, Tuscany, Italy
- Venerated in: Roman Catholic Church
- Canonized: 1185 by Pope Lucius III
- Feast: 30 November

Galgano Guidotti (1148 – 3 December 1181) (Note: His date of death is said to be 3 December 1181, but other scholars assign it to 30 November 1180. The Roman Catholic Church celebrates Saint Galgano on 30 November, as ordered in 2004 by Pope John Paul II.) was a Catholic saint from Tuscany born in Chiusdino, in the modern province of Siena, Italy. His mother's name was Dionigia, while his father's name (Guido or Guidotto) only appeared in a document dated in the 16th century, when the last name Guidotti was attributed. He is known for the Sword in the Stone relic by the ruins of the Abbey of San Galgano near Siena.

== Legend ==
The son of a feudal lord, Galgano became a knight, and is said to have led a riotous life before his conversion.

According to legend, while on the road near Siena, his horse threw him into the dust. An invisible angel, the archangel Saint Michael, lifted him to his feet and led him to Monte Siepi, a rugged hill close to his home town of Chiusdino. In a vision, he saw a round temple on the hill, with Jesus and Mary surrounded by the Apostles. The angel urged him to repent his sins, but Galgano protested that he could no more do this than to split a rock with a sword. To prove his point, he drew his blade and thrust at the stony ground, but the sword slid easily into the living rock, where it remains stuck fast to this day.

Galgano settled on the hill as a poor hermit. He befriended wild animals, and once, when the Devil sent a wicked monk to kill him, the wild wolves brought down the killer and gnawed his bones. He died in 1181 aged 33 years.

== Canonization and veneration ==
In 1184, a round chapel was built over his tomb as in his vision; many pilgrims visited and miracles were claimed. The canonization process to declare Galgano a saint started in 1185, only a few years after his death, and was the first conducted with a formal process by the Roman Church. Galgano's life was documented in the canonization process, as well as in Vitae: Legenda beati Galgani, Legenda beati Galgani confessoris, Leggenda di Sancto Galgano, Vita sancti Galgani de Senis, and Vita beati Galgani.

In 1184, Cistercian monks took over Montesiepi at the request of Hugh, bishop of Volterra, and most of Galgano's monks scattered over Tuscany and became Augustinian hermits. By 1220, San Galgano Abbey, a large Cistercian monastery, had been built below Galgano's hermitage: he was then claimed and recognized as a Cistercian saint. His cult was lively in Siena and Volterra, where numerous representations survive. The ruins of his hermitage can still be seen, while his cloak is kept in the church of Santuccio at Siena.

== The sword in the stone ==
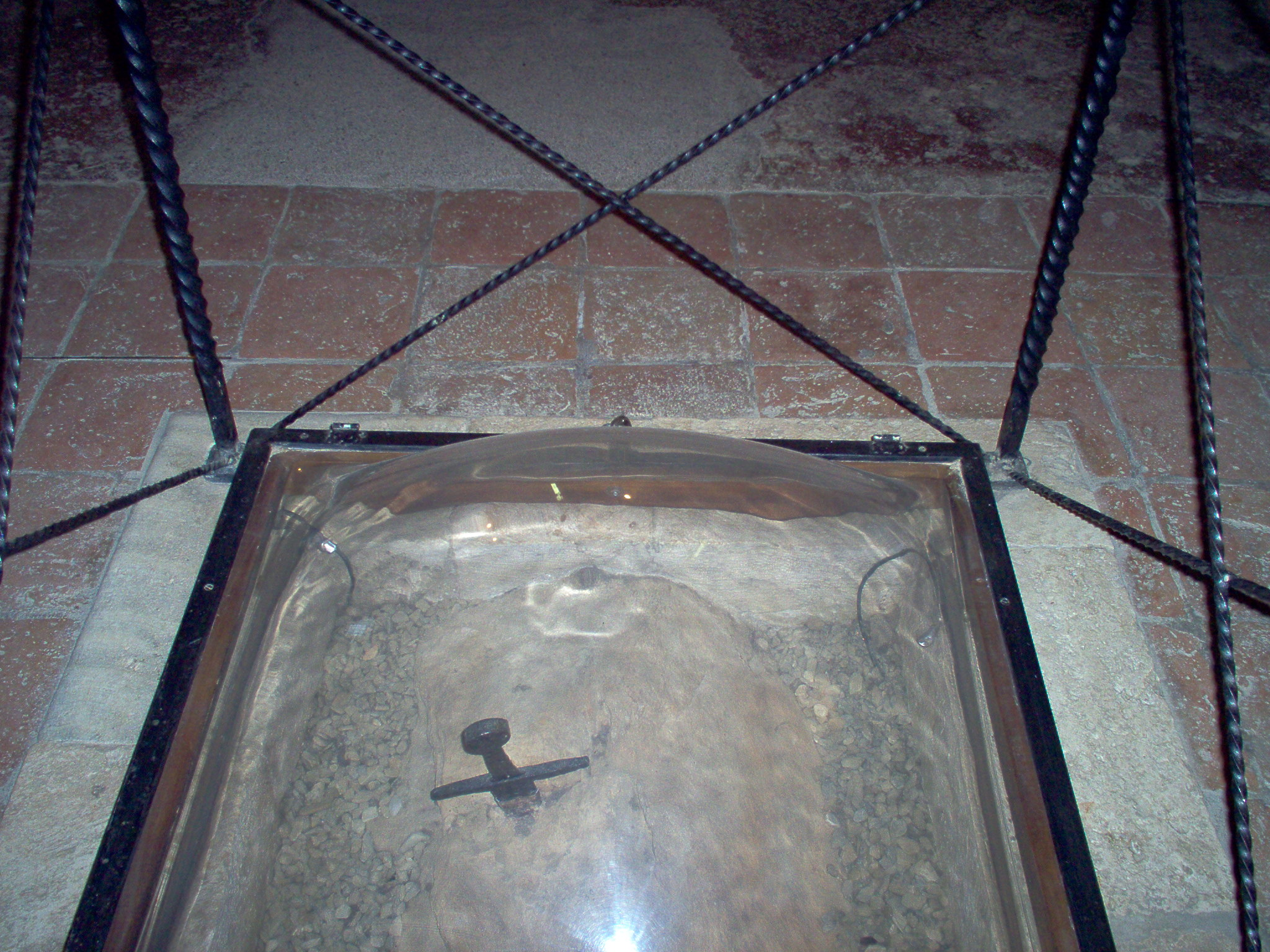
The sword in the stone at Montesiepi Chapel

The sword in the stone relic can be seen at the Rotonda at Montesiepi, near the ruins of the Abbey of San Galgano. An analysis of the protruding metal handle done in 2001 by Luigi Garlaschelli confirmed that the "composition of the metal and the style are compatible with the era of the legend". The analysis also confirmed that the upper piece and the invisible lower one are authentic and belong to one and the same artifact.

In 1960, the sword was broken in an attempted theft. It was repaired and fixed in place with cement.

In a season 7 episode of TV series, Forged in Fire, bladesmiths recreated "Excalibur", a medieval broadsword believed to be inspired by Galgano's story. An episode of Ancient X-Files examined the sword in the stone and the connections between it, St. Galgano, Sir Gawain, and King Arthur.

== See also ==
- King Arthur
- Excalibur
