= Abbey of San Galgano =

Cistercian monastery in Tuscany, Italy

Abbey of San Galgano Abbazia di San Galgano (in Italian)
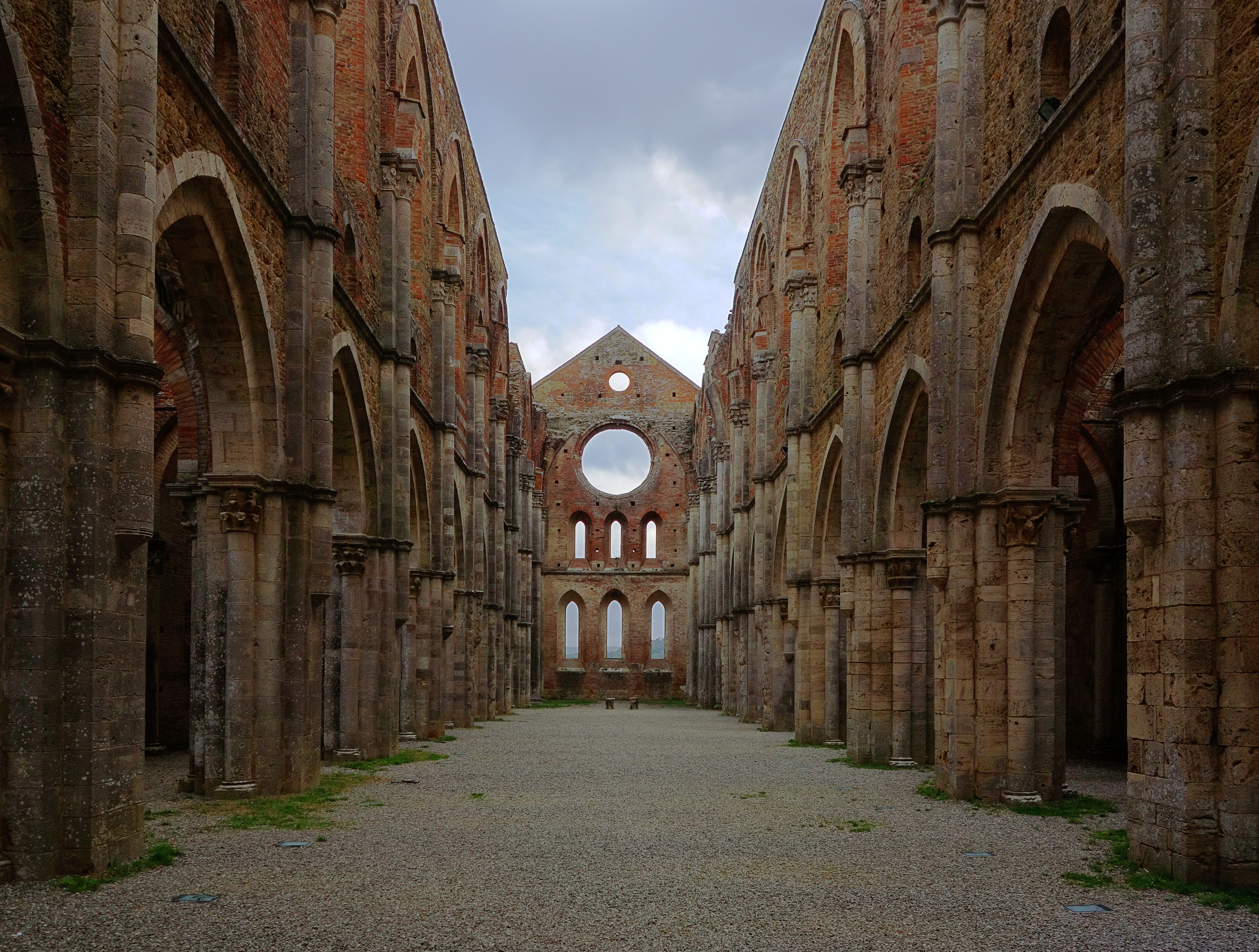
- Interior of the abbey

Religion
- Affiliation: Catholic
- Province: Archdiocese of Siena-Colle di Val d'Elsa-Montalcino
- Rite: Roman Rite

Location
- Location: Chiusdino, Tuscany, Italy
- Interactive map of Abbey of San Galgano; Abbazia di San Galgano (in Italian)
- Coordinates: 43°8′57.87″N 11°9′20.26″E

Architecture
- Style: Italian Gothic
- Groundbreaking: 1218

The Abbey of Saint Galgano was a Cistercian Monastery founded in the valley of the river Merse between the towns of Chiusdino and Monticiano, in the province of Siena, region of Tuscany, Italy. Presently, the roofless walls of the Gothic style 13th-century Abbey church still stand.

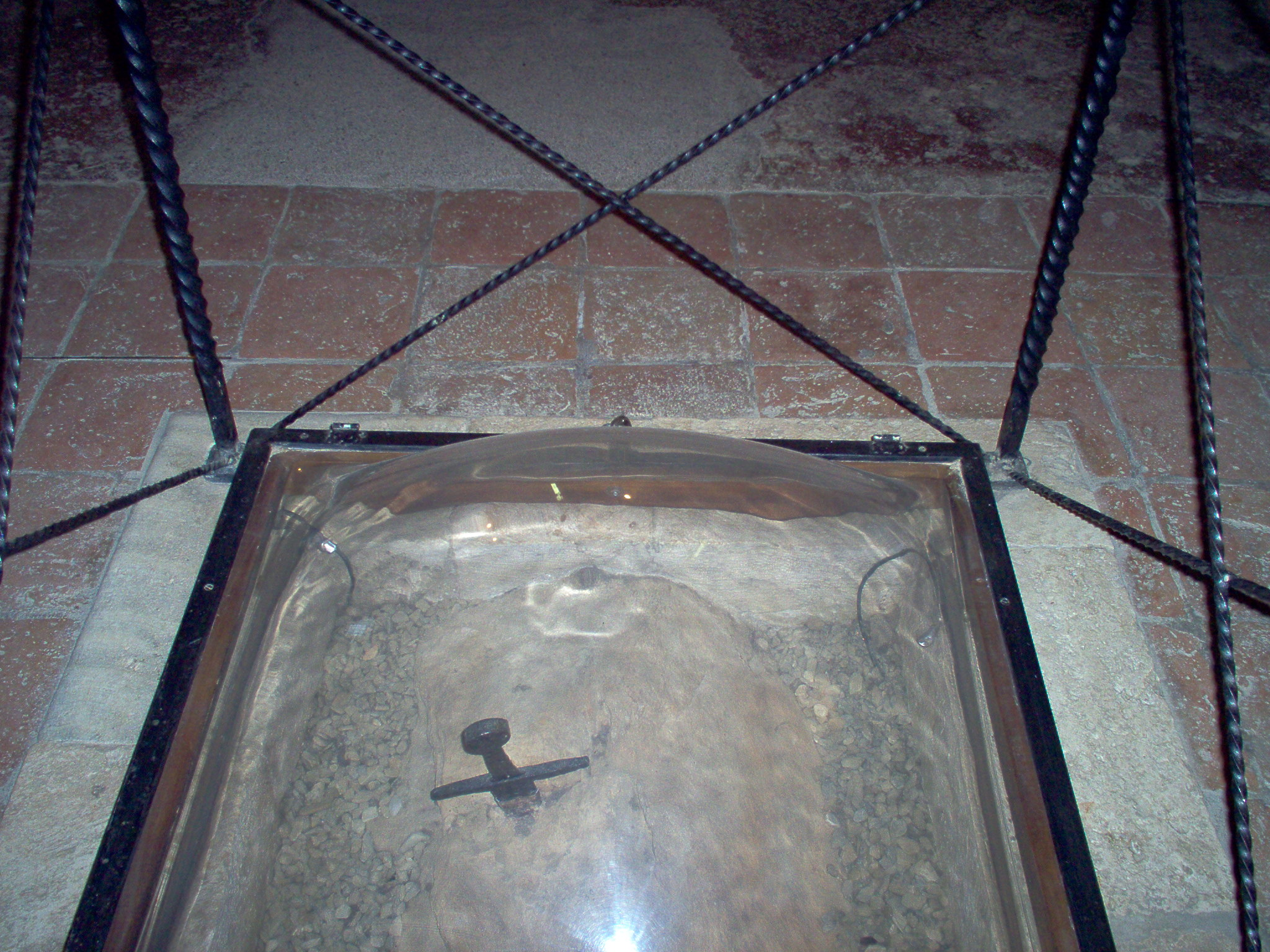
San Galgano sword in the stone at Eremo di Montesiepi

Nearby are the chapel or Eremo or Rotonda di Montesiepi (1185), the tomb of Saint Galgano and the purported site of his death in 1181, a sword said to have been driven into a stone by Galgano, and a chapel with frescoes by Ambrogio Lorenzetti.

== History ==
The abbey formed around the site of the former hermitage of Galgano Guidotti (San Galgano), and construction of the church began around 1220, and was completed some six decades later. The abbey grew in wealth and became allied with the Republic of Siena. Monks from the abbey routinely served as Camarlinghi di Biccherna, i.e. high magistrates of the main financial institution of the republic.

However within a century, the republic failed to protect it from roving condottieri, and John Hawkwood and his men despoiled the monastery beginning in 1363. By the end of the 14th century, only the abbot remained in the monastery.

The abbey stayed impoverished and kept decaying for nearly four centuries. Cardinal Giuseppe Maria Feroni was abbot from 1765 to 1767. In 1786, the campanile fell, taking with it the roof of the church. The ruins were looted. Some restorations occurred in the 19th and 20th centuries, but the church remains a ruin. The long tall nave with its windows and an apse rose window still stand. The abbey's chapter house and part of the scriptorium also remain.

The Rotonda chapel was restored in 1924 and retains its peculiar medieval shape, similar to earlier Ancient Roman mausoleums.

== Popular culture ==
The abbey was the location where parts of Andrei Tarkovsky's 1983 film Nostalghia were shot.

== Gallery ==
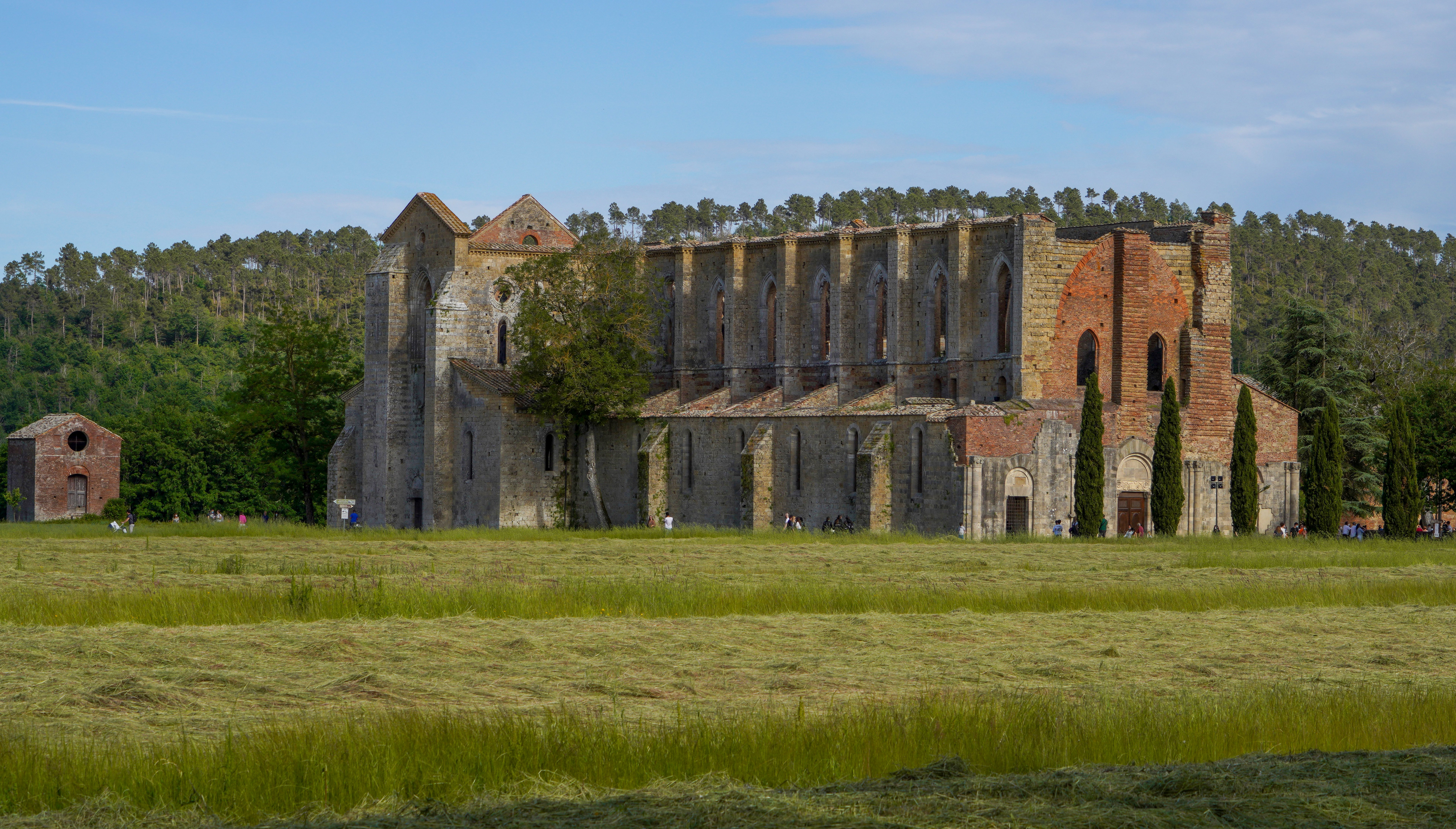
Exterior view

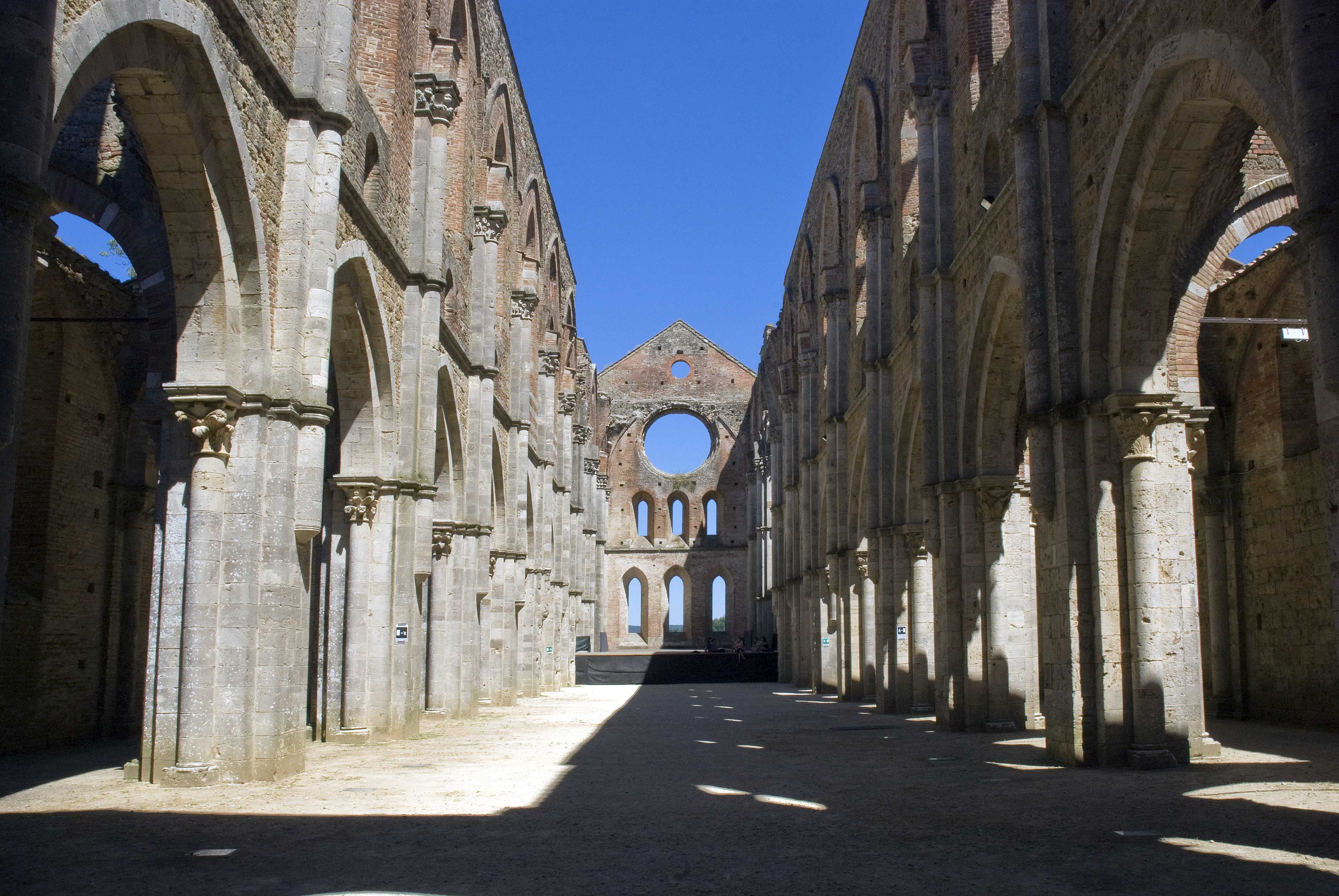
Interior view

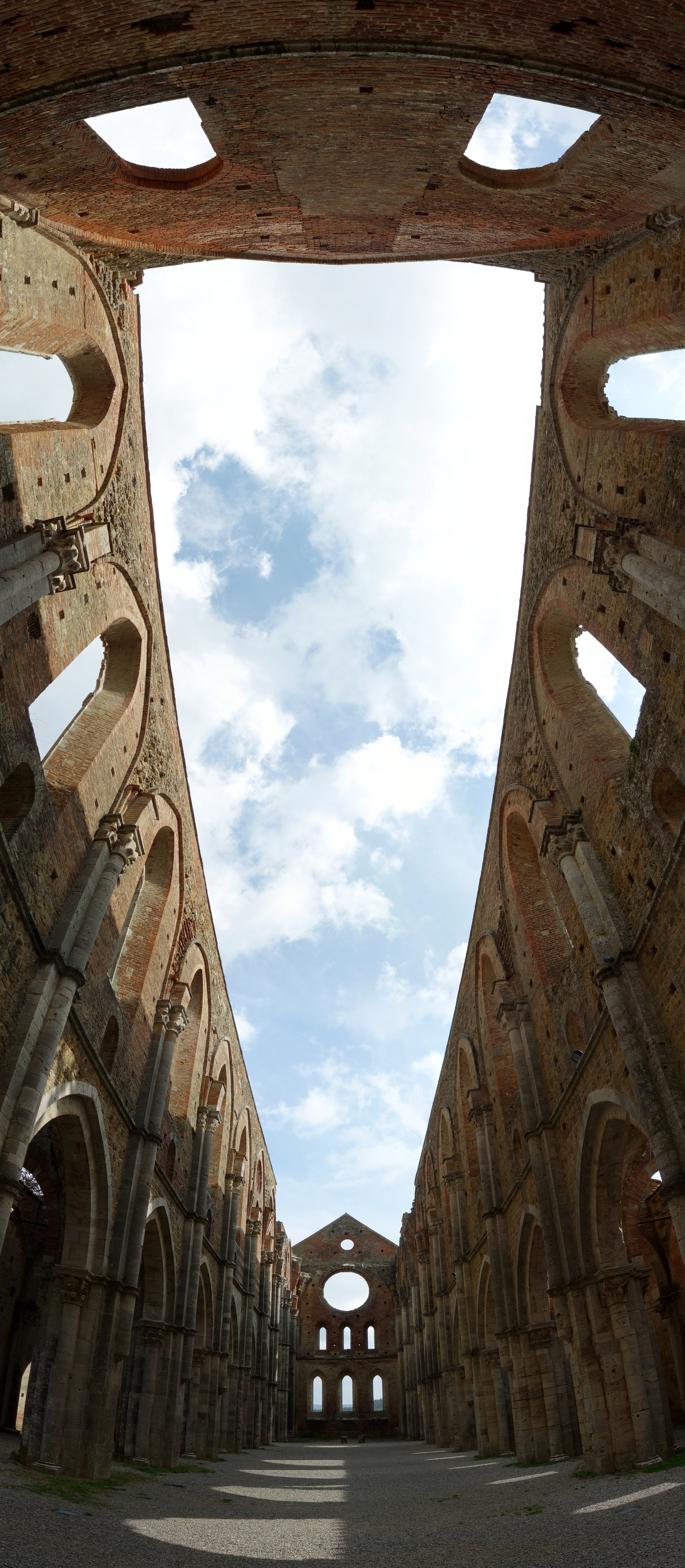
Interior view from the western end

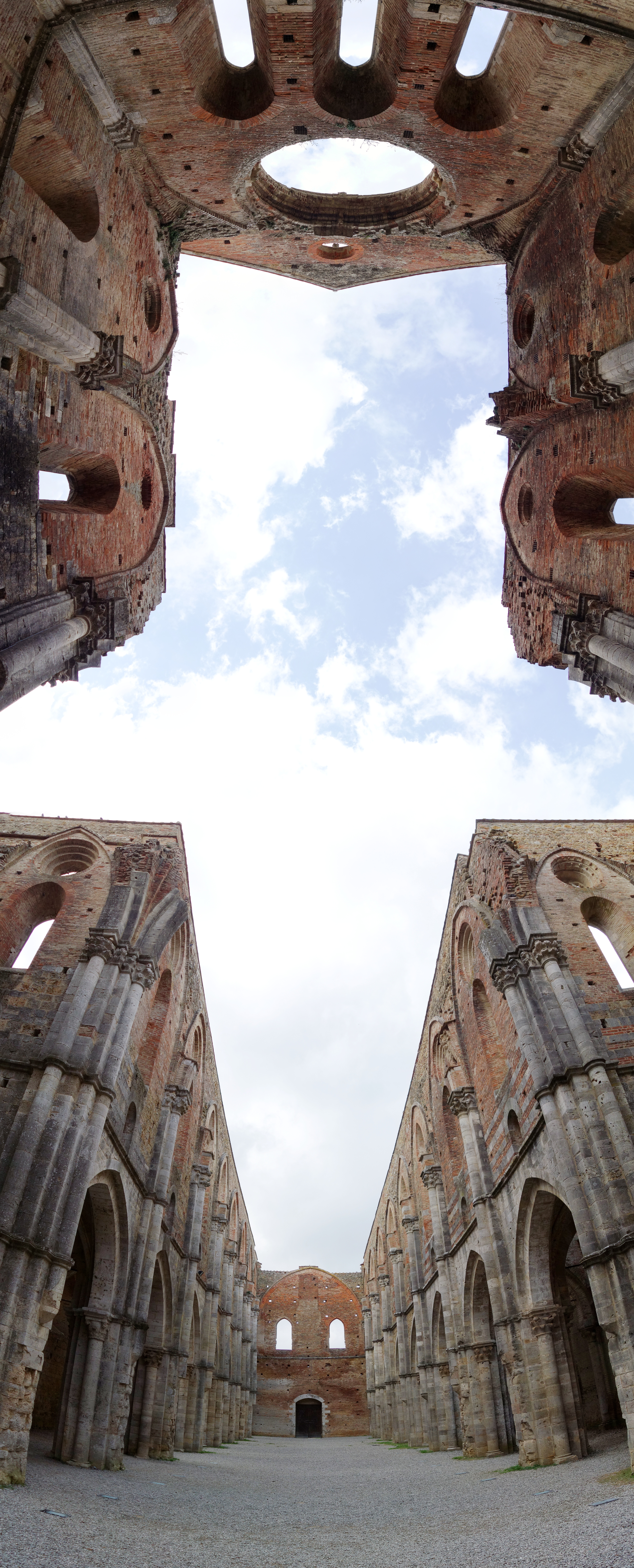
Interior view from the eastern end

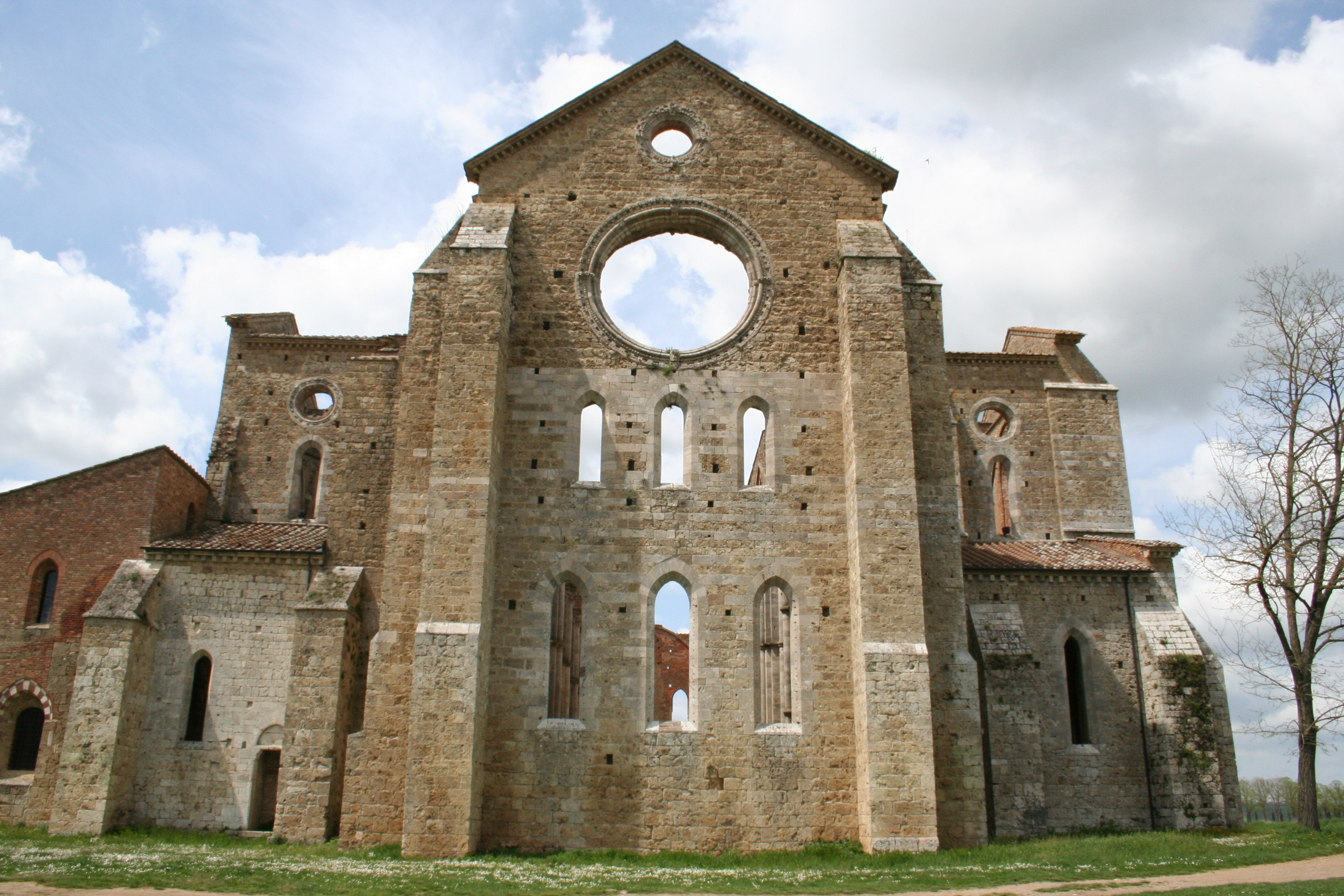
Exterior of the apse

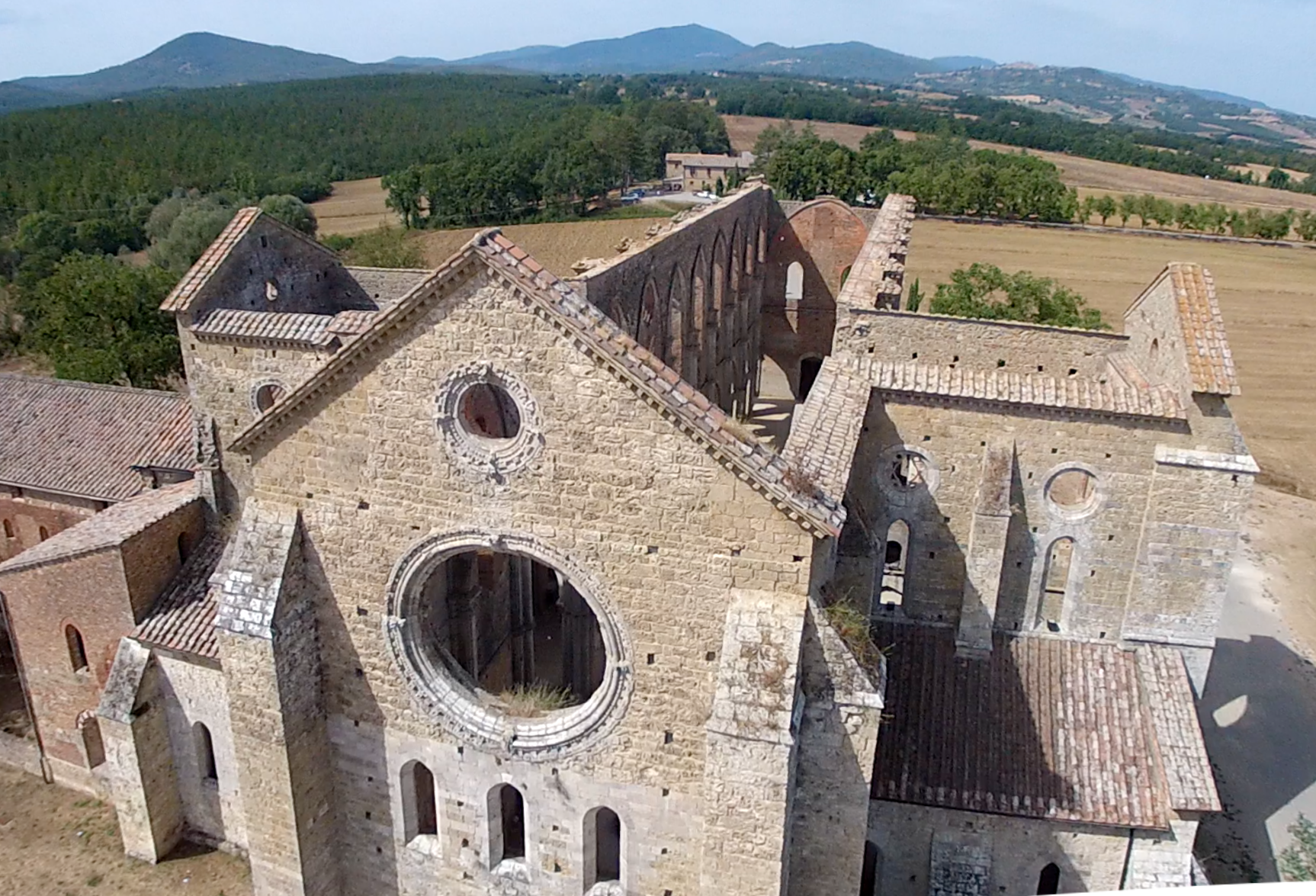
View from above

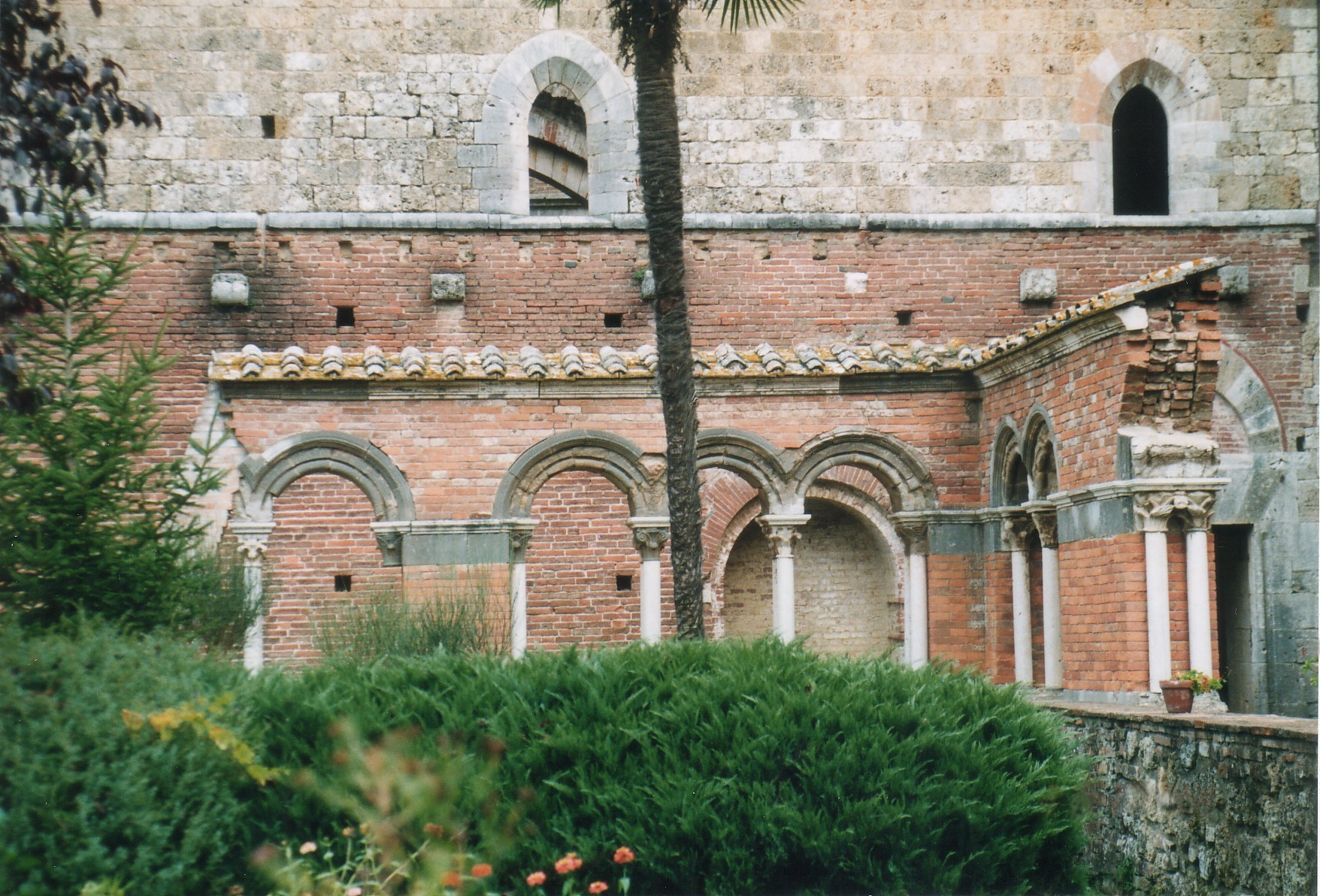
The cloister

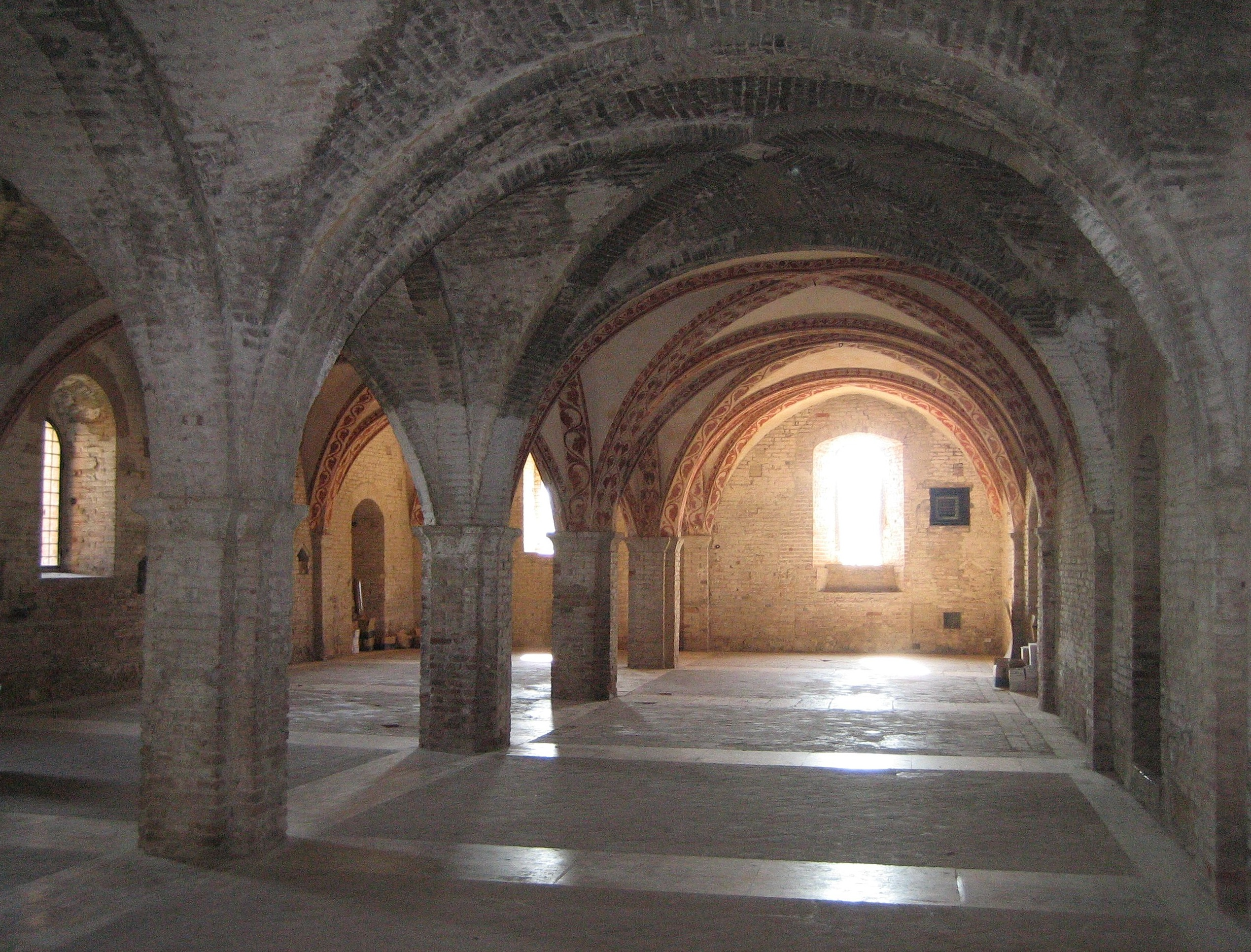
The Scriptorium

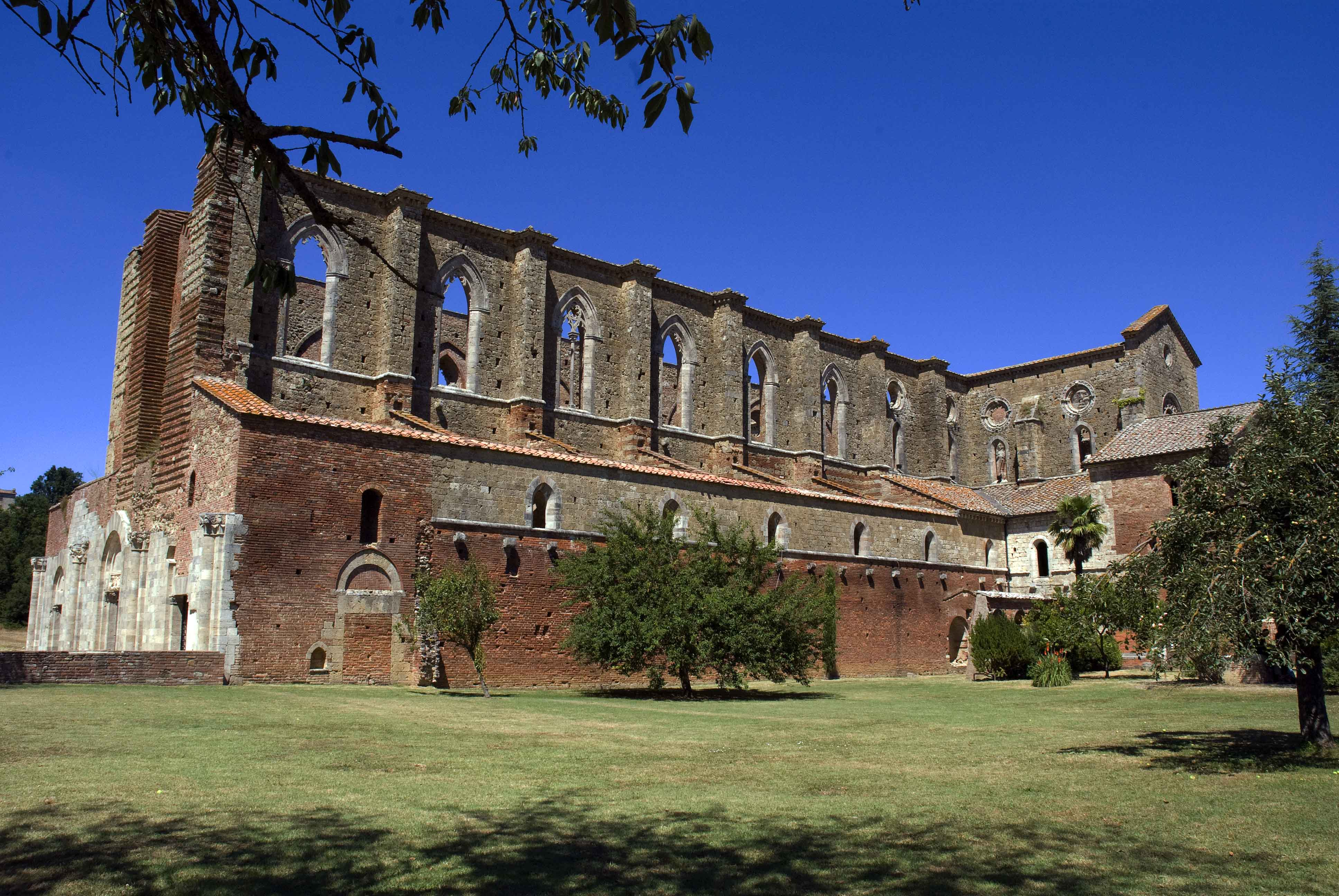
Exterior view (right)

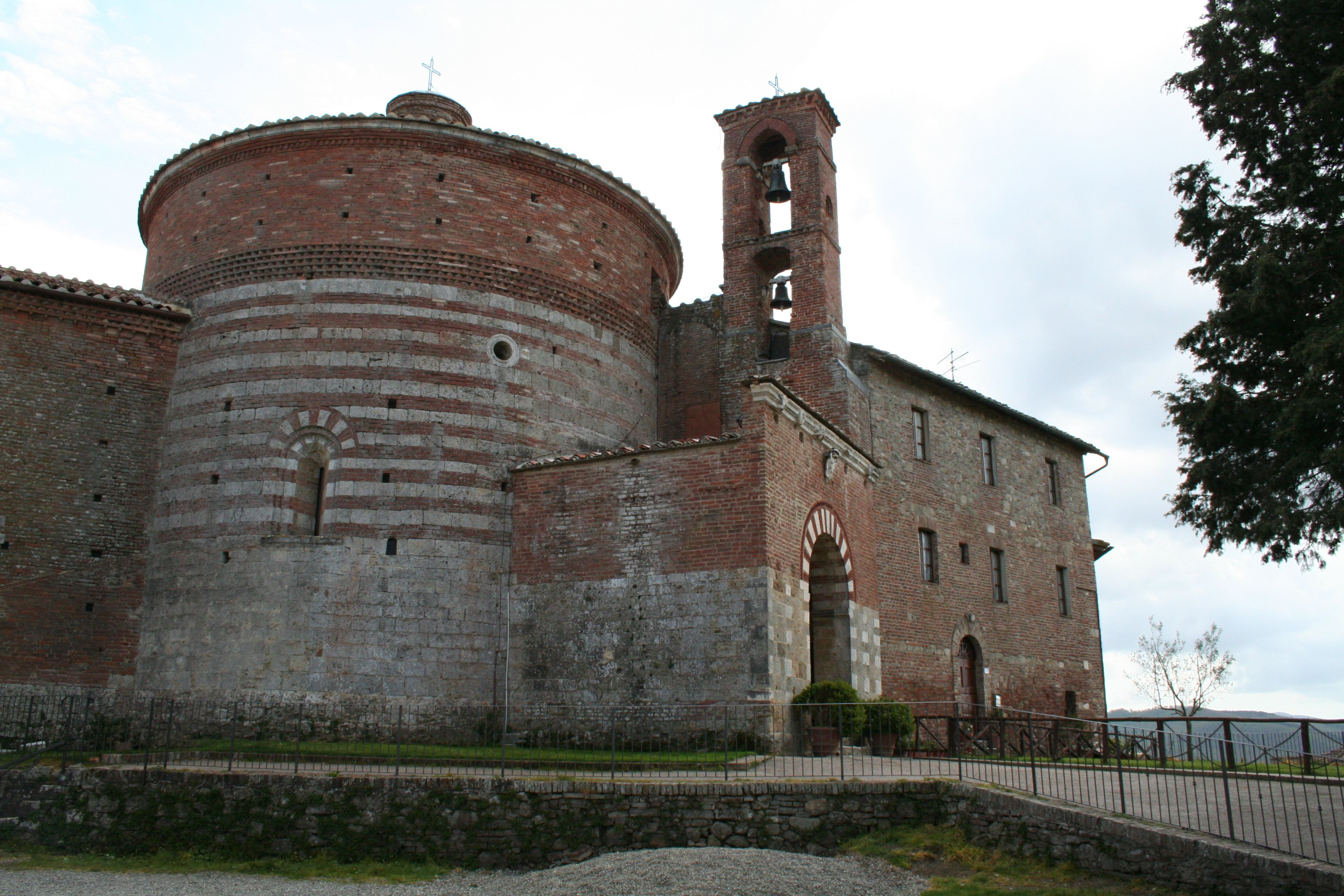
Eremo di Montesiepi

== See also ==
- High medieval domes
