= San Lorenzo a Merse =

- Frazione
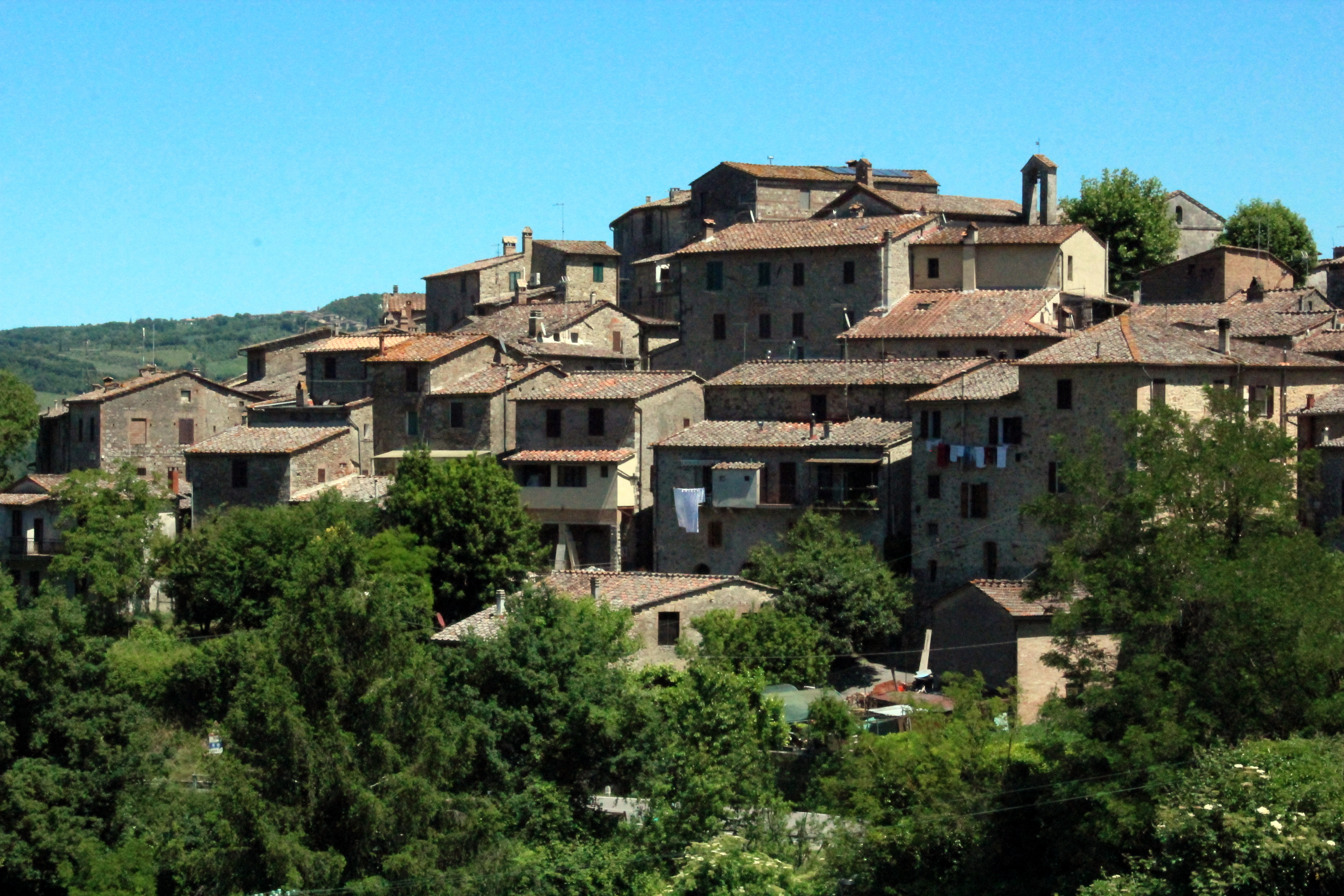
- View of San Lorenzo a Merse

- Location of San Lorenzo a Merse in Italy
- Coordinates: 43°8′50″N 11°16′18″E
- Country: Italy
- Region: Tuscany
- Province: Siena (SI)
- Comune: Monticiano
- Elevation: 227 m (745 ft)

Population (2011)
  - Total: 164
- Demonym: Sanlorenzini
- Time zone: UTC+1 (CET)
  - Summer (DST): UTC+2 (CEST)

San Lorenzo a Merse is a village in Tuscany, central Italy, administratively a frazione of the comune of Monticiano, province of Siena. At the time of the 2001 census its population was 164.
