= Frassini =

- Frazione
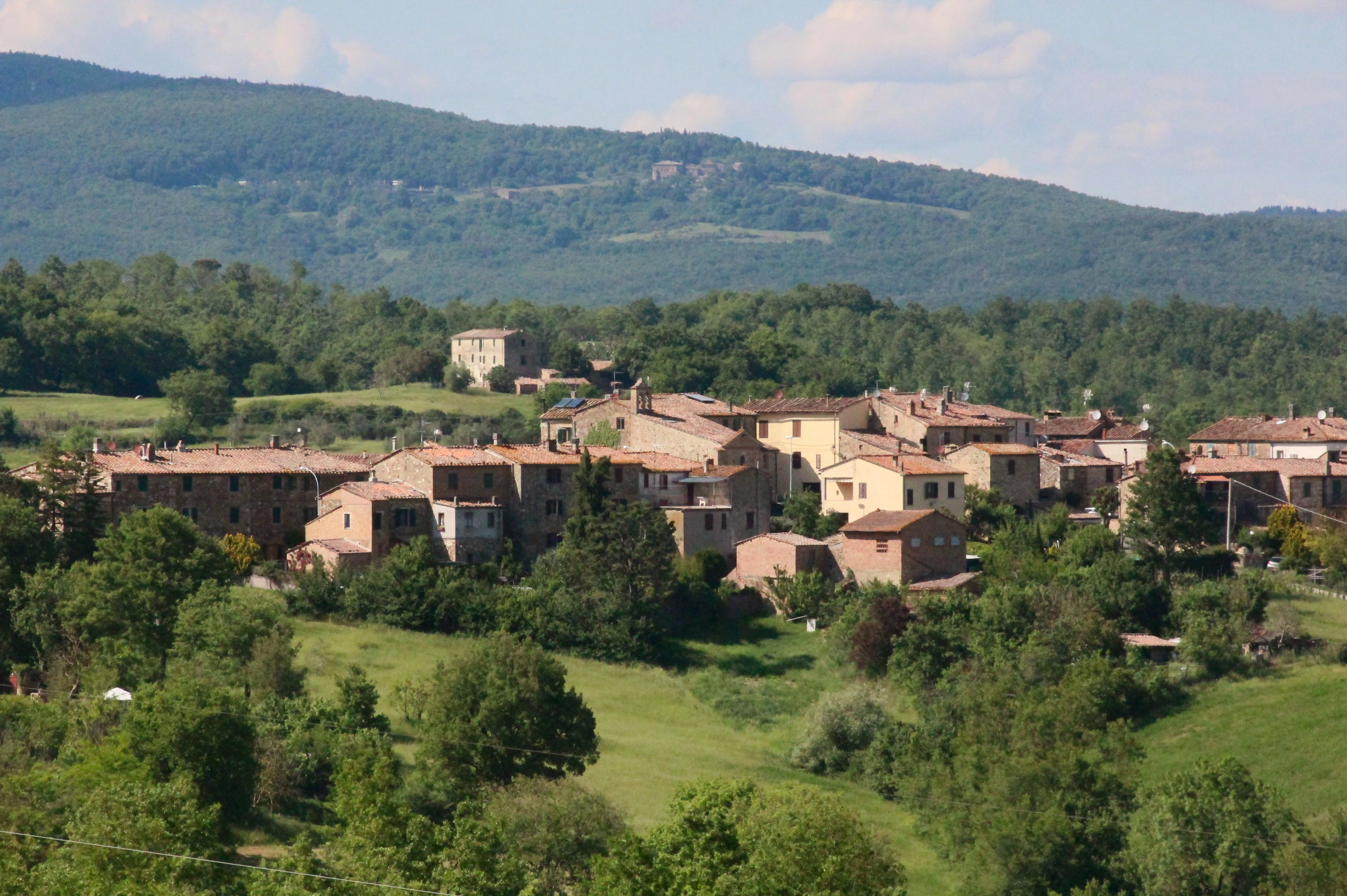
- View of Frassini

- Location of Frassini in Italy
- Coordinates: 43°10′30″N 11°6′59″E
- Country: Italy
- Region: Tuscany
- Province: Siena (SI)
- Comune: Chiusdino
- Elevation: 350 m (1,150 ft)

Population (2011)
  - Total: 167
- Demonym: Frassinai
- Time zone: UTC+1 (CET)
  - Summer (DST): UTC+2 (CEST)

Frassini is a village in Tuscany, central Italy, administratively a frazione of the comune of Chiusdino, province of Siena. At the time of the 2001 census its population was 157.
