= Tocchi =

- Frazione
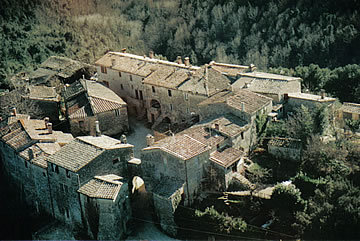
- View of the castle of Tocchi

- Location of Tocchi in Italy
- Coordinates: 43°7′58″N 11°15′42″E
- Country: Italy
- Region: Tuscany
- Province: Siena (SI)
- Comune: Monticiano
- Elevation: 383 m (1,257 ft)

Population (2011)
  - Total: 36
- Demonym: Tocchiani
- Time zone: UTC+1 (CET)
  - Summer (DST): UTC+2 (CEST)

Tocchi is a village in Tuscany, central Italy, administratively a frazione of the comune of Monticiano, province of Siena. At the time of the 2001 census its population was 28.
