= Frosini =

- Frazione
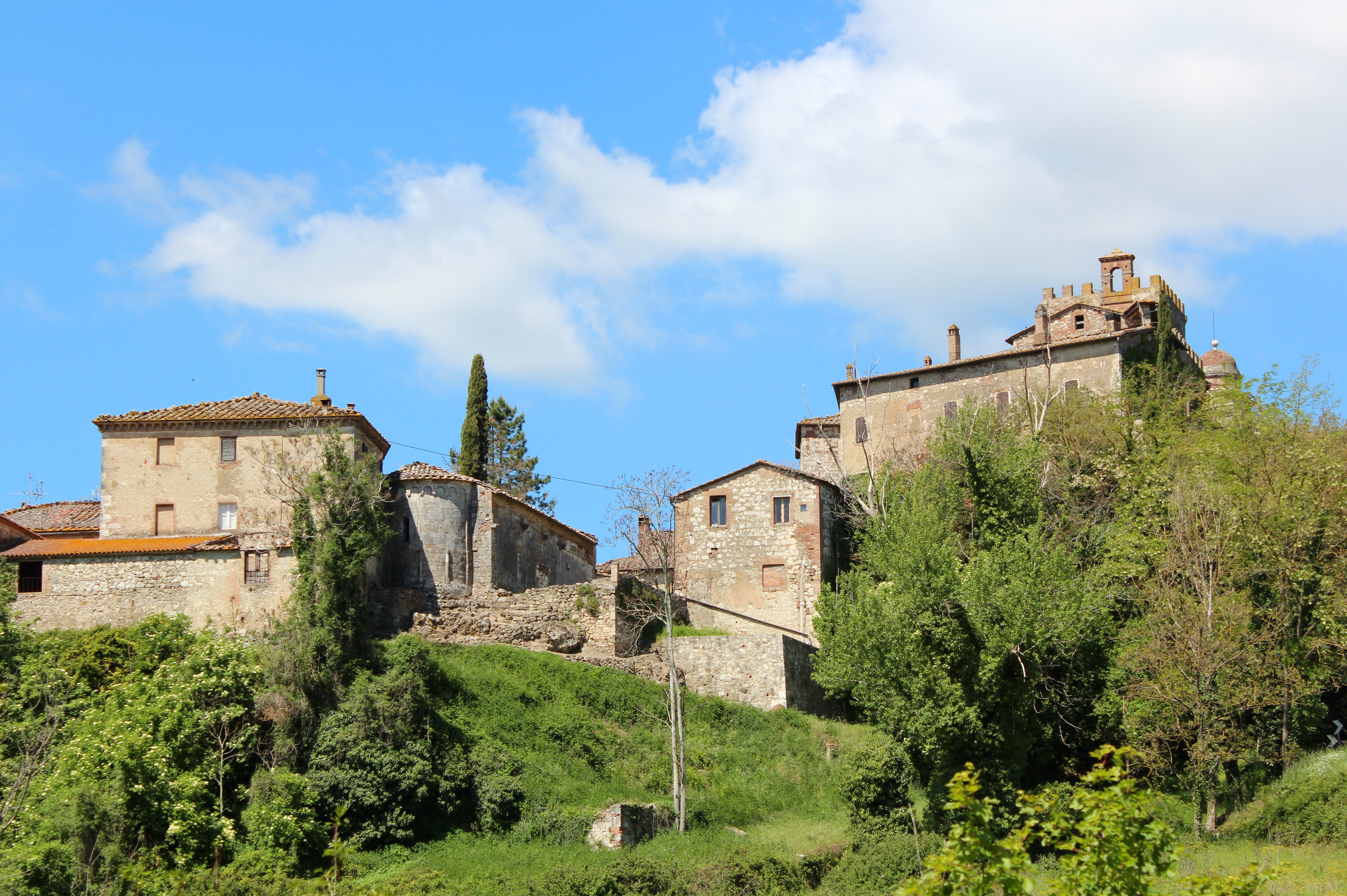
- View of Frosini

- Location of Frosini in Italy
- Coordinates: 43°12′19″N 11°8′52″E
- Country: Italy
- Region: Tuscany
- Province: Siena (SI)
- Comune: Chiusdino
- Elevation: 346 m (1,135 ft)

Population (2011)
  - Total: 31
- Time zone: UTC+1 (CET)
  - Summer (DST): UTC+2 (CEST)

Frosini is a village in Tuscany, central Italy, administratively a frazione of the comune of Chiusdino, province of Siena. At the time of the 2001 census its population was 45.
