= Val di Merse =

Valley in Tuscany, Italy

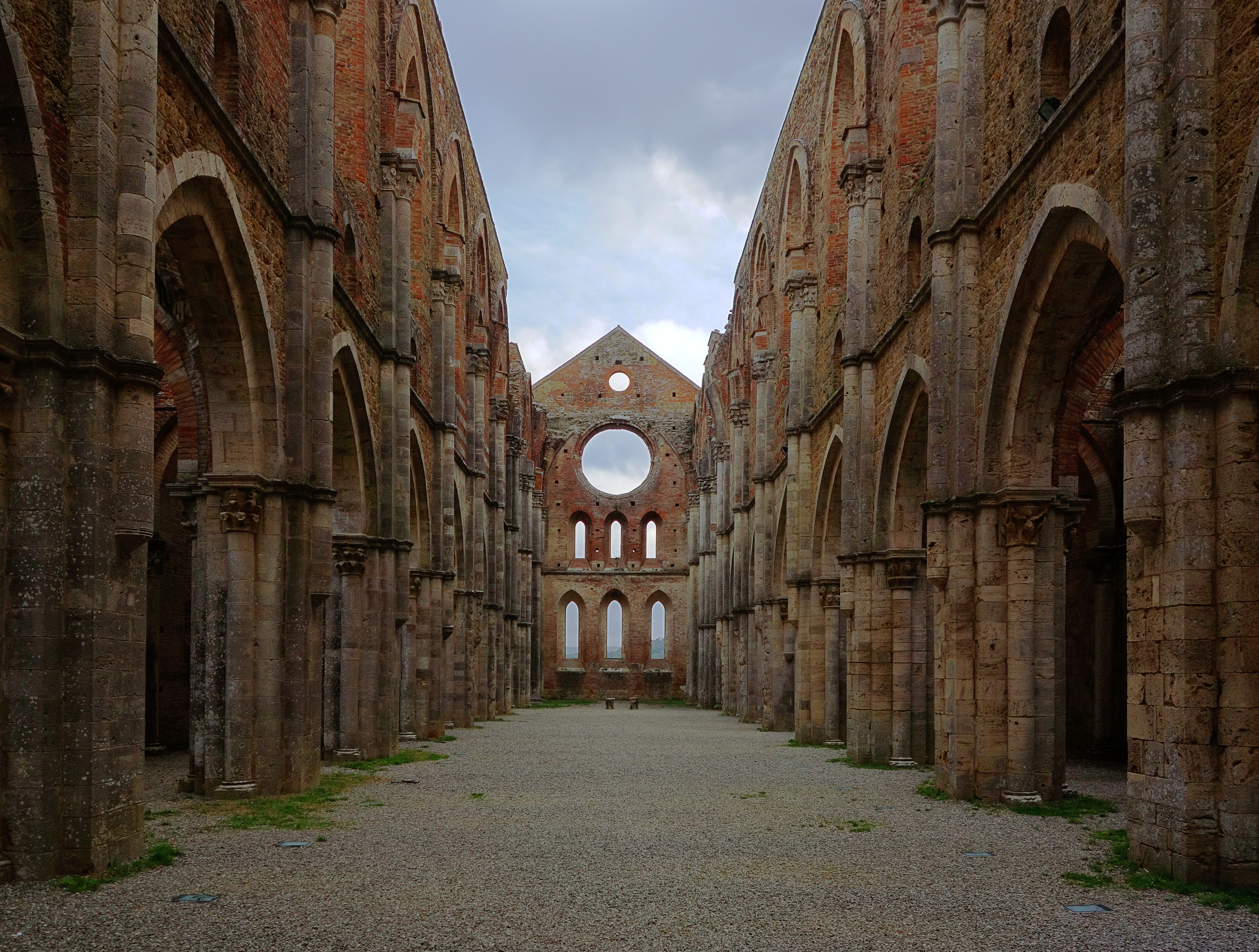
The Abbey of San Galgano, in Val di Merse

Val di Merse is one of the regions of the province of Siena, in Tuscany, on the border with the Upper Maremma. The territory comprises the area between the rivers Farma and Merse.

Villages in the region include Chiusdino, best known for the Abbey of San Galgano and the sword in the stone, Monticiano, which is surrounded by the Nature Reserves of Alto Merse and Farma and presents the Church of St. Augustine, Murlo and Sovicille. The hot springs of Bagni di Petriolo are also in the region.

Athletes based at Tuscany Camp often train at Val di Merse.
