= Palazzetto, Chiusdino =

Palazzetto
- Frazione
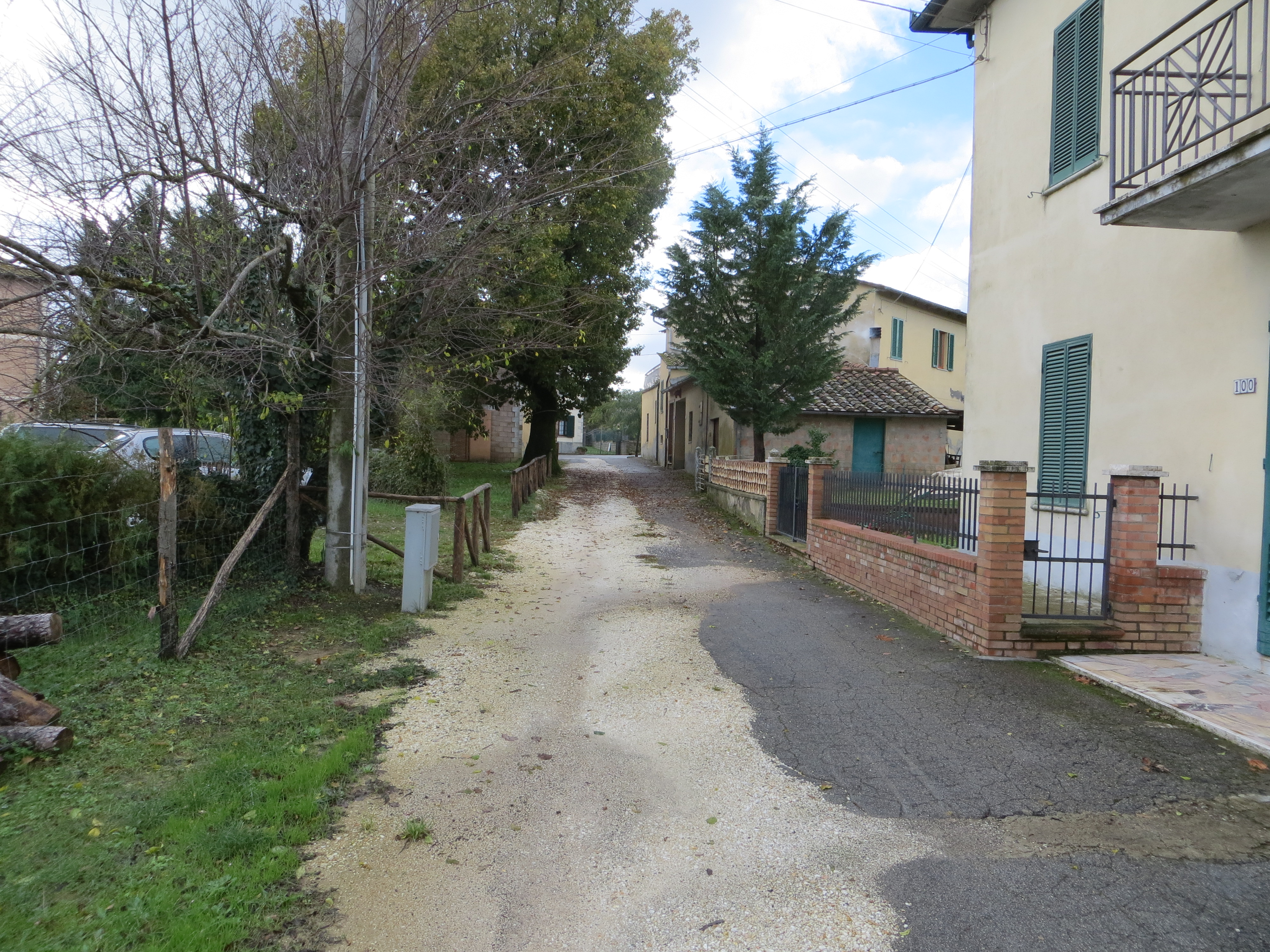

- Location of Palazzetto in Italy
- Coordinates: 43°8′34″N 11°7′26″E
- Country: Italy
- Region: Tuscany
- Province: Siena (SI)
- Comune: Chiusdino
- Elevation: 347 m (1,138 ft)

Population (2011)
  - Total: 117
- Demonym: Palazzettini
- Time zone: UTC+1 (CET)
  - Summer (DST): UTC+2 (CEST)

Palazzetto is a village in Tuscany, central Italy, administratively a frazione of the comune of Chiusdino, province of Siena. At the time of the 2001 census its population was 100.
