= Merse (river) =

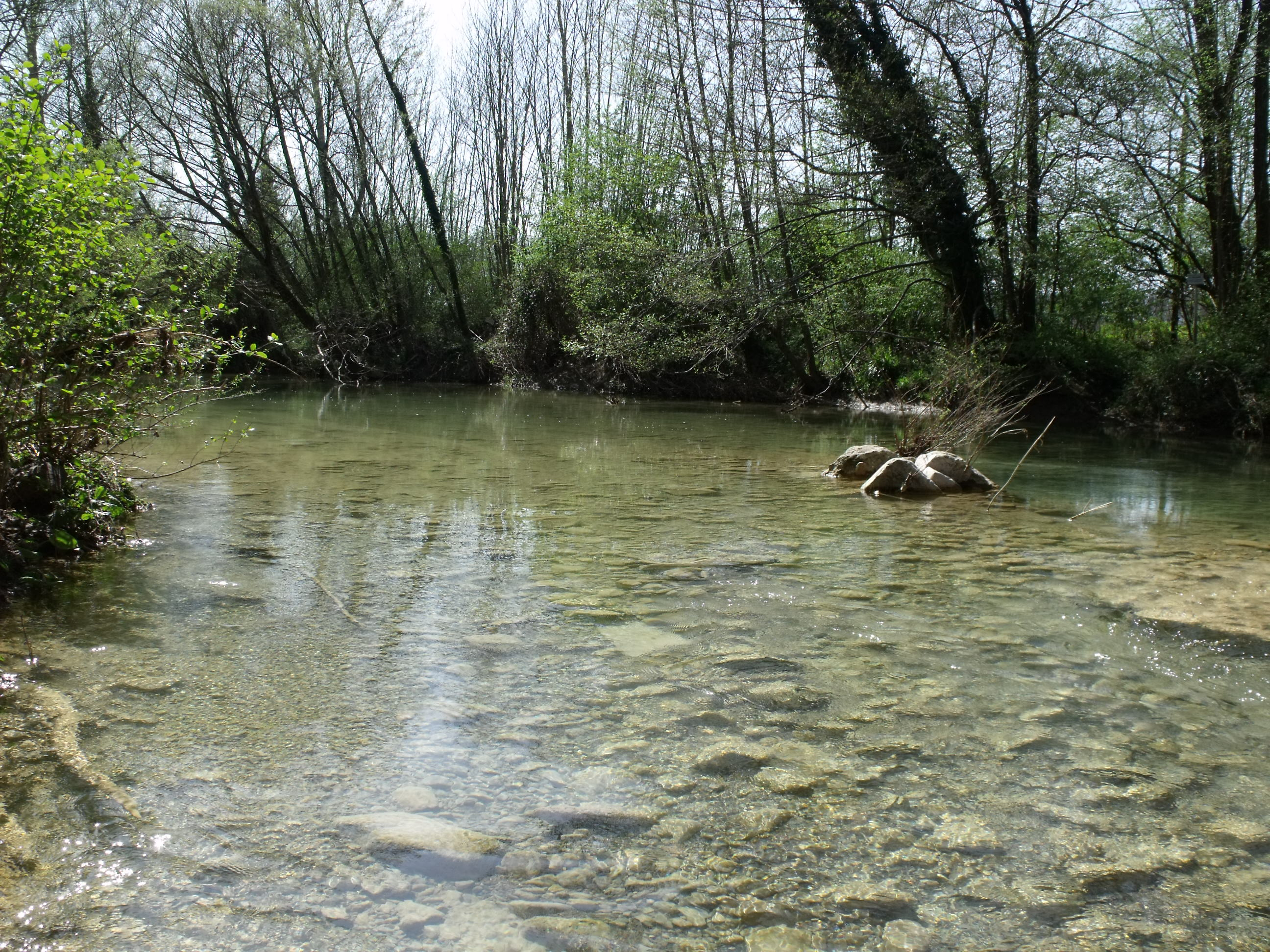

Location
- Country: Italy

Physical characteristics
- Source
  - location: Poggio Croce di Prata and Poggio di Montieri (Colline Metallifere)
  - elevation: 848 m (2,782 ft)
- Mouth: Ombrone
  - location: near Bagni di Petriolo
  - coordinates: 43.0761°N 11.3639°E
- Length: c. 70 km (43 mi)

Basin features
- Progression: Ombrone→ Tyrrhenian Sea

The Merse is an Italian river, a right tributary of the Ombrone. It runs through Tuscany for a distance of about 70 km and is the river of the Val di Merse.

Its sources are near Poggio Croce di Prata and Poggio di Montieri in the range of hills known as the Colline Metallifere. From here it takes a north-easterly direction for the first half of its course before turning sharply to the south-east. At Pontiella it receives from the right the waters of the Farma, a torrent born at Torniella, again in the Colline Metallifere). After a few kilometres the Merse enters the Ombrone at Pian di Rocca which lies half-way between the spa of Bagni di Petriolo to the west and Castiglione del Bosco to the east.

The river has recently suffered from sulphurous pollutants deriving from the old and neglected mine-workings in the upper part of its course. Fish are far less plentiful than in the past, which may be put down to the exploitation of its waters for irrigation during the summer months; nevertheless there are many cyprinids, and pike are also found.

The white mill which gives its name to the Mulino Bianco biscuit manufacturers is located on the upper course of the river: it was constructed in the early 13th century by monks from the nearby abbey of Serena.
