= Scalvaia =

- Frazione
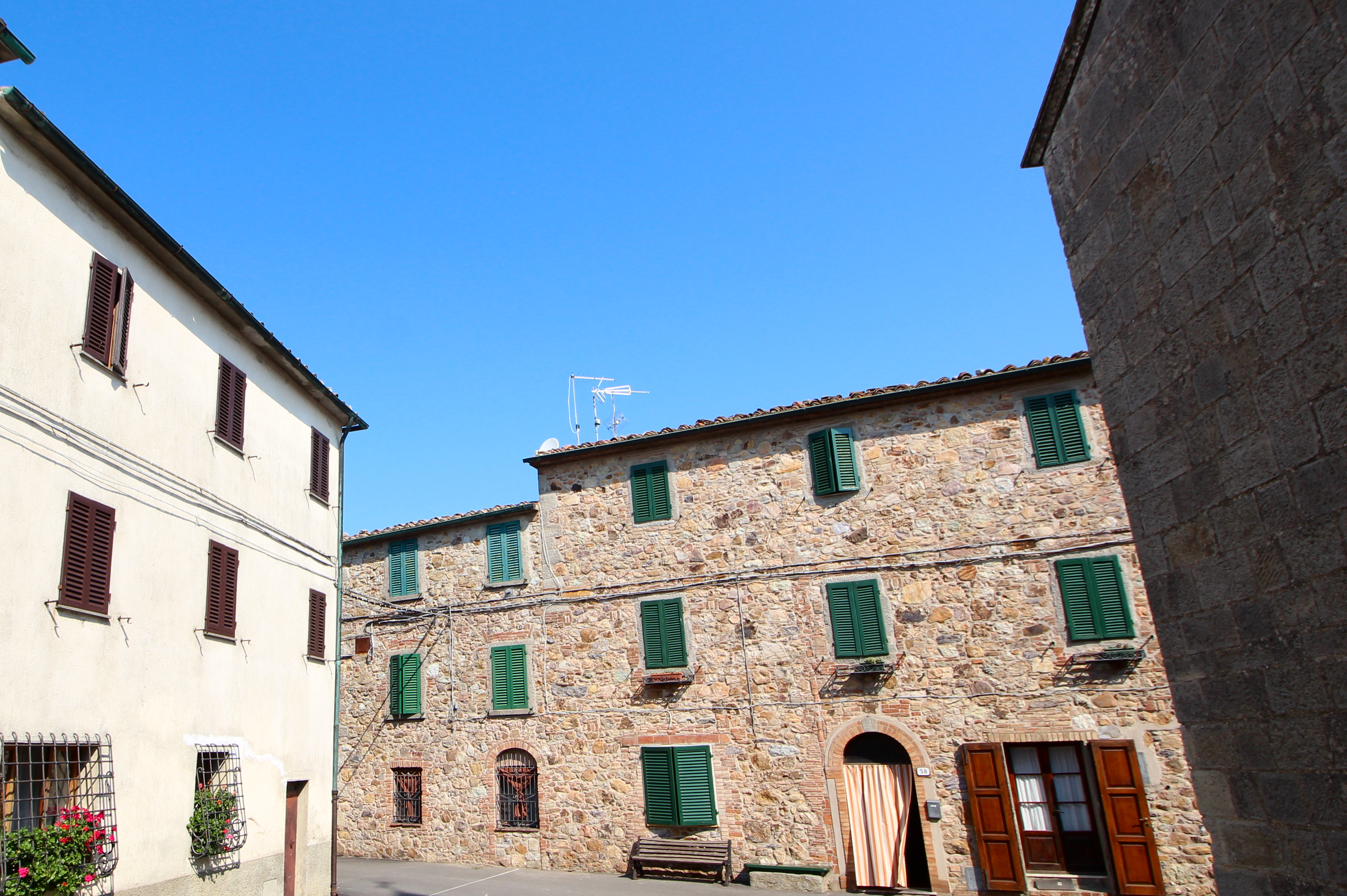

- Location of Scalvaia in Italy
- Coordinates: 43°5′18″N 11°9′7″E
- Country: Italy
- Region: Tuscany
- Province: Siena (SI)
- Comune: Monticiano
- Elevation: 489 m (1,604 ft)

Population (2011)
  - Total: 71
- Demonym: Scalvaiesi
- Time zone: UTC+1 (CET)
  - Summer (DST): UTC+2 (CEST)

Scalvaia is a village in Tuscany, central Italy, administratively a frazione of the comune of Monticiano, province of Siena. At the time of the 2001 census its population was 71.
