= Iesa, Monticiano =

Iesa
- Frazione
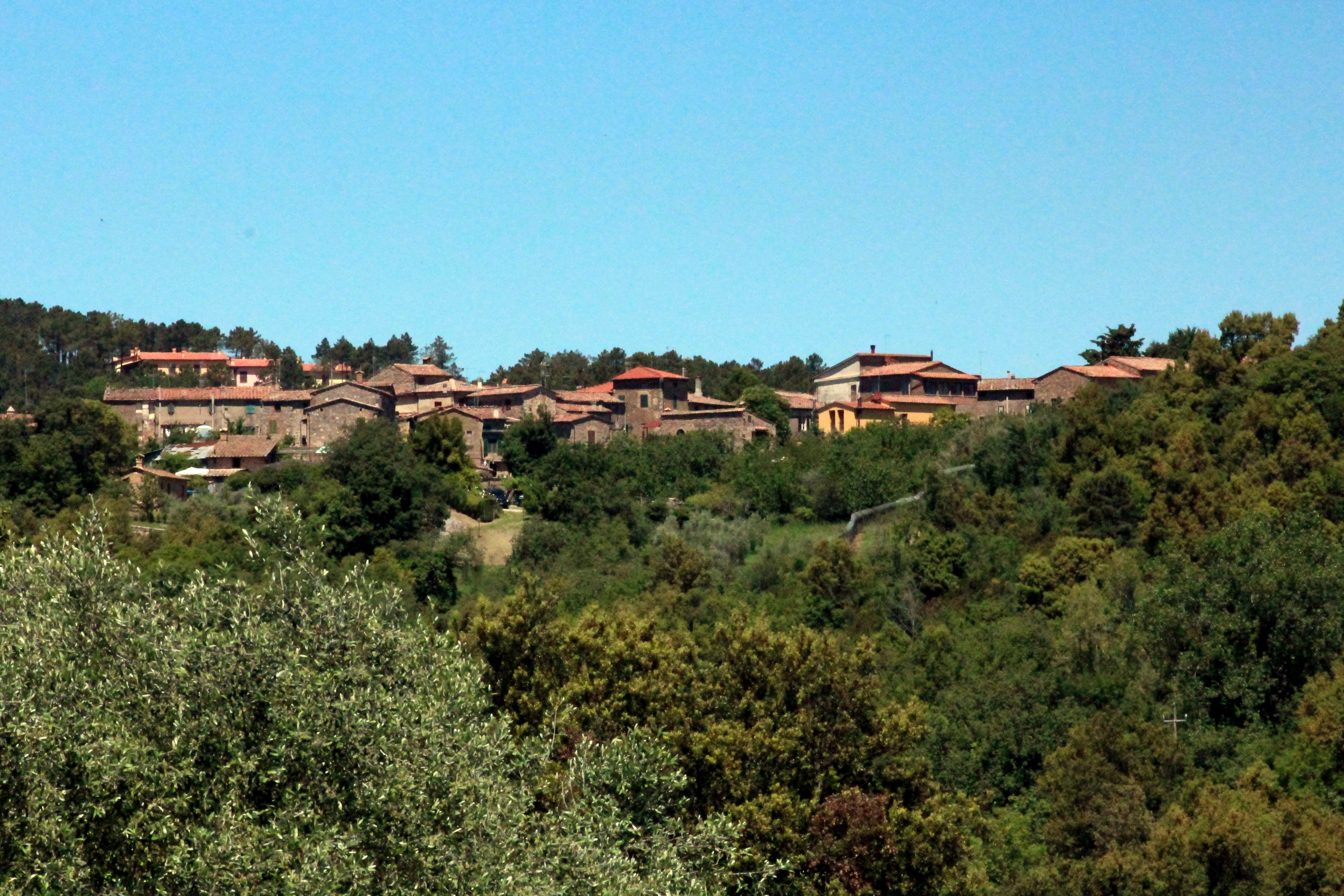
- View of Iesa

- Location of Iesa in Italy
- Coordinates: 43°5′58″N 11°15′00″E
- Country: Italy
- Region: Tuscany
- Province: Siena (SI)
- Comune: Monticiano
- Elevation: 432 m (1,417 ft)

Population (2011)
  - Total: 146
- Demonym: Iesattoli
- Time zone: UTC+1 (CET)
  - Summer (DST): UTC+2 (CEST)

Iesa is a village in Tuscany, central Italy, administratively a frazione of the comune of Monticiano, province of Siena. At the time of the 2001 census its population was 146.

The village is formed by the hamlets of Cerbaia, Contra, Lama, Palazzo, Quarciglioni and Solaia.
