= Ciciano =

- Frazione
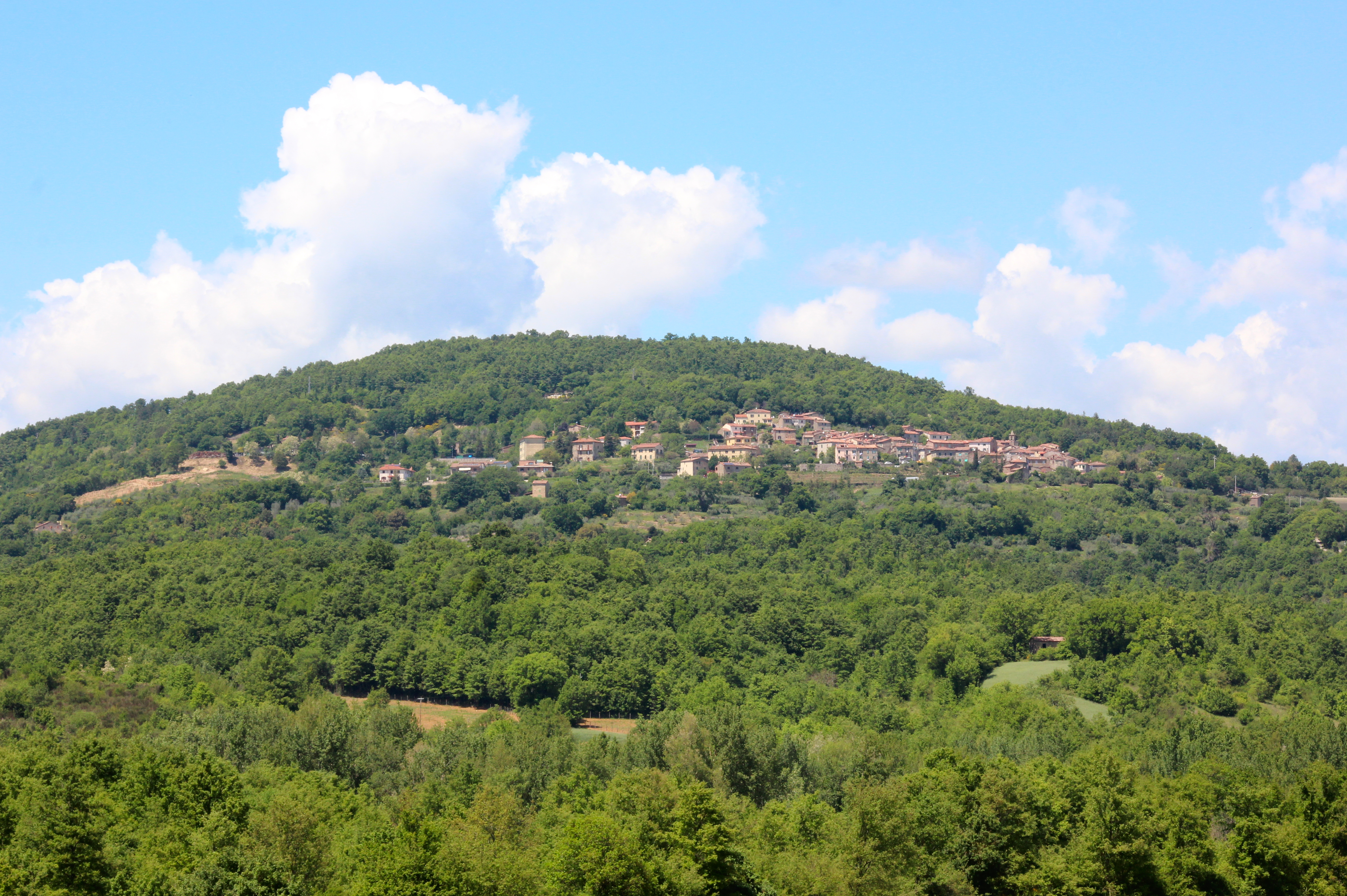
- View of Ciciano

- Location of Ciciano in Italy
- Coordinates: 43°8′28″N 11°4′16″E
- Country: Italy
- Region: Tuscany
- Province: Siena (SI)
- Comune: Chiusdino
- Elevation: 506 m (1,660 ft)

Population (2011)
  - Total: 310
- Demonym: Cicianesi
- Time zone: UTC+1 (CET)
  - Summer (DST): UTC+2 (CEST)

Ciciano is a village in Tuscany, central Italy, administratively a frazione of the comune of Chiusdino, province of Siena. At the time of the 2001 census its population was 307.
