= Chiusdino =

- Comune
- Comune di Chiusdino
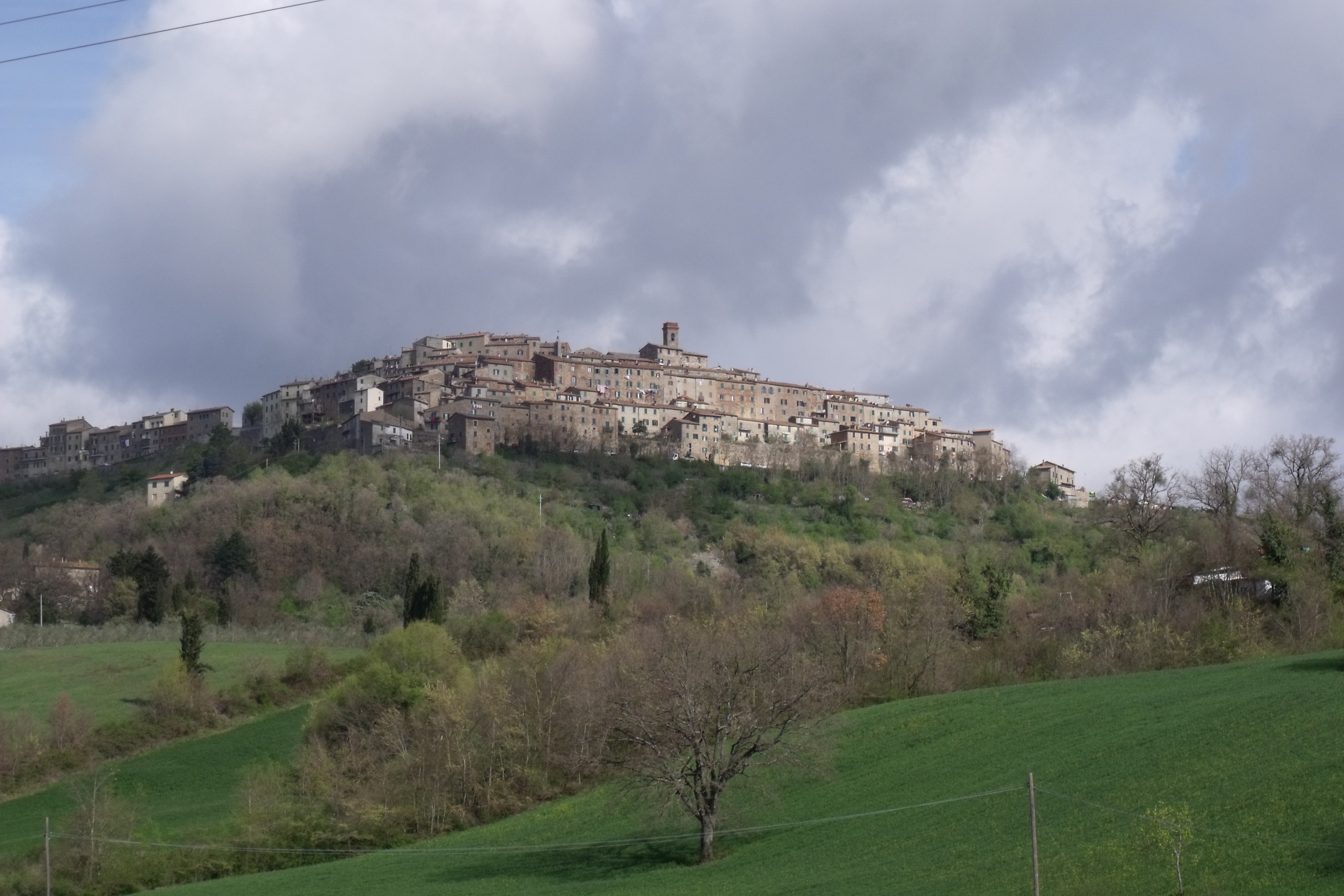

- Coat of arms

- Location within Italy Location within Tuscany
- Coordinates: 43°9′N 11°5′E
- Country: Italy
- Region: Tuscany
- Province: Siena (SI)
- Frazioni: Ciciano, Frassini, Frosini, Montalcinello, Palazzetto

Government
  - Mayor: Luciana Bartaletti

Area
  - Total: 142.62 km^{2} (55.07 sq mi)
- Elevation: 564 m (1,850 ft)

Population (30 June 2017)
  - Total: 1,888
  - Density: 13.24/km^{2} (34.29/sq mi)
- Demonym: Chiusdinesi
- Time zone: UTC+1 (CET)
  - Summer (DST): UTC+2 (CEST)
- Postal code: 53012
- Dialing code: 0577
- Website: Official website

Chiusdino is a comune (municipality) in the Province of Siena in the Italian region Tuscany, located about 70 kilometres (43 mi) south of Florence and about 30 kilometres (19 mi) southwest of Siena.

Chiusdino borders the following municipalities: Casole d'Elsa, Monticiano, Montieri, Radicondoli, Roccastrada, Sovicille.
