= Monticiano =

- Comune
- Comune di Monticiano
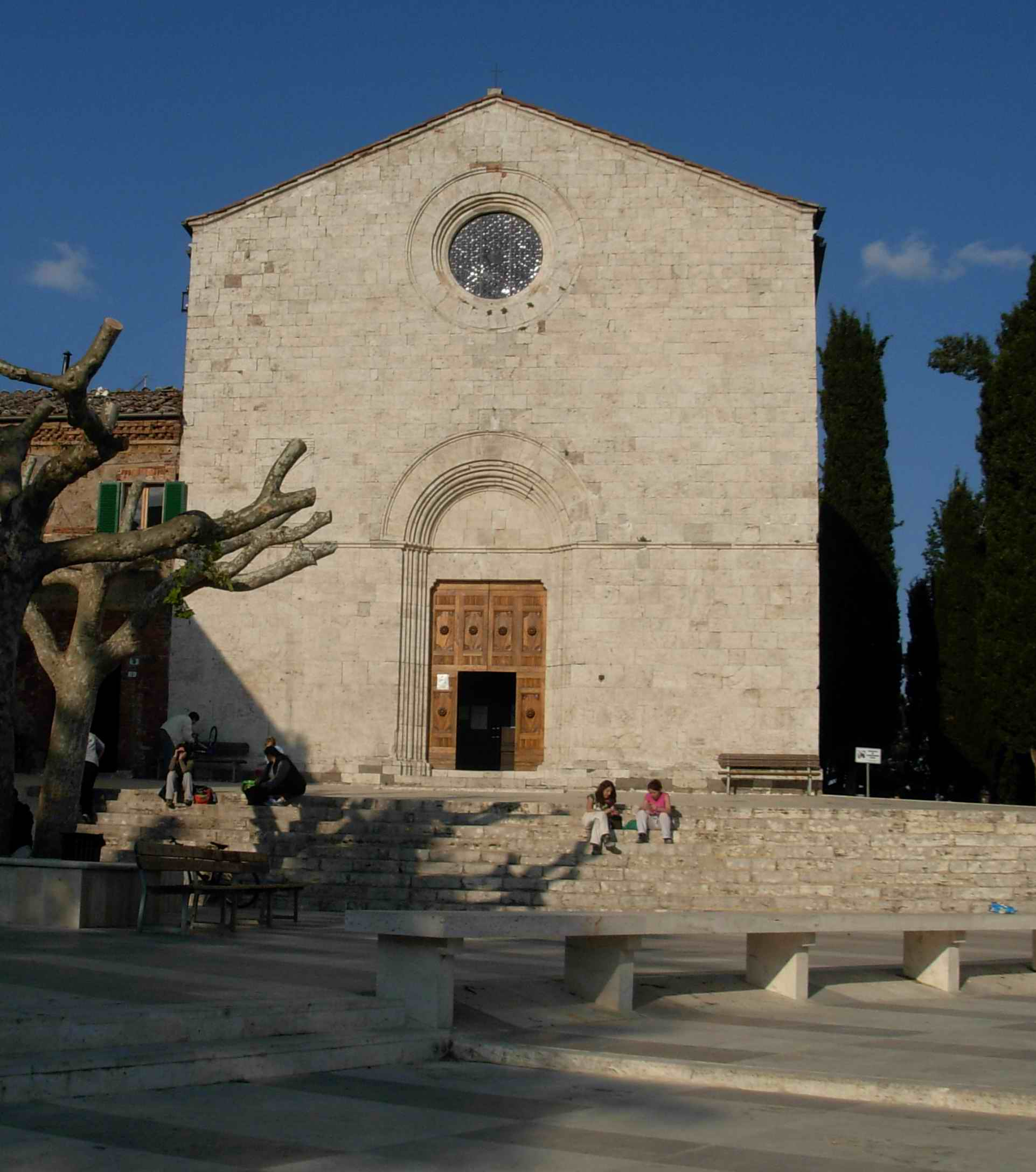

- Coat of arms

- Location within Italy Location within Tuscany
- Coordinates: 43°8′N 11°11′E
- Country: Italy
- Region: Tuscany
- Province: Siena (SI)
- Frazioni: Bagni di Petriolo, Iesa, San Lorenzo a Merse, Scalvaia, Tocchi

Government
  - Mayor: Alessio Serragli

Area
  - Total: 109.5 km^{2} (42.3 sq mi)
- Elevation: 375 m (1,230 ft)

Population (30 November 2017)
  - Total: 1,543
  - Density: 14.09/km^{2} (36.50/sq mi)
- Demonym: Monticianesi
- Time zone: UTC+1 (CET)
  - Summer (DST): UTC+2 (CEST)
- Postal code: 53015
- Dialing code: 0577
- Website: Official website

Monticiano is a town and comune on the right bank of the Val di Merse, Province of Siena, Tuscany, central Italy. The town is situated on the Colline Metallifere. One of its frazioni, Bagni di Petriolo, is popular for its thermal waters.

== History ==
First historical mentions of the "Castle of Monticiano" dates from 1171, when it was under the suzerainty of the bishop of Volterra. During the Medieval period the forests represented an important resource. Not only did they provide wood but also food supplies such as wild game and chestnuts. A system of agriculture quickly grew up around Monticiano, the principal product cultivated being wheat. In 1266, due to its citizens' participation to the Ghibelline defeat at Benevento, it was occupied by the Sienese troops, who destroyed the castle walls. In 1554 it became part of the Grand Duchy of Tuscany. From 1629 to 1749 it was a fief of the Pannocchieschi family.

In 1860, its 723 inhabitants unanimously agreed to join the Kingdom of Italy. During World War II, partisans from the Siena zone started their first organizational operations in Monticiano, where a resistance brigade, named after Spartaco Lavagnini, also operated. The night time battle between the partisans and the Germans on 3–4 June 1944 took place in the town's central piazza and is particularly remembered.

== People ==
Monticiano is the birthplace of former association football director Luciano Moggi and former footballer and coach Carlo Petrini.
