= Gaspero Ciacci =

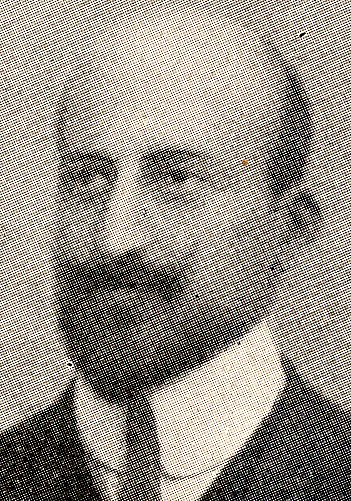

Member of the Chamber of Deputies
- In office 1906–1919
- Constituency: Scansano

Personal details
- Born: 20 April 1873 Pitigliano, Province of Grosseto, Kingdom of Italy
- Died: 15 March 1944 (aged 70) Saturnia, Manciano, Province of Grosseto, Kingdom of Italy
- Occupation: Landowner

Gaspero Ciacci (20 April 1873 – 15 March 1944) was an Italian politician and landowner who served as a member of the Chamber of Deputies of the Kingdom of Italy for three legislatures from 1906 to 1919.

== Life and career ==
Ciacci was born in Pitigliano, in the province of Grosseto. He graduated in law and primarily focused on agriculture, overseeing the reclamation of land and the management of his family's estates between Pitigliano and Manciano.

He was elected to Parliament for three consecutive legislatures from 1906 to 1919. On 9 June 1914, he presented a bill for the establishment of the municipality of Castell'Azzara, separated from Santa Fiora, which was approved on 12 December.

He died in his estate in Saturnia on 15 March 1944.
