= Lago del Tafone =

Lake in Italy

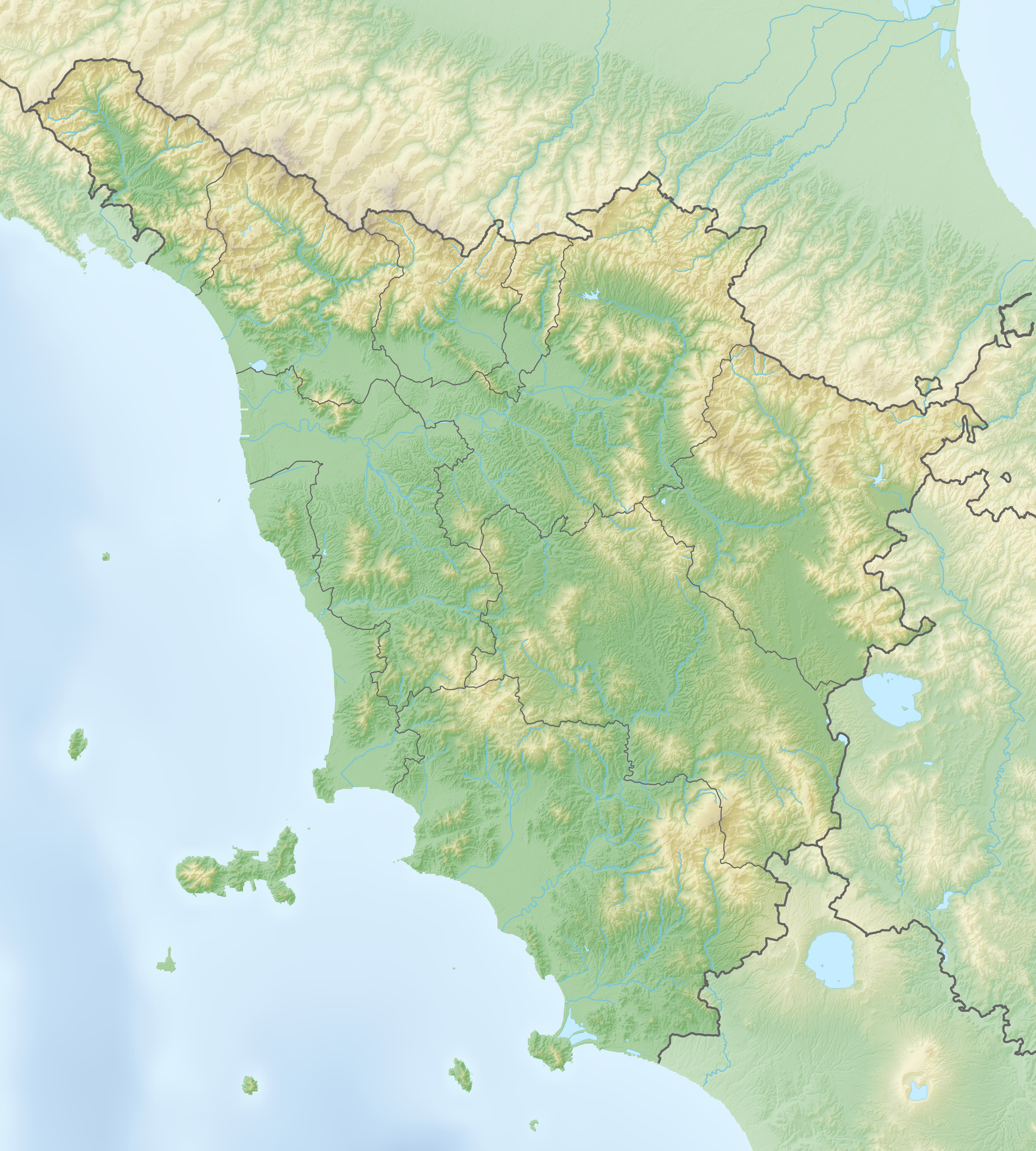
- Location within Tuscany
- Location: Province of Grosseto, Tuscany
- Coordinates: 42°28′58.00″N 11°33′07.00″E
- Basin countries: Italy
- Surface elevation: 160 m (520 ft)

Lago del Tafone is a lake in the Province of Grosseto, Tuscany, Italy. It is located between the Albegna and Fiora hills and the Maremma, downstream from the Rocca di Montauto and not far from the border with Lazio. Since 1996, it has been partially included in the protected areas of the Montauto nature reserve.

== See also ==
- Manciano
- Maremma
- Albegna
- Geography of Tuscany
