= Poggio Capanne =

Poggio Capanne Capanne
- Frazione
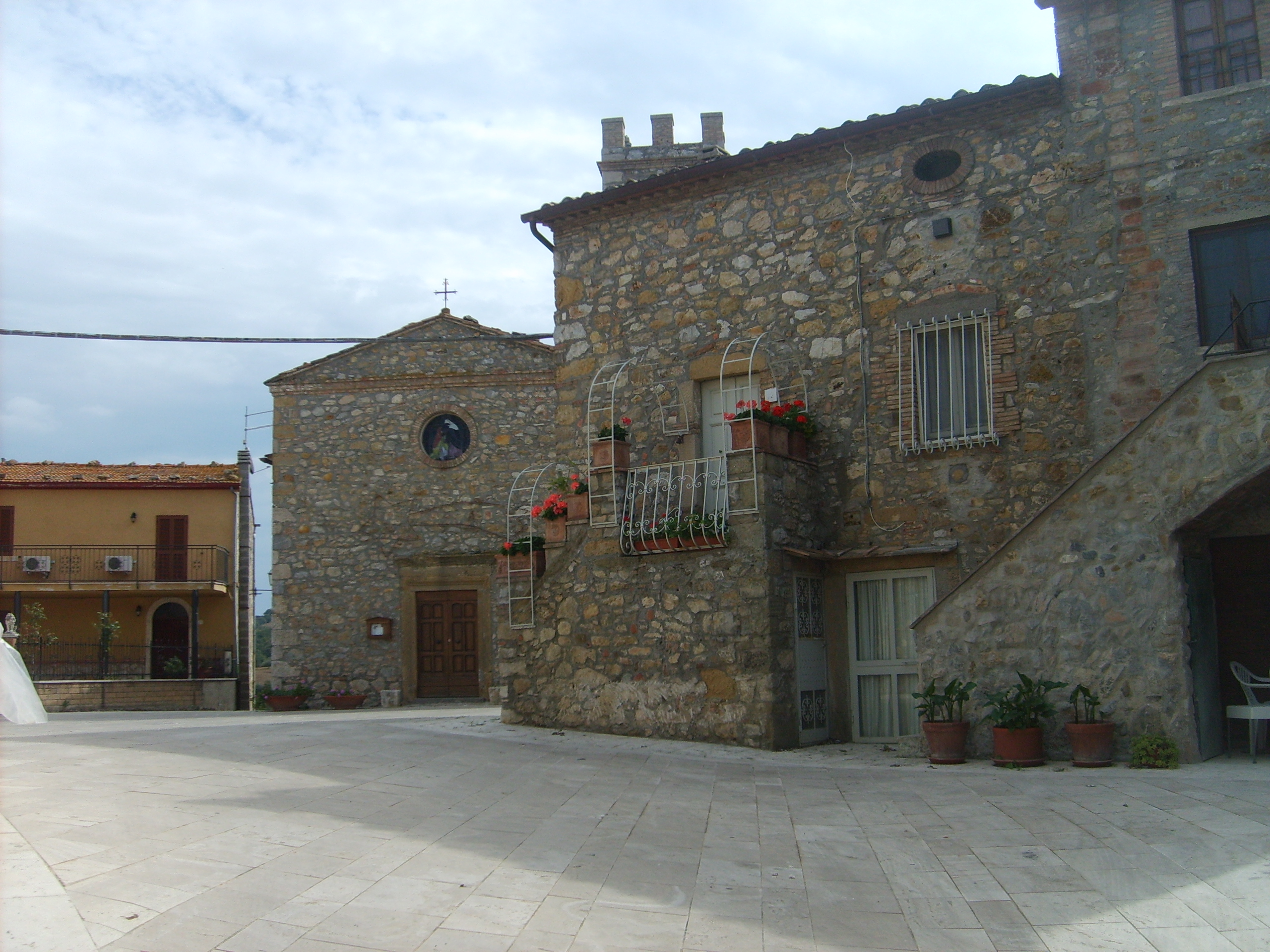
- The main square with the church

- Location of Poggio Capanne in Italy
- Coordinates: 42°41′2″N 11°32′35″E
- Country: Italy
- Region: Tuscany
- Province: Grosseto (GR)
- Comune: Manciano
- Elevation: 373 m (1,224 ft)

Population (2011)
  - Total: 69
- Demonym: Capannaioli
- Time zone: UTC+1 (CET)
  - Summer (DST): UTC+2 (CEST)
- Postal code: 58050

Poggio Capanne is a village in Tuscany, central Italy, administratively a frazione of the comune of Manciano, province of Grosseto. At the time of the 2001 census its population amounted to 101.

== Geography ==
Poggio Capanne is about 60 km from Grosseto and 18 km from Manciano, and it is situated along the Provincial Road which links Montemerano to Sovana, at the top of a small hill ("poggio") in the valley of Albegna.

== History ==
The village, formerly known as Capanne di Saturnia and then just as Capanne, was born in the 15th century as a rural hamlet of shepherds and farmers dependent on the town of Saturnia.

== Main sights ==
- Church of Visitazione di Maria (16th century), main parish church of the village, it was built in 1570.
- Casa Luciani, one of the oldest buildings in the village, it was built in 1500, as indicated on the facade. It hosted also the canonica.
- Old prison of Saturnia (16th century), it is situated next to the church in the main square of the village.

== Bibliography ==
- (in Italian) Emanuele Repetti, «Poggio Capanne», Dizionario Geografico Fisico Storico della Toscana, 1833–1846.
- Bruno Santi, Guida storico-artistica alla Maremma. Itinerari culturali nella provincia di Grosseto, Siena, Nuova Immagine, 1995, p. 291.
- Giovanni De Feo, Le città del tufo nella valle del Fiora. Guida ai centri etruschi e medioevali della Maremma collinare, Pitigliano, Laurum Editrice, 2005.

== See also ==
- Marsiliana
- Montemerano
- Poderi di Montemerano
- Poggio Murella
- San Martino sul Fiora
- Saturnia
