= Poggio Murella =

- Frazione
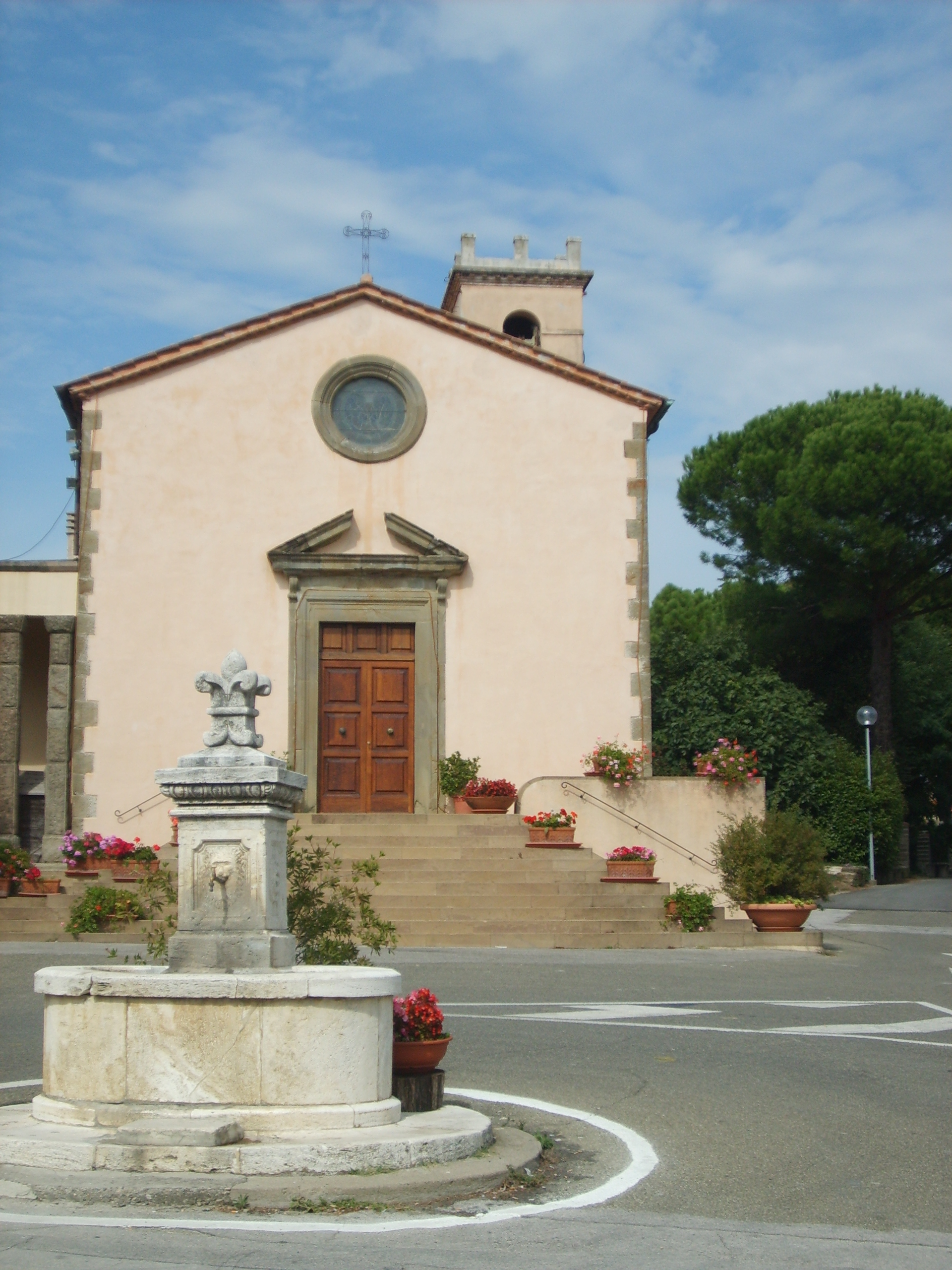
- The main square with the church

- Location of Poggio Murella in Italy
- Coordinates: 42°40′29″N 11°33′1″E
- Country: Italy
- Region: Tuscany
- Province: Grosseto (GR)
- Comune: Manciano
- Elevation: 410 m (1,350 ft)

Population (2011)
  - Total: 287
- Demonym: Poggiaioli
- Time zone: UTC+1 (CET)
  - Summer (DST): UTC+2 (CEST)
- Postal code: 58050

Poggio Murella is a village in Tuscany, central Italy, administratively a frazione of the comune of Manciano, province of Grosseto. At the time of the 2011 census its population amounted to 287.

== Geography ==
Poggio Murella is about 60 km from Grosseto and 15 km from Manciano, and it is situated in the southern side of the hill ("poggio") of Poggio Capanne, in the valley of Albegna.

Poggio Murella is composed by several borgate (hamlets): Basso, Bubbolina, Greppo, Poderino, Poggetto, Poggio Sassorosso, Sellaie, Termine, Torre.

== History ==
The village was formerly known as Poggio di Saturnia and then as Poggio di Capanne, and it was renamed with its current name in 1927, as it became a frazione of Manciano.

== Main sights ==
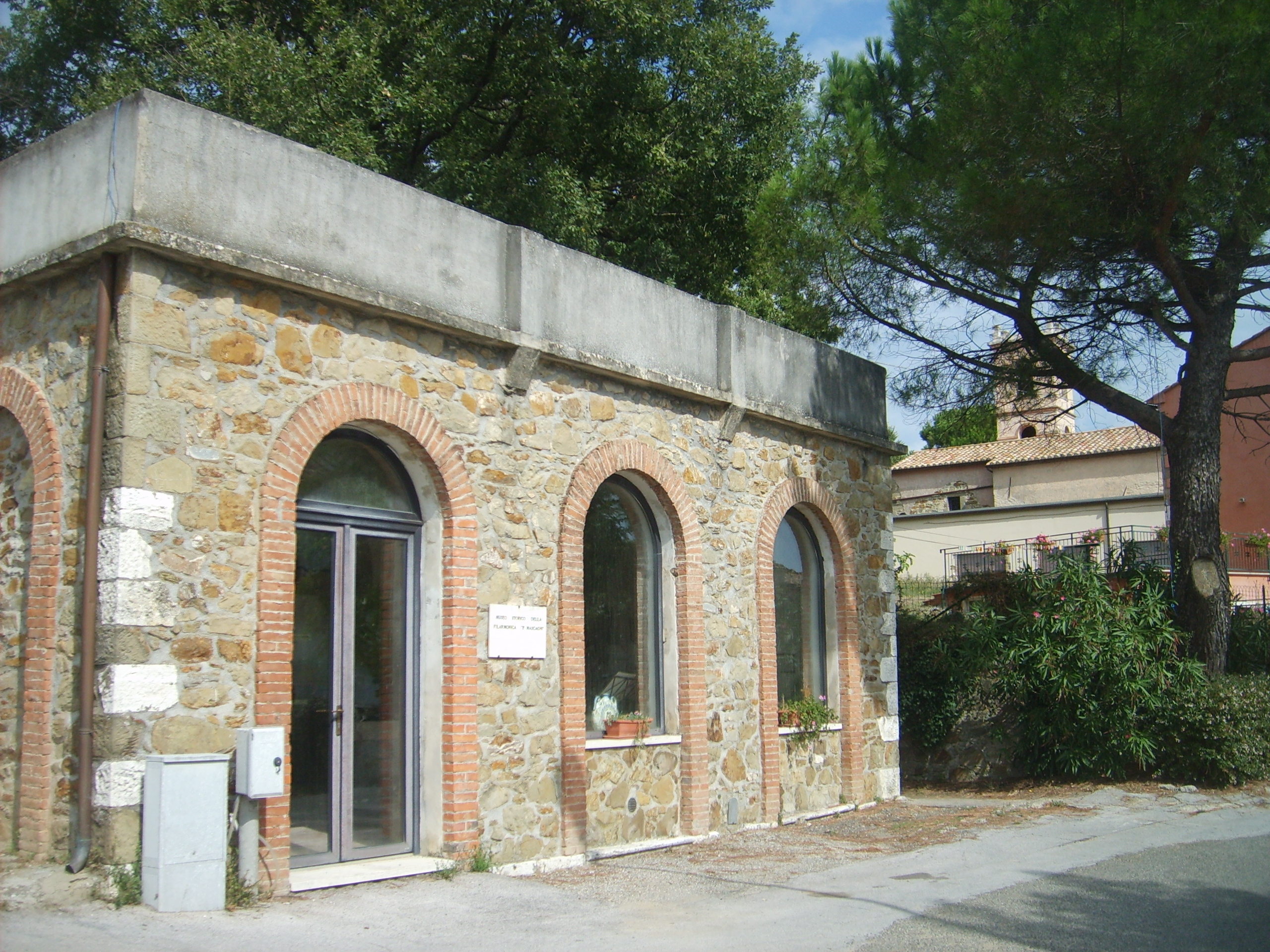
The Museum of the Philharmonic Pietro Mascagni

- San Giuseppe (19th century), main parish church of the village, it was built by the will of the wealthy landowner Giuseppe Zammarchi in the late 19th century.
- Castellum Aquarum, a large Roman cistern with the interior divided into two naves with barrel vaults and covered by opus reticulatum.

== Bibliography ==
- Giovanni De Feo, Le città del tufo nella valle del Fiora. Guida ai centri etruschi e medioevali della Maremma collinare, Pitigliano, Laurum Editrice, 2005.

== See also ==
- Marsiliana
- Montemerano
- Poderi di Montemerano
- Poggio Capanne
- San Martino sul Fiora
- Saturnia
