= San Martino sul Fiora =

- Frazione
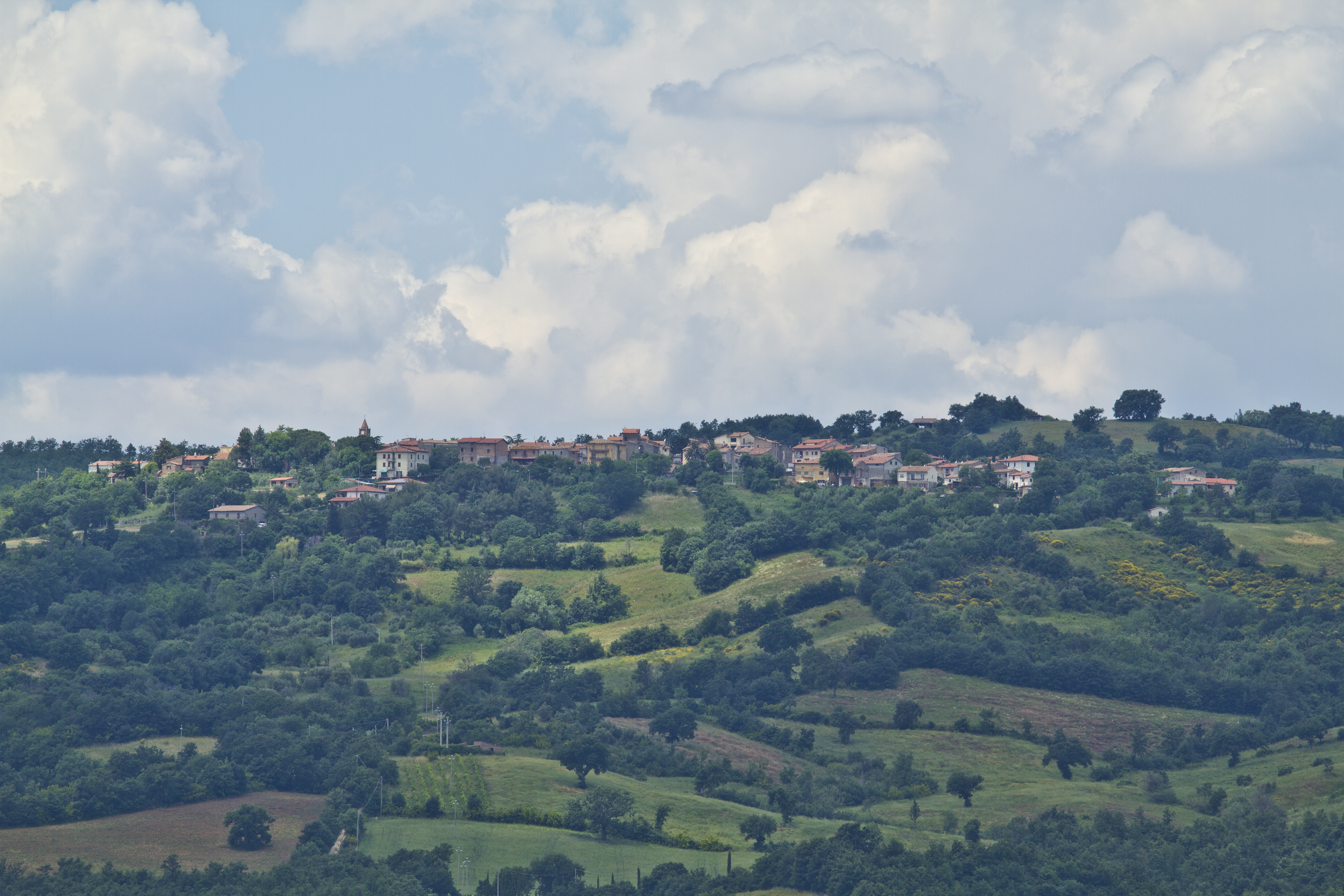
- View of San Martino sul Fiora

- Location of San Martino sul Fiora in Italy
- Coordinates: 42°40′21″N 11°35′45″E
- Country: Italy
- Region: Tuscany
- Province: Grosseto (GR)
- Comune: Manciano
- Elevation: 446 m (1,463 ft)

Population (2011)
  - Total: 211
- Demonym: Sammartinesi
- Time zone: UTC+1 (CET)
  - Summer (DST): UTC+2 (CEST)
- Postal code: 58050

San Martino sul Fiora is a village in Tuscany, central Italy, administratively a frazione of the comune of Manciano, province of Grosseto. At the time of the 2001 census its population amounted to 224.

== Geography ==
San Martino sul Fiora is about 70 km from Grosseto and 15 km from Manciano, and it is situated along the Provincial Road which links Catabbio to Sovana, in the valley of Fiora.

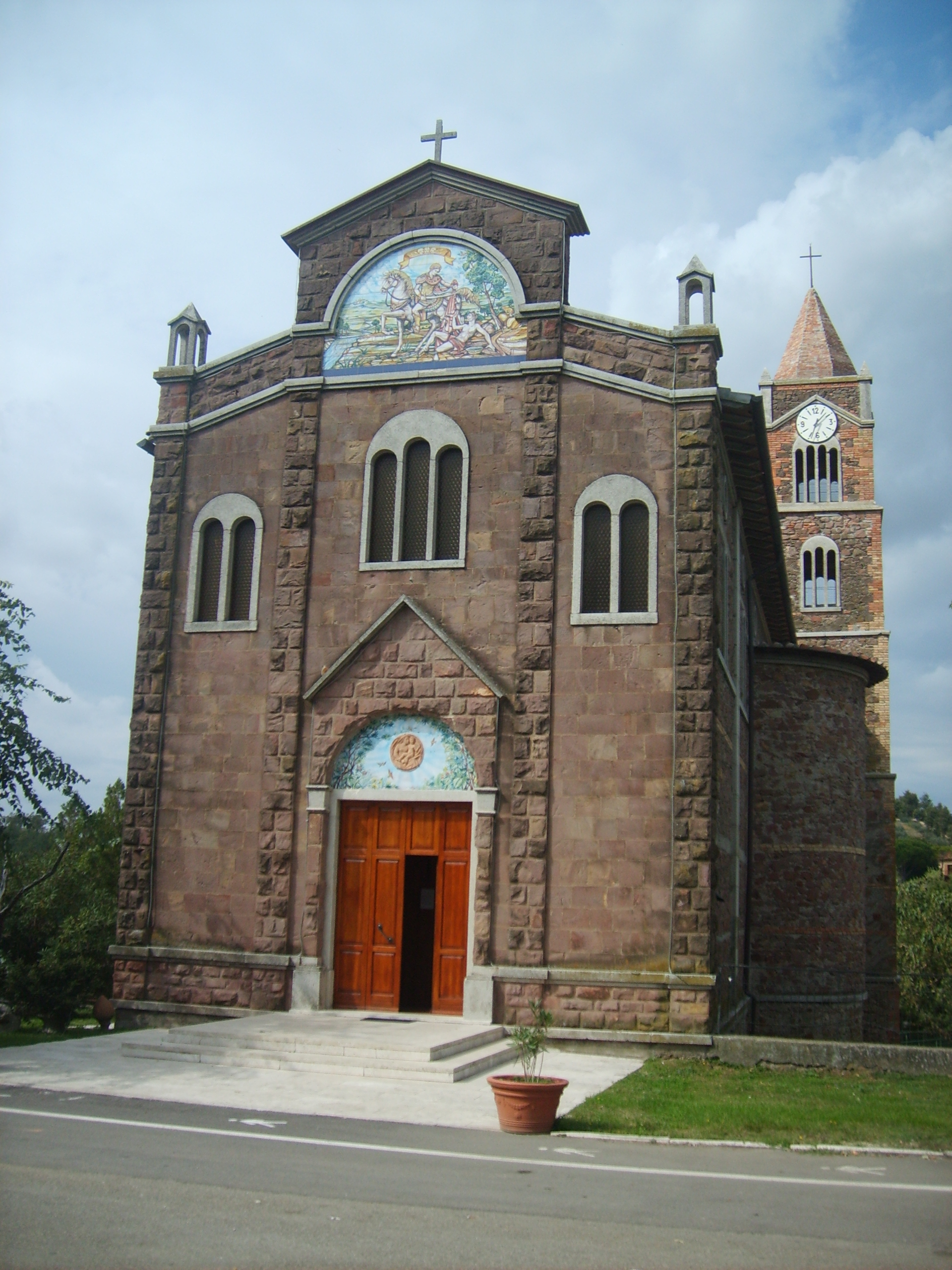
The church of San Martino

== History ==
The village was formerly known as San Martino di Poggio Pelato and as San Martino di Monticchio.

It became part of the comune of Sorano in 1738. It was renamed with its current name in 1929, as it switched to the comune of Manciano, its current municipality.

== Main sights ==
- San Martino (16th century), main parish church of the village, it was entirely re-built in 1956 in a Romanesque Revival architecture with Moorish Revival elements. It contains two 17th-century paintings.
- Convent of San Francesco (16th century), it's now in ruins.

== Bibliography ==
- (in Italian) Emanuele Repetti, «San Martino sul Fiora », Dizionario Geografico Fisico Storico della Toscana, 1833–1846.
- Giovanni De Feo, Le città del tufo nella valle del Fiora. Guida ai centri etruschi e medioevali della Maremma collinare, Pitigliano, Laurum Editrice, 2005.

== See also ==
- Marsiliana
- Montemerano
- Poderi di Montemerano
- Poggio Capanne
- Poggio Murella
- Saturnia
