= Pitigliano Cathedral =

Roman Catholic cathedral

Coordinates: 42.6338°N 11.6658°E

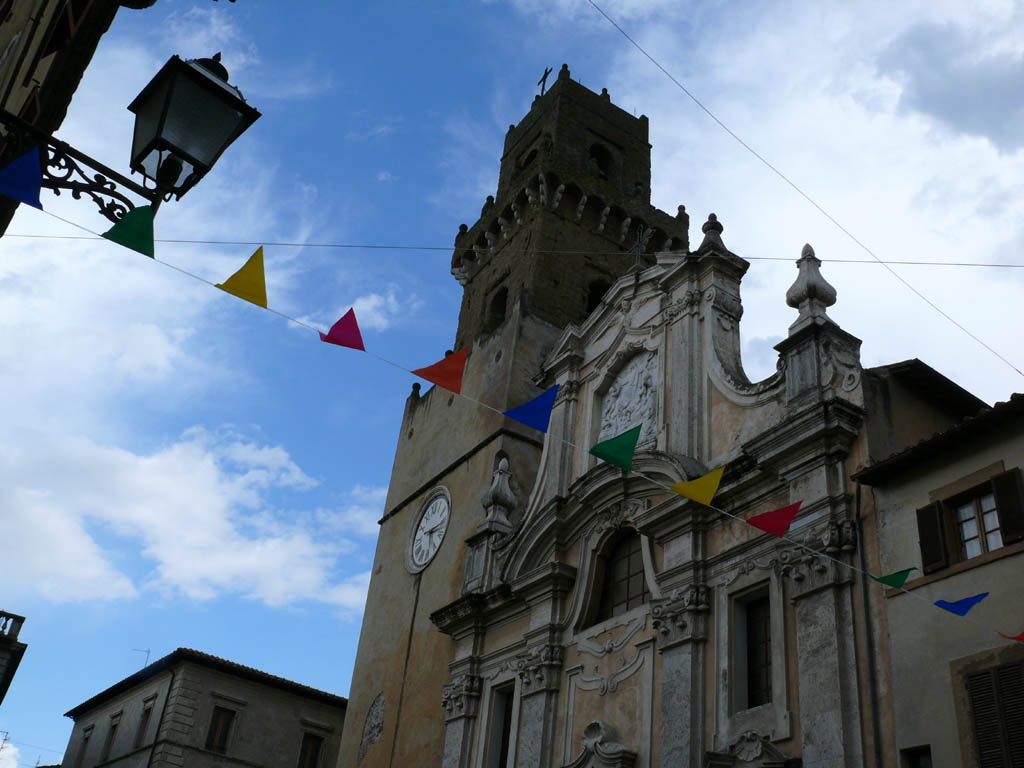
Pitigliano Cathedral

Pitigliano Cathedral (Italian: Duomo di Pitigliano; Cattedrale dei Santi Pietro e Paolo) is a Roman Catholic cathedral dedicated to Saints Peter and Paul in the town of Pitigliano, in the region of Tuscany, Italy.

It is currently the episcopal seat of the Diocese of Pitigliano-Sovana-Orbetello, established in 1986.

== History ==
The parish church of San Pietro in Pitigliano was made a collegiate church in 1509, and then refurbished under count Niccola III degli Orsini, when the dedication was changed to Saints Peter and Paul (Santi Pietro e Paolo). In 1844, the church became the cathedral of the Diocese of Sovana, which was accordingly renamed on 11 January 1844 as the Diocese of Sovana–Pitigliano, and remained the cathedral after the see was again renamed on 25 March 1925 as the Diocese of Sovana–Pitigliano–Orbetello. The see was renamed once more on 30 June 1986, moving Pitigliano to the first position in the present diocesan title: Diocese of Pitigliano–Sovana–Orbetello.

== Description ==
The church was restored in 1692–1702. In 1717 the Romanesque altar was replaced by a new Baroque altar. The west front also dates from the 18th century. The cathedral has an altarpiece in the choir, depicting the Enthroned Madonna with Saints Peter and Francis (1494) by Guidoccio Cozzarelli. In addition, in 1885, Pietro Aldi painted two large canvases, Henry IV at Canossa and the Life of Ildeprando in Sovana.
