= Poderi di Montemerano =

- Frazione
- Location of Poderi di Montemerano in Italy
- Coordinates: 42°36′40″N 11°30′22″E
- Country: Italy
- Region: Tuscany
- Province: Grosseto (GR)
- Comune: Manciano
- Elevation: 336 m (1,102 ft)

Population (2011)
  - Total: 106
- Demonym: Poderani
- Time zone: UTC+1 (CET)
  - Summer (DST): UTC+2 (CEST)
- Postal code: 58050

Poderi di Montemerano is a village in Tuscany, central Italy, administratively a frazione of the comune of Manciano, province of Grosseto. At the time of the 2001 census its population amounted to 84.

Poderi di Montemerano is about 50 km from Grosseto and 4 km from Manciano, and it is situated along the Provincial Road which links Scansano to Manciano, at the foot of the hill of Montemerano. The village was born in the late 16th century as Poderi di Sotto, and it significantly developed in the 18th century.

== Main sights ==
- Santa Maria degli Angeli (20th century), main parish church of the village, it was built in 1955. Its architecture is inspired by the Romanesque style.
- Castelletto Santarelli, one of the oldest buildings in the village, it dates back to the 18th century.

== See also ==
- Marsiliana
- Montemerano
- Poggio Capanne
- Poggio Murella
- San Martino sul Fiora
- Saturnia
