= Catabbio =

- Frazione
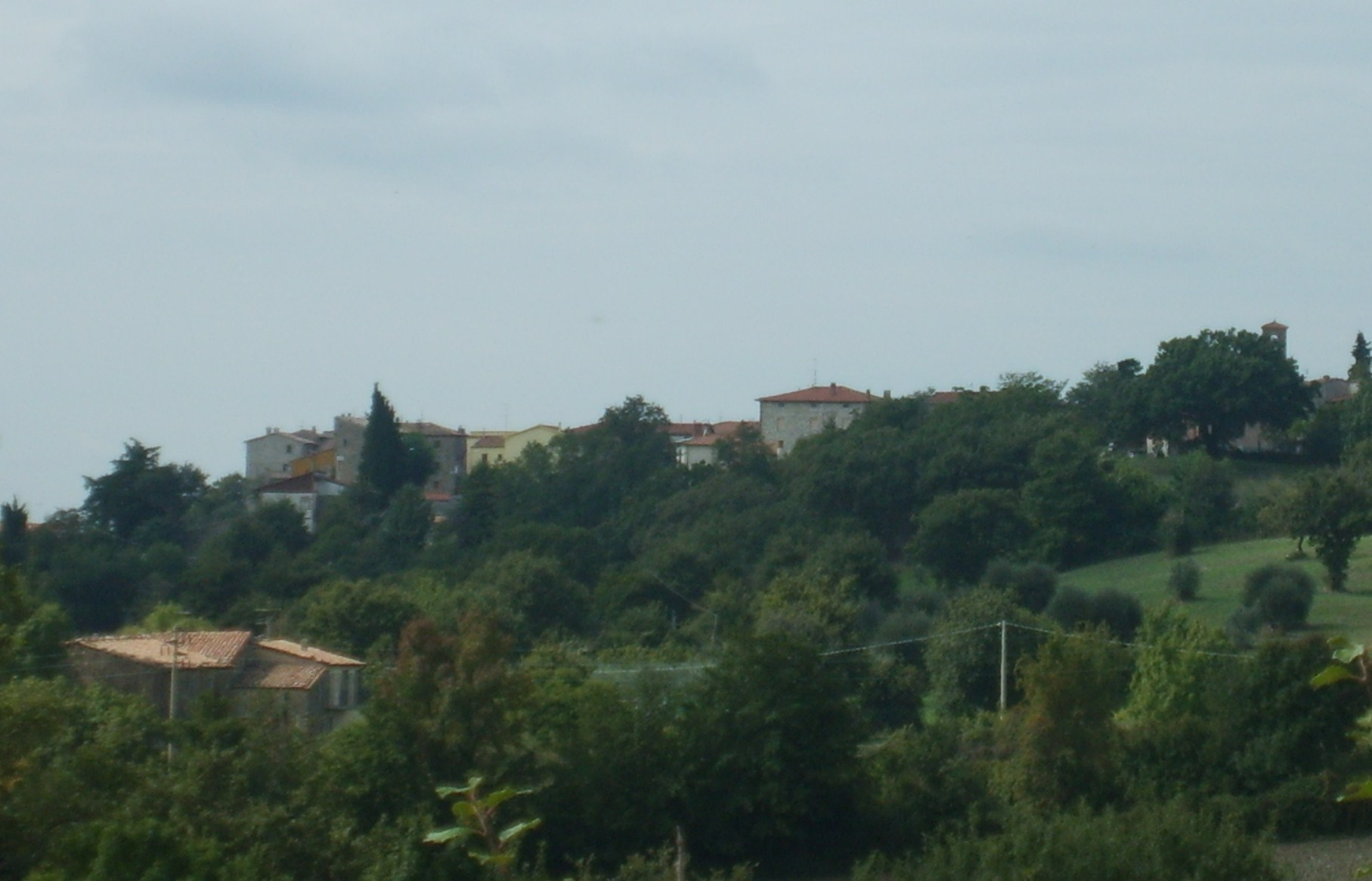
- View of Catabbio

- Location of Catabbio in Italy
- Coordinates: 42°42′8″N 11°34′6″E
- Country: Italy
- Region: Tuscany
- Province: Grosseto (GR)
- Comune: Semproniano
- Elevation: 504 m (1,654 ft)

Population (2011)
  - Total: 175
- Demonym: Catabbiesi
- Time zone: UTC+1 (CET)
  - Summer (DST): UTC+2 (CEST)
- Postal code: 58055
- Dialing code: (+39) 0564

Catabbio is a village in Tuscany, central Italy, administratively a frazione of the comune of Semproniano, province of Grosseto. At the time of the 2001 census its population amounted to 203.

== Geography ==
Catabbio is about 65 km from Grosseto and 5 km from Semproniano, and it is situated along the Provincial Road which links Montemerano to Sovana. The village is divided into four hamlets: Casa Rigo, Santarello, Scalabrelli and Verziliani.

== Main sights ==
- Church of Sant'Anna, main parish church of the village, it is situated in the square of the main hamlet of Santarello.
- Church of Santa Lucia, little church in the hamlet of Scalabrelli, it contains a Renaissance stoup of 1574.
- Castle of Catabbio, old castle built by the Aldobrandeschi in the 12th century, it's now in ruins.

== Bibliography ==
- Aldo Mazzolai, Guida della Maremma. Percorsi tra arte e natura, Florence, Le Lettere, 1997.
- Giuseppe Guerrini, Torri e castelli della provincia di Grosseto, Siena, Nuova Immagine Editrice, 1999.

== See also ==
- Cellena
- Petricci
- Rocchette di Fazio
- Semproniano
