= Albegna =

Albegna River
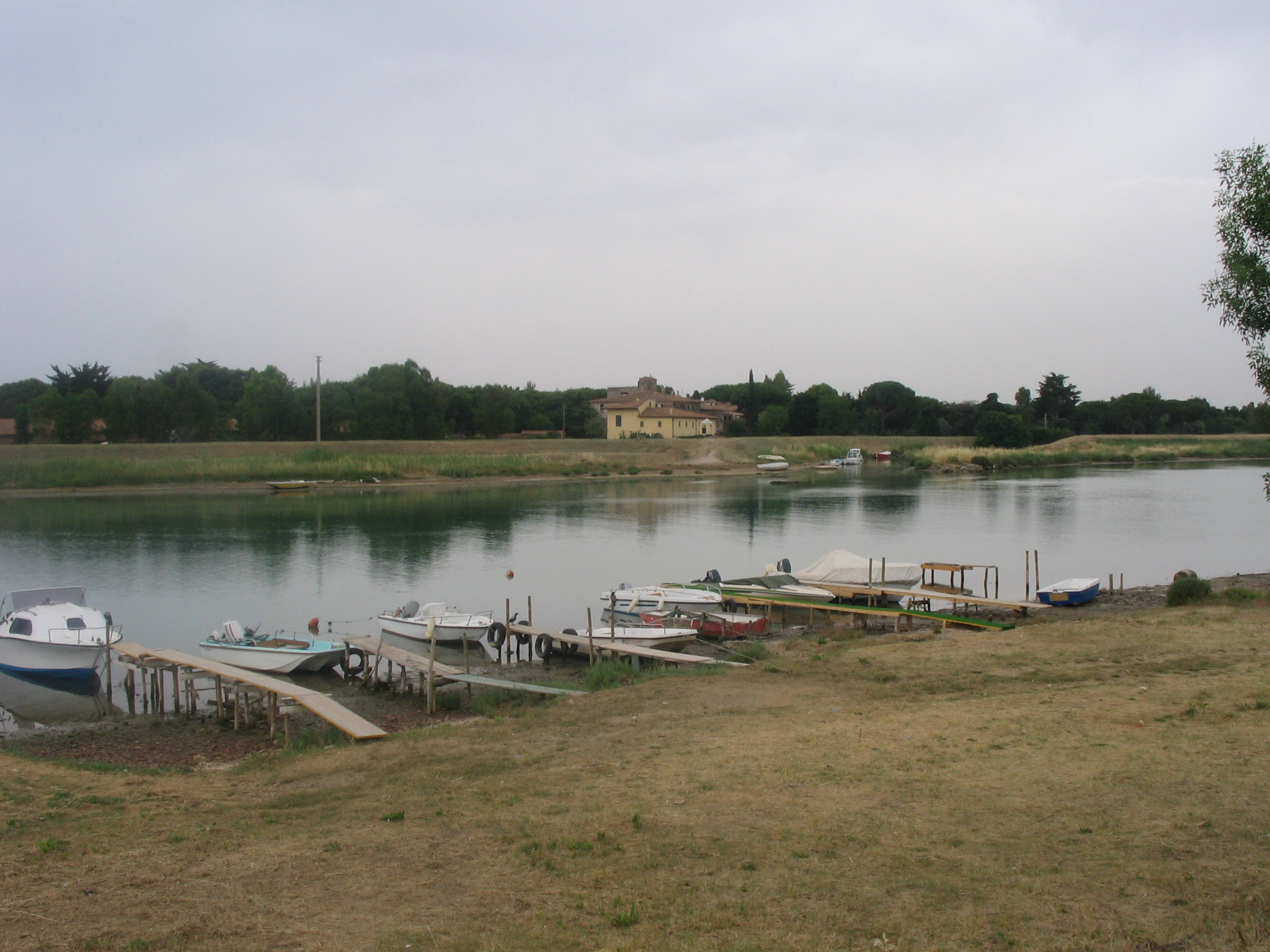

- Location of mouth

Location
- Country: Italy

Physical characteristics
- Source
  - location: Monte Buceto (Monte Amiata)
  - elevation: approx. 1,700 m (5,600 ft) above sea level
- Mouth: Tyrrhenian Sea
  - location: Albinia
  - coordinates: 42.5015°N 11.1920°E
- Length: 70 km (43 mi)
- Discharge
  - average: 15 m^{3}/s (530 cu ft/s)

The Albegna is a river in southern Tuscany, the sources of which are located in province of Grosseto on the southern side of Monte Buceto, the southwestern part of the volcanic cone of Mount Amiata, along with the northern side of Monte Aquilaia, and the Riserva Poggio all'Olmo.

The river flows downstream initially heading south, passing first from the town of Roccalbegna and moving later into the western part of the municipality of Semproniano, downstream to Rocchette di Fazio, and crossing the Bosco dei Rocconi Natural Reserve. Soon after, it enters the town of Manciano and, near the village of Saturnia, it turns right towards the south-west. Once it reaches the town of Marsiliana, it forms the dell'Albegna plain.

The river flows into the Tyrrhenian Sea near the town of Albinia, bordered on the north by the tombolo of Giannella which connects Monte Argentario to the mainland.
