= Terme di Saturnia =

Group of thermal springs located in Manciano, Italy

Coordinates: 42°39′29.21″N 11°30′58.35″E

The Terme di Saturnia are a group of thermal springs located in the municipality of Manciano in Italy, a few kilometers from the village of Saturnia, Province of Grosseto. The springs that feed the baths, which are found in the south-eastern valley, cover a vast territory that stretches from Mount Amiata to the coast.

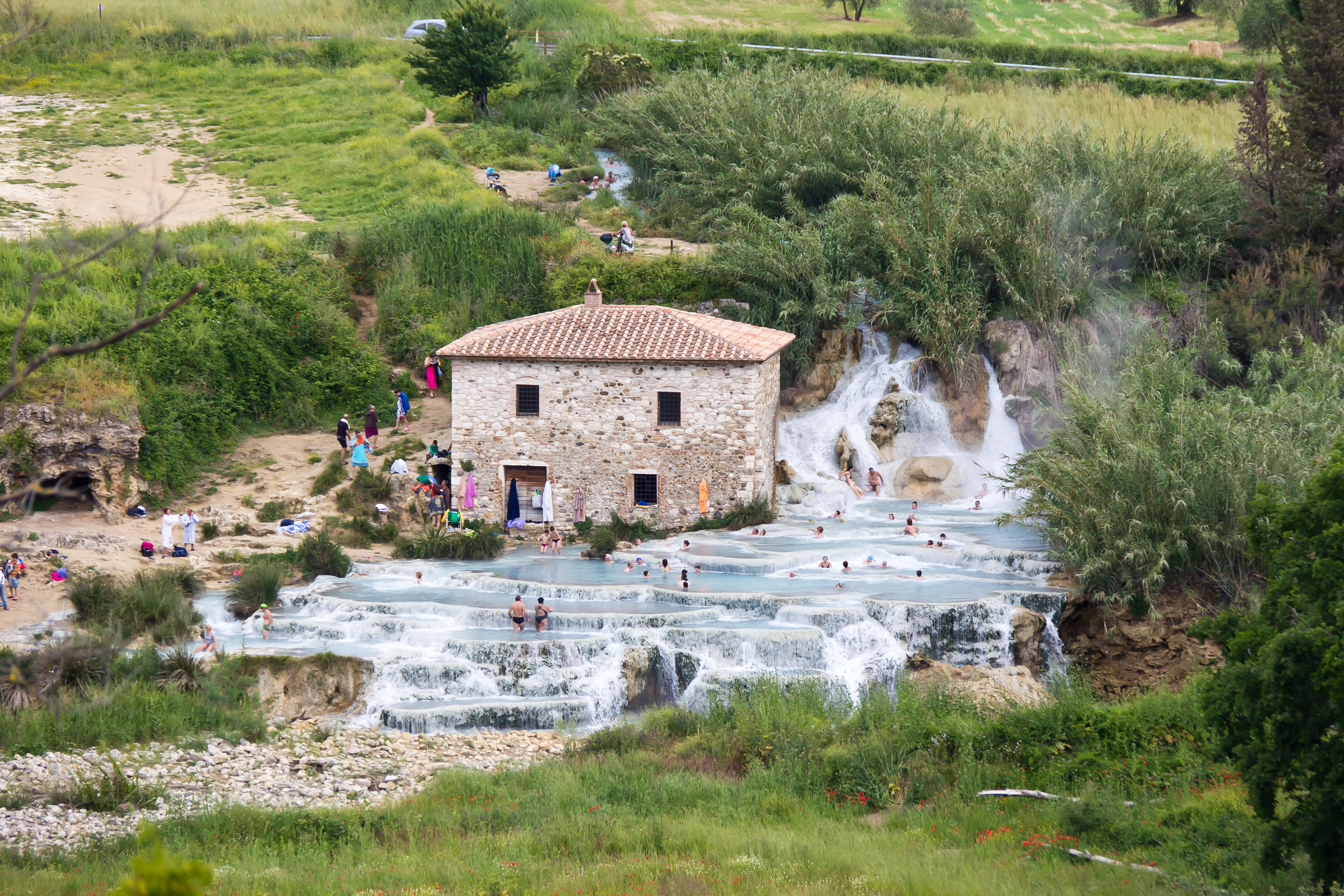
View of the Springs (Cascade del Mulino)

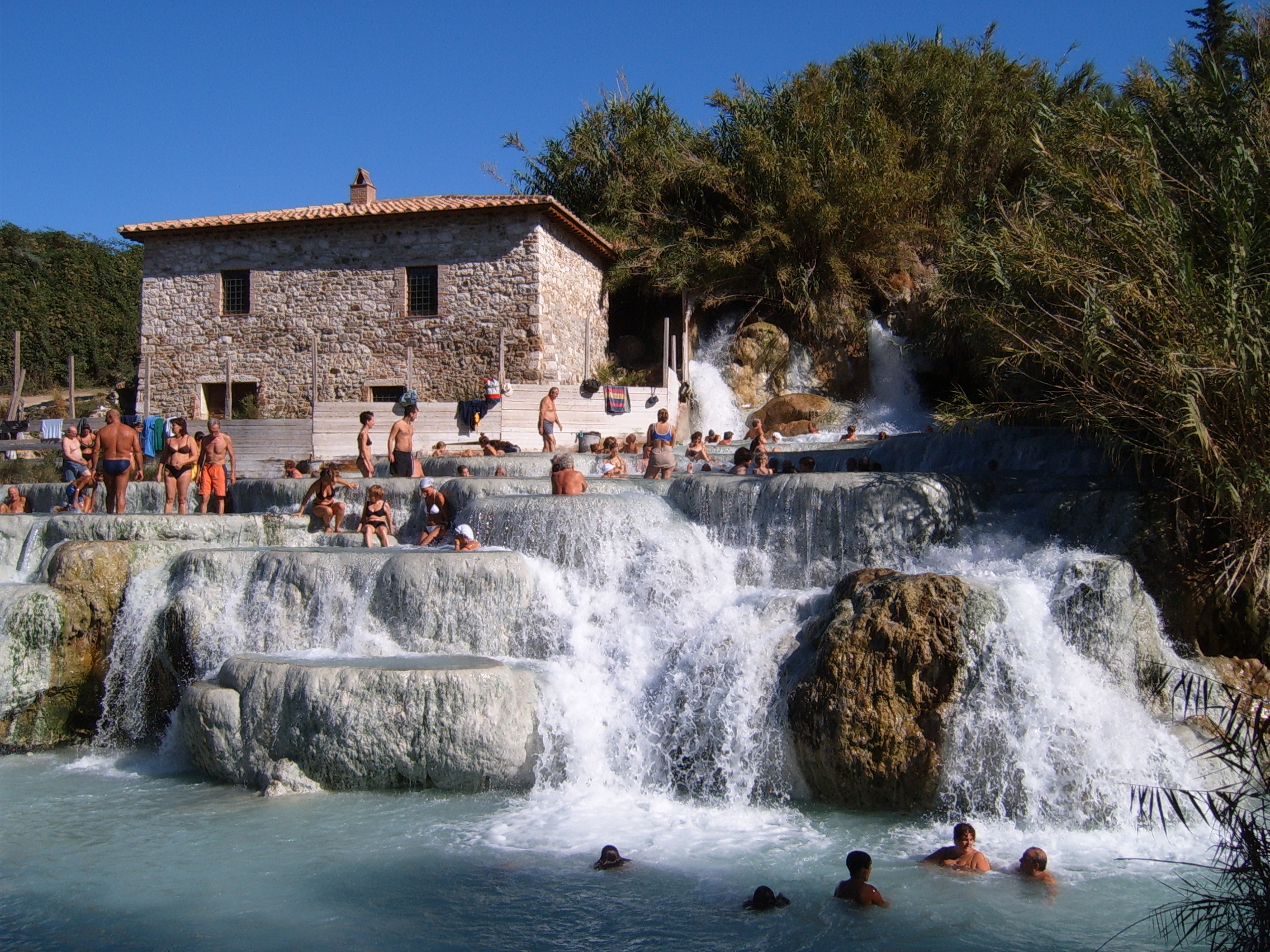
Cascade del Mulino

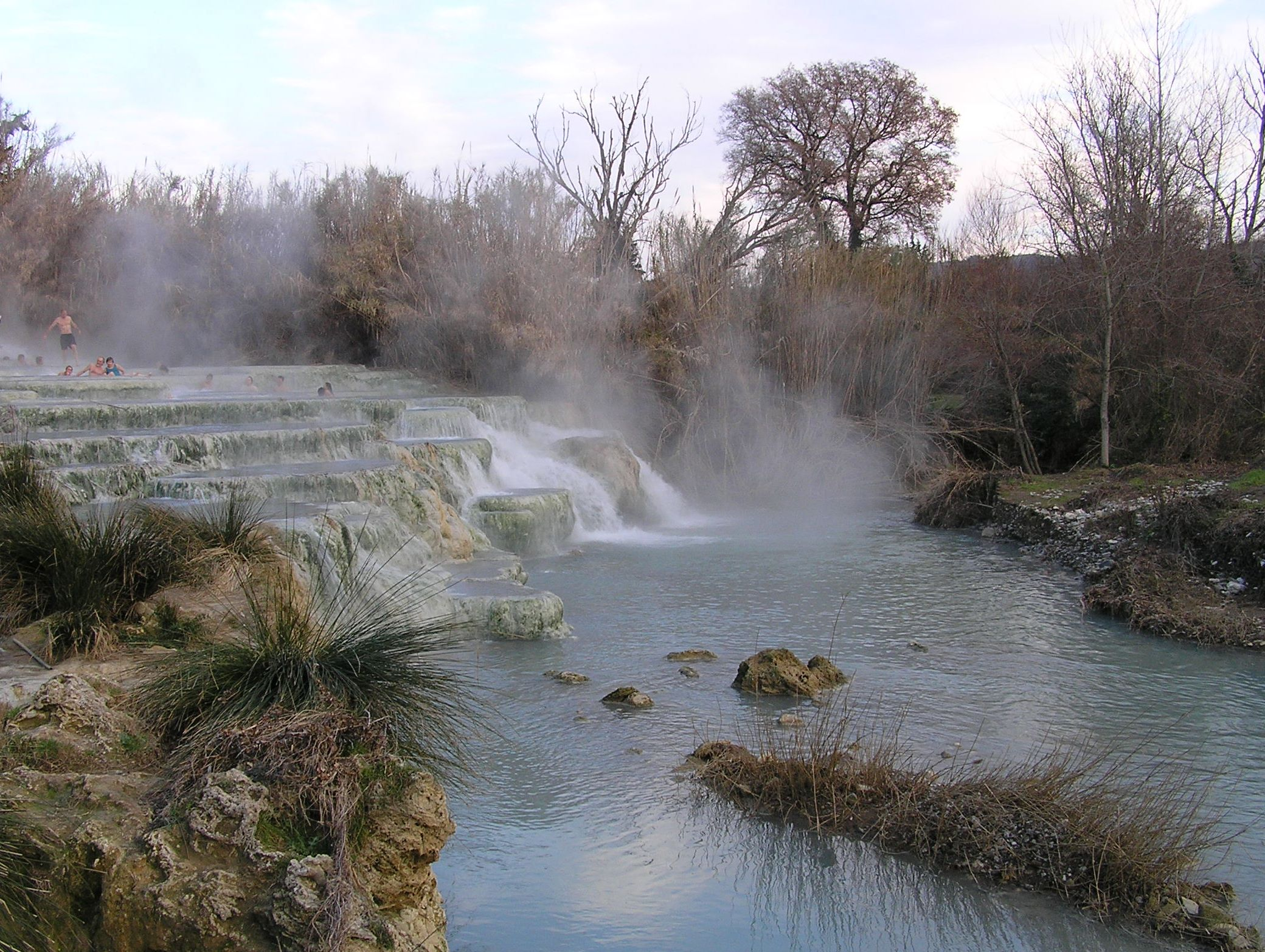
Gorello waterfalls

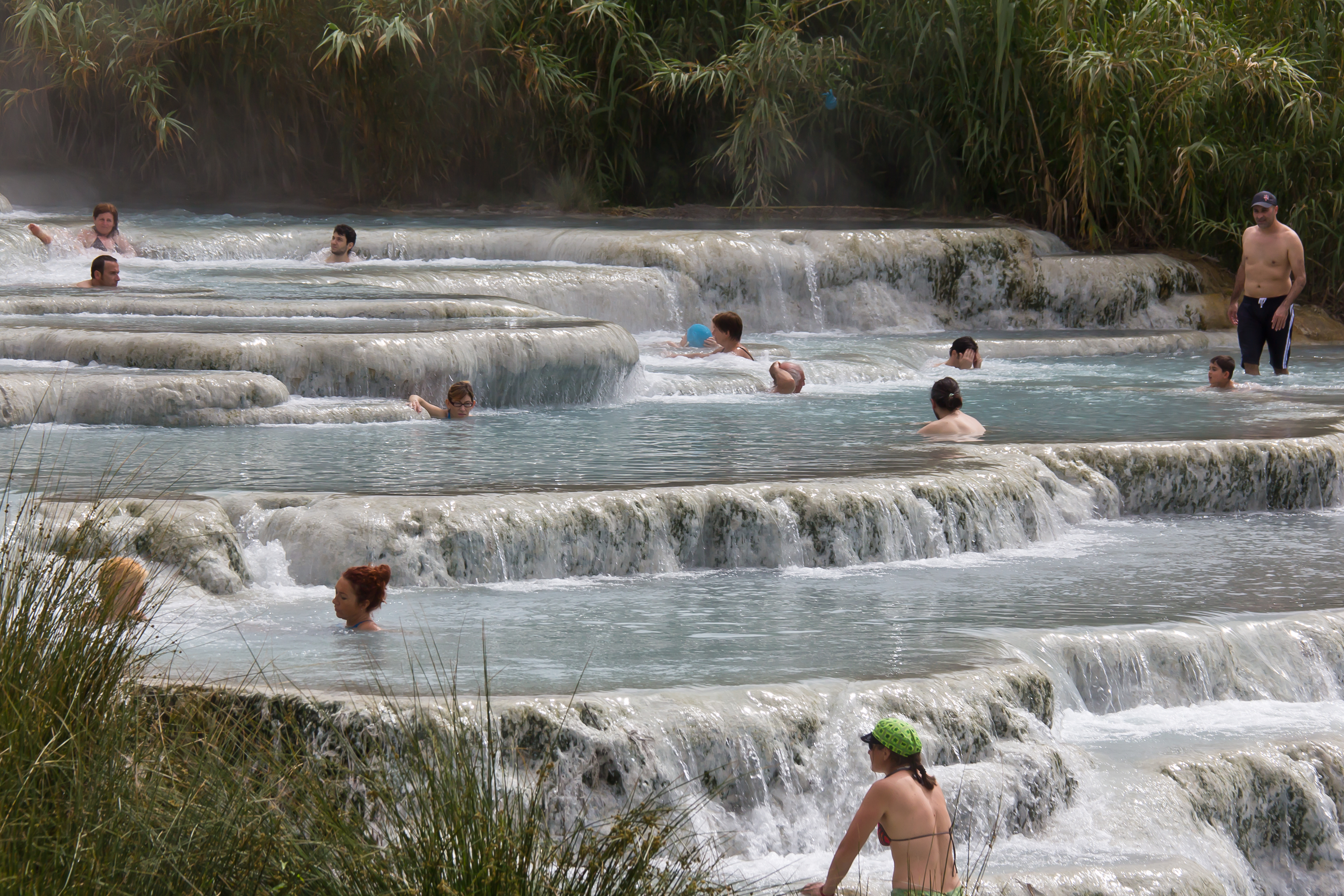
Thermal spring of Saturnia, Mulino waterfall

== Toponym ==
One legend, according to the Etruscans and Romans, was that the Terme di Saturnia were formed by lightning bolts, thrown by Jupiter. During a violent quarrel between the two mythological deities, the bolts thrown towards Saturn had missed, causing the hot springs travertine formations.

== Location ==
Located in the town of Saturnia within the Grosseto Province, the hot springs are sited within this ancient town site, founded by Etruscans in the 4th-century BC. Saturnia is allegedly the first community to be founded in Italy. The springs are adjacent to hot springs at Cascade del Mulino, both are located in the Maremma area. There is an ancient necropolis built by the Etruscans nearby. The area around the hot springs provide habitat for fox, wild boars, wolves and hedgehogs.

== Water profile ==
The sulphurous geothermal spring water is at a temperature of around 37.5 °C (99.5 °F).

The main thermal waterfalls are the Mill Falls, located at an old mill as well as the Waterfalls of Gorello.

The yield of the source is about 800 liters per second, which guarantees an optimal replacement of water. The chemical make-up is sulfur, carbon, sulfate, bicarbonate-alkaline, earth, with the presence of hydrogen sulfide gas and carbon dioxide. It is claimed, since ancient Roman times, that the hot mineral water has balneotheraputic properties.

== See also ==
- Saturnia
- Manciano

== Bibliography ==
- Aldo Mazzolai. Guida della Maremma. Percorsi tra arte e natura. Florence, Le Lettere, 1997.
