= Pietro Aldi =

Italian painter

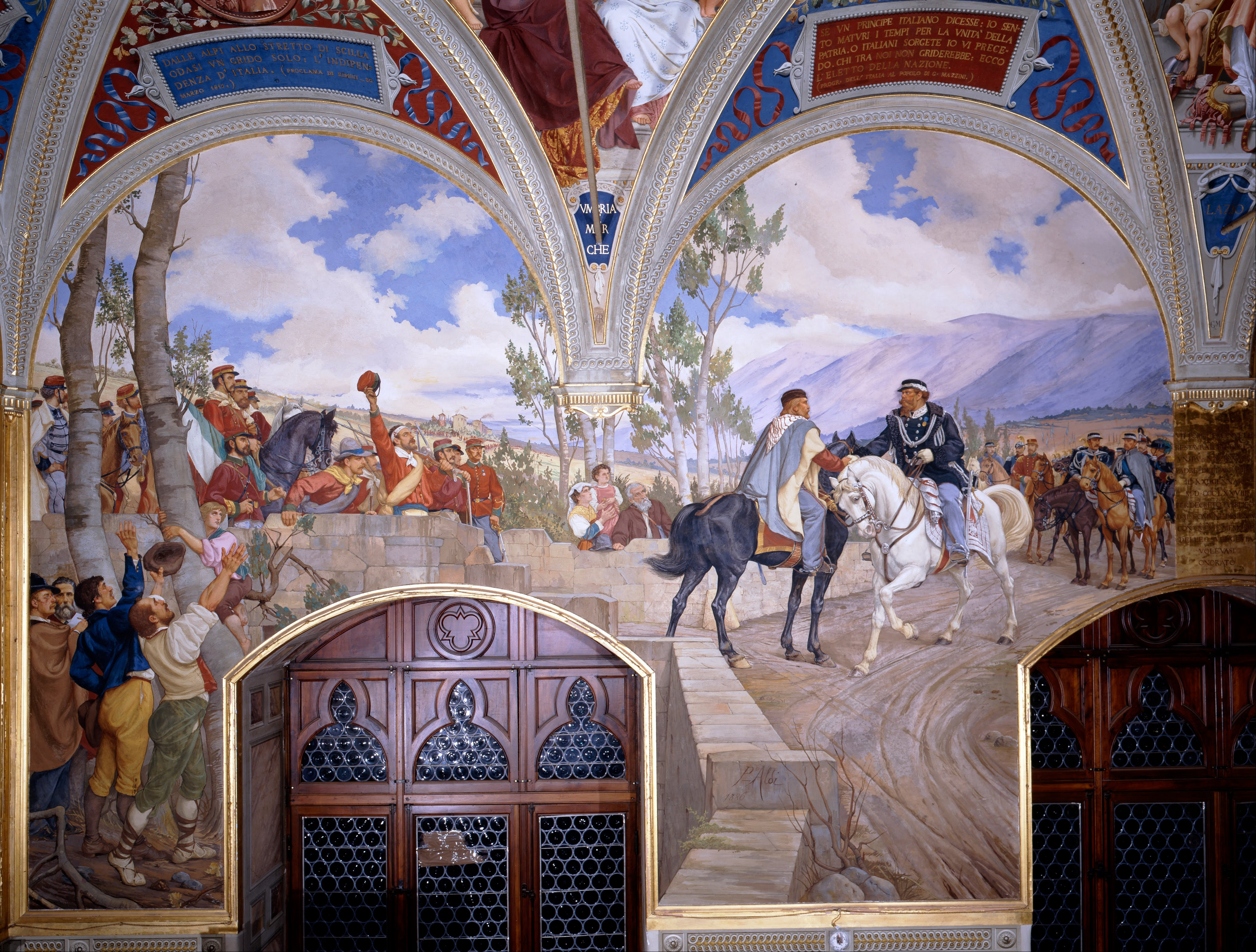
Victor Emmanuel II Meeting Giuseppe Garibaldi at Teano

Pietro Aldi (1852–1888) was an academic Italian painter known for his subjects on romantic themes.

== Biography ==
Pietro Aldi was born in Manciano. He studied at the Academy of Siena with Luigi Mussini. In 1874, he is awarded a stipend at the Biningueci competition for La sconfitta di Corradino di Svevia a Tagliacozzo (Defeat of Conradin, Duke of Swabia, at the Battle of Tagliacozzo) and this allowed him to continue studies in Rome and Venice.

He painted historic subjects in the style of Antonio Ciseri with his master Mussini. He contributed at the frescoes of the Palazzo Pubblico in Siena. He painted two large canvases for the Pitigliano Cathedral.

He died at age 36.

== Some works ==
- L’incontro a Teano (1886), fresco in the Palazzo Pubblico of Siena.
- L'armistizio di Novara (1887), fresco in the Palazzo Pubblico of Siena.
- Two paintings made in 1885 in the Pitigliano Cathedral representing:
  - L'imperatore Arrigo IV a Canossa.
  - La predestinazione del giovane Ildebrando.
- Le ultime ore della libertà senese (1882), Santa Maria della Scala (Sala San Pio), Siena.
- Nerone contempla l'incendio di Roma, Santa Maria della Scala (Sala San Pio), Siena. Unfinished painting.
- Giuditta che mostra la testa di Oloferne, Lateran Palace, Rome.
- San Nicola di Bari, Chiesa di San Nicola, Capalbio (GR).
- Madonna col Bambino che consegna a san Paolo della Croce il progetto del convento (1880), Convento dei Padri Passionisti, Monte Argentario (GR).
- Giuramento di Ghino di Tacco, Palazzo Comunale, Manciano, (GR).
