= Rocchette di Fazio =

- Frazione
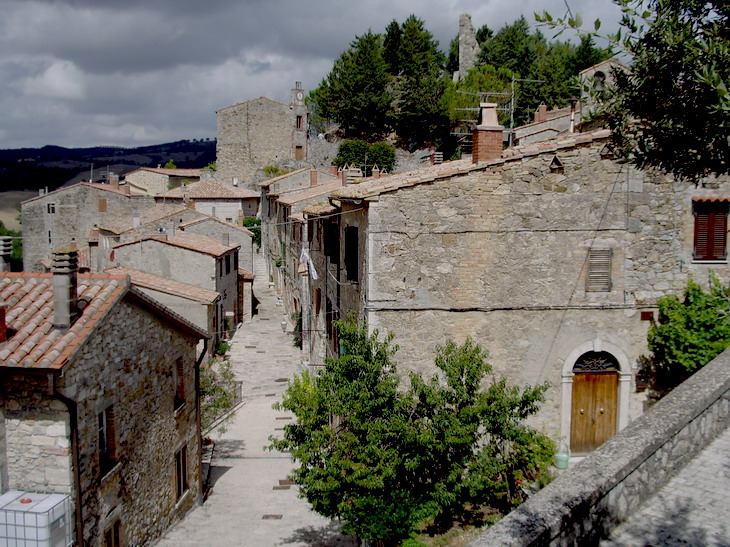
- View of Rocchette di Fazio

- Location of Rocchette di Fazio in Italy
- Coordinates: 42°43′47″N 11°30′40″E
- Country: Italy
- Region: Tuscany
- Province: Grosseto (GR)
- Comune: Semproniano
- Elevation: 471 m (1,545 ft)

Population (2011)
  - Total: 27
- Demonym: Rocchettini
- Time zone: UTC+1 (CET)
  - Summer (DST): UTC+2 (CEST)
- Postal code: 58055
- Dialing code: (+39) 0564

Rocchette di Fazio is a village in Tuscany, central Italy, administratively a frazione of the comune of Semproniano, province of Grosseto. At the time of the 2001 census its population amounted to 19.

== Geography ==
Rocchette di Fazio is about 56 km from Grosseto and 3 km from Semproniano, and it is situated on a limestone cliff overlooking the valley of Albegna. The small village is included in the Bosco dei Rocconi Natural Reserve.

== History ==
Rocchette di Fazio is named after Fazio Cacciaconti of Trequanda, lord of Rocchette (lit. "small castle") after the fall of the House of Aldobrandeschi of Sovana in the late 13th century.

== Main sights ==
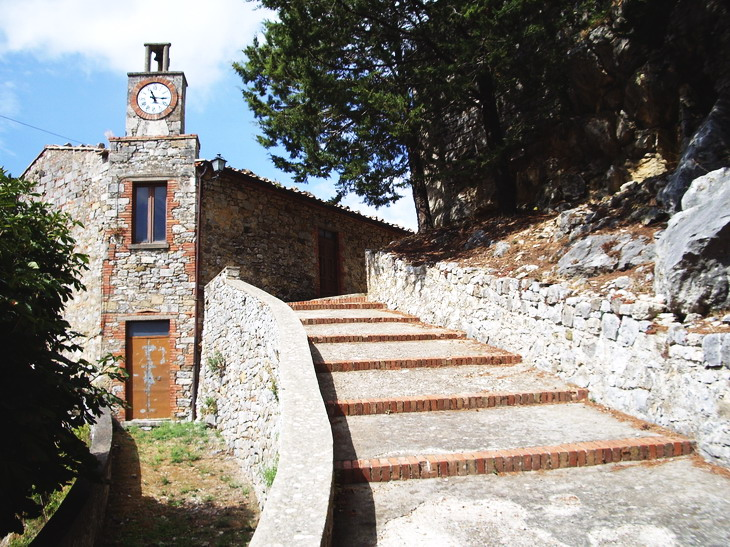
The stairway to the castle

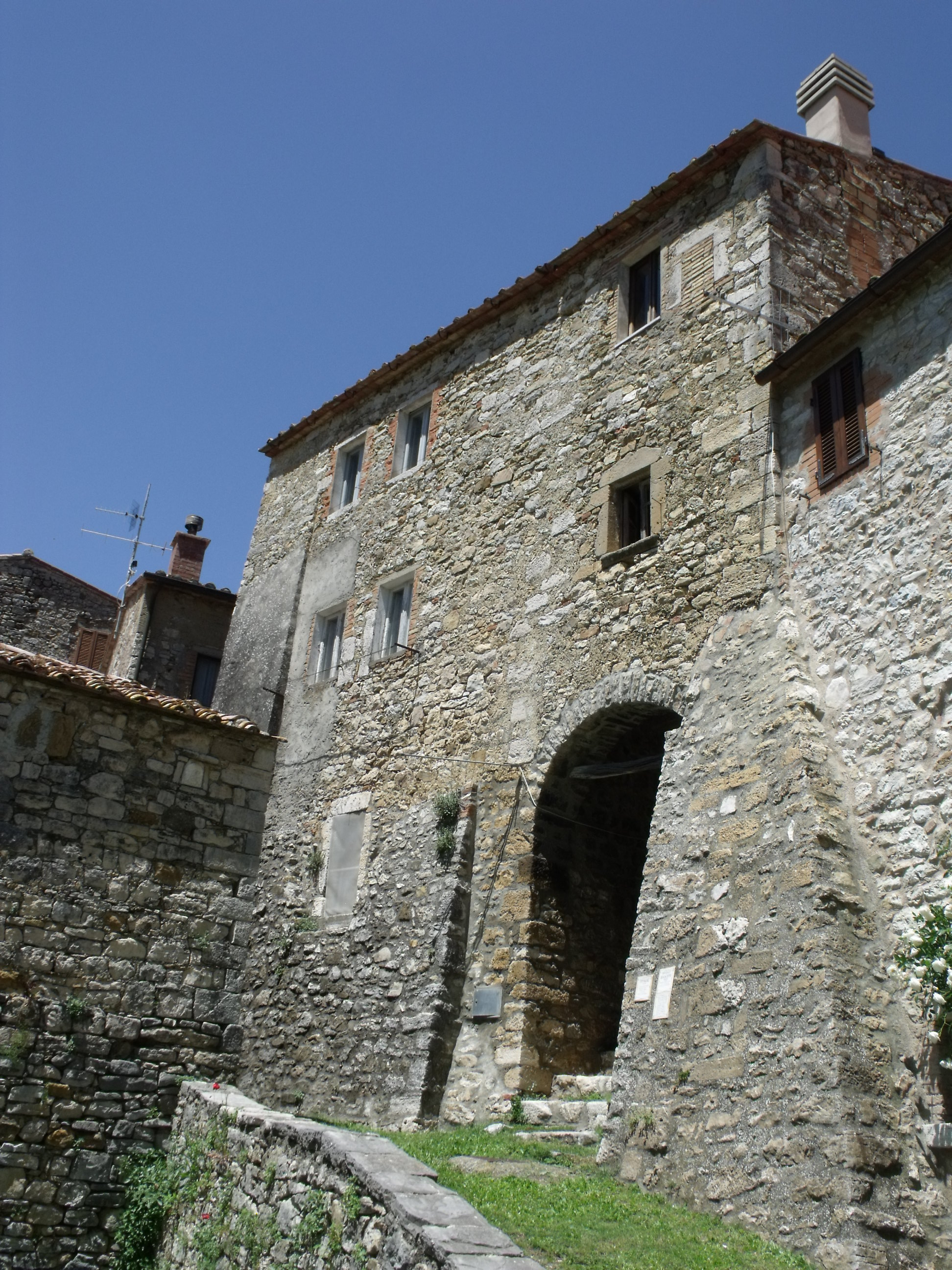
The Ospedaletto

- Pieve of Santa Cristina (13th century), main church of the village, it was property of the Knights Templar. It is now deconsecrated.
- Church of Santa Maria (16th century), it inherited the parish seat from Santa Cristina in 1884.
- Ospedaletto di San Giovanni (Hospital of Saint John), structure built in the 14th century to give hospitality to travelers and pilgrims, it was then the seat of the Knights Templar.
- Castle of Rocchette di Fazio, old complex built by the Aldobrandeschi in the late 12th century, it's composed by several buildings combined, such as the Rocca — originary structure of the castle — the Palazzo di Giustizia — courthouse — and the Palazzo Pretorio — former town hall.
- Walls of Rocchette di Fazio, old fortifications which surround the village since 13th century.

== See also ==
- Catabbio
- Cellena
- Petricci
- Semproniano

== Bibliography ==
- Bruno Santi, Guida storico-artistica alla Maremma. Itinerari culturali nella provincia di Grosseto, Siena, Nuova Immagine, 1995, pp. 242–243.
- Aldo Mazzolai, Guida della Maremma. Percorsi tra arte e natura, Florence, Le Lettere, 1997.
- Giuseppe Guerrini, Torri e castelli della provincia di Grosseto, Siena, Nuova Immagine, 1999.
- Carlo Citter, Guida agli edifici sacri della Maremma, Siena, Nuova Immagine, 2002.
