= Petricci =

- Frazione
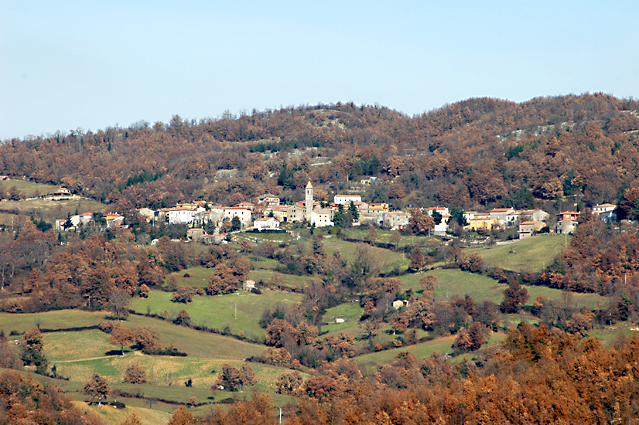
- View of Petricci

- Location of Petricci in Italy
- Coordinates: 42°45′31″N 11°33′25″E
- Country: Italy
- Region: Tuscany
- Province: Grosseto (GR)
- Comune: Semproniano
- Elevation: 732 m (2,402 ft)

Population (2011)
  - Total: 121
- Demonym: Petricciai
- Time zone: UTC+1 (CET)
  - Summer (DST): UTC+2 (CEST)
- Postal code: 58055
- Dialing code: (+39) 0564

Petricci is a village in Tuscany, central Italy, administratively a frazione of the comune of Semproniano, province of Grosseto. At the time of the 2001 census its population amounted to 168.

Petricci is about 55 km from Grosseto and 5 km from Semproniano. The village was founded in 1785 and it is divided into four borgate (hamlets): Il Crognolo, La Croce, La Macina and La Piana.

== Main sights ==
- Church of San Giuseppe (18th century), it is the main parish church of the village. The bell tower was built in 1881 and completed in 1925.
- Convent of San Giusto, situated outside the village, it's now in ruins.

== Bibliography ==
- Bruno Santi, Guida storico-artistica alla Maremma. Itinerari culturali nella provincia di Grosseto, Siena, Nuova Immagine, 1995, p. 244.
- Ippolito Corridori, Lorenzo Galeazzi, Petricci: un popolo, un territorio, 200 anni di storia, Siena, Il Leccio, 2006.
- Claudia Cinquemani Dragoni, Petricci, nel ruvido incanto di un paese di pietra, oltre gli occhi del Guardiano, in "Le Antiche Dogane", Montemerano, Aldo Sara Editore, April 2010.

== See also ==
- Catabbio
- Cellena
- Rocchette di Fazio
- Semproniano
