= Marsiliana =

Marsiliana Marsiliana d'Albegna
- Frazione
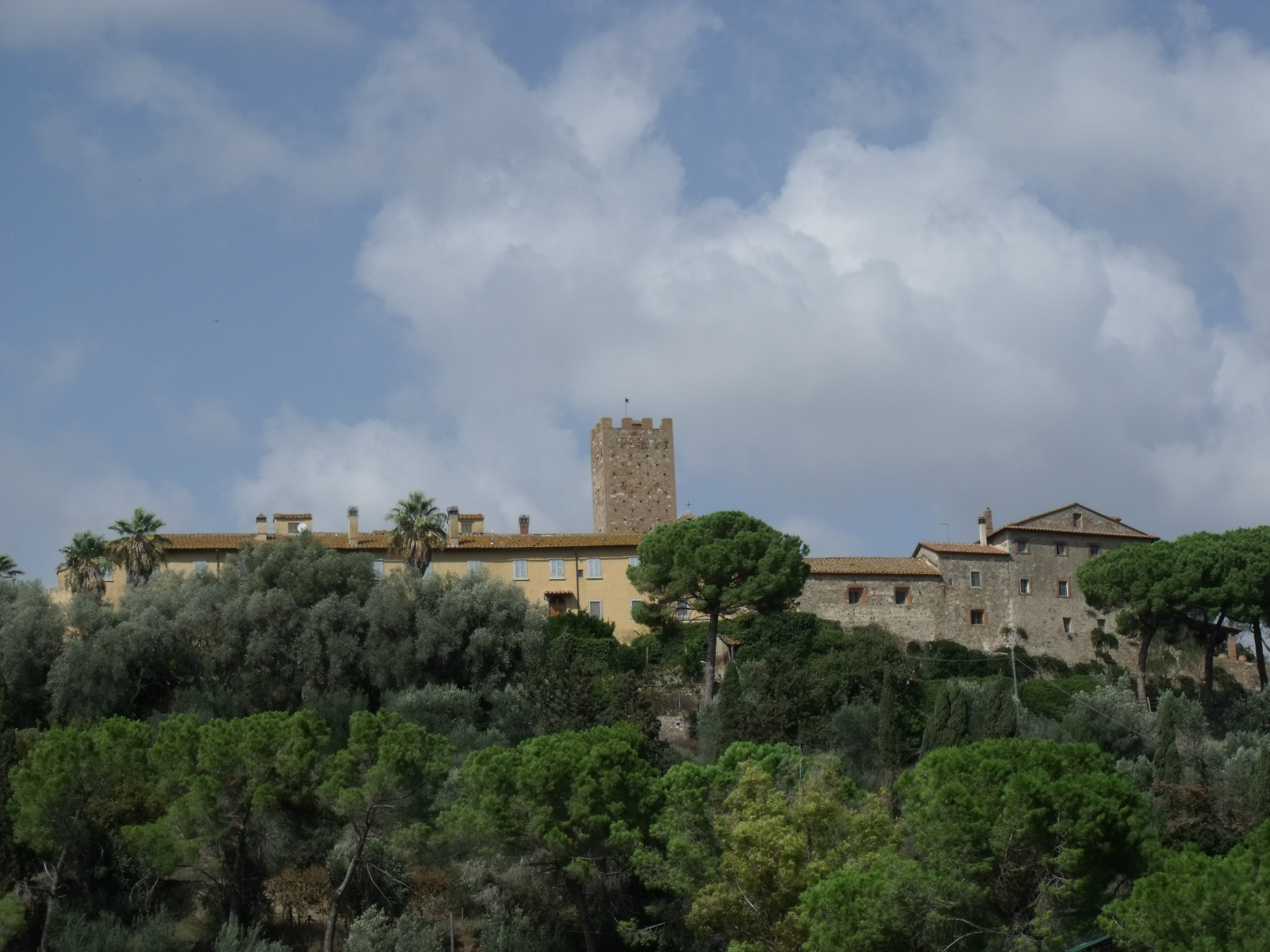
- View of the farm of Marsiliana

- Location of Marsiliana in Italy
- Coordinates: 42°32′12″N 11°20′32″E
- Country: Italy
- Region: Tuscany
- Province: Grosseto (GR)
- Comune: Manciano
- Elevation: 32 m (105 ft)

Population (2011)
  - Total: 413
- Demonym: Marsilianesi
- Time zone: UTC+1 (CET)
  - Summer (DST): UTC+2 (CEST)
- Postal code: 58050

Marsiliana, known also as Marsiliana d'Albegna, is a village in Tuscany, central Italy, administratively a frazione of the comune of Manciano, province of Grosseto. At the time of the 2001 census its population amounted to 246.

== Geography ==
Marsiliana is about 40 km from Grosseto and 18 km from Manciano. It is situated in southern Maremma, along the Maremmana Regional Road halfway between Manciano and the Tyrrhenian Sea at Albinia. The old centre of Marsiliana is situated on the top of a hill overlooking the river Albegna.

== History ==
The territory of Marsiliana is known for the presence of Etruscan archaeological sites: the most important one is the area of Banditella, where a necropolis of more than one hundred tombs (8th–6th century BC) was discovered in 1908.

After World War II, in connection with the land reform launched in Maremma in 1951, the area at the foot of the castle was selected for the construction of a modern service village through the expropriation of the large Corsini estate. The village was designed by architect Antonio Provenzano between 1954 and 1958 and described as "the most elaborate and balanced of all the villages built in Maremma during the 1950s". The design features a slender church elevated on a podium-square, an adjacent social building, a rear building for commercial use with a slightly curvilinear plan, and the extensive and unifying use of porticoes.

== Buildings ==
- Maria Regina del Mondo, main parish church of the village, it was built in 1959 and designed by Antonio Provenzano.
- Farm of Marsiliana (12th century), old castle built by the Aldobrandeschi, it was then held by the Republic of Siena and then by the Medicis. It became a property of the Corsini family from Florence in the 18th century and they transformed the building into a fortified farmhouse. Next to the farm there is the chapel of Sant'Antonio Abate.
- Castle of Stachilagi (12th century), ancient fortification built by the Aldobrandeschi, it's now in ruins.

== Education ==
Public education in Marsiliana is provided by the "Pietro Aldi" Institute of Manciano. The village hosts a nursery school and a primary school on Via delle Scuole, as well as a middle school on Via Borgo.

== Bibliography ==
- (in Italian) Emanuele Repetti, «Marsiliana», Dizionario Geografico Fisico Storico della Toscana, 1833–1846.
- Antonio Minto, Marsiliana d'Albegna. Le scoperte archeologiche del principe don Tommaso Corsini, Florence, 1921.
- Andrea Camilli, Alice del Re, Carmine Sanchirico, Alessandra Pecci, Lucia Salvini, Elena Santoro, Andrea Zifferero, Evoluzione e caratteri del paesaggio protostorico ed etrusco a Marsiliana d'Albegna (Manciano, GR), in Nuccia Negroni Catacchio, Paesaggi reali e paesaggi mentali. Ricerche e scavi. Preistoria e protostoria in Etruria, Atti VIII, Milan, 2008, pp. 195–210.

== See also ==
- Montemerano
- Poderi di Montemerano
- Poggio Capanne
- Poggio Murella
- San Martino sul Fiora
- Saturnia
