= Cellena =

- Frazione
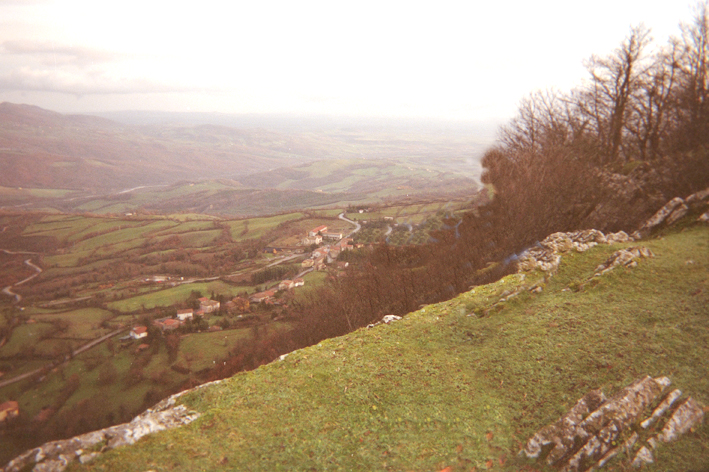
- View of Cellena

- Location of Cellena in Italy
- Coordinates: 42°45′44″N 11°33′59″E
- Country: Italy
- Region: Tuscany
- Province: Grosseto (GR)
- Comune: Semproniano
- Elevation: 691 m (2,267 ft)

Population (2011)
  - Total: 70
- Demonym: Cellenesi
- Time zone: UTC+1 (CET)
  - Summer (DST): UTC+2 (CEST)
- Postal code: 58050
- Dialing code: (+39) 0564

Cellena is a village in Tuscany, central Italy, administratively a frazione of the comune of Semproniano, province of Grosseto. At the time of the 2001 census its population amounted to 77.

== Geography ==
Cellena is about 54 km from Grosseto and 6 km from Semproniano. The village is divided into four hamlets: Cellena, Case Leoni, Case Perugini and Case Pietrini.

== Main sights ==
- Church of Santissima Annunziata, main parish church of the village, it was built in 1787 and entirely re-built in 1958.
- Corte Vecchia: ancient Etruscan settlement, it became a small burgh in the Early Middle Ages and it gave shelter to the troops of Frederick II Hohenstaufen during the siege of Sovana. In the Renaissance it was transformed into a farm estate with a villa and a giardino all'italiana. There is also a chapel which was the parish church (pieve) of Cellena before the edification of the modern church in the 18th century.

== Bibliography ==
- Aldo Mazzolai, Guida della Maremma. Percorsi tra arte e natura, Florence, Le Lettere, 1997.
- Giuseppe Guerrini, Torri e castelli della provincia di Grosseto, Siena, Nuova Immagine Editrice, 1999.

== See also ==
- Catabbio
- Petricci
- Rocchette di Fazio
- Semproniano
