= Semproniano =

- Comune
- Comune di Semproniano
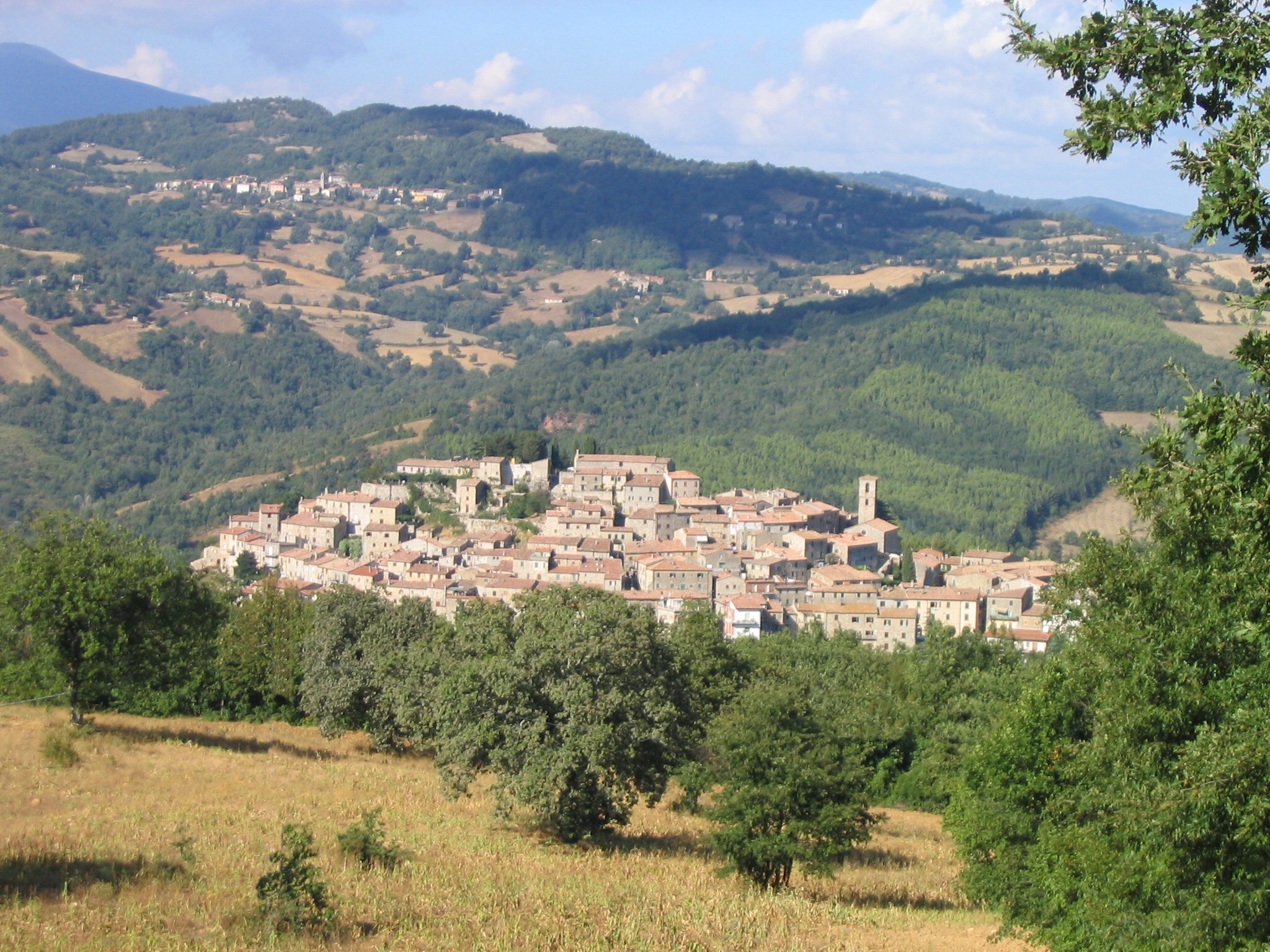
- Panorama of Semproniano

- Coat of arms

- Location within Italy Location within Tuscany
- Coordinates: 42°43′N 11°32′E
- Country: Italy
- Region: Tuscany
- Province: Grosseto (GR)
- Frazioni: Catabbio, Cellena, Petricci, Rocchette di Fazio

Government
  - Mayor: Luciano Petrucci

Area
  - Total: 81.65 km^{2} (31.53 sq mi)
- Elevation: 622 m (2,041 ft)

Population (31 December 2016)
  - Total: 1,059
  - Density: 12.97/km^{2} (33.59/sq mi)
- Demonym: Sempronianesi
- Time zone: UTC+1 (CET)
  - Summer (DST): UTC+2 (CEST)
- Postal code: 58055
- Dialing code: 0564
- Patron saint: Sts Vincenzo and Anastasio
- Website: Official website

Semproniano is a comune (municipality) in the Province of Grosseto in the Italian region of Tuscany, about 120 kilometres (75 mi) south of Florence and about 35 kilometres (22 mi) east of Grosseto.

Semproniano borders the following municipalities: Castell'Azzara, Manciano, Roccalbegna, Santa Fiora, Sorano.

== Frazioni ==
The municipality consists of the municipal seat of Semproniano and the villages of (frazioni) of Catabbio, Cellena, Petricci and Rocchette di Fazio.

== Government ==
=== List of mayors ===
Mayor	Term start	Term end	Party
Luciano Petrucci	1993	2003	Independent (centre-right)
Gianni Bellini	2003	2013	Independent (centre-right)
Miranda Brugi	2013	2018	Independent (centre-left)
Luciano Petrucci	2018	Incumbent	Independent (centre-right)

== Main sights ==
- The medieval Palazzo Civico and Palazzo dei Vicari Mediceo
- Church of Santa Croce, faced by the remains of the Aldobrandeschi castle (Rocca).
- The 12th century (renamed in the 16th century) Pieve dei Santi Vincenzo e Anastasio.
- Castle of Catabbio, built in the 12th century by the Aldobrandeschi and later used by the Orsini of Pitigliano
- Medieval burgh of Rocchette di Fazio.
