= Montemerano =

- Frazione
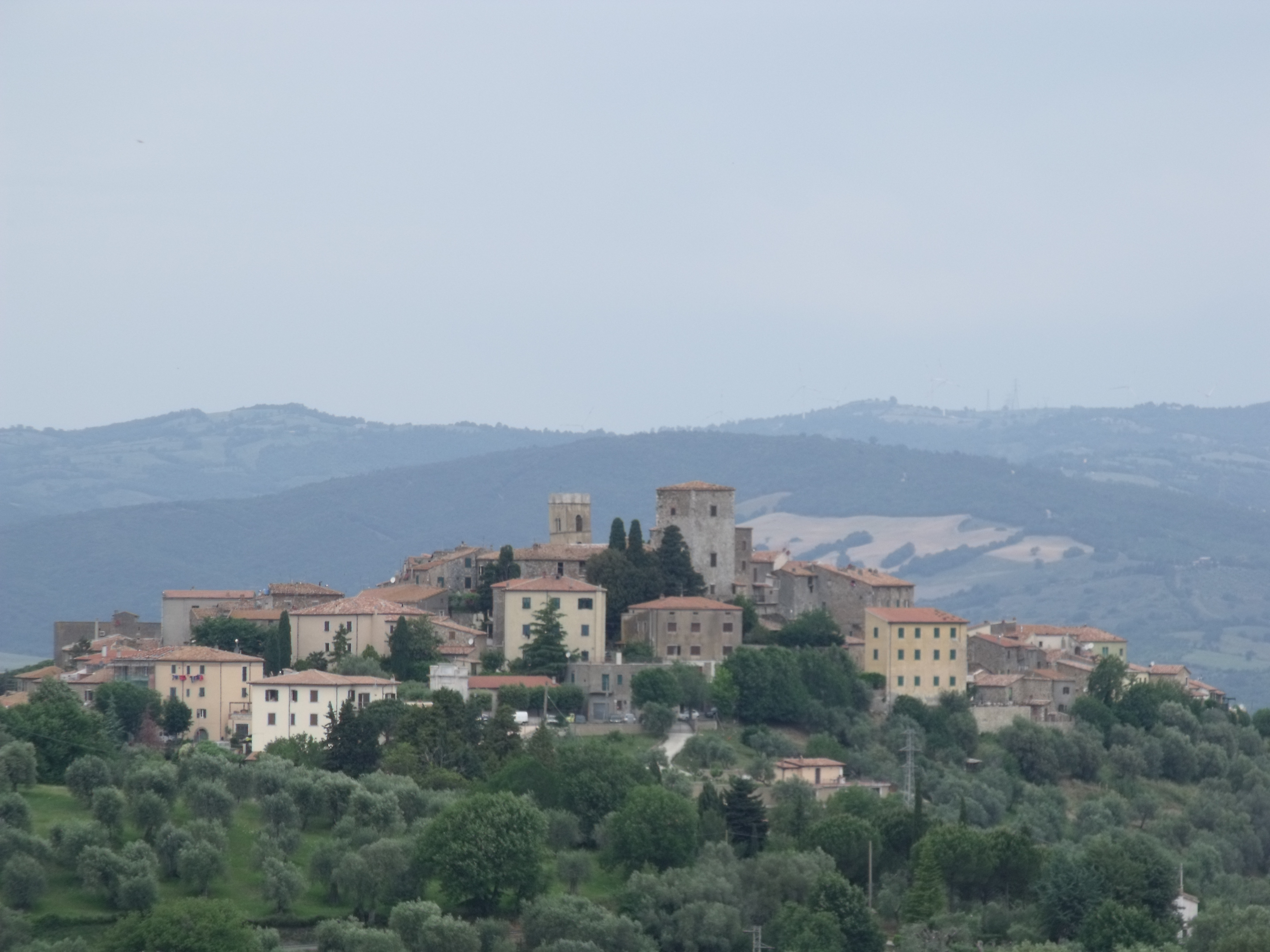
- View of Montemerano

- Location of Montemerano in Italy
- Coordinates: 42°37′18″N 11°29′25″E
- Country: Italy
- Region: Tuscany
- Province: Grosseto (GR)
- Comune: Manciano
- Elevation: 286 m (938 ft)

Population (2011)
  - Total: 487
- Demonym: Montemeranesi
- Time zone: UTC+1 (CET)
  - Summer (DST): UTC+2 (CEST)
- Postal code: 58050

Montemerano is a village in Tuscany, central Italy, administratively a frazione of the comune of Manciano, province of Grosseto. At the time of the 2001 census its population amounted to 438. It is one of I Borghi più belli d'Italia ("The most beautiful villages of Italy").

== Geography ==
Montemerano is about 48 km from Grosseto and 6 km from Manciano, and it is situated on a hill along the Provincial Road which links Scansano to Manciano.

== History ==
The village dates back to the Middle Ages, when it was a property of the Aldobrandeschi family (13th century) and then of the Baschi from Orvieto (14th century). It was then conquered by the Republic of Siena during the 15th century.

== Main sights ==
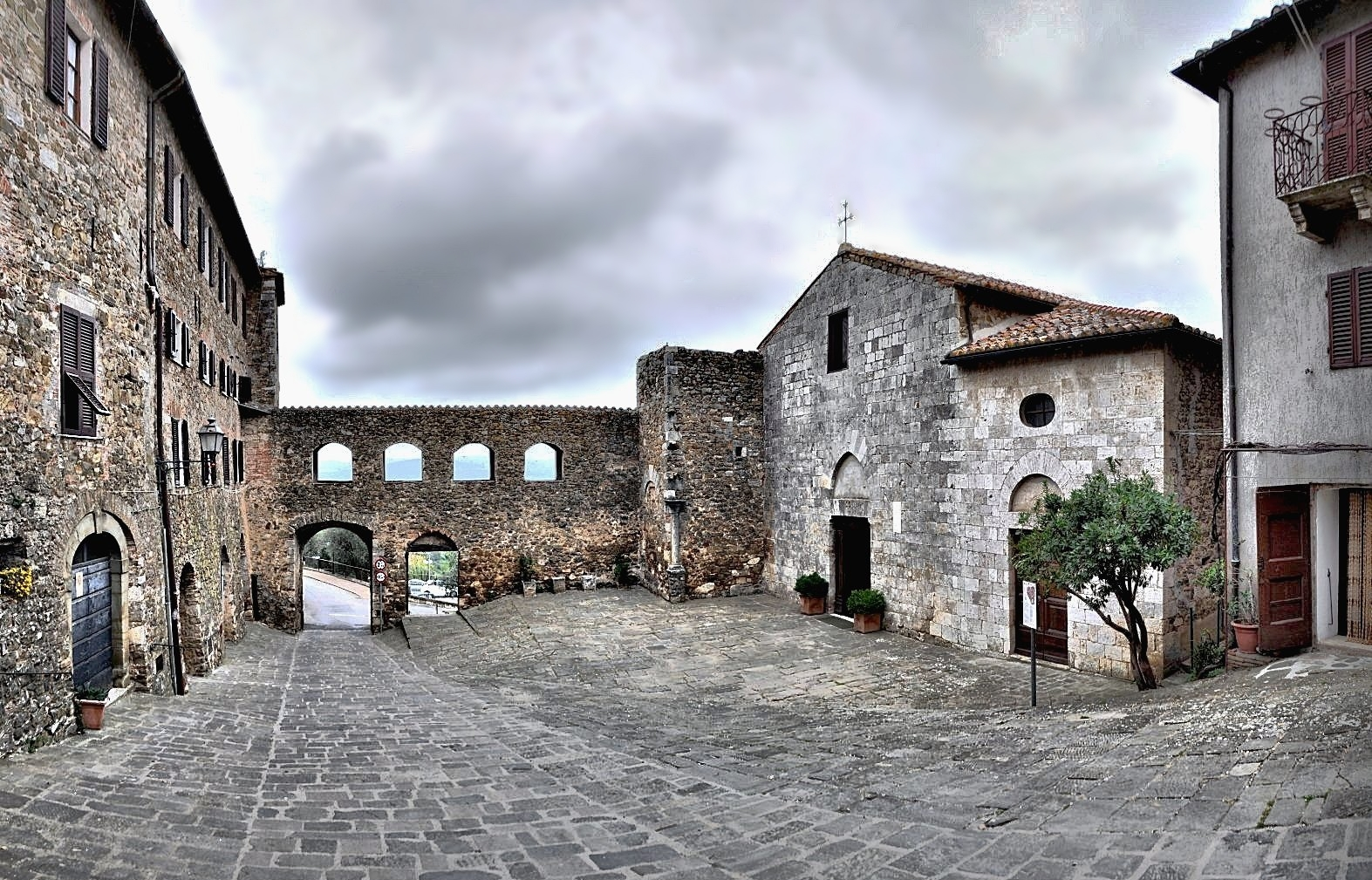
The church of San Giorgio

- San Giorgio (14th century), main parish church of the village, it was built by the Baschi and expanded in 1430. It was restored in 1980. The church contains a Madonna in trono col Bambino e santi by Sano di Pietro (15th century) and the curious Madonna della Gattaiola (Virgin Mary of the cat flap) by the local artist known only as Maestro di Montemerano (The Master from Montemerano).
- Pieve di San Lorenzo (12th century), former parish church of the village, it is the oldest building in Montemerano, as mentioned in an act of 1188. It was deconsecrated and now it is used for cultural activities.
- Madonna del Cavalluzzo (15th century), it was built as a chapel and then restructured in the 17th century.
- Walls of Montemerano, old fortifications which surround the village since 13th century. The walls have three gates: Porta di San Giorgio, Porta Romana and Porta Grossetana.

== Bibliography ==
- Bruno Santi, Guida storico-artistica alla Maremma. Itinerari culturali nella provincia di Grosseto, Nuova Immagine, Siena, 1995, pp. 292–301.
- Giuseppe Guerrini, Torri e castelli della provincia di Grosseto, Nuova Immagine Editrice, Siena, 1999.

== See also ==
- Marsiliana
- Poderi di Montemerano
- Poggio Capanne
- Poggio Murella
- San Martino sul Fiora
- Saturnia
