= Saturnia =

- Frazione
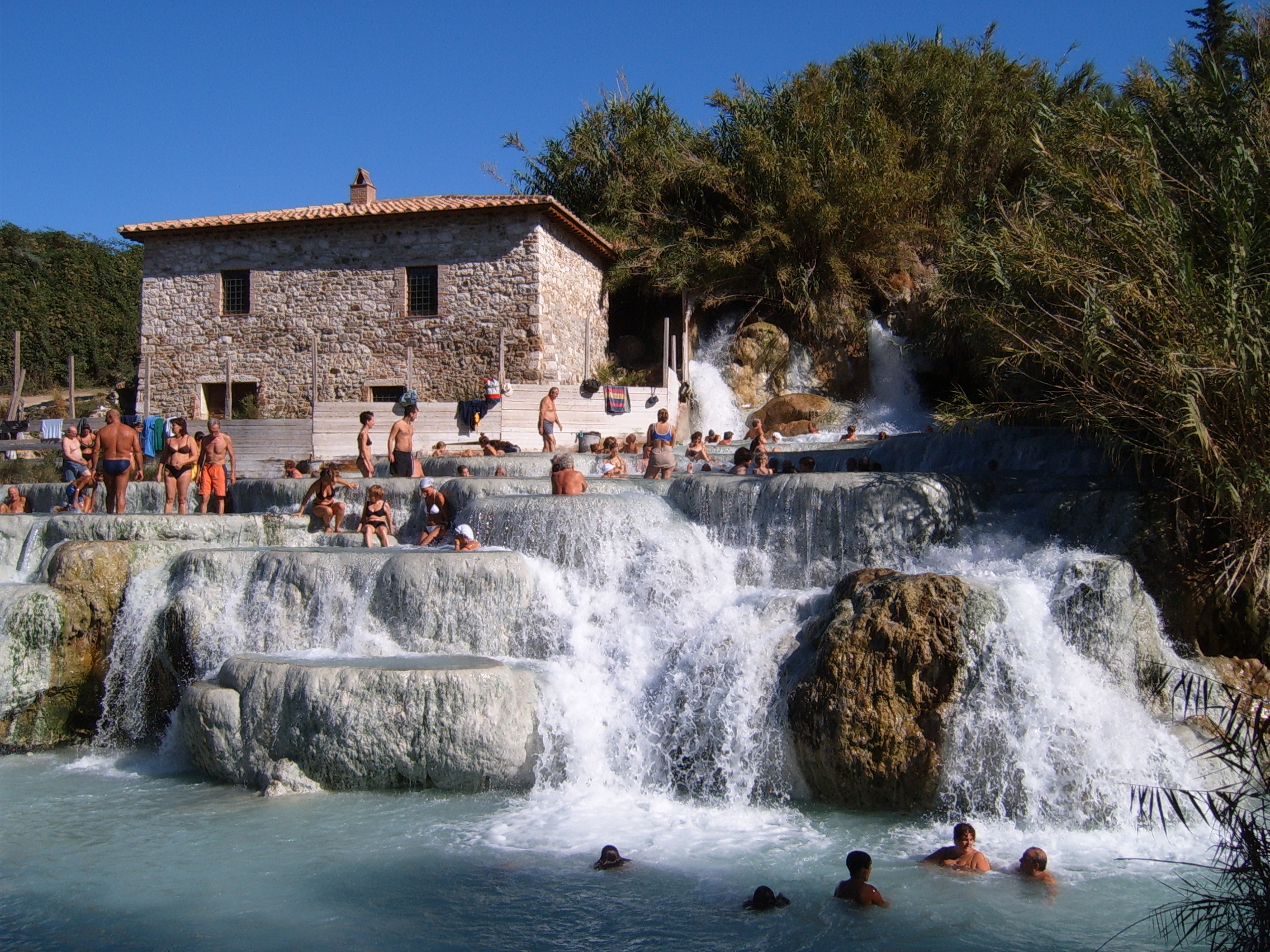
- Cascate del Mulino (Mill waterfalls)

- Location of Saturnia in Italy
- Coordinates: 42°39′59″N 11°30′15″E
- Country: Italy
- Region: Tuscany
- Province: Grosseto (GR)
- Comune: Manciano
- Elevation: 294 m (965 ft)

Population (2010)
  - Total: 280
- Time zone: UTC+1 (CET)
  - Summer (DST): UTC+2 (CEST)
- Postal code: 58050
- Dialing code: 0564

Saturnia (Italian: [saˈturnja]) is a spa town in Tuscany in central Italy that has been inhabited since ancient times. It is a frazione of the comune of Manciano, in the province of Grosseto. Famous for the spa which gives it its name, its population is 280.

== Geography ==
It lies about 14 km (8.7 mi) from Manciano, 56 km (35 mi) from Grosseto, 37 km (23 mi) northeast of Orbetello and the coast and 115 km (71 mi) from Rome. Near the village, 800 L/s of sulphurous water at 37 °C gushes over a waterfall and down into a cascade of natural pools formed by the deposition of calcareous rock from evaporation of the water.

== History ==
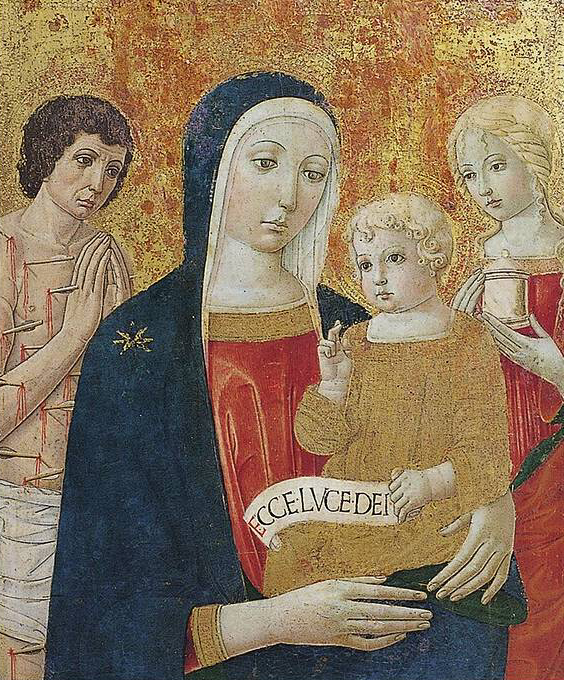
Fresco attributed to Benvenuto di Giovanni at the Church of Santa Maria Maddalena, Saturnia

Saturnia, which until 30BC was known as Aurinia, takes its name from the Roman god Saturn (or Saturnus). Legend has it that he grew tired of the constant wars of humans, and sent a thunderbolt to earth that created a magic spring of warm sulphurous water which would pacify mankind.

Dionysius of Halicarnassus lists Saturnia as one of the towns first occupied by the Pelasgi and then by the Etruscan civilization. A Roman colony arrived in 183 BC, but little is known about it other than the fact that it was a prefecture. There are still remains of the city walls, in the polygonal style, which contain Roman gateways. Roman remains have also been discovered within the town, and remains of tombs outside. These tombs were originally covered by tumuli, which have now disappeared, so that George Dennis, author of Cities and Cemeteries of Etruria, mistook them for megalithic remains.

In 1300, Saturnia became the hideout of outlaws and was razed to the ground by the Sienese. Forgotten for several centuries, Saturnia was rediscovered in the late 19th century when the land around the spring was drained and a spa built. Thousands of visitors come to bathe in the waters to this day.

== Main sights ==
=== Church of Santa Maria Maddalena ===
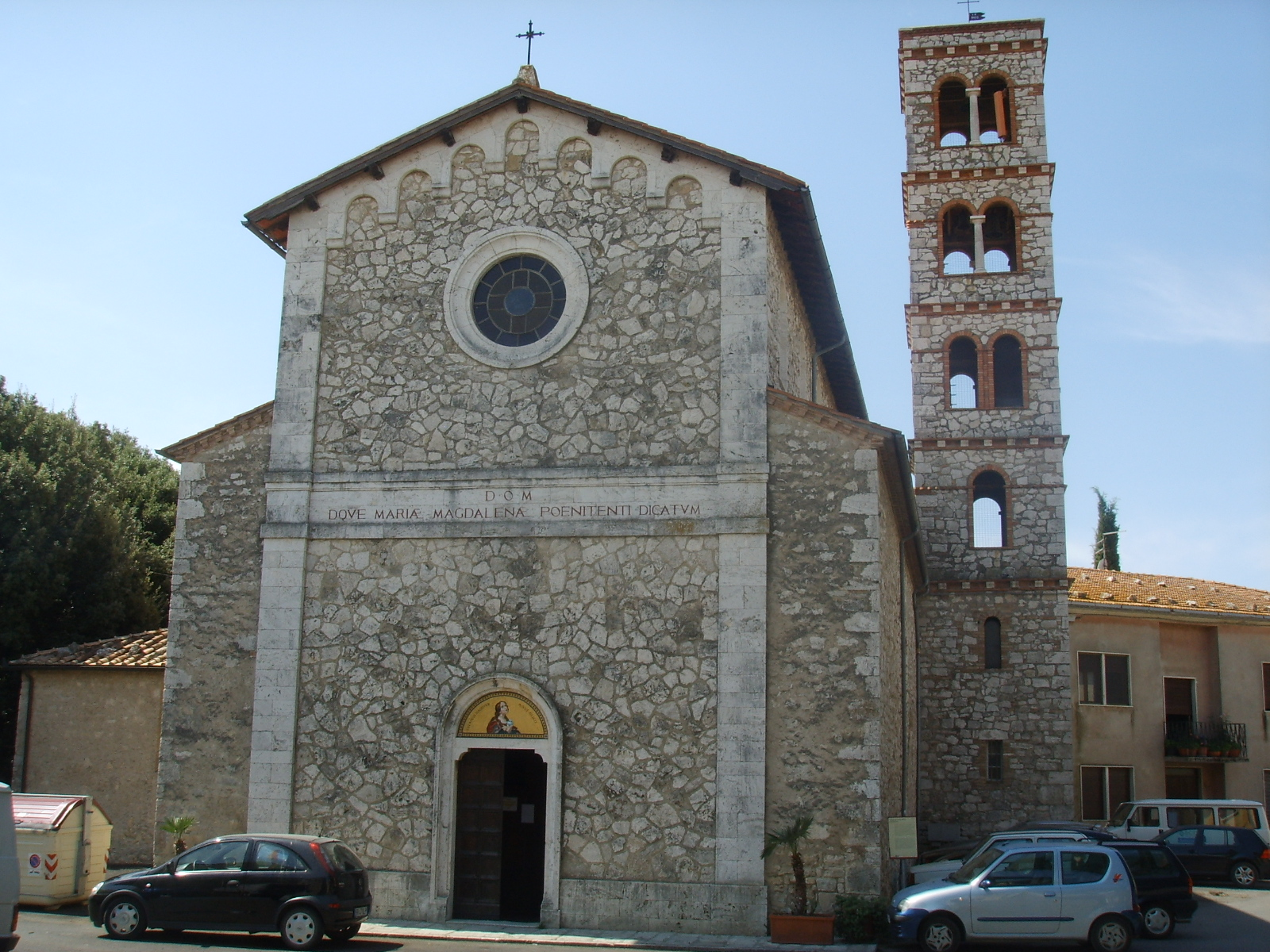
Church of Santa Maria Maddalena

The Church of Santa Maria Maddalena is the main church in Saturnia. The earliest historical records related to the church date back to 1188, but the current building is due to a restoration of 1933.

The church holds the famous Madonna and Child fresco attributed to Benvenuto di Giovanni at the end of the 15th century.

=== Other sights ===
- Rocca Aldobrandesca
- Saturnia Walls (Mura di Saturnia)
- Roman Gate (Porta Romana)
- Archaeological museum

== Gallery ==
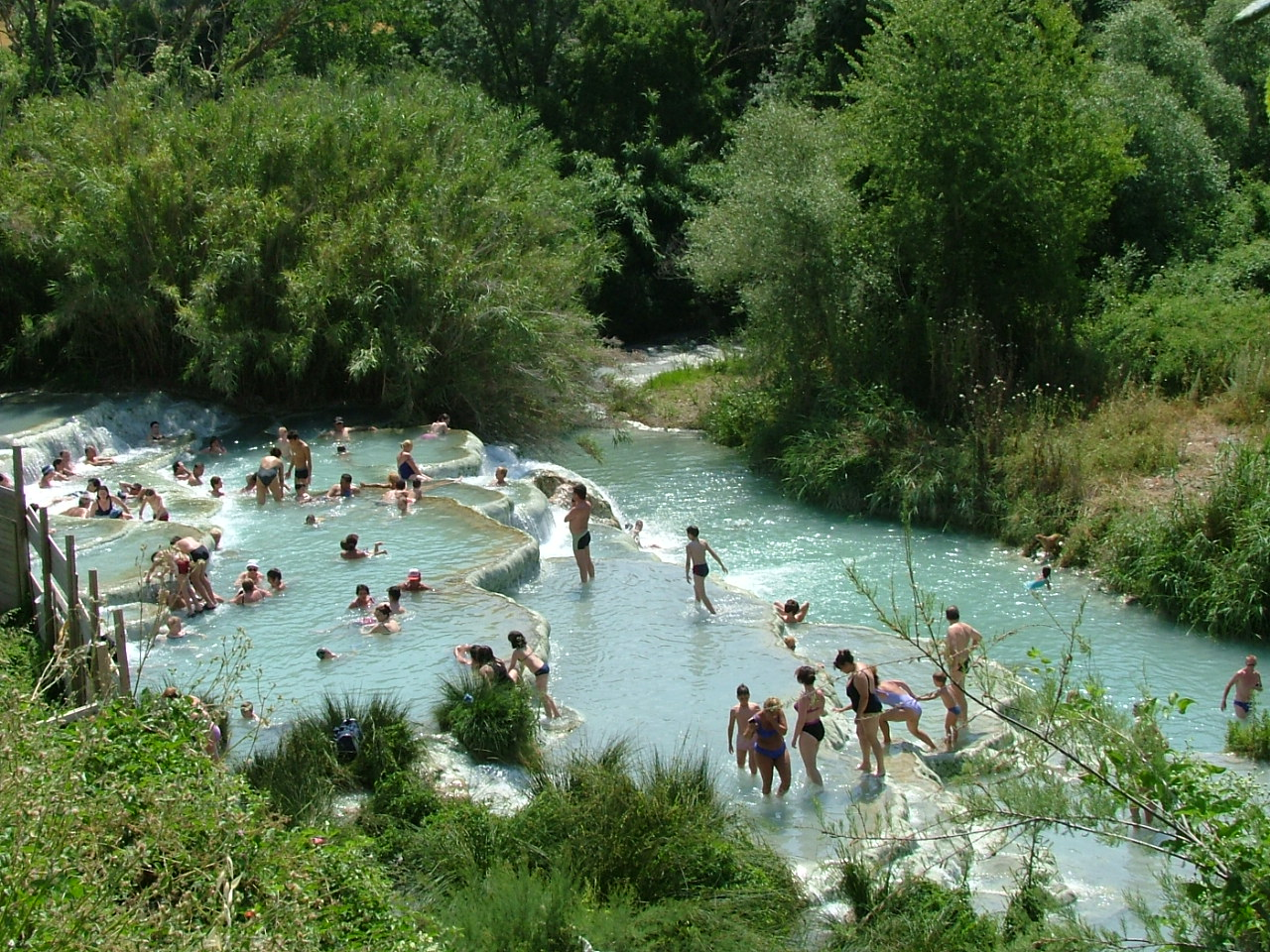
Saturnia hot stream

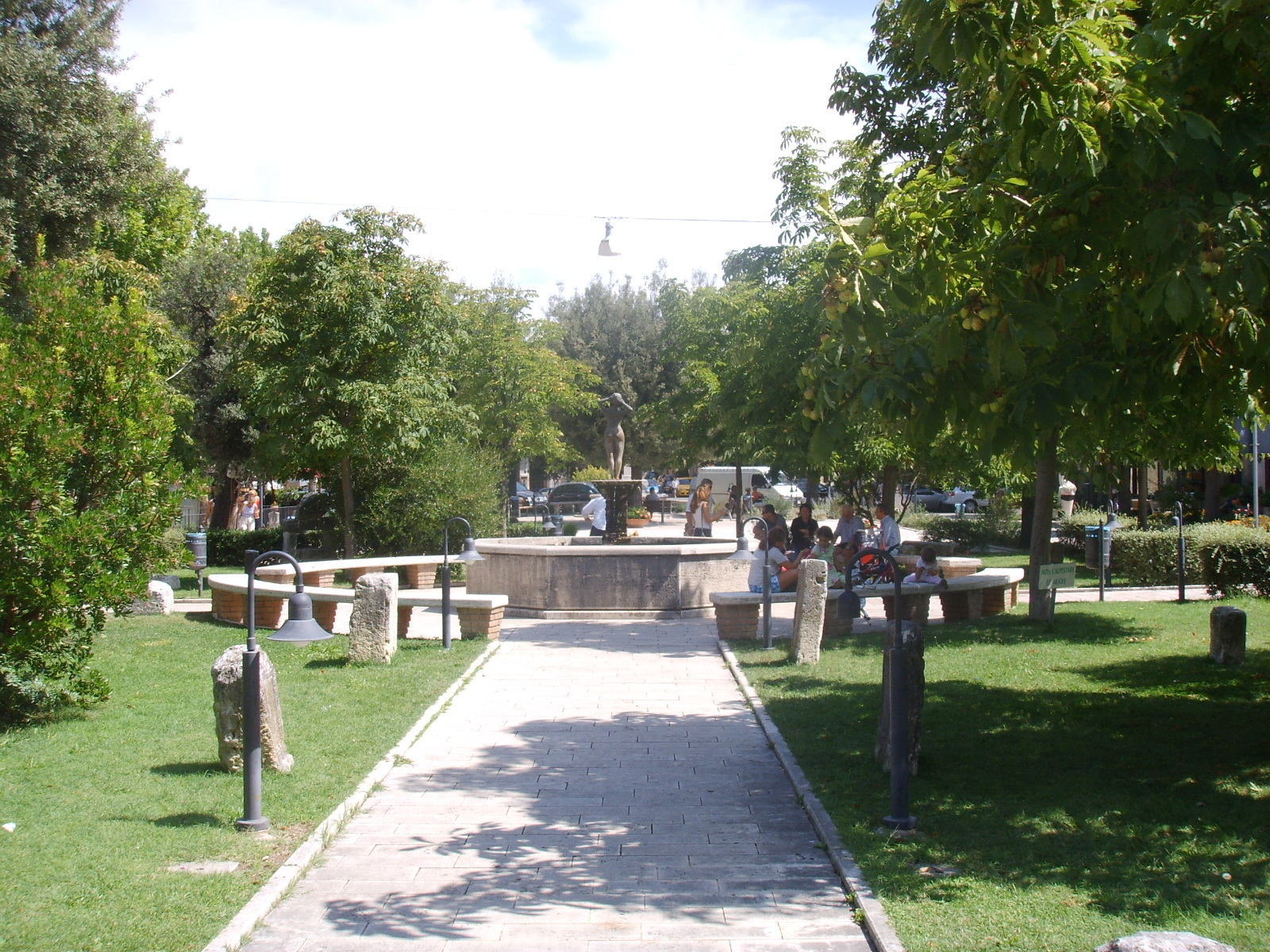
Village square

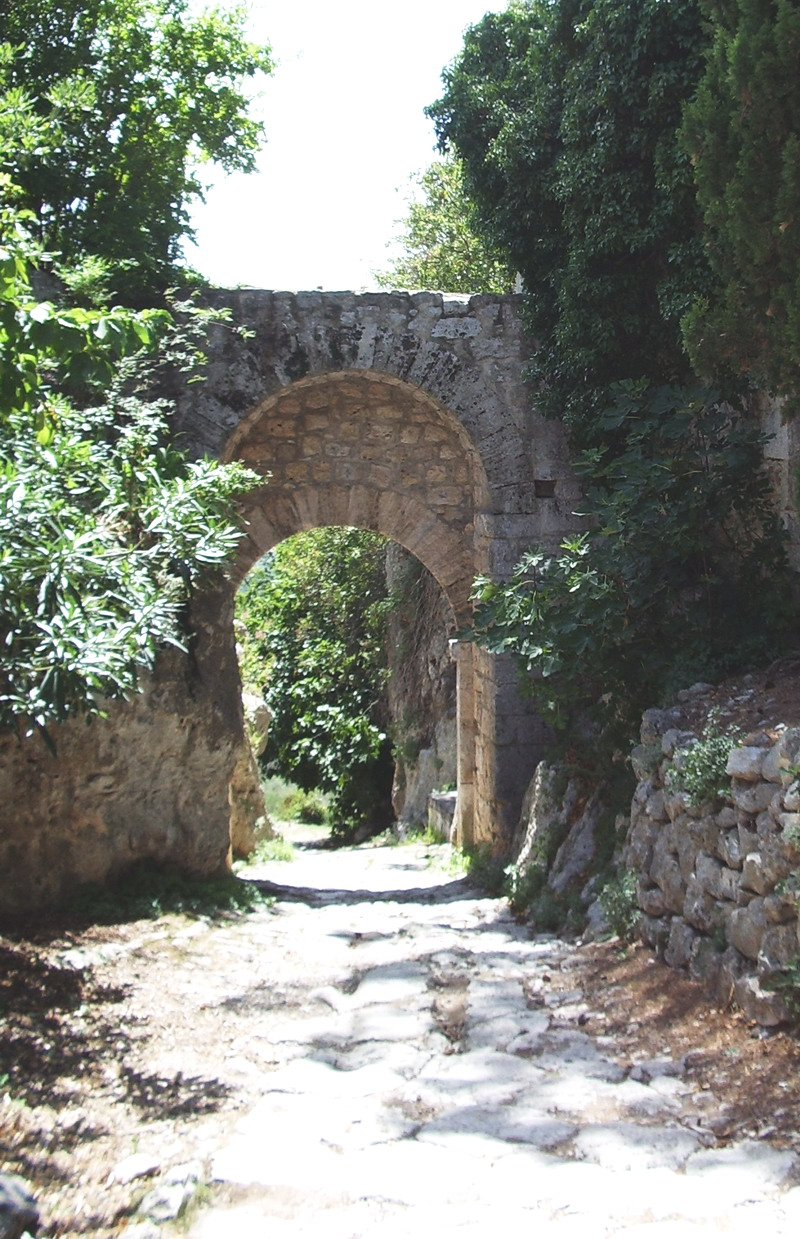
Roman gate on the Via Clodia

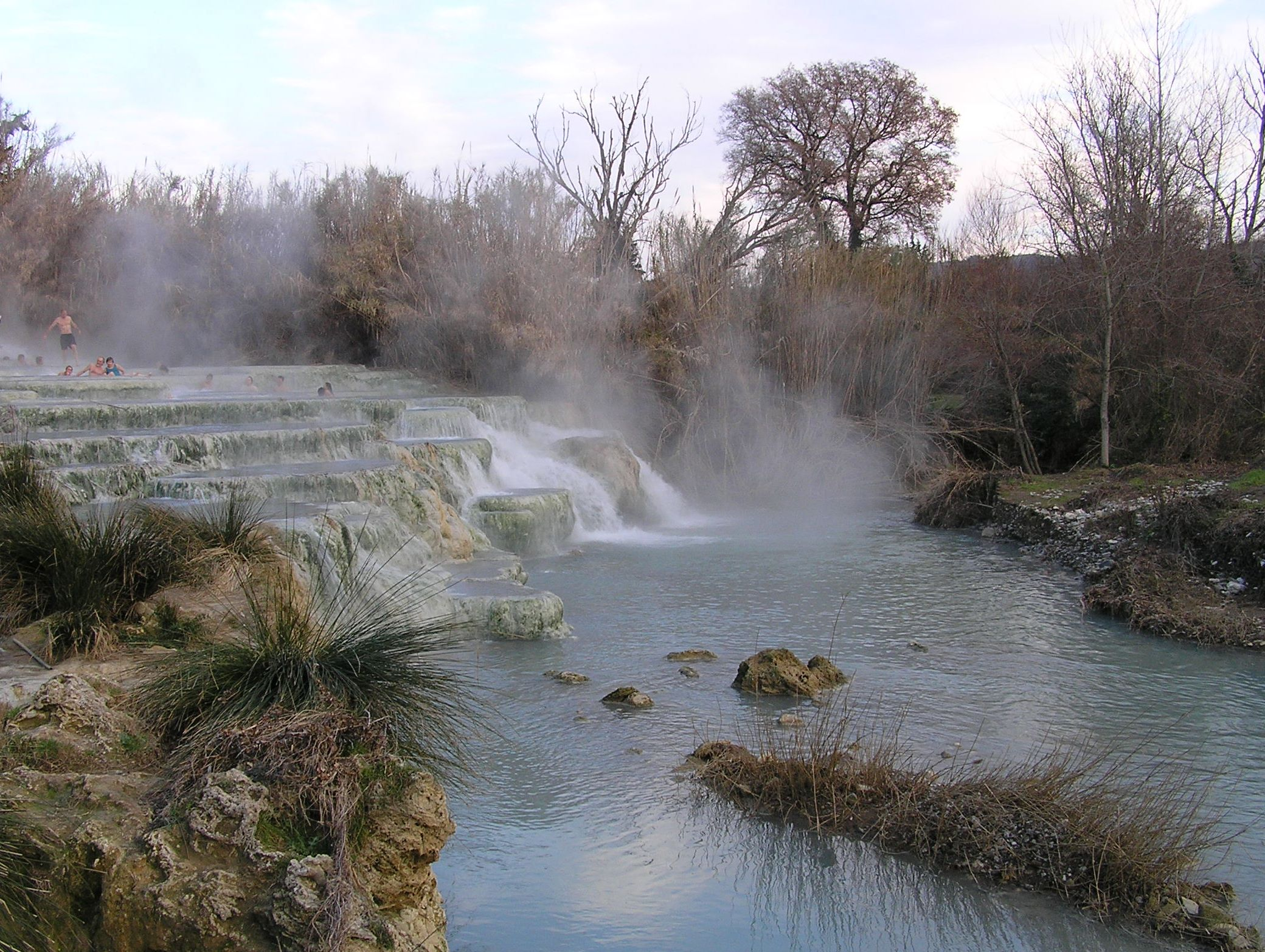
Gorello waterfall

== See also ==
- Marsiliana
- Montemerano
- Poderi di Montemerano
- Poggio Capanne
- Poggio Murella
- San Martino sul Fiora

Similar places

- Geothermal areas of Yellowstone in the USA
- Pamukkale in Turkey
- Huanglong Scenic and Historic Interest Area in China
- Badab-e Surt in Iran
- Pink and White Terraces in New Zealand were similar travertine terraces until they were covered in a volcanic eruption. The Pink and White Terrace locations were finally mapped by researchers in 2017.
