= Manciano =

- Comune
- Comune di Manciano
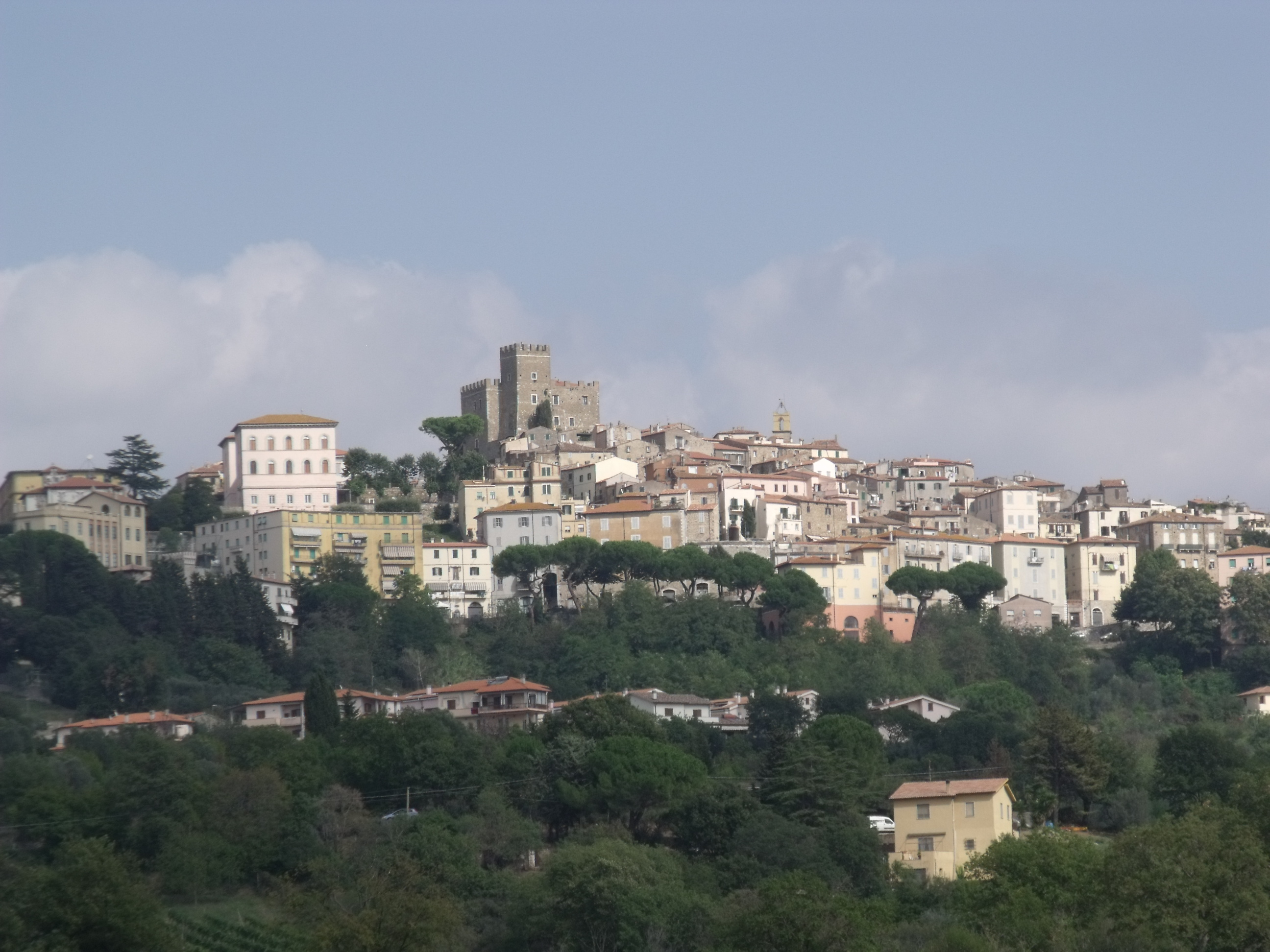
- View of Manciano

- Flag Coat of arms

- Location within Italy Location within Tuscany
- Coordinates: 42°35′20″N 11°31′01″E
- Country: Italy
- Region: Tuscany
- Province: Grosseto (GR)
- Frazioni: Marsiliana, Montemerano, Poderi di Montemerano, Poggio Capanne, Poggio Murella, San Martino sul Fiora, Saturnia

Government
  - Mayor: Mirco Morini

Area
  - Total: 372.51 km^{2} (143.83 sq mi)
- Elevation: 444 m (1,457 ft)

Population (31 August 2020)
  - Total: 7,239
  - Density: 19.43/km^{2} (50.33/sq mi)
- Demonym: Mancianesi
- Time zone: UTC+1 (CET)
  - Summer (DST): UTC+2 (CEST)
- Postal code: 58014
- Dialing code: 0564
- Patron saint: St. Leonard
- Saint day: November 6
- Website: Official website

Manciano is a town and comune in the southern part of the province of Grosseto, Tuscany, central Italy. It has a population of about 7,200.

Manciano is 18 kilometres (11 mi) southwest of Pitigliano and 40 kilometres (25 mi) northeast of Orbetello.

== History ==
Manciano was once a fairly important market town for the area of the Albegna and Fiora valleys, with a stronghold already recorded in the twelfth century. A brief occupation by Siena (1419–55) left the town an imposing fortress built around 1424.

== Government ==
=== Frazioni ===
The municipality is formed by the municipal seat of Manciano and the villages (frazioni) of:

- Marsiliana
- Montemerano
- Poderi di Montemerano
- Poggio Capanne
- Poggio Murella
- San Martino sul Fiora
- Saturnia.

== Main sights ==
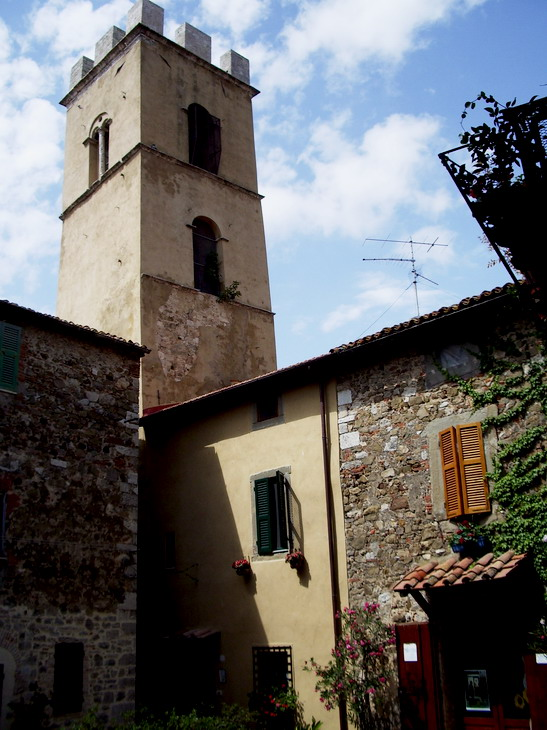
Torre di San Lorenzo.

The most important site in the comune is Saturnia, an old Etruscan town with medieval walls, remains of a Roman road, and best known for its thermal springs dating to the Roman period and still in use today. The comune is further known to students of Late Antiquity as the place where the famous silver platter of Ardabur Aspar, consul in 434, was found (in the Fosso Castione, a creek near Marsiliana).

The densely built town centre of the frazione Montemerano, crowned by its leaning tower of San Lorenzo, is contained within its ancient walls. Montemerano became a power center of the signori dei Baschi, who dominated the comune. The thirteenth-century church is dedicated to San Lorenzo; frescoes remain on its walls, and a polyptych by the Sienese painter Sano di Pietro. At a short distance, in open countryside, there is the church of Madonna del Castuzzo.

== See also ==
- Saturnia
- Terme di Saturnia
- Pietro Aldi
