= Frassine =

- Frazione
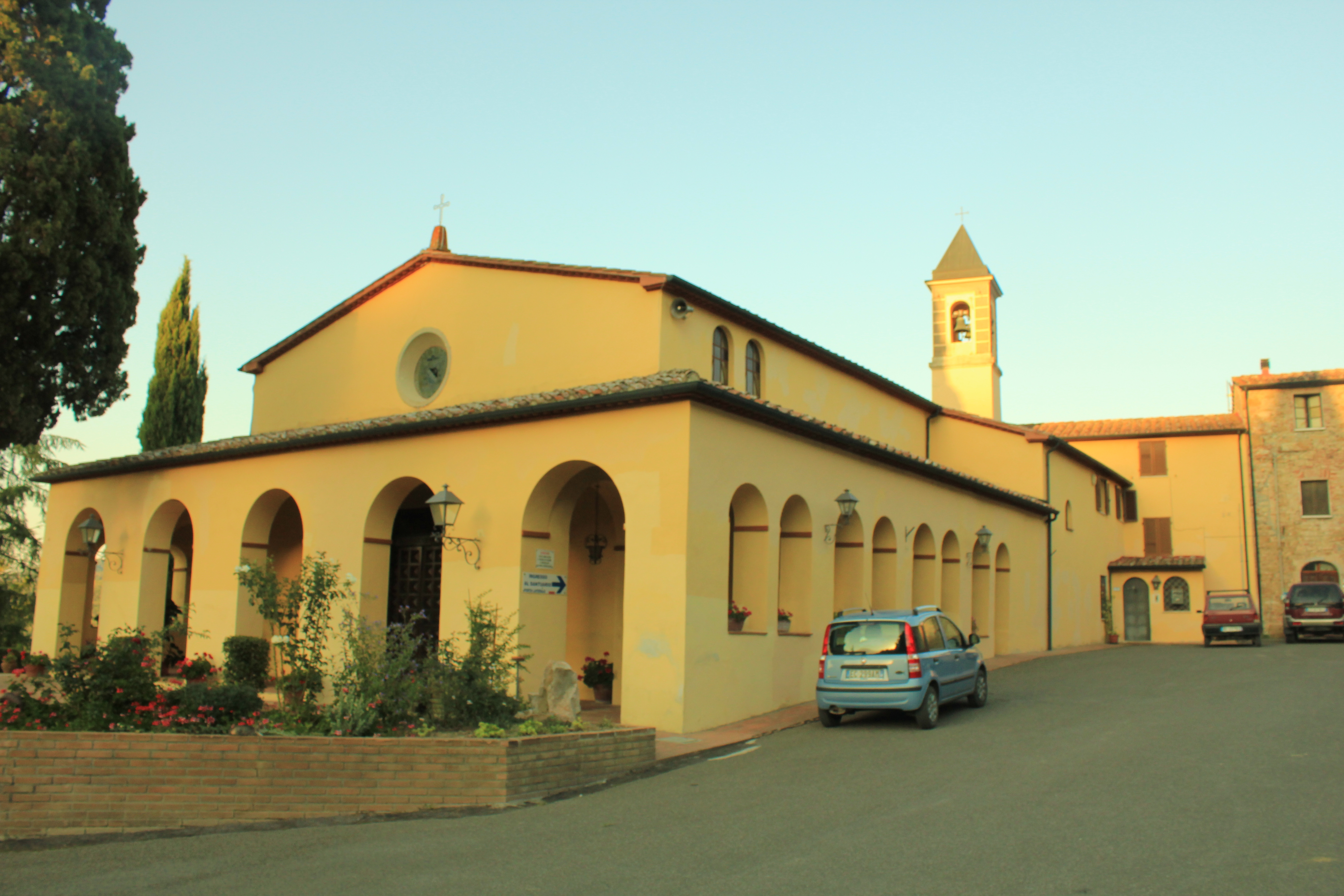
- The sanctuary of Madonna del Frassine

- Location of Frassine in Italy
- Coordinates: 43°7′1″N 10°45′58″E
- Country: Italy
- Region: Tuscany
- Province: Grosseto (GR)
- Comune: Monterotondo Marittimo
- Elevation: 168 m (551 ft)

Population (2011)
  - Total: 53
- Demonym(s): Frassetani, Frassinai
- Time zone: UTC+1 (CET)
  - Summer (DST): UTC+2 (CEST)
- Postal code: 58025
- Dialing code: (+39) 0564

Frassine is a village in Tuscany, central Italy. It is administratively a frazione of the comune of Monterotondo Marittimo, province of Grosseto, in the area of Colline Metallifere. At the time of the 2001 census its population amounted to 26.

Frassine is about 68 km from Grosseto and 10 km from Monterotondo Marittimo, and it is situated along the Provincial Road which links Monterotondo with Suvereto and Campiglia Marittima.

The town's name derives from the frequent occurrence of ash trees (Latin fraxinus, Italian frassino).

== Main sights ==
- Sanctuary of Madonna del Frassine (16th century), main church of the village, it contains a sculpture of Mary brought from Africa by saint Cerbonius and saint Regulus
- San Regolo in Gualdo, now in ruins
- Bagno del Re (King's Bath), ancient building of 10th century, it's now in ruins

== See also ==
- Boracifero Lake
- Lago Boracifero, Monterotondo Marittimo
- Monterotondo Marittimo

== Bibliography ==
- Aldo Mazzolai, Guida della Maremma. Percorsi tra arte e natura, Le Lettere, Florence, 1997.
