= Poggio di Montieri =

Mountain in Italy

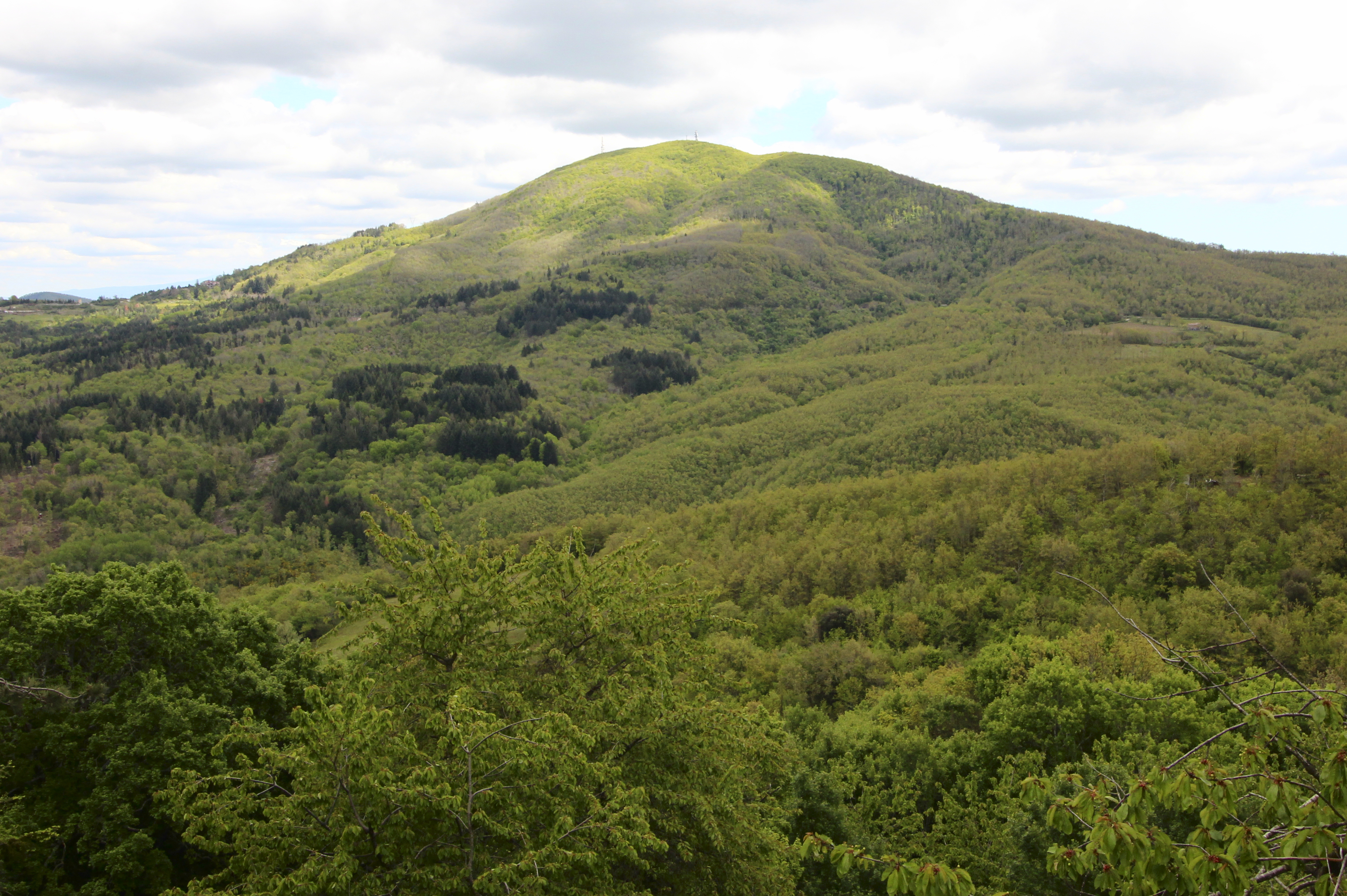

Highest point
- Elevation: 1,051 m (3,448 ft)
- Coordinates: 43°07′34″N 11°00′15″E

Geography
- Country: Italy
- Region: Tuscany
- Parent range: Colline Metallifere

The Poggio di Montieri is a mountain in the Colline Metallifere range.

== Description ==
Located in the Province of Grosseto, southwest of the town of Montieri, the peak rises to an elevation of 1,051 metres (3,448 ft) above sea level. It is the second-highest peak of the massif, just 9 metres lower than the nearby Cornate di Gerfalco.

The area is rich in mineral resources, which have been exploited since Etruscan times.
