= Mauro Tognoni =

Italian politician (1924–1996)

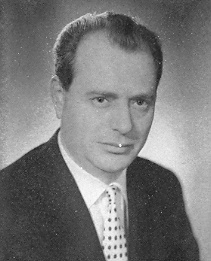

Member of the Chamber of Deputies
- In office 1953–1972

Member of the Provincial Council of Grosseto
- In office 1956–1960

Personal details
- Born: 8 November 1924 Boccheggiano, Montieri, Province of Grosseto, Kingdom of Italy
- Died: 2 April 1996 (aged 71)
- Party: Italian Communist Party
- Occupation: Trade unionist

Mauro Tognoni (8 November 1924 – 2 April 1996) was an Italian trade unionist and politician who served as a Deputy from 1953 to 1972.
