= Biagio Vecchioni =

Italian politician (1900–1972)

Federal secretary of Grosseto
- In office 10 April 1929 – 20 May 1934
- Preceded by: Ferdinando Pierazzi
- Succeeded by: Angelo Maestrini

Member of the Chamber of Deputies
- In office 1934–1939

Member of the Chamber of Fasces and Corporations
- In office 1939–1943

Personal details
- Born: 7 May 1900 Gerfalco, Montieri, Province of Grosseto, Kingdom of Italy
- Died: 21 January 1972 (aged 71) Verona, Veneto, Italy
- Party: National Fascist Party
- Occupation: Agronomist

Biagio Vecchioni (7 May 1900 – 21 January 1972) was an Italian agronomist and fascist politician, who served as federal secretary of Grosseto (1929–1934), deputy (1934–1939), and member of the Chamber of Fasces and Corporations (1939–1943). He also served as the second president of INFAIL (1939–1942).

== Life and career ==
Vecchioni was born in Gerfalco, Montieri, in the province of Grosseto, and became a leading figure in Maremma fascism. He served as federal secretary of Grosseto, podestà of Montieri, and a member of the Chamber of Deputies of the Kingdom of Italy from 1934. From April 1939 to 1942, he was president of INFAIL, the national institute for work-related injuries, the second person to hold the office.

After World War II, Vecchioni lived in Massa Marittima at the Cicalino estate and held several local leadership positions, including the first president of the Massa Marittima Rotary Club, president of the local mining institute, and vice-president of both the Grosseto Agricultural Consortium and the provincial farmers' union.

Vecchioni was married to Vittorina Francini and had two children. He died in Verona on 21 January 1972 and was buried in Massa Marittima.

== Sources ==
- Campagna, Stefano; Turbanti, Adolfo, eds. (2022). Antifascismo, guerra e resistenze in Maremma. Arcidosso: Effigi.
- Capitini Maccabruni, Nicla (1985). La Maremma contro il nazifascismo. Grosseto: La Commerciale.
- Galimi, Valeria, ed. (2018). Il fascismo a Grosseto. Figure e articolazioni del potere in provincia (1922-1938). Arcidosso: Effigi.
