= Travale =

- Frazione
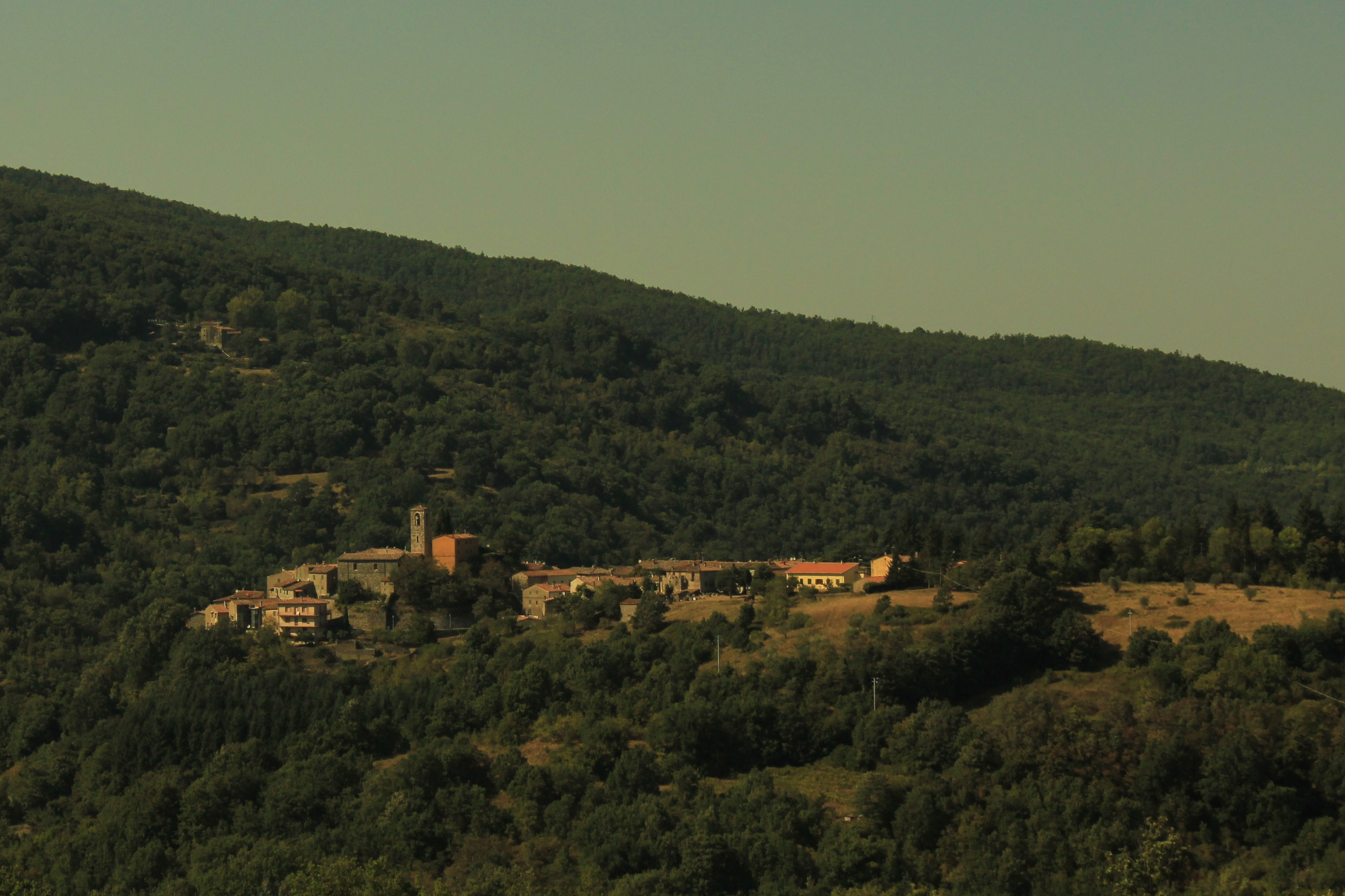
- View of Travale

- Location of Travale in Italy
- Coordinates: 43°10′2″N 11°00′30″E
- Country: Italy
- Region: Tuscany
- Province: Grosseto (GR)
- Comune: Montieri
- Elevation: 520 m (1,710 ft)

Population (2011)
  - Total: 59
- Demonym(s): Travalini, Travalesi
- Time zone: UTC+1 (CET)
  - Summer (DST): UTC+2 (CEST)
- Postal code: 58020
- Dialing code: (+39) 0564

Travale is a village in Tuscany, central Italy, administratively a frazione of the comune of Montieri, province of Grosseto, in the area of Colline Metallifere. At the time of the 2001 census its population amounted to 84.

Travale is about 60 km from Grosseto and 6 km from Montieri, and it is situated in the Natural Reserve of Cornate and Fosini.

== Main sights ==
- Santi Michele e Silvestro (14th century), main parish church of the village, it contained a Crocifisso of 13th century.
- Oratorio della Compagnia, ancient chapel of medieval origins, it is situated next to the main church.
- Walls of Travale, old fortifications which surround the village since 12th century.

== The guaita of Travale ==
The village is well known in philology and literature because of its guaita, a phrase reported in a document of 1158 («guaita guaita male, non mangiai ma' mezo pane»), said by Malfredo di Casamagi, keeper of the castle, complaining about the bad treatment of the guards, who were deprived even of bread. The sentence is considered one of the first known examples of Italian vernacular language.

== See also ==
- Boccheggiano
- Gerfalco
- Montieri

== Bibliography ==
- Aldo Mazzolai, Guida della Maremma. Percorsi tra arte e natura, Le Lettere, Florence, 1997.
