= Lago Boracifero, Monterotondo Marittimo =

Lago Boracifero
- Frazione
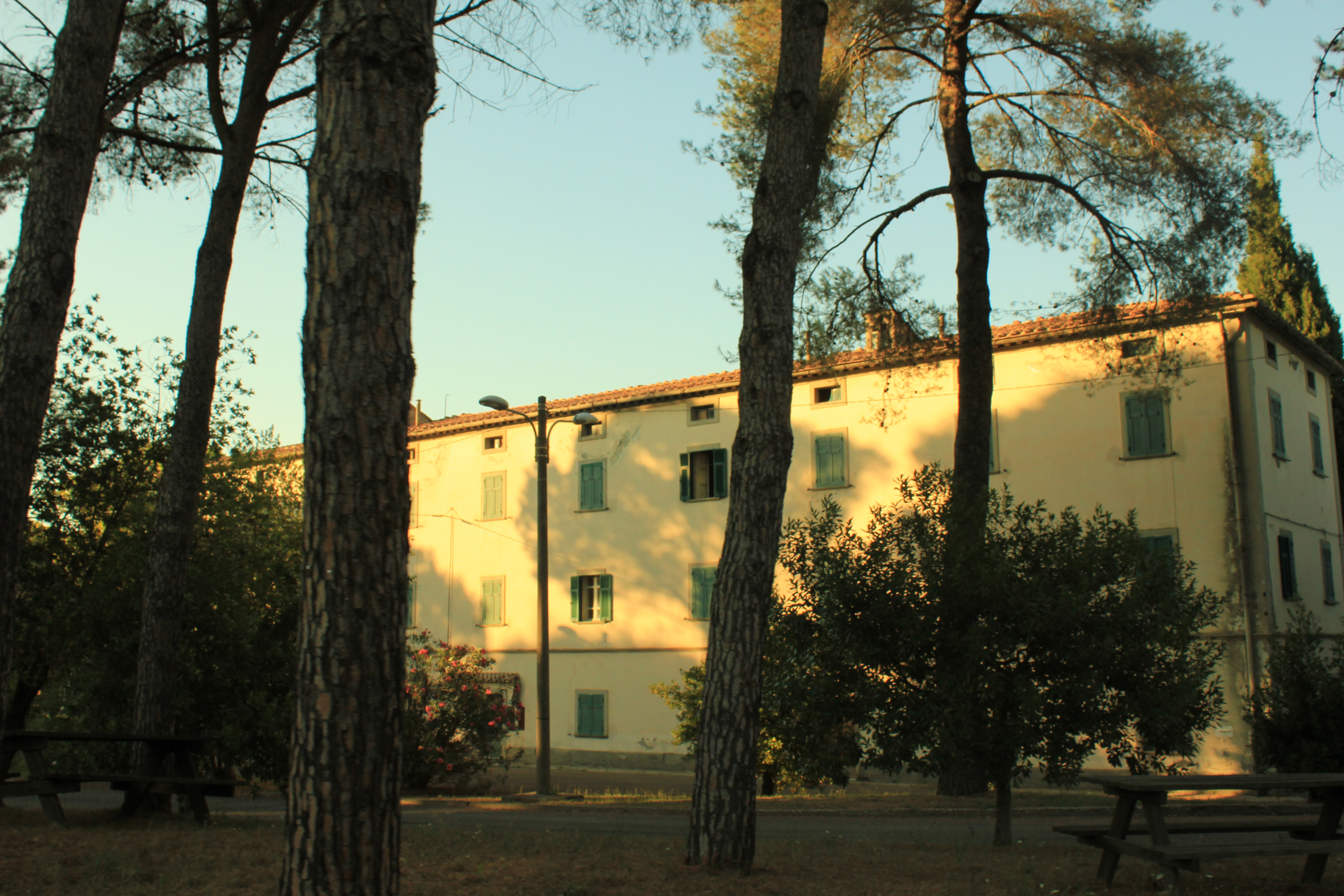
- The buildings of the workers' village next to the geothermal power plant

- Location of Lago Boracifero in Italy
- Coordinates: 43°9′4″N 10°48′43″E
- Country: Italy
- Region: Tuscany
- Province: Grosseto (GR)
- Comune: Monterotondo Marittimo
- Elevation: 208 m (682 ft)

Population (2011)
  - Total: 35
- Time zone: UTC+1 (CET)
  - Summer (DST): UTC+2 (CEST)
- Postal code: 58025
- Dialing code: (+39) 0564

Lago Boracifero is a village in Tuscany, central Italy, administratively a frazione of the comune of Monterotondo Marittimo, province of Grosseto, in the area of Colline Metallifere. At the time of the 2001 census, its population was 51.

Lago Boracifero is about 72 km from Grosseto and 7 km from Monterotondo Marittimo, and it lies on the lake of the same name, known for its geysers.

== Main sights ==
- The geothermal power plant, with its wells, pipes for steam, and the buildings of the workers' village, dating back to the early 20th century. Their task was to transform geothermal energy produced by the lake into electricity.
- Church of Madonna di Montenero, situated in the hamlet of Fattoria del Lago, it was built in 1853.
- Biancane Natural Park, a protected natural area where there is the presence of different types of geothermal manifestations such as geysers, fumaroles and steam emissions from the soil.

== See also ==
- Boracifero Lake
- Frassine
- Monterotondo Marittimo

== Bibliography ==
- Aldo Mazzolai, Guida della Maremma. Percorsi tra arte e natura, Le Lettere, Florence, 1997.
