= Leonardo Agostini =

Italian antiquary (1593–1676)

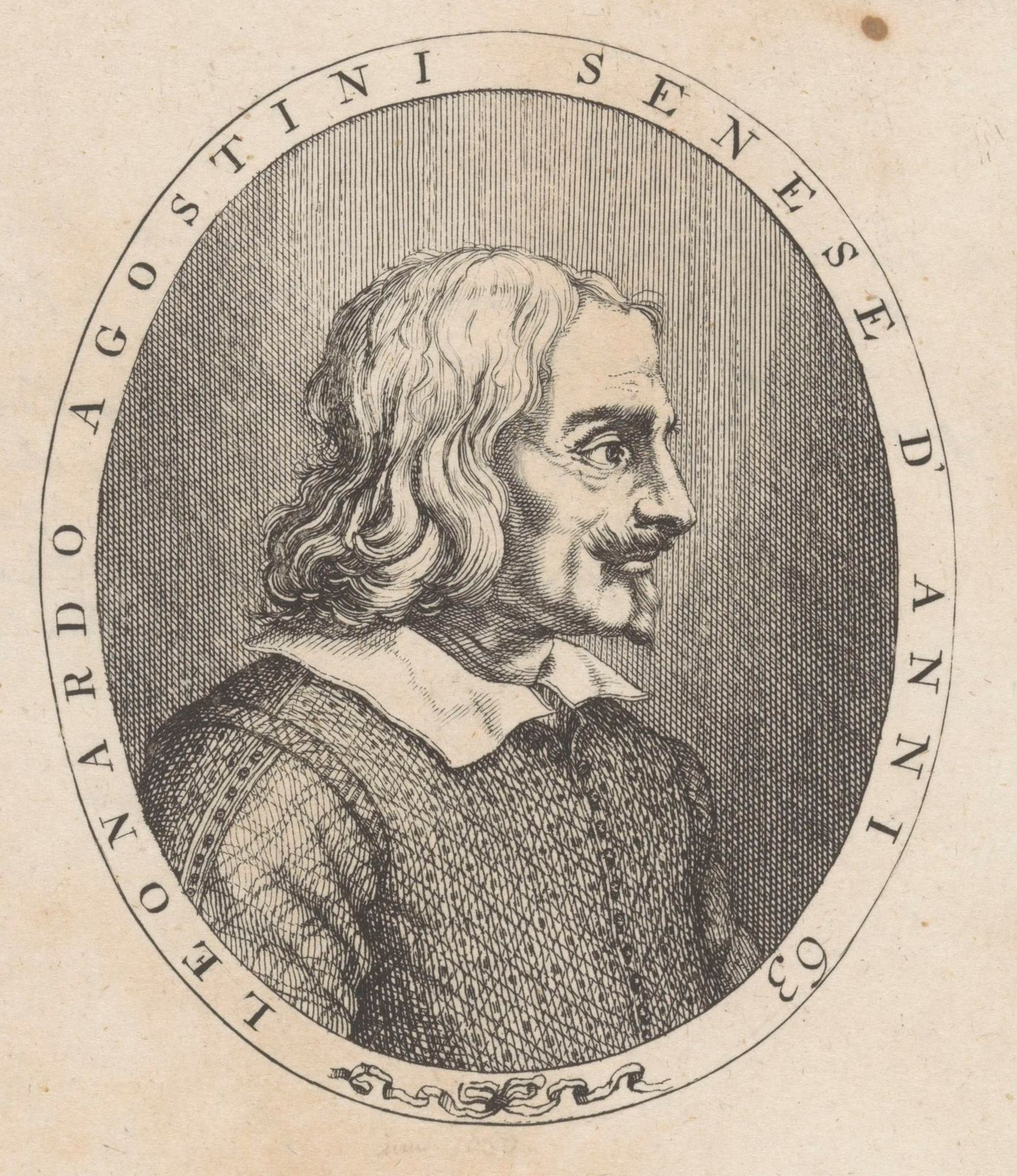
- Portrait of Leonardo Agostini. Rijksmuseum
- Born: 18 September 1593; Boccheggiano, Grand Duchy of Tuscany
- Died: August 1676, c. 1670 (aged 82–83); Rome, Papal States
- Occupation: Antiquarian, numismatist, engraved gem researcher, historian, merchant

Leonardo Agostini (19 September 1593 – August 1676) was an Italian antiquary of the 17th century, born in Boccheggiano, near Grosseto.

== Life ==
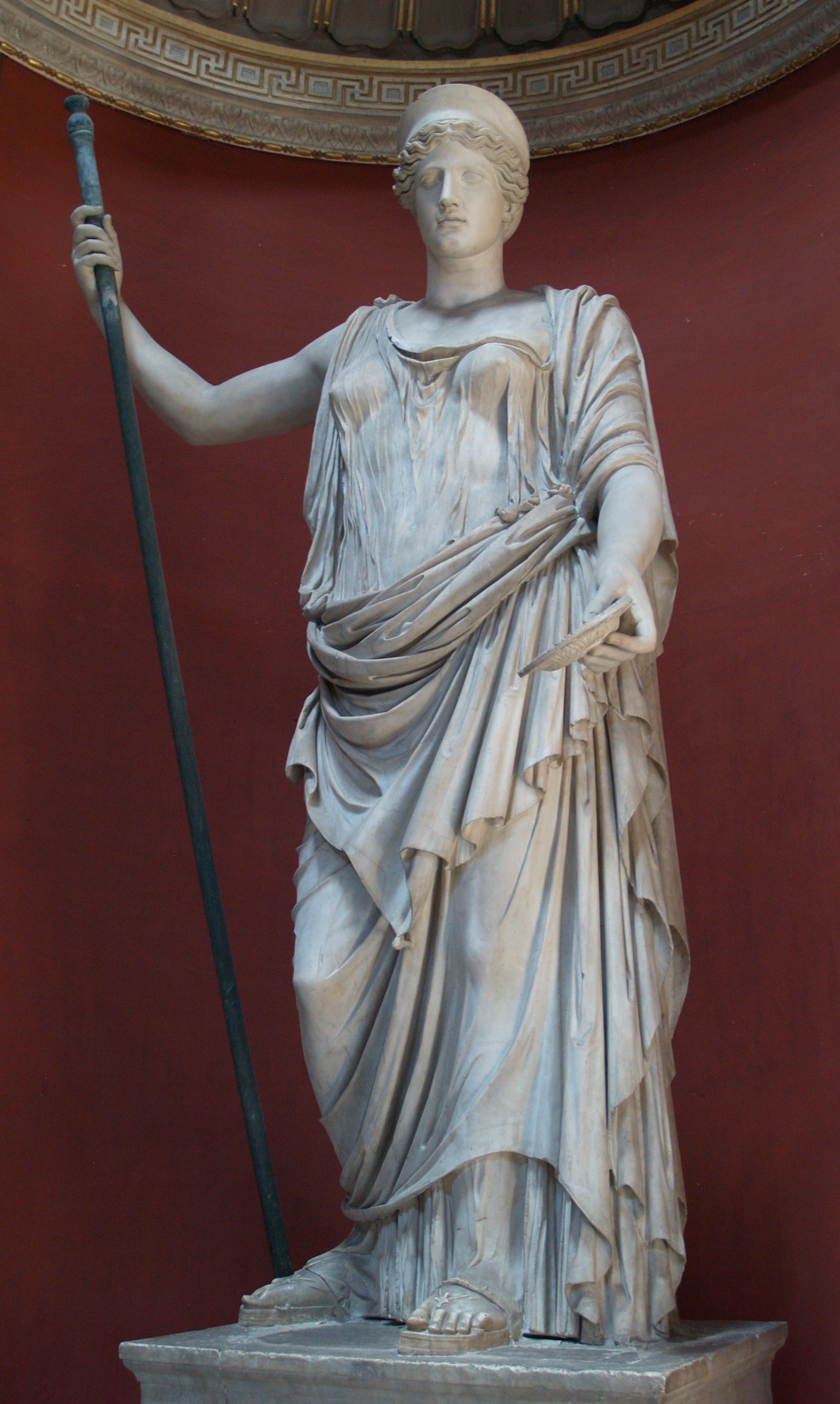
The "Barberini Hera" discovered by Agostini

Agostino was employed for some time as antiquario to Cardinal Francesco Barberini to collect works of art for the recently constructed Palazzo Barberini. His letters to the Barberini family during their period of disgrace and exile (1646–50) have provided art historians with information on the archaeological activity of the time. Appointed superintendent of antiquities in the Papal States by Pope Alexander VII, he directed excavations in Rome at the Forum and at the thermae near the church of San Lorenzo in Panisperna, where he discovered the "Barberini Hera".

Agostino was known for his work in numismatics and his later work studying carved gems. In 1649, he issued a new edition of Filippo Paruta's Sicilian Medals, with engravings of 400 additional specimens. In conjunction with Gian Pietro Bellori (1615–1696) he published Gemme antiche figurate, a work on antique engraved gems, in two volumes (Rome, 1657 and 1669); the first was devoted entirely to Cardinal Francesco's collection, which Agostini had assembled for the papal nephew, and the second to cameos and other discoveries from the auguste ruine della gran Roma (the "august ruins of great Rome"). The work, which grouped the gems according to the themes represented, was translated into Latin by Jakob Gronovius in Amsterdam, 1685.

Agostini was acquainted with all the Roman antiquarians of his day, including Bellori, Cassiano dal Pozzo and Andrea Sacchi; he preserved a volume of Annibale Carracci's ephemeral caricature sketches.

== Works ==
- Notizia generale delle medaglie più rare battute nella Grecia dette medaglie greche, da Pompeio Magno sino a Claudio II detto Gothico, seguita da una Serie degli Imperatori, Imperatrici e persone illustri antiche delle quali sono state battute le medaglie da Giulio Cesare sino ad Eraclio (Biblioteca Apostolica Vaticana, Vat. Lat. 8243, cc. 1-249);
- Il sacro Gieroglifico del nome di Christo col celeste titolo della vittoria di Costantino contro Massentio - Medaglia di Leonardo Agostini (Biblioteca Angelica, Roma, ms. 1628, cc. 182-186).
- Paruta, Filippo (1649). La Sicilia; descritta con medaglie e ristampata con aggiunta da Leonardo Agostini (in Italian). Rome: Nicola Schiratti.
- Agostini, Leonardo (1657). Le gemme antiche figurate (in Italian). Vol. 1. Rome: appresso dell'autore.
- Agostini, Leonardo (1669). Le gemme antiche figurate (in Italian). Vol. 2. Rome: appresso Michele Hercole.
- Agostini, Leonardo (1685). Gemmae et sculpturae antiquae (in Latin). Vol. 1. Translated by Jakob Gronovius (1 ed.). Amstelodami: Abraham Blooteling.
- Agostini, Leonardo (1685). Gemmae et sculpturae antiquae (in Latin). Vol. 2. Translated by Jakob Gronovius (1 ed.). Amstelodami: Abraham Blooteling.
