= Larderello =

Lardarello
- Frazione
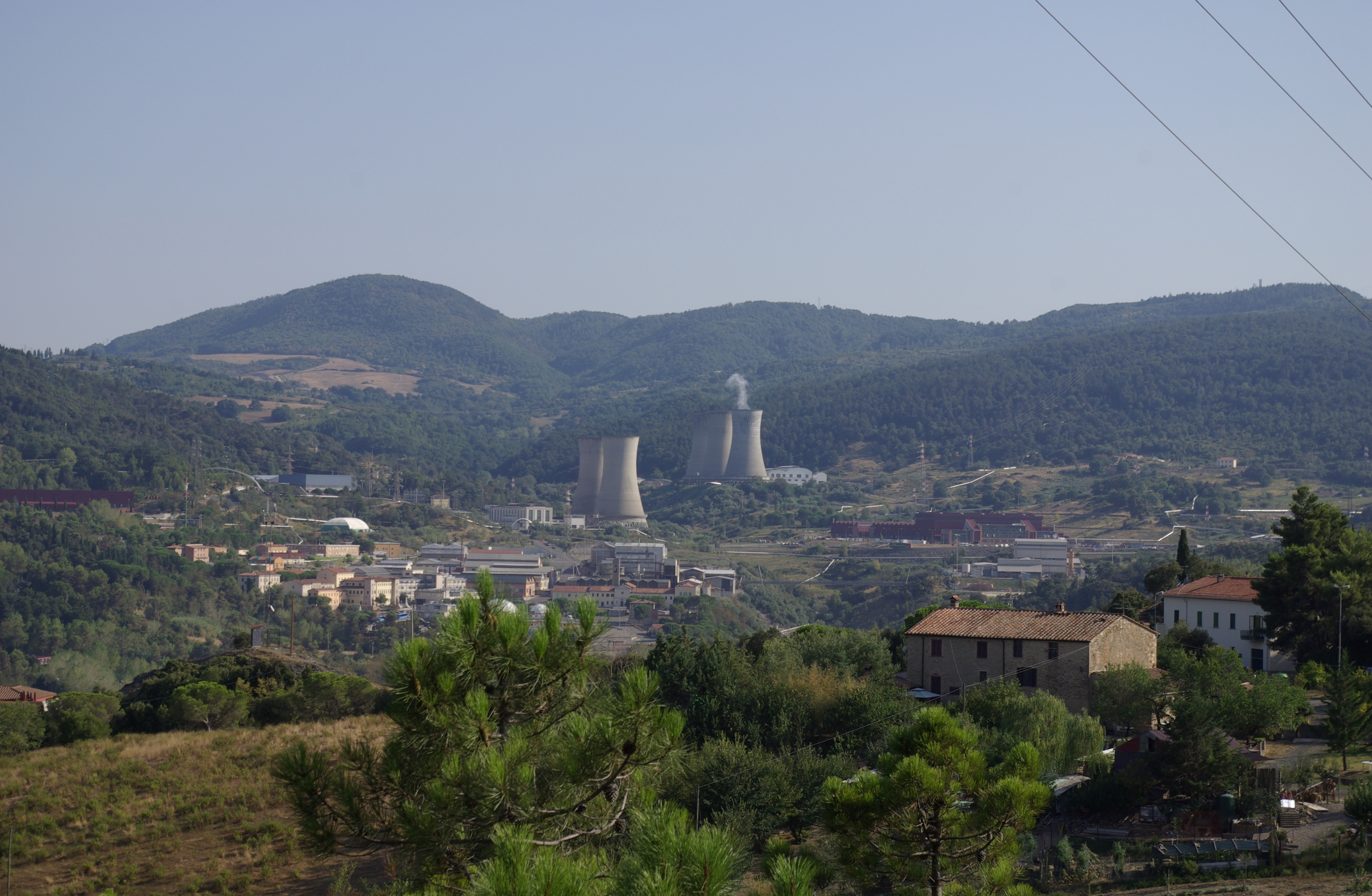

- Location of Lardarello in Italy
- Coordinates: 43°14′23″N 10°53′20″E
- Country: Italy
- Region: Tuscany
- Province: Pisa (PI)
- Comune: Pomarance
- Elevation: 390 m (1,280 ft)

Population (2011)
  - Total: 342
- Demonym: Larderellini
- Time zone: UTC+1 (CET)
  - Summer (DST): UTC+2 (CEST)
- Postal code: 56044
- Dialing code: (+39) 0588

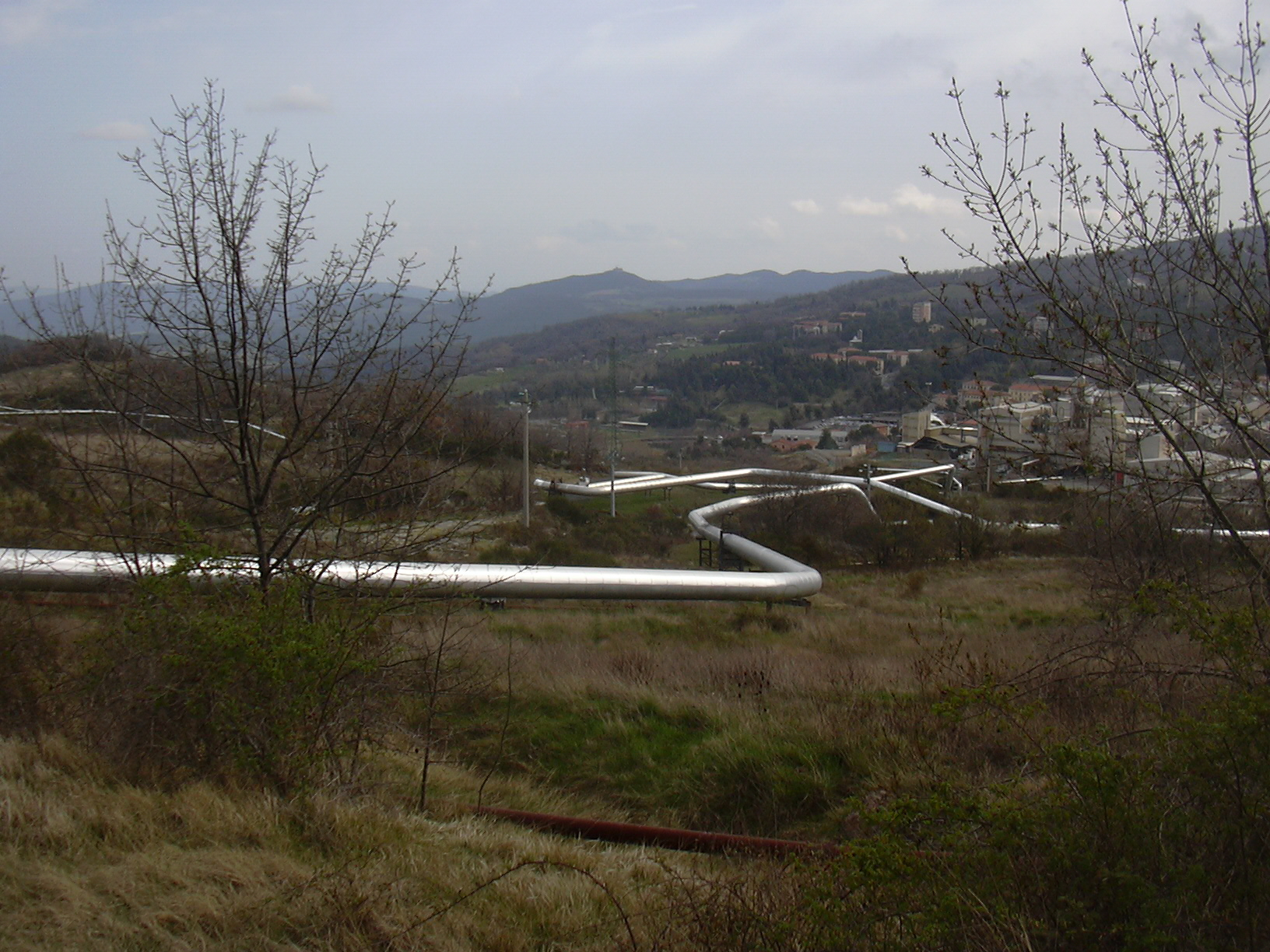
Pipework for geothermal power generation in Valle del Diavolo (Devil's Valley), Larderello.

Larderello is a frazione of the comune of Pomarance, in Tuscany in central Italy, renowned for its geothermal productivity.

== Geography ==
The region of Larderello has experienced occasional phreatic eruptions, caused by explosive outbursts of steam trapped below the surface. The water is contained in metamorphic rocks where it is turned to steam which is then trapped beneath a dome of impermeable shales and clay. The steam escapes through faults in the dome and forces its way out in the hot springs. It possesses a dozen explosion craters 30–250 m in diameter. The largest is the Lago Vecchienna crater which last erupted around 1282, now filled by the Boracifero Lake.

Larderello now produces 10% of the world's entire supply of geothermal electricity, amounting to 4,800 GWh per year and powering about a million Italian households. Its geology makes it uniquely conducive to geothermal power production, with hot granite rocks lying unusually close to the surface, producing steam as hot as 202 °C (396 °F).

Contrary to popular belief, Larderello is not a volcano as no eruptions of magma had occurred there at any point in history.

== History ==
The region was known from ancient times for its exceptionally hot springs. The Romans used its sulphur springs for bathing.

During the 19th century it became one of the first places in the world where geothermal energy was exploited to support industry. In 1827, François Jacques de Larderel, a Frenchman, invented a way of extracting boric acid from the mud by using steam to heat cauldrons to separate the two. Leopold II, Grand Duke of Tuscany was an enthusiastic supporter of Larderel's scheme and awarded him the title of Count of Montecerboli a decade later. A town, named Larderello in honour of Larderel's work, was founded to house the workers in the boric acid production factory.

The region was the site of a pioneering experiment in the production of energy from geothermal sources in 1904, when five light bulbs were lit by electricity produced through steam emerging from vents in the ground - the first ever practical demonstration of geothermal power.

Prince Piero Ginori Conti tested the first geothermal power generator on 4 July 1904, at the Larderello dry steam field in Italy. It was a small generator that lit four light bulbs. In 1911, the world's first geothermal power plant was built in the Valle del Diavolo ("Devil's Valley"), named for the boiling water that rises there. It was the world's only industrial producer of geothermal electricity until 1958, when New Zealand built a plant of its own in Wairakei. In recent years concerns have been expressed about the sustainability of its steam supply, as a 30% drop in steam pressure levels has been recorded from the maximum levels of the 1950s.
