= San Dalmazio, Pomarance =

San Dalmazio
- Frazione
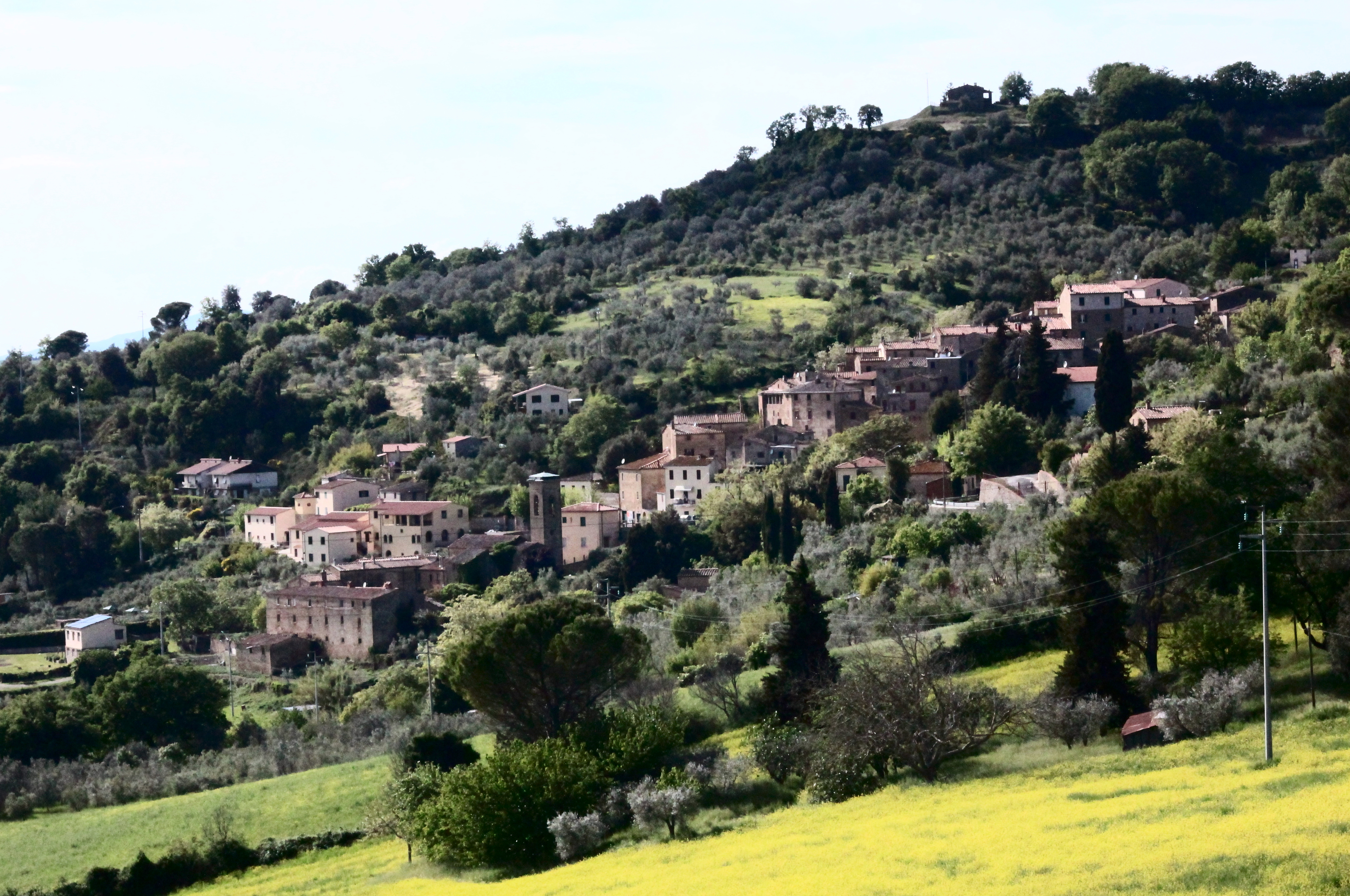
- San Dalmazio

- Location of San Dalmazio in Italy
- Coordinates: 43°15′43.8″N 10°55′34.2″E
- Country: Italy
- Region: Tuscany
- Province: Pisa (PI)
- Comune: Pomarance

Population (2011)
  - Total: 135
- Time zone: UTC+1 (CET)
  - Summer (DST): UTC+2 (CEST)
- Postal code: 56045
- Dialing code: 0588
- Website: https://www.comunepomarance.it/

San Dalmazio is a frazione of the comune of Pomarance, in Tuscany, Province of Pisa, in central Italy.

== History ==
San Dalmazio was built around a castle of the 19th century, but the name of the community is known from historical documents dating to around 1040, as a village dependent on the monastery of San Pietro in Palazzuolo. In 1147 a monastery of Benedictine nuns was founded on its territory; this was destroyed by fire in 1438. Pope Eugene IV granted indulgences to help the reconstruction of the monastery, but in 1511, the sisters moved to Volterra.

The village lost self-government in 1776 when it was absorbed by Pomarance.

== Monuments ==
- A church of the 16th century, attributed to Bartolomeo Ammannati.
- Two oratories, one of the Institute of Charity and the other of Saint Donnino. In this second there's a nail (called of San Donnino) considered miraculous for illnesses.
- Casa Serafini, on whose walls is a commemorating tablet noting that Giuseppe Garibaldi stayed there from 28 August to 1 September 1849.

== Interesting facts ==
Bram Vermeulen, a famous Dutch singer, died in San Dalmazio because of a heart failure on 4 September 2004.

== Bibliography ==
- Gino Moliterno, Encyclopedia of Contemporary Italian Culture, 2003, ISBN 0415285569
- Marco Armiero, Marcus Hall, Nature and History in Modern Italy (Ecology & History) (1st izd.), Ohio University Press, 2010, ISBN 0821419161
- Francesco Guicciardini, The History of Italy, Princeton University Press, 1984, ISBN 0691008000
- Roy P. Domenico, The Regions of Italy: A Reference Guide to History and Culture, Greenwood, 2001, ISBN 0313307334
- Catherine B. Avery, The New Century Italian Renaissance Encyclopedia (Simon & Schuster izd.), 1972, ISBN 0136120512
- Frank J. Coppa, Dictionary of Modern Italian History, Greenwood, 1985, ISBN 031322983X
