= Santi Michele e Paolo, Montieri =

Church building in Montieri, Italy

Santi Michele e Paolo is a medieval Roman Catholic church in the small town of Montieri, region of Tuscany, Italy.

== History and description ==
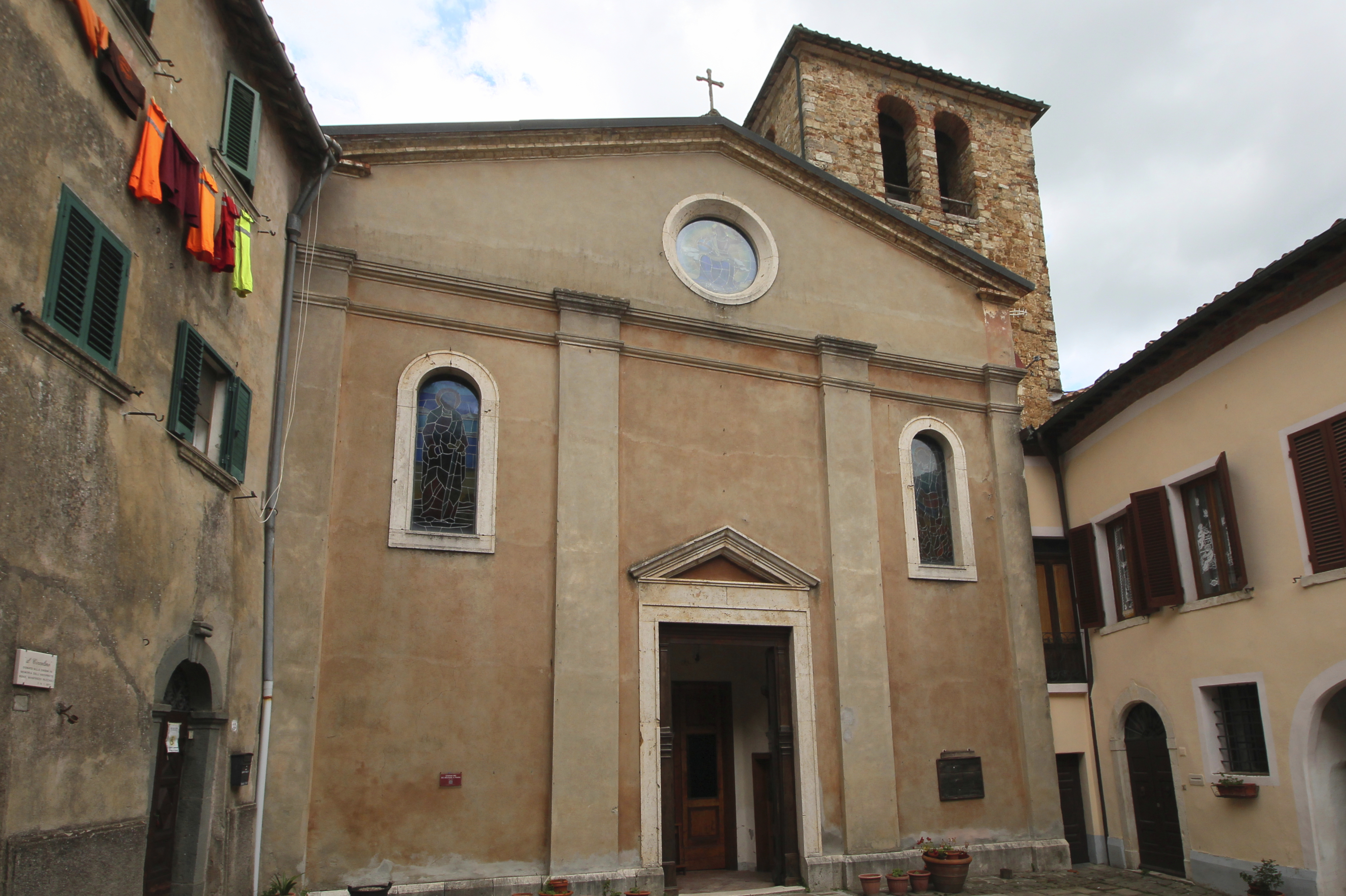
The church Santi Michele e Paolo

A church at the site, dedicated to Saints Michael and Paul, is documented from the 13th century. The Archangel Michael, patron saint of high and inaccessible places, was patron of the town since 1540. Built inside the medieval walls, the present church was built in the 14th century. The church houses an organ from 1604, a 16th-century altarpiece depicting St Sebastian, and a small canvas depicting the Madonna della Cintola, (Madonna of the Girdle), attributed to Taddeo Gaddi. The urn above the main altar contains the relics of the Blessed Giacomo Papocchi. The reliquary bust dates to 1670.
