= Serrazzano =

- Frazione
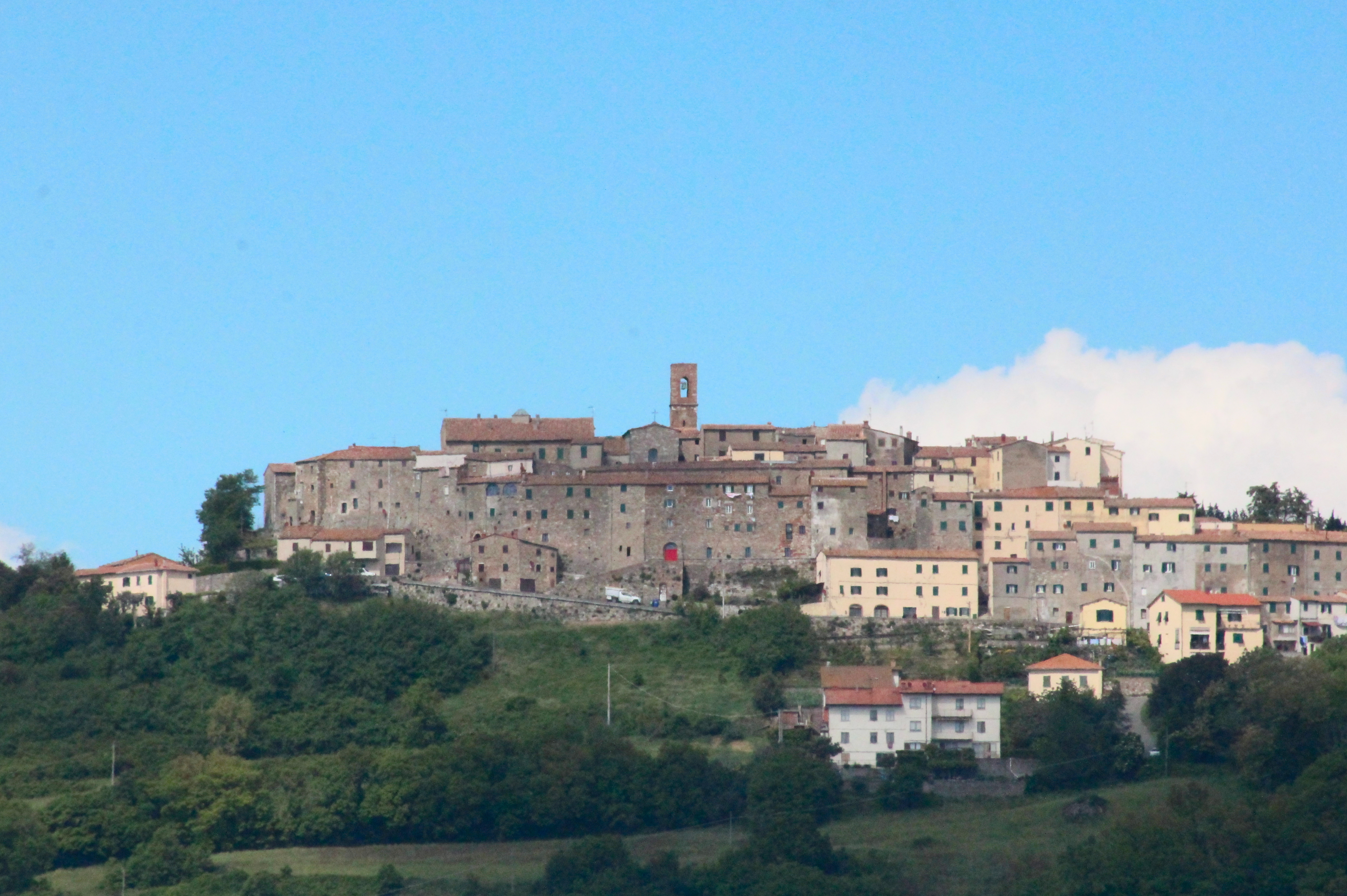

- Location of Serrazzano in Italy
- Coordinates: 43°13′6″N 10°48′47″E
- Country: Italy
- Region: Tuscany
- Province: Pisa (PI)
- Comune: Pomarance
- Elevation: 548 m (1,798 ft)

Population (2011)
  - Total: 395
- Demonym: Serrazzanini
- Time zone: UTC+1 (CET)
  - Summer (DST): UTC+2 (CEST)
- Postal code: 56044
- Dialing code: (+39) 0588

Serrazzano is a village in Tuscany, central Italy, administratively a frazione of the comune of Pomarance, province of Pisa. At the time of the 2001 census its population was 389. Serrazzano is about 95 km from Pisa and 20 km from Pomarance. The Castle of Serrazzano is a 19th-century Neo-Gothic structure in the village.
