= Lustignano =

- Frazione
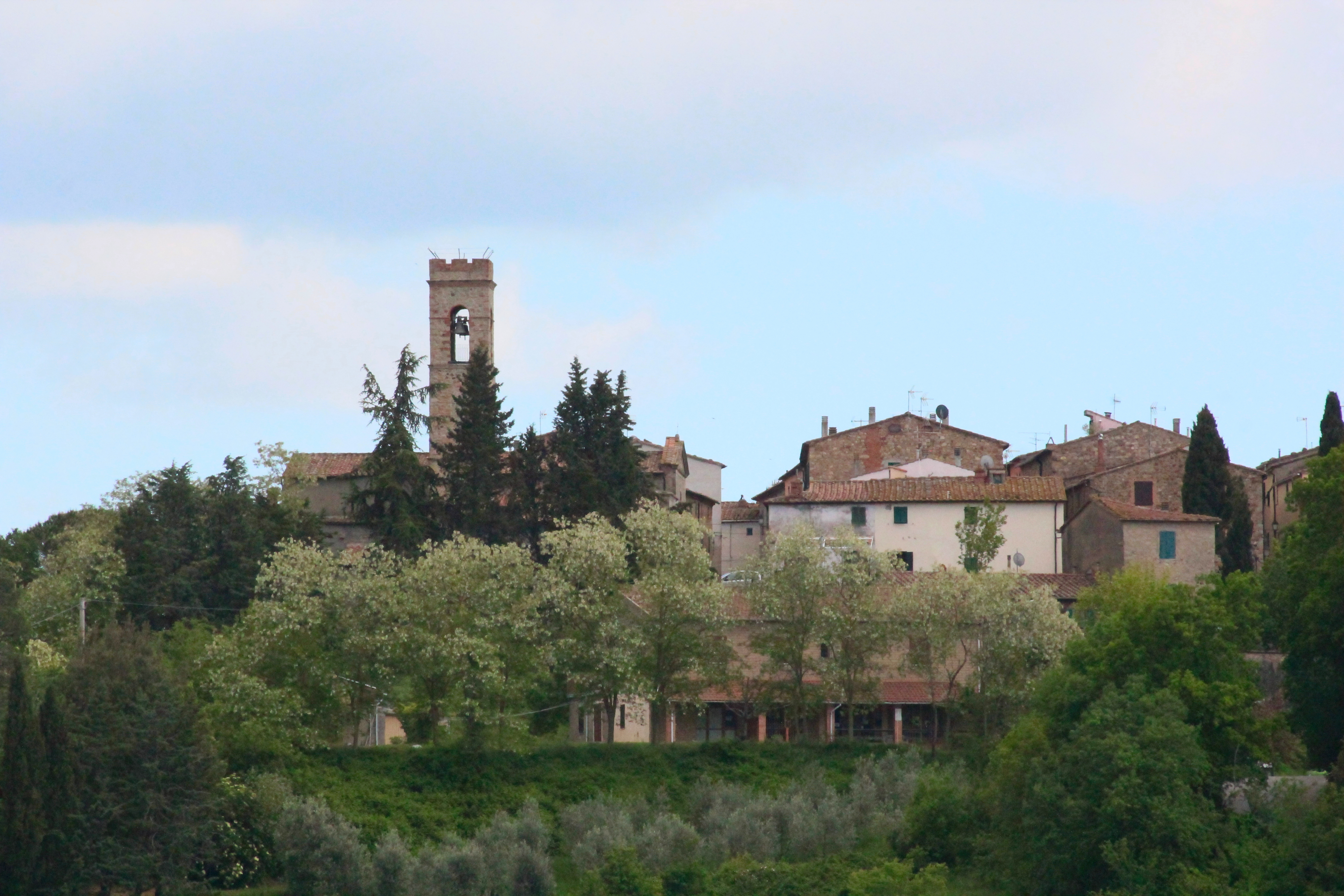

- Location of Lustignano in Italy
- Coordinates: 43°11′8″N 10°48′9″E
- Country: Italy
- Region: Tuscany
- Province: Pisa (PI)
- Comune: Pomarance
- Elevation: 410 m (1,350 ft)

Population (2001)
  - Total: 156
- Demonym: Lustignanini
- Time zone: UTC+1 (CET)
  - Summer (DST): UTC+2 (CEST)
- Postal code: 56044
- Dialing code: (+39) 0588

Lustignano is a village in Tuscany, central Italy, administratively a frazione of the comune of Pomarance, province of Pisa. At the time of the 2001 census its population was 156.
