= Micciano =

- Frazione
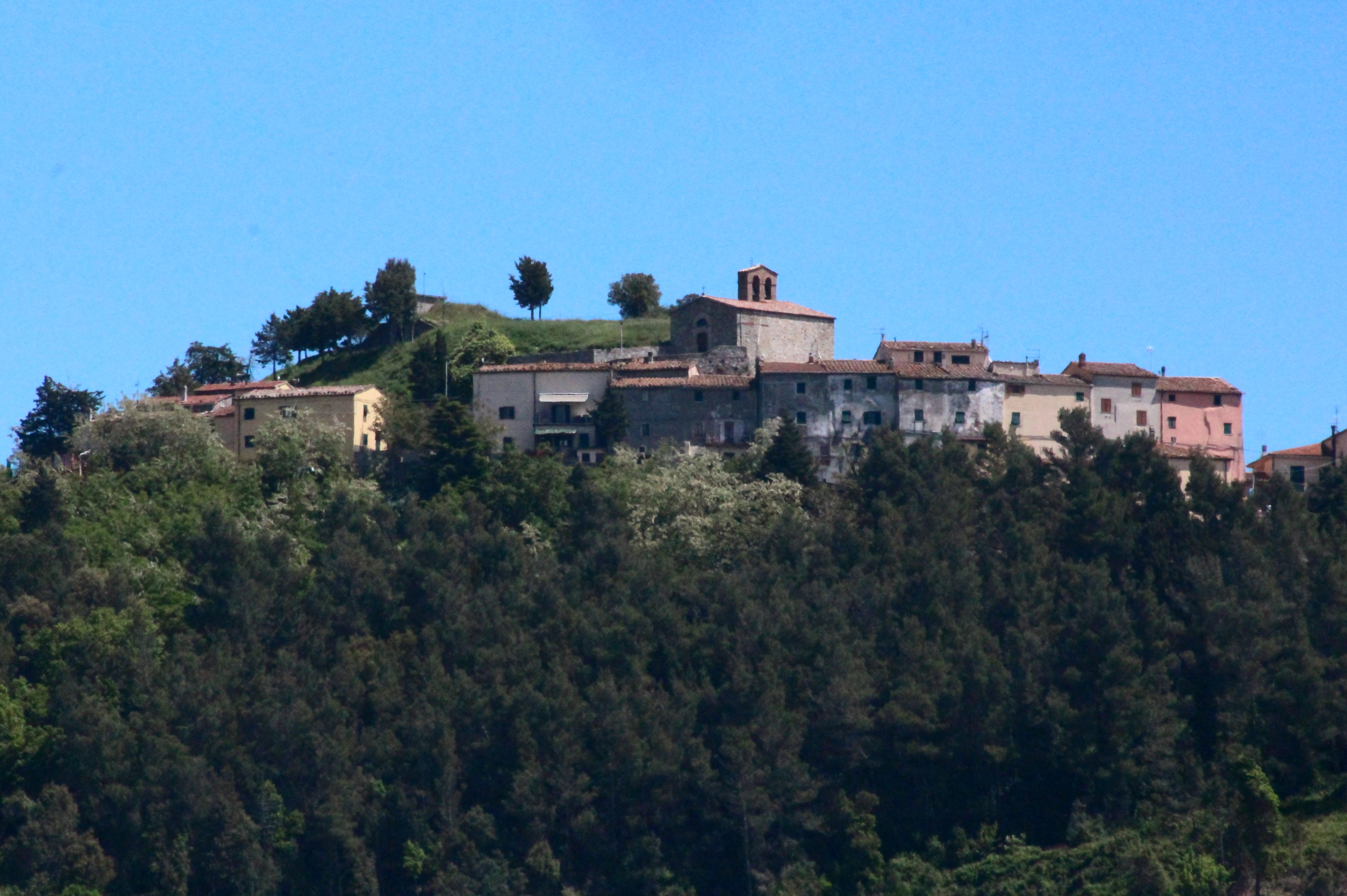

- Location of Micciano in Italy
- Coordinates: 43°17′13″N 10°47′3″E
- Country: Italy
- Region: Tuscany
- Province: Pisa (PI)
- Comune: Pomarance
- Elevation: 473 m (1,552 ft)

Population (2011)
  - Total: 60
- Demonym: Miccianesi
- Time zone: UTC+1 (CET)
  - Summer (DST): UTC+2 (CEST)
- Postal code: 56045
- Dialing code: (+39) 0588

Micciano is a village in Tuscany, central Italy, administratively a frazione of the comune of Pomarance, province of Pisa. At the time of the 2001 census its population was 65.

Micciano is about 80 km from Pisa and 13 km from Pomarance.
