= Ferdinando Pierazzi =

Italian politician (1898–1937)

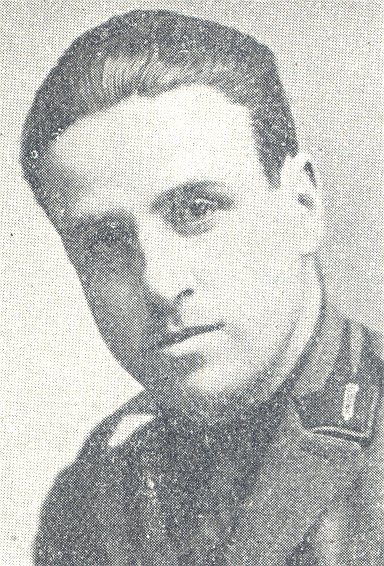

Federal secretary of Grosseto
- In office September 1921 – December 1921
- Preceded by: Office established
- Succeeded by: Dino Castellani
- In office March 1923 – 18 May 1924
- Preceded by: Dino Andriani
- Succeeded by: Generoso Pucci
- In office 7 February 1925 – 10 April 1929
- Preceded by: Generoso Pucci
- Succeeded by: Biagio Vecchioni

Member of the Chamber of Deputies
- In office 1924–1937

Undersecretary of State of the Ministry of Communications
- In office 12 September 1929 – 20 July 1932
- President: Benito Mussolini
- Minister: Costanzo Ciano

Personal details
- Born: 24 July 1898 Grosseto, Kingdom of Italy
- Died: 13 August 1937 (aged 39) Bologna, Kingdom of Italy
- Party: National Fascist Party
- Occupation: Lawyer

Ferdinando Pierazzi (24 July 1898 – 13 August 1937) was an Italian fascist politician, who served as federal secretary of Grosseto, member of the Chamber of Deputies and Undersecretary of the Ministry of Communications.

== Life and career ==
Born in 1898 in Grosseto, Pierazzi graduated in law and began his career as a lawyer. Coming from a prominent landowning family from Civitella Marittima, he became an early leader of local fascist squads and joined the National Fascist Party in 1920, participating in the March on Rome. He served as president of the Civitella fascist section and was appointed the first federal secretary of Grosseto in September 1921, at the age of 23. He held the office intermittently during 1923–1924 and again from 1925 until April 1929.

In the late 1920s, Pierazzi held numerous roles, including commander of the 98th MVSN Legion in Grosseto, member of the Provincial Council, and commissioner for the fascist federations of L'Aquila (1926), Trento, and Rovigo (1929). He was elected to the Italian Chamber of Deputies for three legislatures (XXVII–XXIX) and served as Undersecretary of State of Communications in Mussolini's government from September 1929 to July 1932.

Despite his national offices, Pierazzi retained significant influence in Grosseto, founding the fascist weekly La Maremma in 1923 and controlling local political appointments, including several podestà across the Maremma. He also promoted cultural and sporting initiatives.

Pierazzi died in a railway accident in 1937 at the age of 39.

== Sources ==
- Campagna, Stefano; Turbanti, Adolfo, eds. (2022). Antifascismo, guerra e resistenze in Maremma. Arcidosso: Effigi.
- Capitini Maccabruni, Nicla (1985). La Maremma contro il nazifascismo. Grosseto: La Commerciale.
- Galimi, Valeria, ed. (2018). Il fascismo a Grosseto. Figure e articolazioni del potere in provincia (1922-1938). Arcidosso: Effigi.
