= Montegemoli =

- Frazione
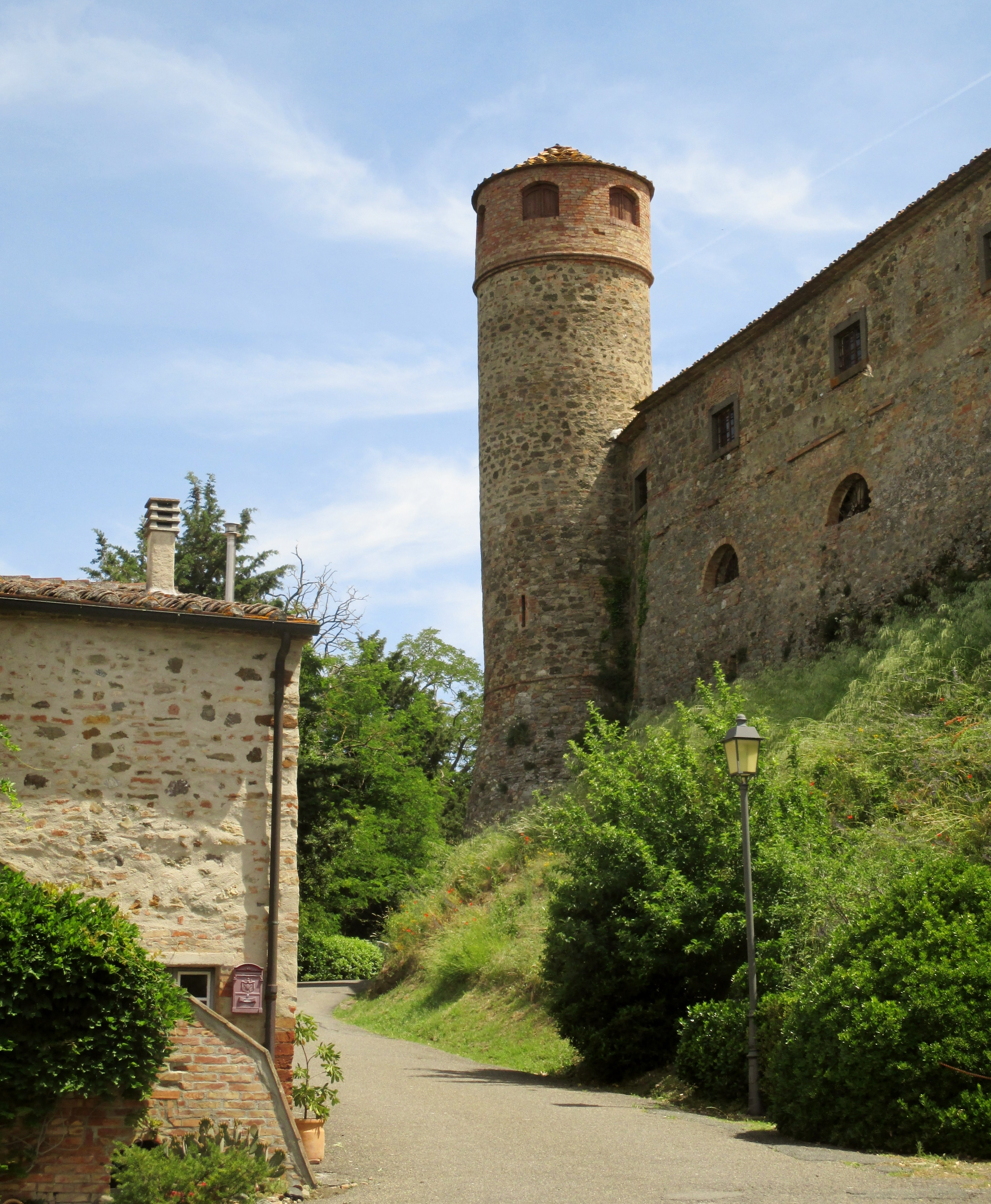
- The tower of the castle of Montegemoli

- Location of Montegemoli in Italy
- Coordinates: 43°19′58″N 10°47′31″E
- Country: Italy
- Region: Tuscany
- Province: Pisa (PI)
- Comune: Pomarance
- Elevation: 212 m (696 ft)

Population (2001)
  - Total: 39
- Demonym: Montegemolini
- Time zone: UTC+1 (CET)
  - Summer (DST): UTC+2 (CEST)
- Postal code: 56044
- Dialing code: (+39) 0588

Montegemoli is a village in Tuscany, central Italy, administratively a frazione of the comune of Pomarance, province of Pisa. At the time of the 2001 census its population was 39.
