= Libbiano, Pomarance =

Libbiano
- Frazione
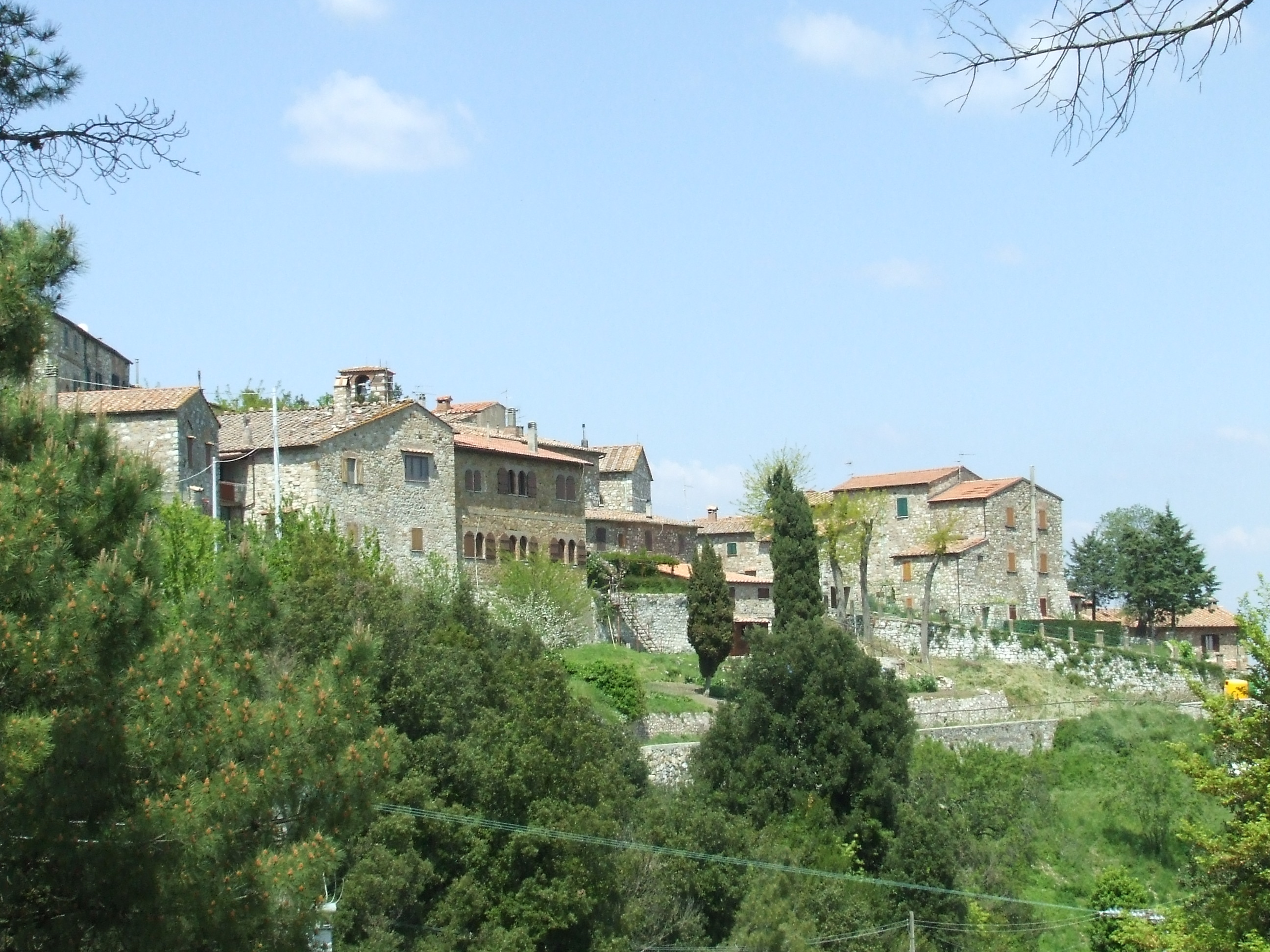

- Location of Libbiano in Italy
- Coordinates: 43°16′54″N 10°48′30″E
- Country: Italy
- Region: Tuscany
- Province: Pisa (PI)
- Comune: Pomarance
- Elevation: 479 m (1,572 ft)

Population (2001)
  - Total: 27
- Time zone: UTC+1 (CET)
  - Summer (DST): UTC+2 (CEST)
- Postal code: 56045
- Dialing code: (+39) 0588

Libbiano is a village in Tuscany, central Italy, administratively a frazione of the comune of Pomarance, province of Pisa. At the time of the 2001 census its population was 27.
