= Pomarancio =

Three Italian artists went by the name of Pomarancio or Il Pomarancio (indicating a native of Pomarance):

- Antonio Circignani (1570–1630)
- Niccolò Circignani (1520–1597)
- Cristoforo Roncalli (c. 1552–1626)
