= Cornate di Gerfalco =

Mountain in Italy

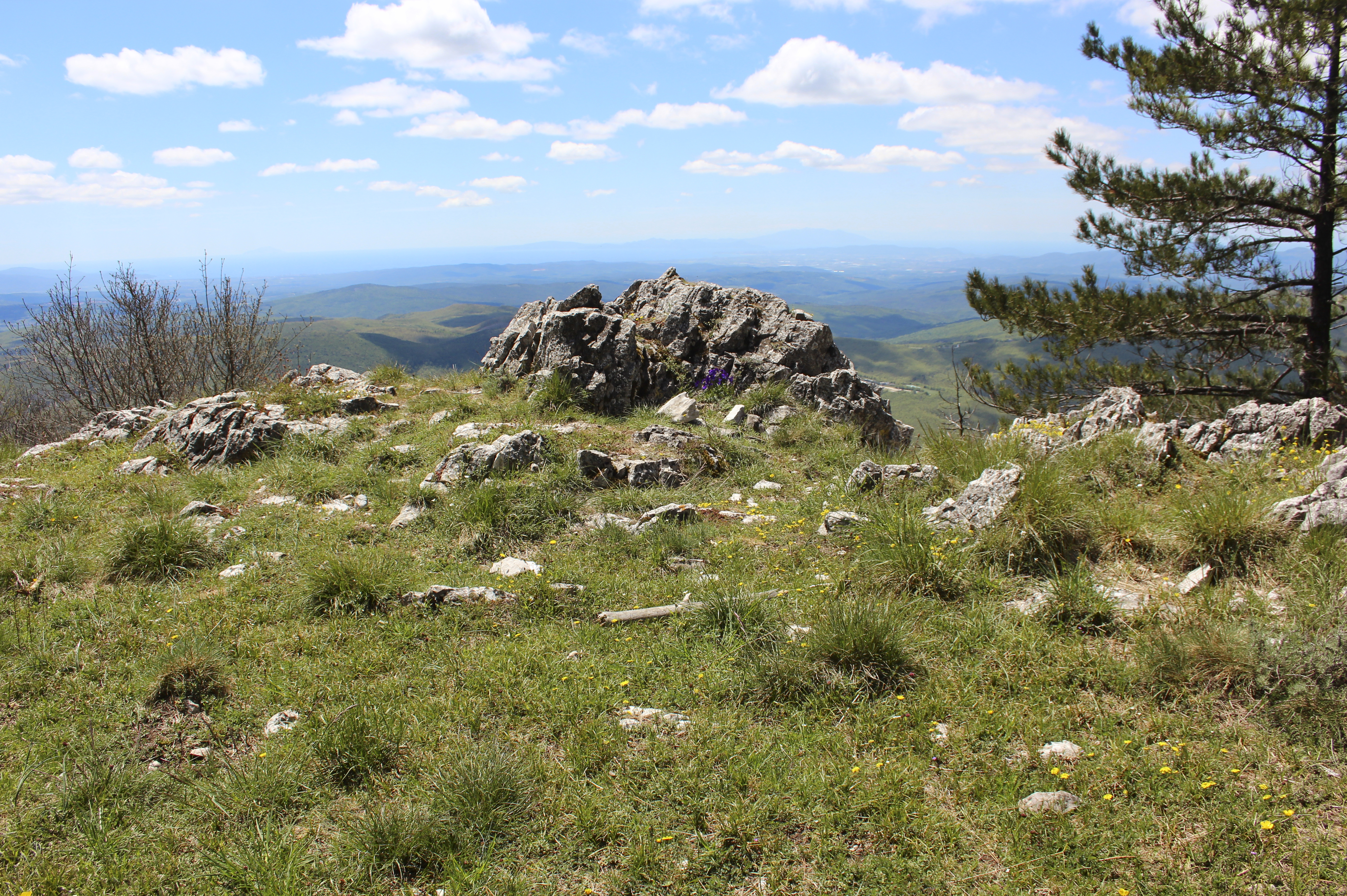
- Mountain top

Highest point
- Elevation: 1,059 m (3,474 ft)
- Coordinates: 43°09′33″N 10°57′13″E

Geography
- Location: Gerfalco, Montieri, Tuscany, Italy
- Parent range: Colline Metallifere

Cornate di Gerfalco is a 1,059 m (3,474 ft) tall mountain and the highest peak of the Colline Metallifere in Tuscany, Italy. It is located near the village of Gerfalco, from which it takes its name, in the municipality of Montieri.

== Description ==
Cornate di Gerfalco forms an elongated, isolated limestone ridge between the upper Cecina Valley and the valley of the Pavone stream. The crest extends for slightly more than 3 km (1.9 mi) in a north-west to south-east direction.

Thanks to its prominence over the surrounding hills, the summit offers panoramic views of southern Tuscany, the Maremma coast and the Tuscan Archipelago.

The north-eastern slope is covered by dense deciduous woodland, predominantly composed of chestnut trees. The south-western slope, by contrast, is drier and more exposed to sunlight, with less dense, predominantly shrubby vegetation.

== Nature protection ==
The mountain lies within the Special Area of Conservation (SAC) Cornate e Fosini (code IT51A0001).
