= Gerfalco =

- Frazione
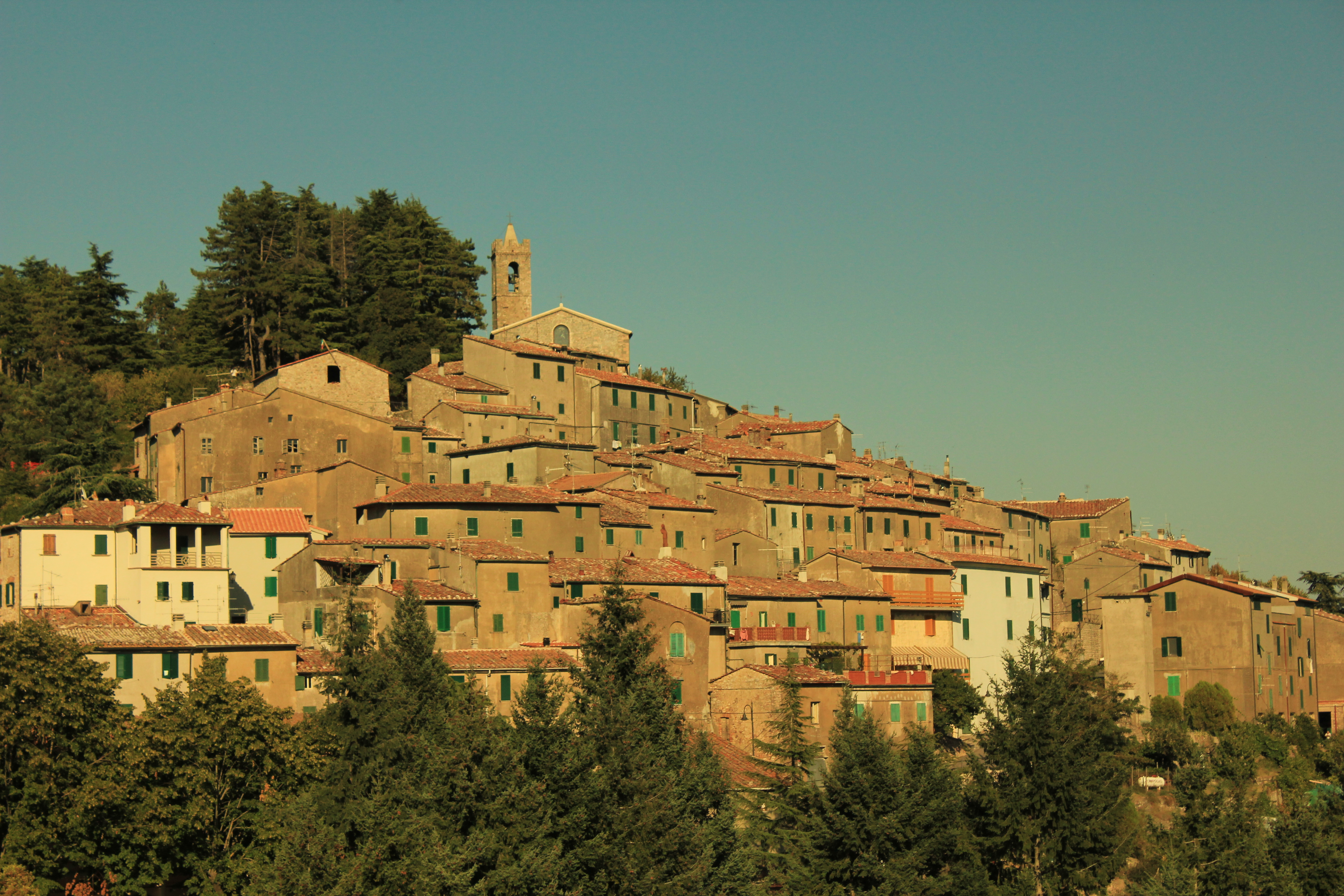
- View of Gerfalco

- Location of Gerfalco in Italy
- Coordinates: 43°8′47″N 10°58′46″E
- Country: Italy
- Region: Tuscany
- Province: Grosseto (GR)
- Comune: Montieri
- Elevation: 774 m (2,539 ft)

Population (2011)
  - Total: 110
- Demonym: Gerfalchini
- Time zone: UTC+1 (CET)
  - Summer (DST): UTC+2 (CEST)
- Postal code: 58020
- Dialing code: (+39) 0564

Gerfalco is a village in Tuscany, central Italy, administratively a frazione of the comune of Montieri, province of Grosseto, in the area of Colline Metallifere. At the time of the 2001 census its population amounted to 78.

== Geography ==
Gerfalco is about 70 km from Grosseto and 7 km from Montieri, and it is located near the Cornate di Gerfalco peak, in the Cornate e Fosini Natural Reserve.

== Main sights ==
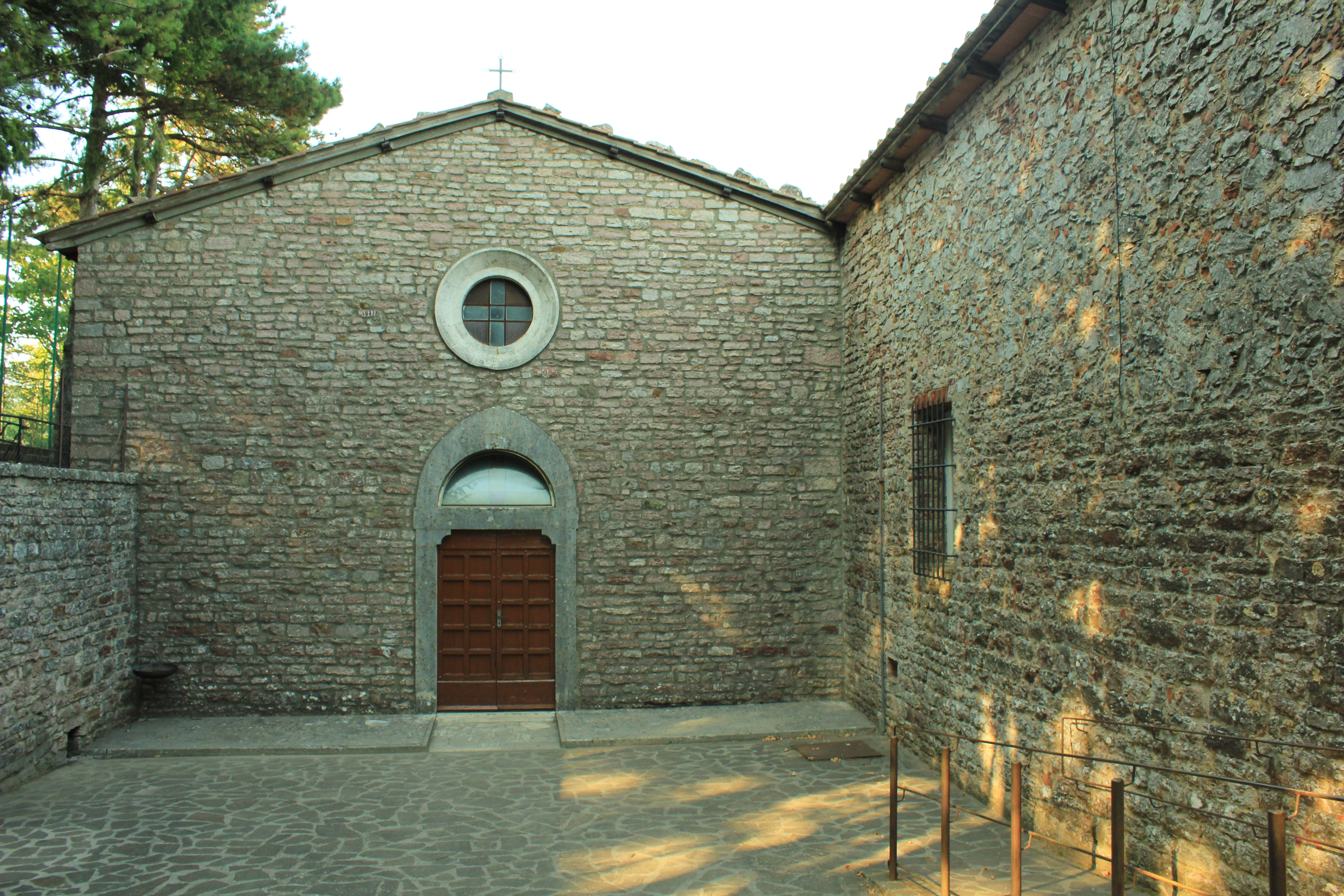
The church of Sant'Agostino

- San Biagio, main parish church of the village, it was consecrated in 1599.
- Sant'Agostino (14th century), it was an ancient convent of the Augustinians.
- Church of Misericordia (13th century), it was restructured in the 18th century.
- Walls of Gerfalco, old fortifications which surround the village since the 12th century.

== Bibliography ==
- Aldo Mazzolai, Guida della Maremma. Percorsi tra arte e natura, Le Lettere, Florence, 1997.

== See also ==
- Boccheggiano
- Montieri
- Travale
