= Pomarance =

- Comune
- Comune di Pomarance
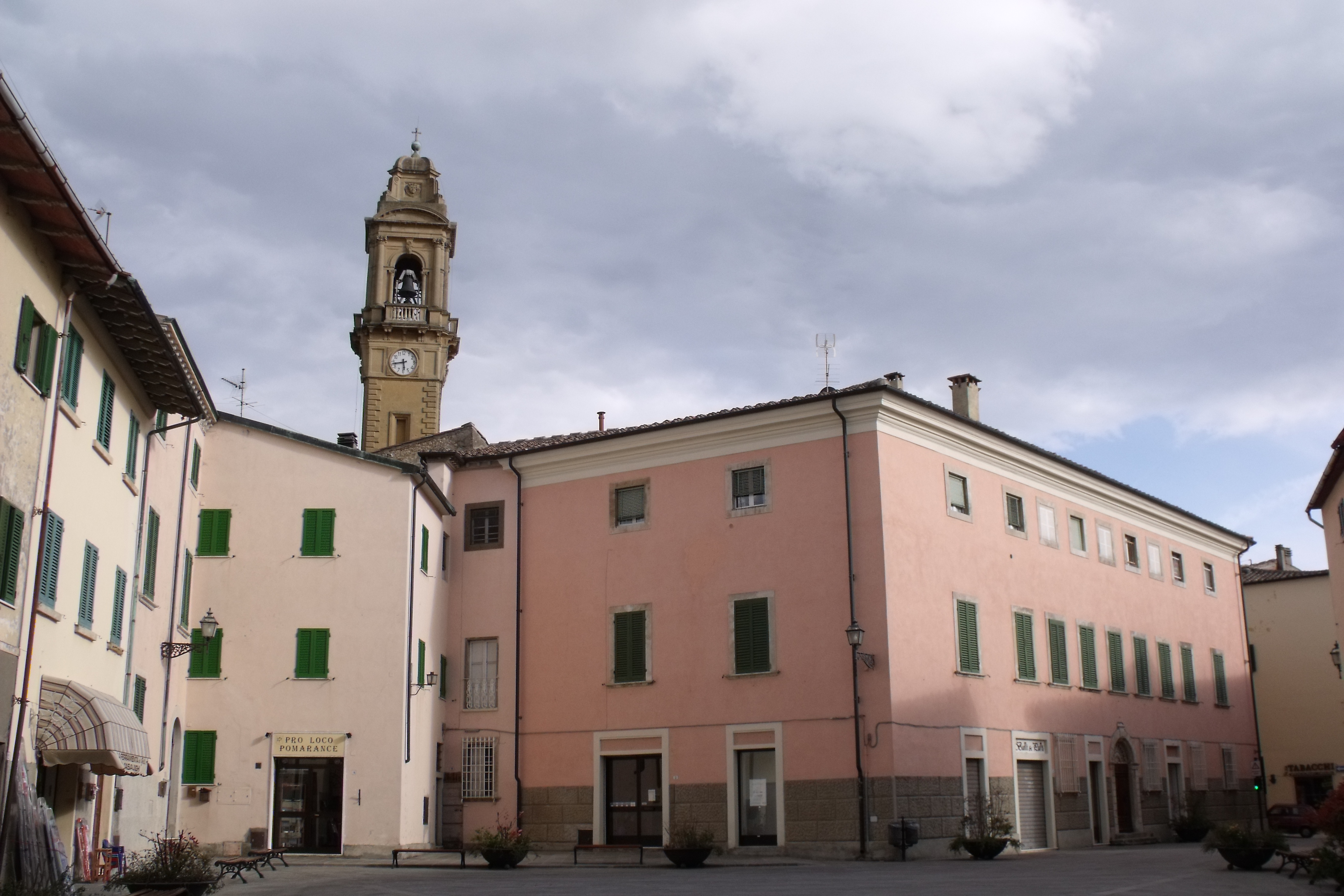
- Larderel principal Square

- Coat of arms

- Location within Italy Location within Tuscany
- Coordinates: 43°17′N 10°52′E
- Country: Italy
- Region: Tuscany
- Province: Pisa (PI)
- Frazioni: Larderello, Libbiano, Lustignano, Micciano, Montecerboli, Montegemoli, San Dalmazio, Serrazzano

Government
  - Mayor: Ilaria Bacci

Area
  - Total: 227.71 km^{2} (87.92 sq mi)
- Elevation: 370 m (1,210 ft)

Population (31 December 2016)
  - Total: 5,855
  - Density: 25.71/km^{2} (66.60/sq mi)
- Demonym: Pomarancini
- Time zone: UTC+1 (CET)
  - Summer (DST): UTC+2 (CEST)
- Postal code: 56045
- Dialing code: 0588
- Patron saint: San Vittore
- Website: Official website

Pomarance is a comune in the Province of Pisa in the Italian region Tuscany, located about 60 kilometres (37 mi) southwest of Florence and about 60 kilometres (37 mi) southeast of Pisa.

Pomarance borders the following municipalities: Casole d'Elsa, Castelnuovo di Val di Cecina, Montecatini Val di Cecina, Monterotondo Marittimo, Monteverdi Marittimo, Radicondoli, Volterra.

Pomarance was the hometown of three painters called Pomarancio after it.

From 1968 to 1992 there was at San Dalmazio the static inverter plant of HVDC Italy–Corsica–Sardinia. Today, there is a solar park.

Among the sights in the town are:

- Casa Bicocchi: palace of a local aristocratic family, acquired by the comune and now serving as a civic museum. The interior and frescoed rooms decorated mainly from the 19th-century.

== See also ==
- San Dalmazio, Pomarance
