= Boracifero Lake =

Lake in Tuscany, Italy

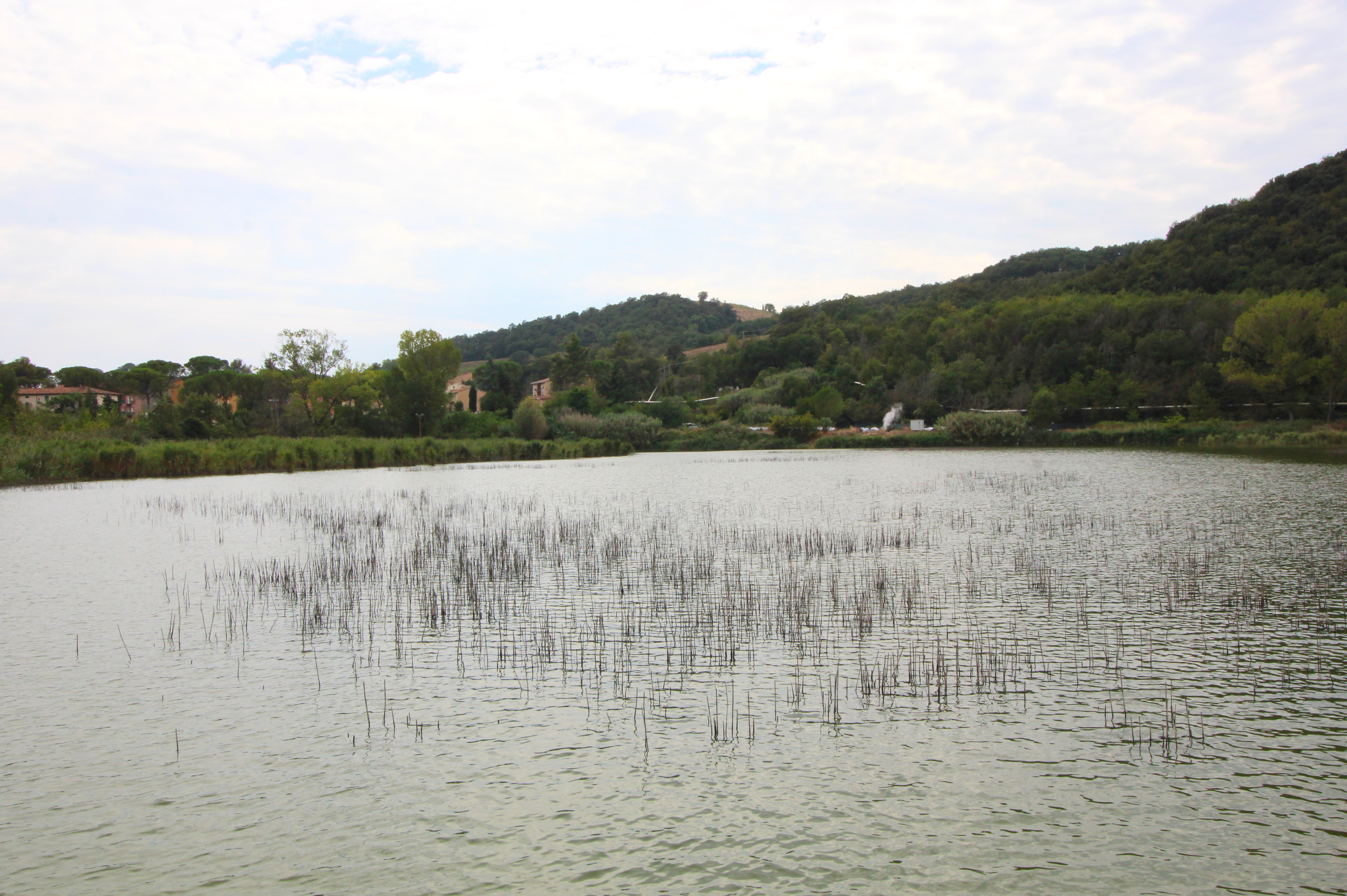

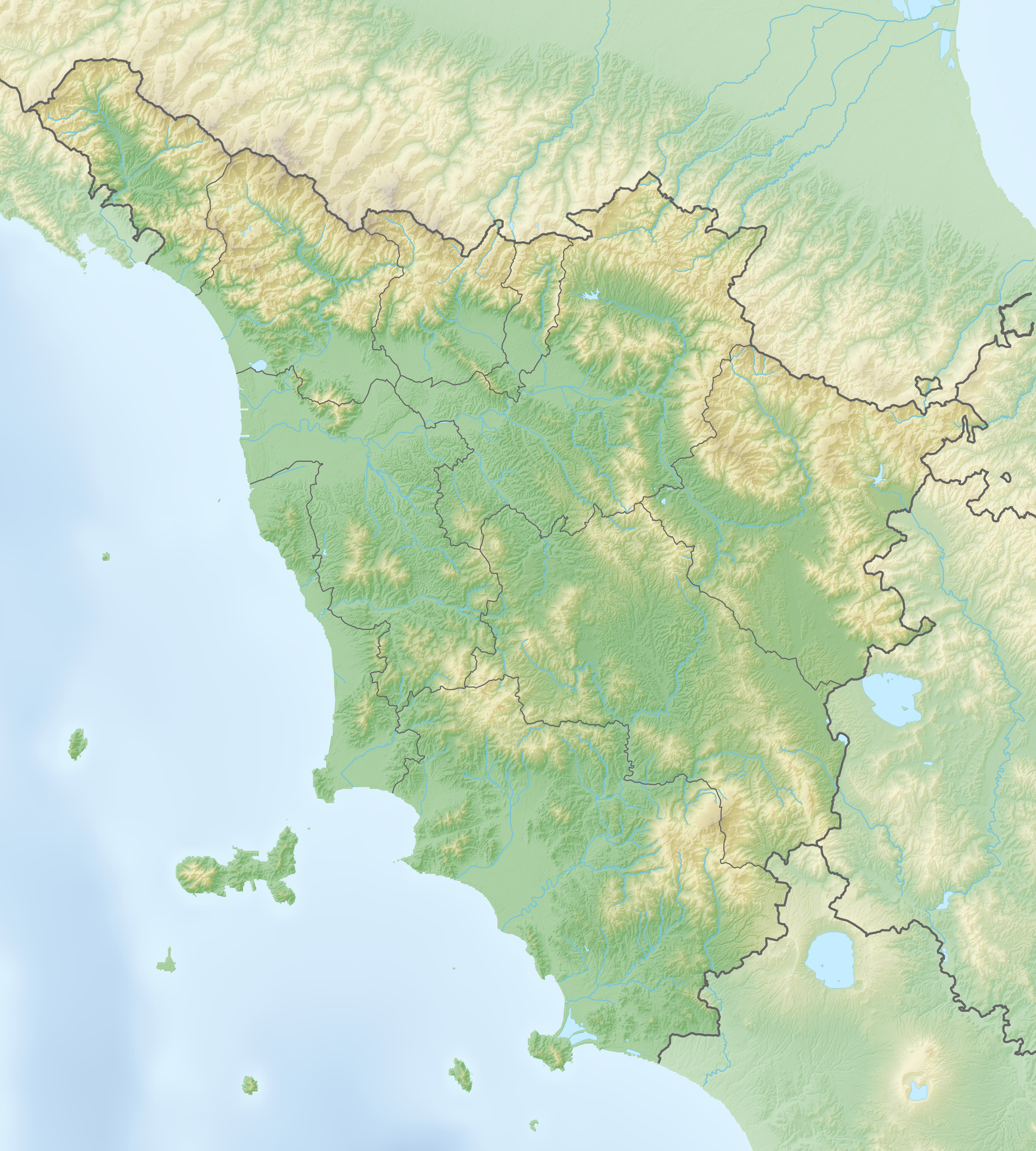
- Location within Tuscany
- Location: Lago Boracifero, Monterotondo Marittimo, Province of Grosseto, Tuscany
- Coordinates: 43°09′16.50″N 10°48′41.50″E
- Basin countries: Italy
- Surface elevation: 215 m (705 ft)

Boracifero Lake (Italian: Lago Boracifero) is a lake in the comune of Monterotondo Marittimo, in the Province of Grosseto, Tuscany, Italy.

The lake was formed from a volcanic crater in the 13th century. It has produced boric acid and geothermal heat since the early 20th century.

== See also ==
- Colline Metallifere
