= Boccheggiano =

- Frazione
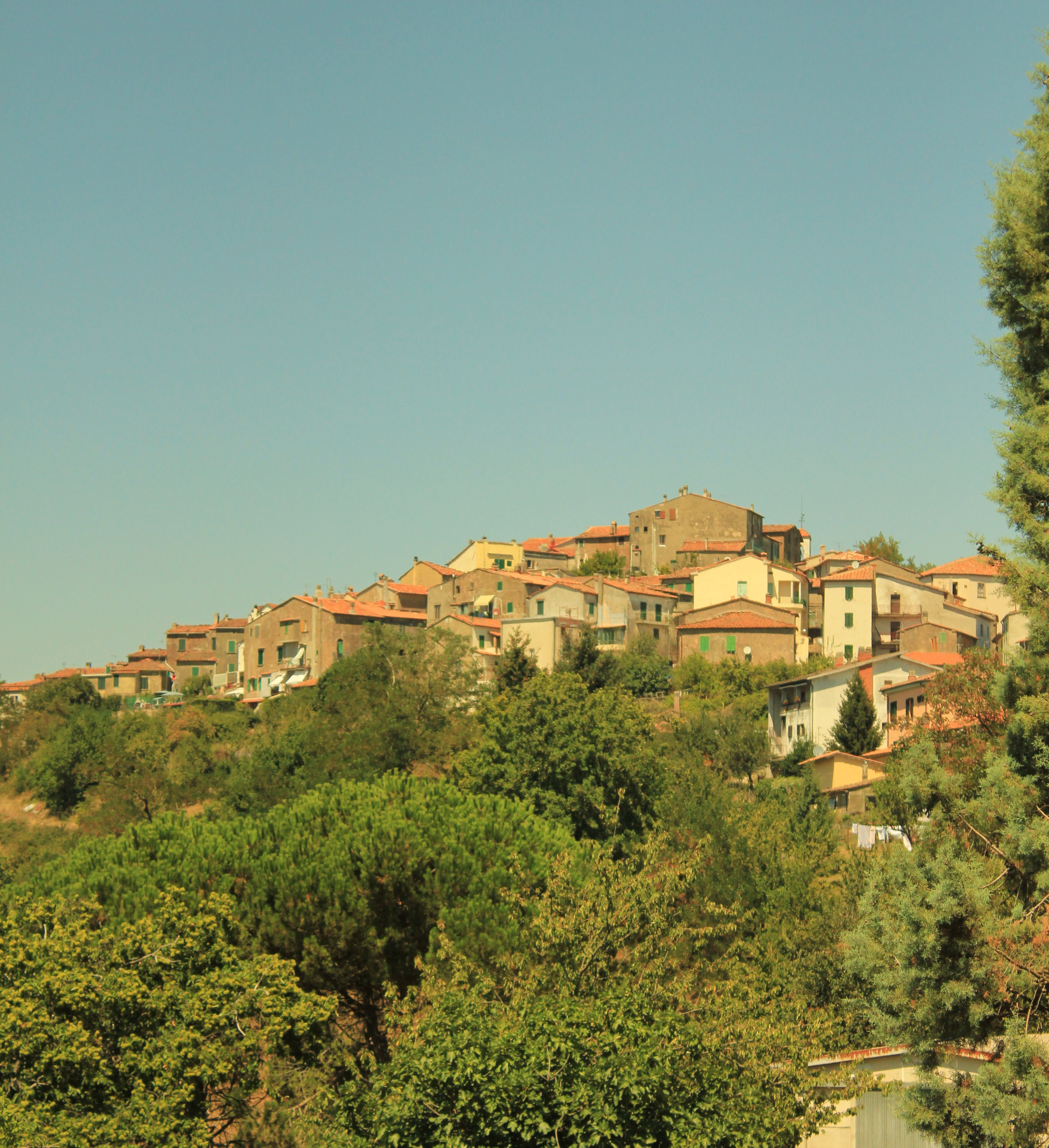
- View of Boccheggiano

- Location of Boccheggiano in Italy
- Coordinates: 43°5′25″N 11°2′1″E
- Country: Italy
- Region: Tuscany
- Province: Grosseto (GR)
- Comune: Montieri
- Elevation: 664 m (2,178 ft)

Population (2011)
  - Total: 311
- Demonym: Boccheggianesi
- Time zone: UTC+1 (CET)
  - Summer (DST): UTC+2 (CEST)
- Postal code: 58026
- Dialing code: (+39) 0564

Boccheggiano is a village in Tuscany, central Italy, administratively a frazione of the comune of Montieri, province of Grosseto, in the area of Colline Metallifere. At the time of the 2001 census its population amounted to 339.

Boccheggiano is about 48 km from Grosseto and 8 km from Montieri, and it is situated along the Provincial Road which links Massa Marittima with Monticiano. It was an important mining village.

== Main sights ==
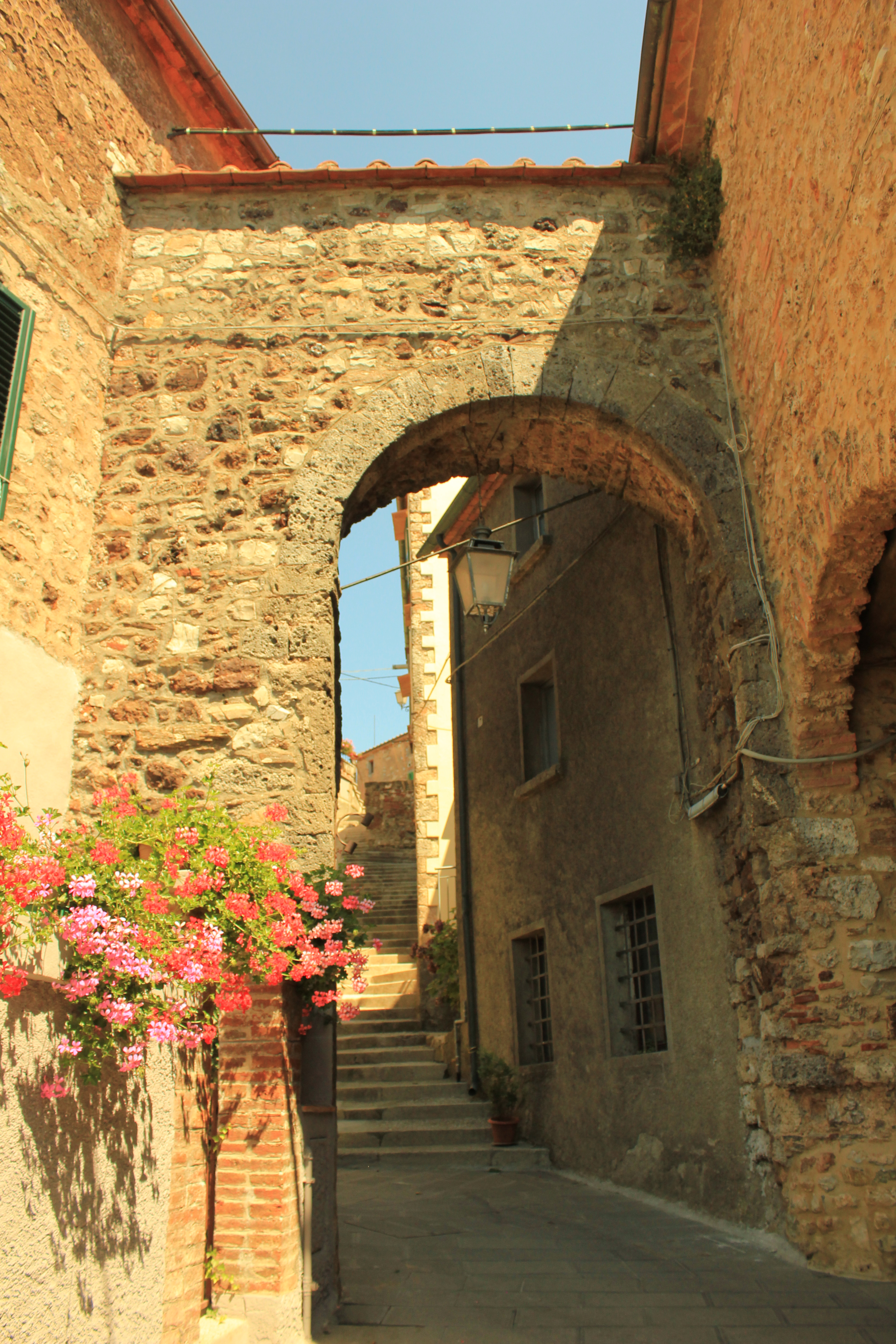
Porta della Torricella

- San Bartolomeo (15th century), main parish church of the village, it was restructured many times (in 1864, 1986, 1990).
- San Sebastiano (14th century), it was restructured in the 17th century.
- Walls of Boccheggiano, old fortifications which surround the village since the 13th century.
  - Porta della Torricella, main gate and access to the medieval village.
  - Porta di Villa, destroyed.
- Municipal Theatre of Boccheggiano, it was built in 1927.
- Giardino dei Suoni (Garden of Sounds), a park of contemporary art founded by artist Paul Fuchs.

== Bibliography ==
- Aldo Mazzolai, Guida della Maremma. Percorsi tra arte e natura, Le Lettere, Florence, 1997.

== See also ==
- Gerfalco
- Montieri
- Travale
