= Montecerboli =

- Frazione
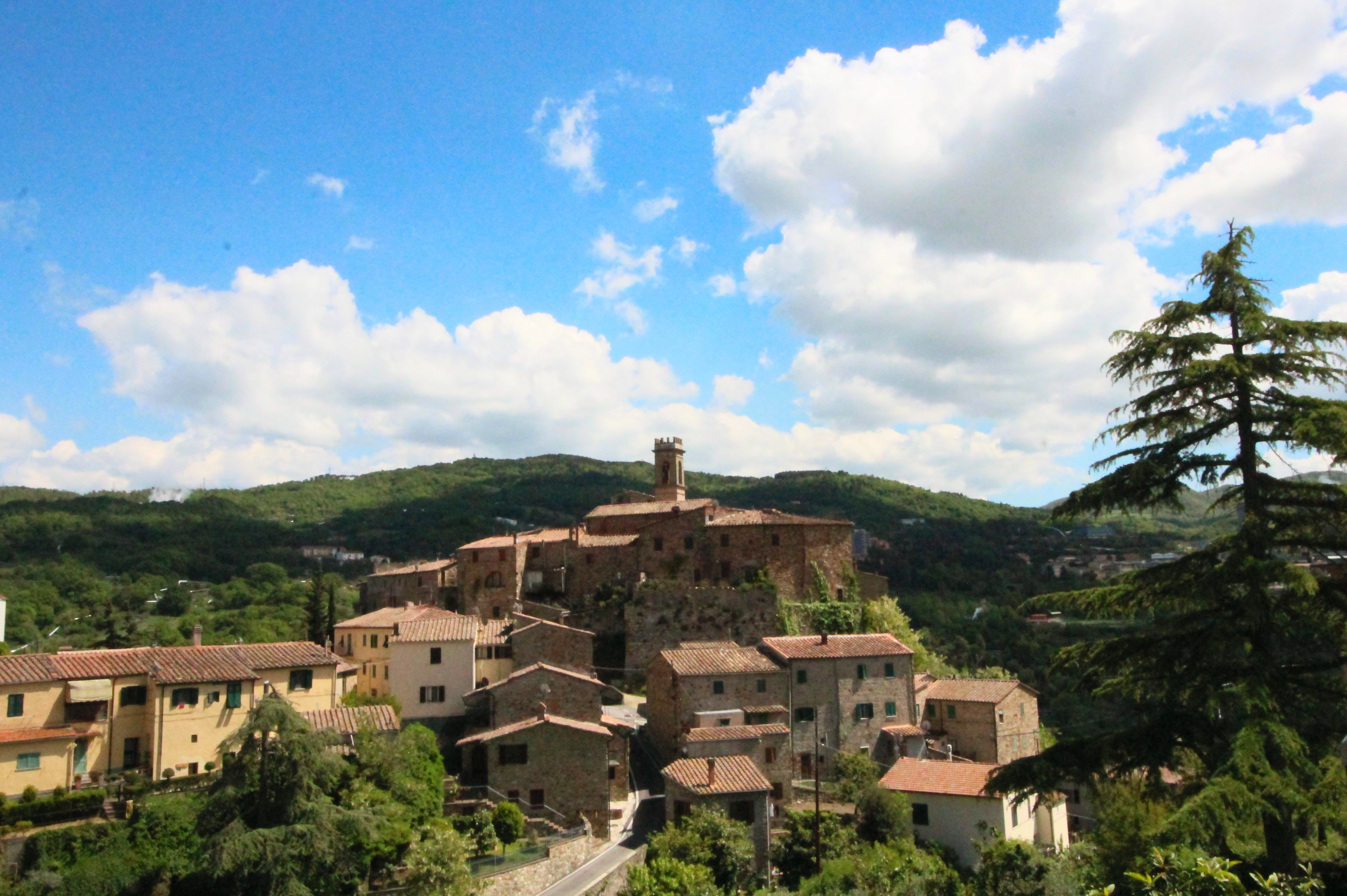

- Location of Montecerboli in Italy
- Coordinates: 43°14′56″N 10°52′50″E
- Country: Italy
- Region: Tuscany
- Province: Pisa (PI)
- Comune: Pomarance
- Elevation: 386 m (1,266 ft)

Population (2011)
  - Total: 783
- Demonym: Montecerbolini
- Time zone: UTC+1 (CET)
  - Summer (DST): UTC+2 (CEST)
- Postal code: 56044
- Dialing code: (+39) 0588

Montecerboli is a village in Tuscany, central Italy, administratively a frazione of the comune of Pomarance, province of Pisa. At the time of the 2011 census its population was 783.

Montecerboli is about 86 km from Pisa and 9 km from Pomarance.
