= Colline Metallifere =

Mountain in Italy

Coordinates: 43°11′N 10°56′E

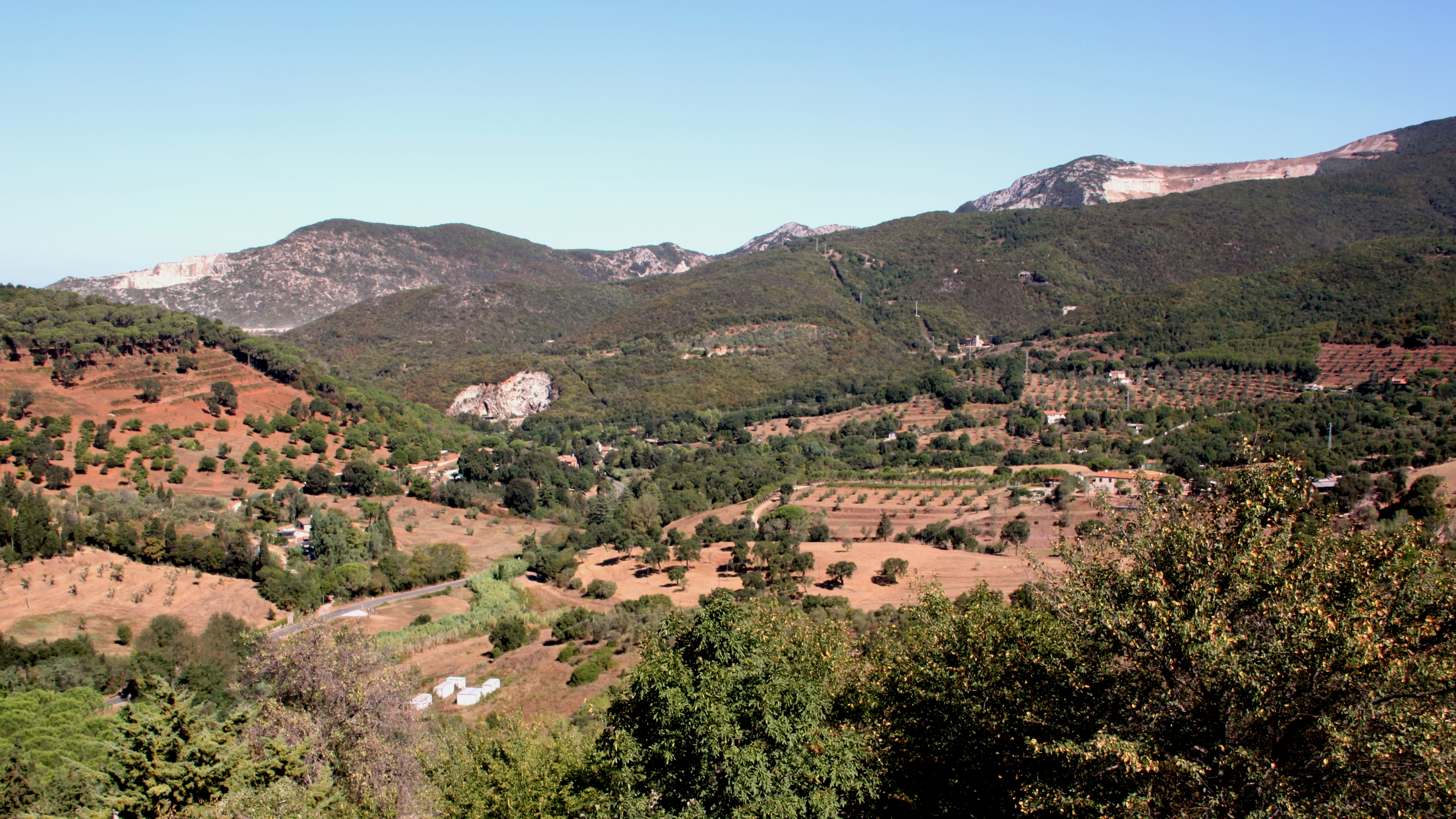
Colline Metallifere (view from Campiglia Marittima)

The Colline Metallifere (Italian: [kolˈliːne metalˈliːfere]), or the Metalliferous Hills ("Metal-bearing Hills"), are a mountain-hill group in the Tuscan Antiapennine, in central Italy. They occupy the central-western part of Tuscany, divided between the provinces of Livorno, Pisa, Siena and Grosseto.

The territory, with the exception of the Cornate di Gerfalco and Poggio di Montieri peaks, both above the 1,000 metres, is mostly hilly, with a rich variety of mineral resources, hence the name.

It also includes geothermic energy sources, part of which used in ENEL power plants at Larderello and Lago Boracifero. Rivers include the Cecina, the Cornia and the Merse.

The metal resources of the Colline Metallifere were exploited since ancient times by the Etruscans. Production reached its peak in the mid-19th century, declining quickly however afterwards. The numerous railways serving the mills are now mostly abandoned.

== Communes ==
=== Province of Livorno ===
- Sassetta
- Campiglia Marittima
- Suvereto

=== Province of Pisa ===
- Monteverdi Marittimo
- Pomarance
- Castelnuovo di Val di Cecina

=== Province of Siena ===
- Radicondoli
- Chiusdino

=== Province of Grosseto ===
- Monterotondo Marittimo
- Montieri
- Roccastrada
- Massa Marittima
- Gavorrano
- Scarlino
- Castiglione della Pescaia
