= Monterotondo Marittimo =

- Comune
- Comune di Monterotondo Marittimo
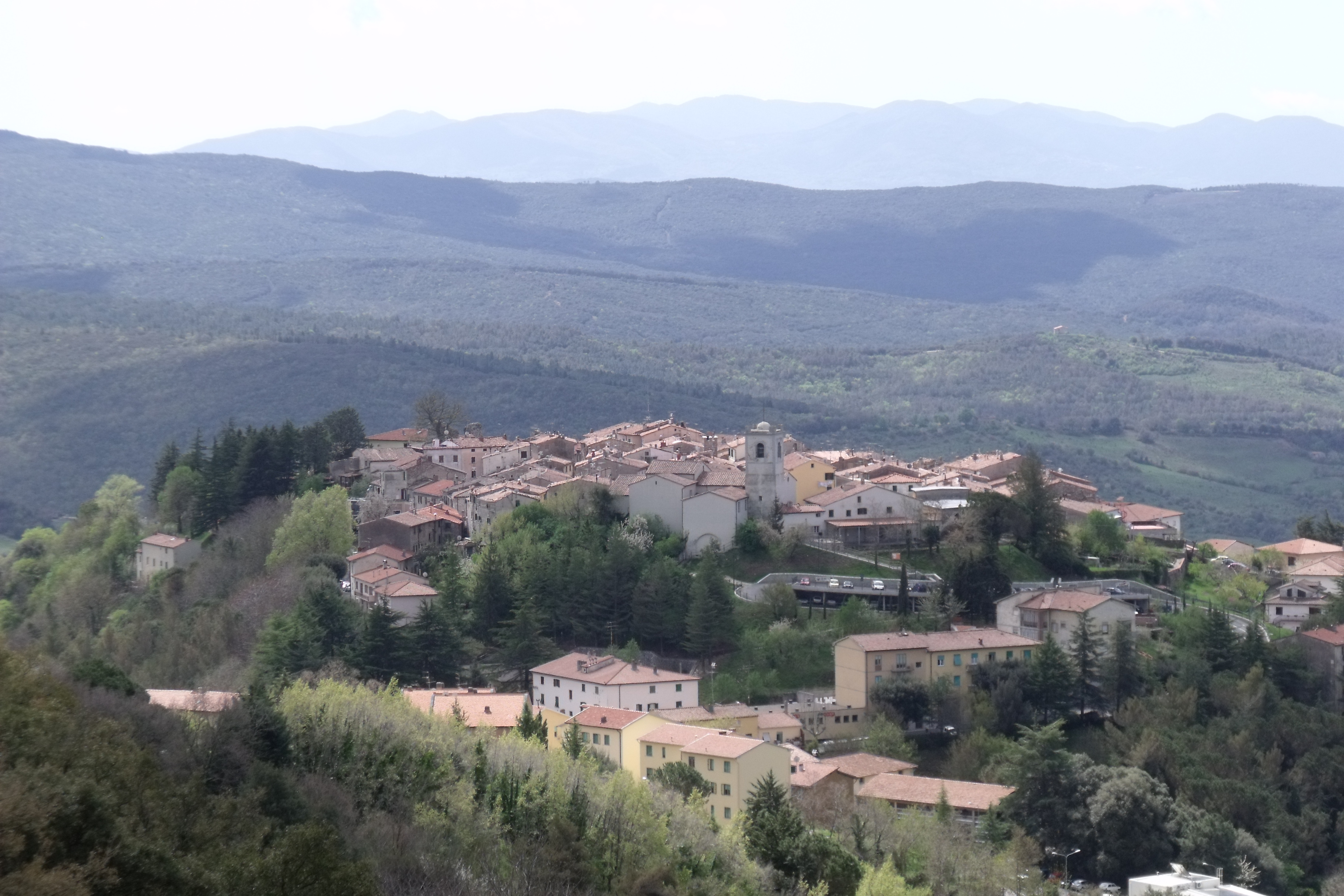
- Panorama of Monterotondo Marittimo

- Coat of arms

- Location within Italy Location within Tuscany
- Coordinates: 43°8′N 10°51′E
- Country: Italy
- Region: Tuscany
- Province: Grosseto (GR)
- Frazioni: Frassine, Lago Boracifero

Government
  - Mayor: Giacomo Termine

Area
  - Total: 102.59 km^{2} (39.61 sq mi)
- Elevation: 539 m (1,768 ft)

Population (1 January 2022)
  - Total: 1,284
  - Density: 12.52/km^{2} (32.42/sq mi)
- Demonym: Monterotondini
- Time zone: UTC+1 (CET)
  - Summer (DST): UTC+2 (CEST)
- Postal code: 58025
- Dialing code: 0566
- Patron saint: St. Lawrence
- Saint day: August 10
- Website: Official website

Monterotondo Marittimo is a comune (municipality) in the Province of Grosseto in the Italian region Tuscany, located about 80 kilometres (50 mi) southwest of Florence and about 45 kilometres (28 mi) northwest of Grosseto, near the Colline Metallifere.

== Frazioni ==
The municipality is formed by the municipal seat of Monterotondo Marittimo and the villages (frazioni) of Frassine and Lago Boracifero.
