= Montieri =

- Comune
- Comune di Montieri
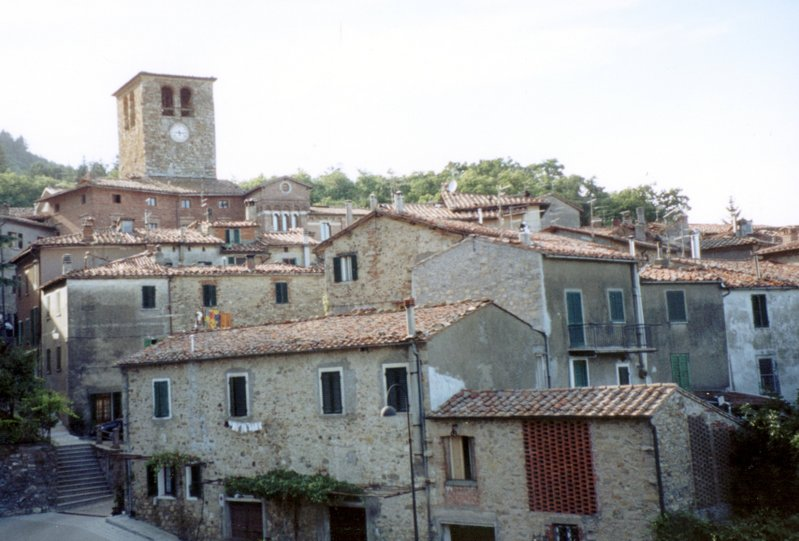

- Location within Italy Location within Tuscany
- Coordinates: 43°7′N 11°1′E
- Country: Italy
- Region: Tuscany
- Province: Grosseto (GR)
- Frazioni: Boccheggiano, Gerfalco, Travale

Government
  - Mayor: Nicola Verruzzi

Area
  - Total: 108.21 km^{2} (41.78 sq mi)
- Elevation: 704 m (2,310 ft)

Population (1 January 2022)
  - Total: 1,177
  - Density: 10.88/km^{2} (28.17/sq mi)
- Demonym: Montierini
- Time zone: UTC+1 (CET)
  - Summer (DST): UTC+2 (CEST)
- Postal code: 58026
- Dialing code: 0566
- Website: Official website

Montieri is a comune (municipality) in the Province of Grosseto in the Italian region Tuscany, located about 70 kilometres (43 mi) south of Florence and about 40 kilometres (25 mi) north of Grosseto.

Among the churches in the town is the 14th-century church of Santi Michele e Paolo with a painting attributed to Taddeo Gaddi.

== Frazioni ==
The municipality is formed by the municipal seat of Montieri and the villages (frazioni) of Boccheggiano, Gerfalco and Travale.
