= Ecology of the Chagos Archipelago =

Natural history of the Chagos Archipelago in the Indian Ocean

The atolls, reefs and submerged banks of the Chagos Archipelago seen by NASA's MODIS instrument, May 2015

The ecology of the Chagos Archipelago comprises the marine and terrestrial life of a group of coral atolls, reefs and submerged banks in the central Indian Ocean, at the southern end of the Chagos–Laccadive Ridge. The archipelago forms the British Indian Ocean Territory, which the United Kingdom administers, and is claimed by Mauritius; a treaty signed in 2025, under which the United Kingdom would recognise Mauritian sovereignty, had not entered into force by October 2026. It has more than 60,000 square kilometres (23,000 sq mi) of shallow limestone platform and reef but only about 60 km^{2} (23 sq mi) of land.

According to the territory's administration, the archipelago has the greatest marine biodiversity of the United Kingdom and its overseas territories, with more than 220 species of coral, 855 of fish and 355 of molluscs. In 2012 Sheppard and colleagues estimated that it held between a quarter and a half of the Indian Ocean's reef area remaining in excellent condition, and the reefs, largely free of local pollution, fishing and coastal development, are used as a scientific reference site. Marine heatwaves in 1998, 2015–2016 and 2024 killed much of their coral, and illegal fishing has depleted sharks and sea cucumbers. Green and hawksbill turtles, protected since 1968–1970, have increased several-fold since the 1990s.

The islands are young and their native flora and fauna are poor in species, with no native mammals and no endemic birds. During two centuries of coconut planting most of the native forest was cleared, and invasive black rats now occupy most of the land. Eighteen species of seabird breed, about 281,600 pairs in all, concentrated on the few rat-free islands; their droppings fertilise the nearby reefs, which are more productive than those beside rat-infested islands. The waters, apart from those of Diego Garcia, have been a no-take marine protected area since 2010, and Diego Garcia has a Ramsar site and several strict nature reserves. Scientific study of the archipelago began in the 1880s, and from 2017 a research programme funded by the Bertarelli Foundation involved more than 60 scientists.

== Setting and biogeography ==
=== Ecoregions ===
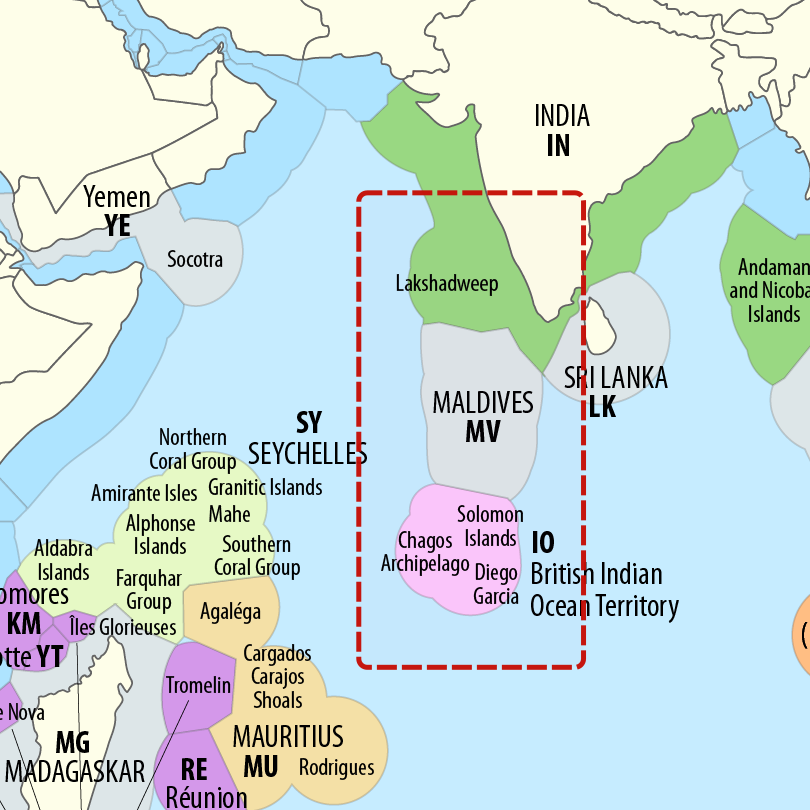
The Maldives–Lakshadweep–Chagos Archipelago tropical moist forests ecoregion

On land, the archipelago belongs with the Maldives and Lakshadweep to the Maldives–Lakshadweep–Chagos Archipelago tropical moist forests ecoregion, made up of three island groups along the submarine Chagos–Laccadive plateau. In the marine ecoregions of the world classification, Chagos is an ecoregion of the Central Indian Ocean province, which it shares with the Maldives. Its marine life, however, has closer affinities to the west. A survey of reef-building corals across the western Indian Ocean between 2002 and 2011 grouped Chagos with the species-rich northern Mozambique Channel, and an analysis of coral records on the IUCN Red List found Chagos more closely related to the western Indian Ocean than to the Maldives, India and Sri Lanka. Genetic studies of reef fishes likewise show an affinity with the western Indian Ocean, although the fish fauna also has links with the Indo-Polynesian province to the east.

=== Position and connectivity ===
The archipelago lies about 1,700 kilometres (1,060 mi) from the reefs of the Seychelles and 1,050 kilometres (650 mi) from the submerged Saya de Malha Bank to the west, while to the east there is no shallow water before the Cocos (Keeling) Islands, 2,750 kilometres (1,710 mi) away. Currents across Chagos flow towards south-east Asia from about January to April and towards the western Indian Ocean for much of the rest of the year; at typical current speeds, planktonic larvae would need about 65 days to reach shallow habitat to the east but only 35 and 25 days to reach the Seychelles and Saya de Malha respectively, well within the larval life of many reef organisms. Chagos is therefore described as a "stepping stone" for marine species between the two halves of the ocean, and Veron and colleagues called it the "Chagos Stricture" in the distribution of Indian Ocean corals.

Genetic work supports these links. Nesting and foraging hawksbill turtles in Chagos are related to those of the Seychelles but not to the rookeries of Western Australia; the archipelago's crown-of-thorns starfish belong to a southern Indian Ocean lineage with high gene flow; and the coconut crab population is distinct, with gene flow running mainly eastwards, from East Africa to the Seychelles and from the Seychelles to Chagos. The territory's 2012 management plan described Chagos as mainly a recipient of species from the west but also a supplier of larvae.

The archipelago lies at the eastern margin of the Seychelles–Chagos thermocline ridge, where cold water from below the thermocline rises close to the surface, and it is one of the two centres of action of the Indian Ocean Dipole. On ocean-facing reefs this cold water periodically rises into the depths where corals grow, lowering temperatures by 6–8 °C (11–14 °F) for a few days at a time.

== Marine ecosystems ==
=== Coral reefs ===
==== Extent and structure ====
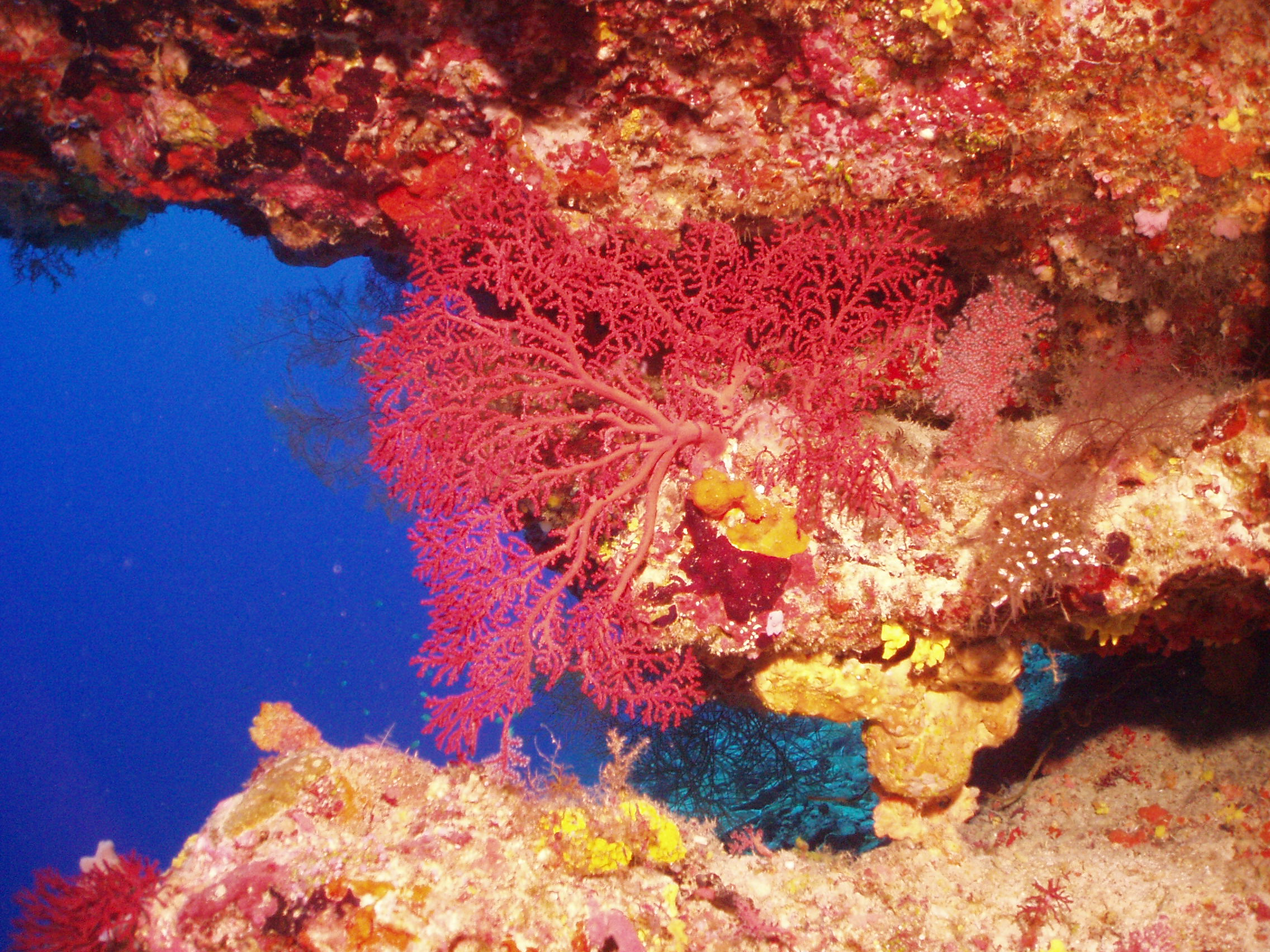
Corals on a reef in the Chagos Archipelago

The central part of the archipelago, about 200 by 300 km, contains five atolls with islands, one atoll awash at high tide and about a dozen more submerged at depths of 6–25 m; the Great Chagos Bank is described as the world's largest atoll by area. The sea floor within the photic zone covers about 60,000 square kilometres (23,000 sq mi), but how much of it is growing reef is unknown, because more than 95 per cent of the territory had never been studied by 2012. The BIOT Administration gives the area of shallow coral reef as about 4,000 square kilometres (1,500 sq mi). Video surveys in 2006 found hard coral cover significantly higher in the lagoons, at about 63 per cent, than on the ocean-facing slopes, at about 40 per cent, where soft corals were more abundant.

==== Coral species ====
At least 220 species of coral have been recorded, according to the Chagos Conservation Trust and the BIOT Administration, while Sheppard and colleagues gave about 300 reef-building species in 2017.

The brain coral Ctenella chagius is described as endemic by the Chagos Conservation Trust and the BIOT Administration, although a regional survey also recorded it at St. Brandon, Mauritius. No living colonies were found in surveys in 2017, after the heatwaves of 2015–2016, but about 20 colonies were found at a known site on Middle Brother in 2024. It was assessed as critically endangered on the IUCN Red List in 2024. Other corals have declined or vanished: the formerly common Diploastrea heliopora had not been seen since 1998, and Isopora palifera, once the main wave-breaking species on shallow reefs, was largely eliminated between 1979 and 1996.

Disease levels are low; a survey of eight sites in 2006 found disease in 5.2 per cent of colonies, at the low end of the range recorded worldwide. The same year, a survey of 42 sites found no non-native marine species, which Sheppard and colleagues described as the first such survey not to find species introduced by human activity.

==== Mass mortalities and recovery ====
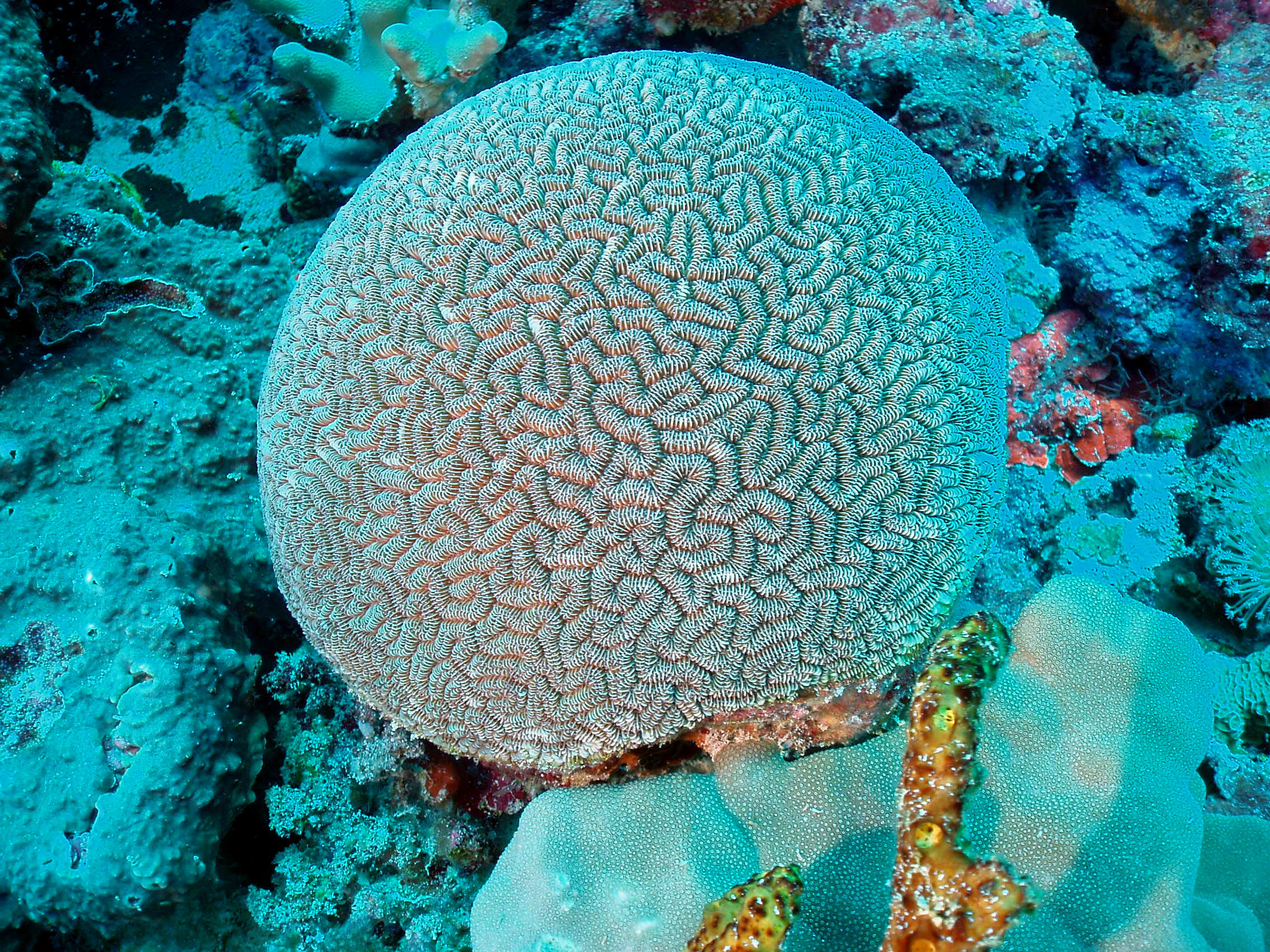
The brain coral Ctenella chagius

Coral cover on the ocean-facing slopes fell between the first survey, in 1978, and the next, in 1996, mainly through the loss of shallow branching and table corals, a decline later attributed to warming events. Severe warming in 1998 then killed almost all corals on several ocean-facing reefs down to clearly defined depths, which exceeded 40 m at Diego Garcia but were only 10–15 m in the northern atolls; lagoon reefs were much less affected. Recovery in Chagos was faster than elsewhere in the central Indian Ocean: by 2001 juvenile corals reached densities of up to 28 per square metre, the highest then recorded anywhere, shallow reefs regained their pre-1998 cover by 2010, and the table coral Acropora cytherea came to dominate many reefs. Sheppard and colleagues considered the lack of direct human pressure likely to be one of the main reasons for the reefs' good condition and rapid recovery.

Lesser bleaching followed in 2003, 2004, 2005 and 2010, and in 2012–2013 almost all the corals on the floor of the enclosed Salomon lagoon died. Bleaching returned on a large scale with back-to-back heatwaves in 2015 and 2016. Head and colleagues recorded a 60 per cent fall in coral cover, from 30 per cent in 2012 to 12 per cent in April 2016, including an 86 per cent decline in Acropora; in May 2016, 68 per cent of the surviving corals bleached again. By 2017 cover in water shallower than 15 m had fallen from 40–50 per cent to less than 10 per cent, soft corals had almost disappeared, and juvenile corals were far fewer than in 2012–2013. From monitoring going back to the late 1970s, Sheppard, Sheppard and Fenner reported in 2020 the regional extinction of some coral species and assemblages and a severe decline in coral settlement, and predicted that even if the reefs recovered they would contain fewer species.

Recovery was slow at first: at Peros Banhos, corals that settled after the bleaching made up only 2.4 per cent cover three years later. By 2021, however, fore-reef cover had returned to about 20 per cent, and surveys in 2023 found 30–50 per cent, approximately the pre-bleaching level. Another bleaching event in April–June 2024, when heat stress reached 7–10 degree heating weeks, affected between 5 and 85 per cent of the corals at different sites, with a mean of 35 per cent; surveys later that year found that about 23 per cent of live coral cover had died, with Peros Banhos worst affected and a lagoon site at Egmont untouched. The surveyors expected recovery within a few years in the absence of further bleaching.

==== Mesophotic reefs ====
Mesophotic coral reefs, at depths of 30–150 m, have been surveyed since 1905, and in several places close to 100 per cent coral cover has been recorded at these depths. Diving surveys are generally limited to about 25 m, so most of these reefs have not been examined. Modelling based on light, temperature, chlorophyll and the shape of the sea floor predicts extensive, previously undocumented mesophotic reefs across the archipelago. They are not immune to heat stress: in November 2019 corals at Egmont Atoll bleached at 90 m, although shallow corals did not, when a record positive phase of the Indian Ocean Dipole pushed warm surface water deeper.

==== Reef growth ====
Reefs grow when the calcium carbonate laid down by corals and coralline algae exceeds what is removed by erosion. Measurements on 28 reefs in early 2015 found an average net carbonate production of 3.7 kg per square metre a year, and 8.4 kg on reefs dominated by Acropora, which Perry and colleagues compared to rates before human disturbance; such reefs were growing upwards by 4.2 mm a year, faster than regional sea-level rise in the past and close to projections for the 21st century. Across twelve fore-reef sites, Lange and Perry found a 69 per cent decline in coral cover between 2015 and 2018 and a 77 per cent fall in coral carbonate production. Sheppard and colleagues considered that by 2017 the reefs had moved from vigorous growth to net erosion, and predicted that mass mortalities would recur too often by the late 2020s for any significant recovery of reef health. A study of shallow reefs in 2023 found the highest framework production in the lagoons, and higher production beside islands with dense seabird colonies, driven by faster coral calcification and less grazing by parrotfish.

=== Seagrass, lagoons and barachois ===
Seagrass was long thought to be scarce: in 2001 the Ramsar listing of Diego Garcia described the only known meadow of significant size, on the eastern side of the atoll's lagoon, where some fish species had been recorded that had not been seen elsewhere in the archipelago. An expedition in 2010 found many hectares of seagrass and a previously unknown mangrove forest of 3 km^{2} (1.2 sq mi). Green turtles tracked by satellite led researchers to extensive deep-water meadows of the seagrass Thalassodendron ciliatum on the Great Chagos Bank, where cover averaged 74 per cent at three sites spread over 128 km (80 mi), at depths to 29 m, with abundant fish and grey reef sharks. Later surveys of 29 sites, including the Great Chagos Bank and Speakers Bank, found meadows between 8 and 31 m deep composed entirely of this species; in December 2024 cameras in them recorded the first sliteye sharks known from the archipelago, a species listed as near threatened.

The lagoons range from the open lagoon of Peros Banhos, up to 60 m deep, to the smaller and more enclosed lagoon of the Salomon Islands, which warms more. On Diego Garcia the barachois have no mangroves and are almost unvegetated, apart from patches of a sterile grass at about the level of high spring tides.

=== Open ocean and deep sea ===
The waters of the Diego Garcia Ramsar site are classed as oligotrophic, or poor in nutrients. At Egmont, cold-water bores driven by internal waves flow up the atoll slope and into the lagoon on the rising tide, probably carrying zooplankton from the thermocline and creating feeding opportunities for manta rays. Using echosounders and baited cameras, Letessier and colleagues estimated that the top 200 m of the open water, over some 118,324 square kilometres (46,000 sq mi), held about 3.8, 33.1 and 4.1 million tonnes of fish in November 2012, January 2015 and February 2016 respectively.

The deep waters within the 200-nautical-mile limit include, according to modelling, 86 seamounts and 243 smaller knolls, more than a tenth of the seamounts in the Indian Ocean; the 2012 management plan put the number of seamounts at about 300. No deep-water fishing has been recorded there, but their fauna remained almost unexplored in 2012. A seamount in the south of the area, surveyed for the first time at 70–80 m in a study published in 2017, held large numbers of scalloped hammerhead sharks not seen elsewhere in the archipelago.

== Fish ==
=== Reef fish ===
Juvenile holotype of the wrasse Cirrhilabrus rubrisquamis, collected at Île Fouquet in Peros Banhos

The Chagos Conservation Trust has recorded at least 784 species of inshore fish, including the endemic Chagos clownfish (Amphiprion chagosensis), assessed as of least concern, and large wrasse and grouper that have been fished out of other reefs in the region. The Ramsar listing of Diego Garcia mentions at least two endemic fish species.

Underwater surveys in 2010 found reef fish biomass far higher than on fished or protected reefs in Kenya, the Seychelles, Madagascar and the Maldives, matched only by some remote, unfished reefs in the Pacific. The 2012 management plan put Chagos reef fish biomass at 6 to 100 times that of most other tropical areas. Comparing 324 reefs with 36 sites in Chagos as a baseline, McClanahan and Graham found that biomass in well-enforced reserves elsewhere levelled off at about 30 per cent of the Chagos value, and that the life-history make-up of fish communities recovered far more slowly than biomass. Unlike fish communities elsewhere in the Indian Ocean, those of Chagos remained stable through the coral mortality of 1998, and coral-feeding butterflyfishes showed no detectable decline.

=== Pelagic fish ===
Until 2010 licensed fisheries operated in the archipelago's waters. Taiwanese- and Japanese-flagged longliners fished year-round for yellowfin and bigeye tuna, swordfish, striped marlin and sailfish, taking 371 to 1,366 tonnes a year in the late 2000s, and mainly Spanish and French purse-seiners took yellowfin and skipjack tuna between November and March, with catches ranging from under 100 to about 24,000 tonnes a year; a Mauritian inshore fishery took snappers, emperors and groupers. By-catch, poorly recorded, was substantial, particularly of sharks, rays and billfish, and the last licences expired on 31 October 2010. Whether a closed area can protect such mobile species has been debated, although Koldewey and colleagues reviewed evidence that migratory species can benefit from no-take reserves. Stable isotopes show that silvertip sharks feed more on pelagic prey between October and January, possibly because of an influx of prey from outside the protected area.

=== Sharks ===
About 50 species of shark have been recorded. The number of reef sharks seen per scientific dive fell from an average of 4.2 in the 1970s to 0.4 in 2006, a decline of more than 90 per cent that Graham, Spalding and Sheppard attributed mainly to poaching; silvertip sharks increased from 1996, but blacktip and whitetip reef sharks were rarely encountered by 2006. Arrest records show that small Sri Lankan vessels fished illegally in the area from at least 1996, taking an estimated 4,000 to 25,000 sharks a year. Combining fisheries and survey data, Ferretti and colleagues estimated that in 2012 there were about 571,000 grey reef sharks and 32,000 silvertip sharks in the archipelago, about 79 and 7 per cent respectively of their unfished levels. The grey reef shark is listed as endangered and the silvertip as vulnerable on the IUCN Red List.

Baited camera surveys found that the biomass of plankton-eating fish was the strongest predictor of shark abundance, and that grey reef sharks at an isolated bank were smaller than elsewhere, suggesting a possible pupping site. Acoustic tracking of 101 reef sharks over three years identified movement corridors that could guide patrols against illegal fishing, and tracking from 2013 to 2020 showed that heat stress on the reefs reduced the residency of grey reef sharks, with effects lasting up to 16 months. Bryan Wilson, a scientific adviser to the Chagos Conservation Trust, told Mongabay in 2025 that shark numbers fell sharply again during the COVID-19 pandemic, when surveillance was reduced.

=== Rays ===
A manta ray in the waters of the British Indian Ocean Territory

The reef manta ray (Mobula alfredi), listed as vulnerable, feeds at an aggregation site at Egmont Atoll that supports, according to the Manta Trust's Joanna Harris, one of the most resident populations documented in the Indian Ocean; the atoll has been designated an Important Shark and Ray Area. Acoustic tags on 19 rays showed that their visits followed the tides and the arrival of cold, zooplankton-rich water through the narrow lagoon entrance. Until 2023 the reef manta was the only mobulid ray documented in the archipelago; a sighting of a sicklefin devil ray that year, and a review of earlier photographs, added the sicklefin, bentfin and spinetail devil rays, all three of which are listed as critically endangered. Photographs from seven illegal fishing vessels intercepted in the reserve showed 79 mobulids weighing about 20 tonnes, which Harris considered likely to be only a fraction of the true catch.

== Marine mammals ==
Sperm whales were hunted from Diego Garcia in the mid-19th century, and the dugong, once recorded in Chagos, has long been extinct there. A research vessel surveying sperm whales in 2002 recorded high cetacean abundance and diversity, including bottlenose, striped, pantropical spotted and Risso's dolphins, pilot whales, orcas and beaked whales.

The first dedicated cetacean study began in 2022, funded by the Bertarelli Foundation, after an IUCN task force had identified the archipelago as an "Area of Interest" for marine mammals for which data were lacking. Between November 2022 and June 2024 an observer on the patrol vessel recorded more than 100 sightings of at least 15 species. The commonest was the spinner dolphin, found mainly around Peros Banhos, Salomon and Diego Garcia; at Peros Banhos it rests in the lagoon by day and is thought to feed offshore at night. Both the common bottlenose dolphin, mostly offshore, and the Indo-Pacific bottlenose dolphin, associated with the atolls, are present, and sperm whales and Longman's and Cuvier's beaked whales were seen in deeper water. A resident pod of spinner dolphins is estimated to deposit about 288 kg of nitrogen a year, much of it from deep-water prey, inside a lagoon. Hydrophones off Egmont detected dolphin whistles on 78 per cent of days, and humpback whale song was recorded around the archipelago.

Larger whales recorded since 2002 include humpback, Bryde's and sperm whales, and the hydroacoustic monitoring station of the Comprehensive Nuclear-Test-Ban Treaty Organization near Diego Garcia has recorded blue and fin whales. A song type recorded in the central Indian Ocean, the "Chagos song", is thought to be produced by a previously unknown population of pygmy blue whales, whose seasonal movements appear to range from the central Indian Ocean around Chagos to the north of Western Australia.

== Sea turtles ==
Volunteers measuring a hawksbill sea turtle before tagging it on Diego Garcia, December 2019

=== Nesting ===
Green (Chelonia mydas) and hawksbill (Eretmochelys imbricata) turtles nest on all five atolls. Both were heavily exploited for about two centuries until they were protected in 1968 and 1970 respectively. In 1786 more nesting green turtles were taken at Salomon in four days than were estimated to nest there in a whole year in 1996. The hawksbill is listed as critically endangered; the green turtle, formerly listed as endangered, was reclassified globally as of least concern in 2025, although some regional subpopulations remain threatened.

Using monitoring of an index beach on Diego Garcia and surveys of 90 per cent of the coastline, Mortimer and colleagues estimated that about 6,300 hawksbill and 20,500 green turtle clutches were laid each year in 2011–2018, an increase of two to five times for hawksbills and four to nine times for green turtles since 1996, which they attributed to more than 40 years without significant exploitation. Diego Garcia and Peros Banhos account for about 90 per cent of hawksbill and 70 per cent of green turtle nesting, and the archipelago holds an estimated 39–51 per cent of the hawksbill clutches laid in the south-west Indian Ocean. Salomon, where every beach was easy to reach, has about a tenth of the nesting habitat but fewer than 5 per cent of the turtles, which Mortimer and colleagues linked to past hunting.

Satellite tags showed that individual green turtles lay an average of six clutches a season, about twice as many as previously assumed, so that the number of nesting females may be almost half earlier estimates. Relatively cool, often shaded nesting beaches are expected to produce roughly balanced hatchling sex ratios, unlike the strongly female-biased ratios of most rookeries.

=== Movements and foraging ===
Volunteers carrying turtles for tagging at Turtle Cove, Diego Garcia, October 2012

Turtle Cove in the Diego Garcia lagoon is a foraging ground for hundreds of immature hawksbill and green turtles, some of which have been recaptured there over decades; the 2012 management plan described this aggregation as unique, because human exploitation had eliminated most such aggregations elsewhere. High-accuracy tracking of 21 immature hawksbills in 2018–2019 found that 17 stayed in the lagoon where they were tagged, using areas averaging about 1 km^{2} (0.39 sq mi).

Adults travel much further. Seven of eight green turtles tagged after nesting on Diego Garcia migrated to foraging grounds often more than 1,000 km outside the reserve, one of them travelling 3,979 km, the longest published migration of an adult hard-shelled sea turtle. Turtles tracked to the Great Chagos Bank led to the discovery there of deep-water seagrass meadows. All 22 hawksbills tagged on Diego Garcia in a later study travelled to submerged banks within 200 km, mostly the Great Chagos Bank, where they foraged at mesophotic depths, typically 35–40 m. Illegal fishing camps on the islands took turtles in the past.

== Invertebrates ==
=== Marine invertebrates ===
Sea cucumbers have been heavily poached. Price and colleagues found densities at Diego Garcia, where there is no harvesting, several times those in the three exploited atolls, and a marked decline over four years in the valuable Stichopus chloronotus and Holothuria atra at Salomon and Peros Banhos, and in Holothuria nobilis at Peros Banhos; abundance fell as fishing pressure rose. A 2006 study of Sri Lankan trade estimated that 30 to 60 boats a year returned to Sri Lanka from Chagos with sea cucumbers until about 2007, of which three or four a year were intercepted; the 2012 management plan noted that recovery might take centuries. Holothuria nobilis is listed as critically endangered.

The BIOT Administration lists 355 species of molluscs. A survey of 54 dead coral colonies found 1,868 decapod crustaceans of 164 species, with at least 217 species estimated in total, 46 per cent of them found at only one atoll, and a study of amphipods described six species new to science among thirteen recorded. A heavy but localised outbreak of the coral-eating crown-of-thorns starfish was found at Eagle Island in 2012.

=== Coconut crab and land crabs ===
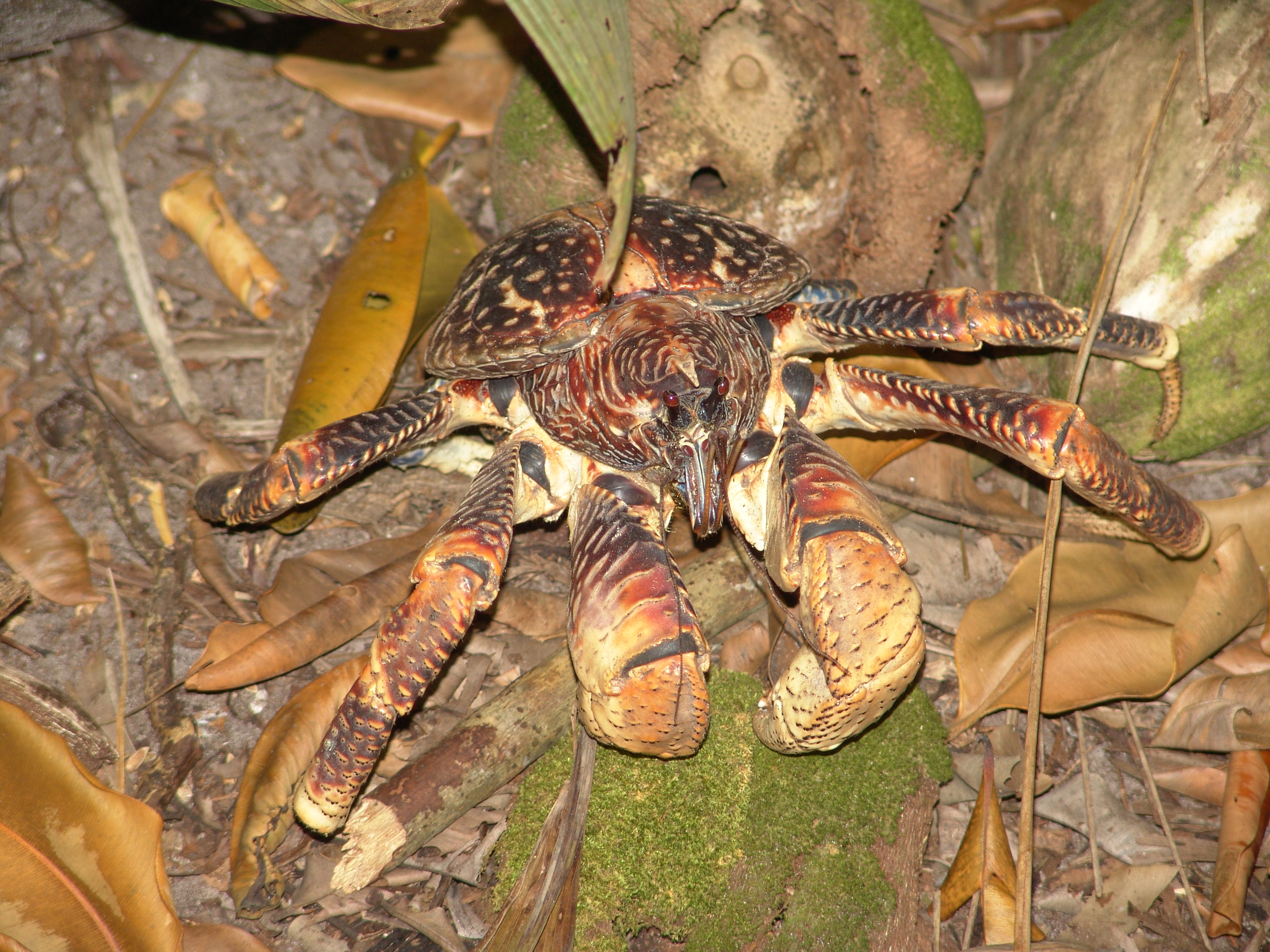
A coconut crab (left) and the land crab Cardisoma carnifex (right) on Diego Garcia, 2009

The coconut crab (Birgus latro), the largest land-dwelling invertebrate, can exceed 5 kg (11 lb), according to Sheppard and colleagues, and span more than a metre across its legs. It spends about a month as a larva at sea, then several years on land in borrowed seashells before it outgrows them; empty shells are scarce, being occupied mainly by three species of land hermit crab (Coenobita), and the shortage may limit recruitment. Although the coconut crab is rare across most of its range because of over-collection, the Chagos population is one of the least disturbed in the world. In 2010 the Ramsar area of Diego Garcia had an average of 298 crabs per hectare, the highest average density ever recorded, against 39 per hectare on the inhabited side of the atoll. The species was listed as data deficient on the IUCN Red List in 2011 and has since been assessed as vulnerable.

Land crabs are the dominant invertebrates on the northern islands; besides the coconut crab they include smaller hermit crabs and the burrowing land crab Cardisoma carnifex.

=== Terrestrial invertebrates ===
Most of the land invertebrates recorded are widespread Indo-Australian species, some associated with people, and three subspecies and one species of Lepidoptera are thought to be endemic. Surveys of Diego Garcia in 2021–2024 added more than 50 invertebrate species to the roughly 400 previously recorded there. Of the 24 ant species found, more than half were new to the island, many of them invasive, including the red imported fire ant; the surveys also found a centipede new to science, Australobius chagosensis, and the first Diego Garcia records of the endemic Chagos ground cricket, Scottiola chagosensis.

== Birds ==
A great frigatebird (left, 2009) and a white tern (centre, 2008) on Diego Garcia, and a masked booby (right) in the British Indian Ocean Territory

=== Seabirds ===
Eighteen species of seabird breed in the archipelago: two shearwaters, two tropicbirds, three boobies, two frigatebirds and nine terns and noddies. Counts on every island between 2008 and 2018 gave a maximum of 281,596 breeding pairs in a nominal year, 96 per cent of them sooty terns (70 per cent), lesser noddies (18 per cent) and red-footed boobies (8 per cent). The archipelago holds about 5.4 per cent of the world population of tropical shearwaters, 7.6 per cent of red-footed boobies and nearly 20 per cent of the regional population of sooty terns. All eighteen species are of least concern on the IUCN Red List.

Breeding patterns are complex. Sooty terns, up to about 200,000 pairs, nest in synchronised colonies at irregular intervals and change islands from year to year, perhaps because tick infestations make them desert colonies; red-footed boobies, up to about 21,000 pairs, lay in two peaks, in January and in June–July; and lesser noddies, about 50,000 pairs, breed mainly on three islands, Petite Bois Mangue, Nelson's Island and South Brother. The brown noddy declined from 1996 for reasons that remain unexplained, to about 3,000 pairs. Brown and masked boobies nest only on rat-free islands. The red-footed booby colony on Diego Garcia, in an area closed to personnel since 1984, grew from three or four pairs that year to more than 5,000 pairs by 2011.

At sea, red-footed boobies and wedge-tailed shearwaters are more abundant when the Indian Ocean Dipole is strong, and GPS-tracked red-footed boobies chose favourable winds to hunt flying fish, which they catch in the air.

=== Important Bird Areas ===
Ten islands were designated as Important Bird Areas (IBAs) by BirdLife International on the basis of seabird counts in 1975 and 1996, and two more were proposed after a survey in 2006. Reviewing ten years of counts, Carr and colleagues found that only one of them, Petite Bois Mangue, qualified every time it was surveyed, and that the brown noddy, which had qualified four islands, no longer bred in sufficient numbers; they recommended grouping the sites into four island clusters, because sooty terns shift between islands from year to year. BirdLife International now lists four IBAs, all assessed in 2020:

Important Bird and Biodiversity Areas (BirdLife International, assessed 2020)
IBA	Islands	Area (km^{2})	Qualifying species (breeding pairs, 2008–2018)
Eastern Diego Garcia island group	Eastern arm of Diego Garcia and the three islets in the lagoon mouth; replaces the former Barton Point IBA	33	Red-footed booby (9,969)
Western Great Chagos Bank island group	Danger Island, Sea Cow, Eagle Island, the Three Brothers and Resurgent; includes five former IBAs	6	Sooty tern (52,000), lesser noddy (15,735), red-footed booby (5,469), tropical shearwater (1,615)
Nelson's Island	Nelson's Island, on the northern rim of the Great Chagos Bank	1	Lesser noddy (12,000), red-footed booby (3,300)
Eastern Peros Banhos island group	Islands of Peros Banhos from Île du Passe to Île Vache Marine; includes three former IBAs and the two proposed in 2008	5	Sooty tern (145,000), lesser noddy (20,850)

The BIOT Administration's own pages still describe the ten earlier IBAs, which it says cover about 15 per cent of the land area and are protected as strict nature reserves.

=== History of the colonies ===
Early settlers found frigatebirds, boobies, noddies, terns, herons and tropicbirds breeding on Diego Garcia and considered them good eating, with feathers for bedding. The great colonies of the past were largely destroyed during the plantation era by guano mining and the clearance of nesting habitat, followed by persecution by people and by introduced rats, cats, dogs and pigs; by the early 20th century the colonies attested by guano deposits had gone across the archipelago. By 1967 seabirds on Diego Garcia were practically confined to the islets in the lagoon mouth. Black rats prey on eggs, chicks and adults: eight species now nest only on rat-free islands, and the eleven rat-free islands within designated or proposed IBAs held about 94 per cent of the archipelago's breeding seabirds.

=== Seabirds, rats and reefs ===
The archipelago's mix of rat-infested and rat-free islands has served as a natural experiment. Graham and colleagues found in 2018 that seabird densities were 760 times and nitrogen deposition 251 times higher on rat-free islands, and that seabird-derived nitrogen reached algae, sponges and fish on the adjacent reefs, where fish biomass was 48 per cent greater and grazing and bioerosion 3.2 and 3.8 times faster. After the 2015–2016 bleaching, coral cover fell by about a third whether or not seabirds were present, but reefs beside seabird islands gained more coralline and Halimeda algae and kept higher biomass of herbivorous and piscivorous fish. Later studies found that seabird nutrients doubled coral growth rates and that Acropora cover recovered in under four years after the heatwave near seabird islands; that a territorial damselfish beside rat-infested islands held larger territories and spent less time defending them; and that reefs near seabird colonies supported twice the biomass of small cryptic fishes and ten times the productivity of larger fish-eating fish. A modelling study predicted that removing rats from 25 islands could increase the numbers of the three most numerous seabird species on them 18-fold, and a study published in 2026 argued that restoring seabirds and native forest could help atoll reefs keep pace with sea-level rise under 2 °C of warming.

=== Land birds ===
A male Madagascar fody, an introduced bird, on Diego Garcia, 2007

There are no endemic birds. W. R. P. Bourne considered in 1971 that, apart from a local race of the little green heron and possibly a moorhen, the land birds were probably all introduced: the Madagascar fody and Madagascar turtle dove were present by 1884, and later arrivals included the house sparrow, cattle egret and common myna. By 2019 the Madagascar fody, found on most vegetated islands, and domestic chickens on a few islands were the only resident land birds in the northern atolls.

== Terrestrial ecosystems ==
=== Flora ===
Plants colonised the islands once soils had formed, probably within the last 4,000 years, arriving by wind and sea or with seabirds. Being young, remote and low-lying, the islands have a naturally poor flora of about 45 native species of higher plants, comprising 41 flowering plants (12 of them trees) and four ferns, none of them endemic. A checklist compiled by John Topp, the territory's conservation consultant, and colleagues at the Royal Botanic Gardens, Kew contained 278 taxa, 234 of them non-native and 128 of these recorded only on Diego Garcia; by 2025 about 420 species of flowering plants and ferns had been recorded, the increase reflecting introductions by people. Surveys of Diego Garcia between 2021 and 2024 added more than 1,500 plant records, including about 142 non-native taxa new to the island.

Mosses, liverworts, lichens, fungi and cyanobacteria are not diverse but are ecologically important: cyanobacteria cover limestone, sand and tree trunks and fix nitrogen in the poor soils, while mosses and liverworts stabilise the soil and are often the first stage of plant succession. A variety of liverwort, Cololejeunea planissima var. chagosensis, is known only from Chagos.

=== Vegetation ===
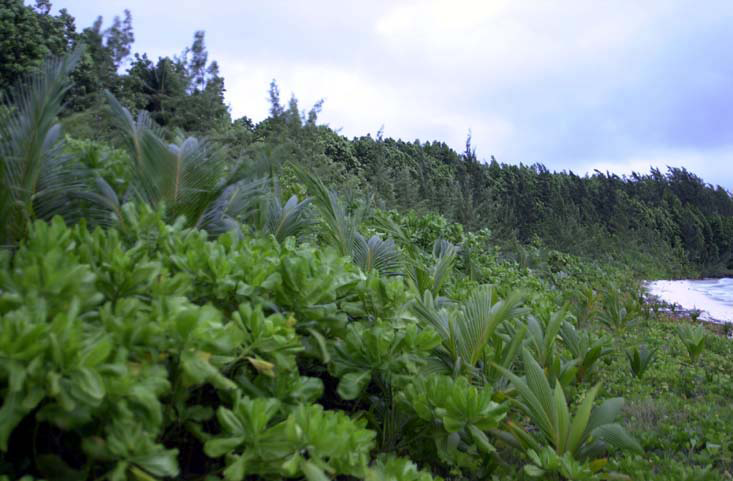
Ocean-side littoral scrub on Diego Garcia, 2005

Early accounts suggest that the islands were originally heavily forested, mainly with large Intsia bijuga trees. Intact native communities survive mainly on islands too small to have been planted, including Pisonia forest and Lumnitzera mangroves on Moresby Island, Scaevola–Argusia beach scrub on many islands and Calophyllum thickets on Île Takamaka.

On Diego Garcia, Stoddart found in 1967 that only the vegetation of the beach crests was relatively unaltered. A hedge of Scaevola taccada lined almost the entire seaward coast, about 64 km, reaching 6 m high and 50 m wide on the east coast but replaced by Tournefortia argentea on the windward south-east; large Calophyllum inophyllum and Barringtonia asiatica overhung the lagoon shore near East Point; and Hernandia sonora was the only common large native tree, Intsia and Pisonia having become rare. Stoddart listed three mangrove species from the archipelago: the native Sonneratia, on Moresby Island, and Xylocarpus moluccensis, dominant in a marsh on Île Boddam, and Rhizophora mucronata, introduced to Boddam from Mauritius in 1935. The 2012 management plan warned that the archipelago's two mangrove swamps, on Moresby and Eagle islands, would be lost within ten years unless encroaching coconut palms were controlled.

=== The plantation legacy ===
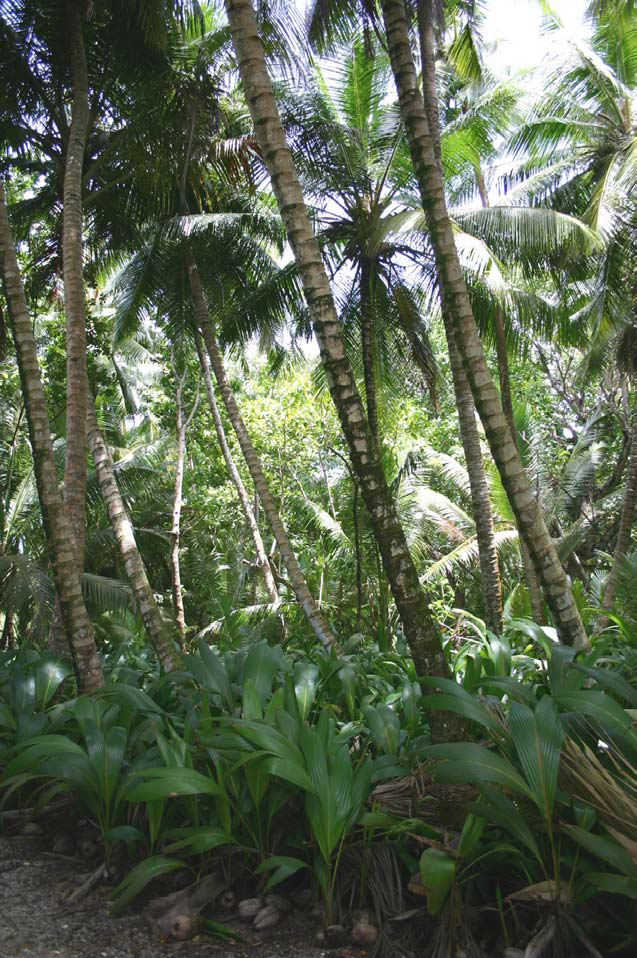
Cocos bon Dieu, dense coconut forest, on Diego Garcia, 2005

From the 18th century most of the native vegetation was replaced by coconut plantations; on Diego Garcia 6,250 of the atoll's 7,488 acres were under coconuts. More than 75 per cent of the native forest was cleared from 26 of the largest islands. Beyond the managed plantations, largely self-sown palms formed a denser woodland known as Cocos bon Dieu, with a lower layer of Morinda citrifolia, Pipturus argenteus and Guettarda speciosa. Young coconut palms now form a dense understorey that excludes almost all other plants, a condition conservationists call "coconut chaos". On Diego Garcia, a comparison of maps from 1967 with satellite images of 2005 showed that about 5.6 km^{2} (2.2 sq mi) had changed from coconut to broadleaf woodland.

Pilot plots on Diego Garcia have replaced coconuts with native trees such as Cordia subcordata. The anthropologist Laura Jeffery has noted that, while conservationists classify the coconut as an invasive alien detrimental to biodiversity, Chagossians value the plantations as part of a cultural landscape that once provided employment, food and artisanal products, and has suggested that the two groups could coordinate ecological restoration with restoration of that landscape.

=== Terrestrial fauna ===
There are no native mammals, not even bats, and no native amphibians. No snakes are recorded; the reptiles found by Stoddart in 1967 were house geckos, and two freshwater turtles collected on Diego Garcia in the 19th and early 20th centuries were probably introduced. Apart from the seabirds, the dominant land animals are crabs.

== Invasive species ==
=== Animals ===
The black rat, introduced about 230 years ago, is the most damaging invasive animal. Carr and colleagues recorded it on 26 islands making up 91.4 per cent of the land area; Harper, Carr and Pitman gave at least 30 islands and 95.3 per cent, with feral cats on 62 per cent. Settlers also introduced sheep, cattle, horses, donkeys, dogs, pigs and cats at various times; most have gone, but feral cats and donkeys remain. Donkeys and rats were present on Diego Garcia in the 1830s, and in 1967 the feral donkey population there may have numbered more than a hundred. A programme to eradicate feral cats on Diego Garcia was under way in 2001, but in 2019 the atoll still had both rats and cats.

Other introduced animals include the cane toad and the oriental garden lizard, first seen on Diego Garcia in May 2001, which spread rapidly and reached 172 per hectare in the inhabited area; strict quarantine of imported materials followed. Invasive ants are numerous on Diego Garcia, where surveys in 2021–2024 recorded 24 ant species, more than half of them new to the island.

=== Plants ===
Apart from the coconut, few introduced plants are invasive, but problem species include Casuarina equisetifolia, introduced for timber, which out-competes native trees; the spreading shrub Pipturus argenteus; and the native parasitic dodder Cassytha filiformis. Surveys of Diego Garcia in 2021 and 2022 recommended the immediate removal of two grasses, bushy bluestem (Andropogon glomeratus) and southern sandbur (Cenchrus echinatus), and of the tree Leucaena leucocephala, while their distribution was still limited.

=== Eradication ===
An attempt to clear rats from Eagle Island (252 ha (620 acres)) in 2006, using 2,864 bait stations, failed. In August 2014 a team hand-spread poison bait on Île Vache Marine (12 ha (30 acres)) in Peros Banhos and on two islets in the Salomon Islands, Île du Sel and Île Jacobin; checks in April 2017 found no rats, and breeding seabirds such as white terns had increased. When Carr revisited Île Vache Marine in November 2024 he found no rats but no significant increase in seabirds, which he attributed to its isolation, past disturbance by yacht crews and unsuitable vegetation; restoration, he concluded, needed rat eradication, vegetation management and time.

In July 2025 the Chagos Conservation Trust began a Darwin Plus project worth £878,127 to eradicate rats from four islands in north-eastern Peros Banhos, which, according to the project, would create a chain of 13 predator-free islands, the longest in the Indian Ocean. In November 2025 drones dropped bait on Moresby Island, Île de la Passe, Île Manoel and Île Yeye in two applications six days apart; if successful, the operation would leave a predator-free chain covering 145 ha (360 acres), and monitoring to confirm the result was planned for about November 2026. The trust's Healthy Islands, Healthy Reefs programme aims to clear rats from 30 islands, which it says would increase seabird nesting habitat by 350 per cent.

== Protected areas and management ==
=== Designations ===
Map of Peros Banhos showing the strict nature reserve

Within the Environment (Protection and Preservation) Zone declared in 2003, legislation controls fishing, pollution and the killing or collecting of animals. On land, the Diego Garcia Conservation (Restricted Area) Ordinance 1994 prohibits entry to the atoll's environmentally sensitive areas without a permit, and under the Strict Nature Reserve Regulations 1998 it is an offence to enter a strict nature reserve without written permission from the BIOT Administration. Strict nature reserves cover the islands of the Great Chagos Bank and a large part of Peros Banhos, together with their reefs and waters.

Diego Garcia was designated a Ramsar site on 4 July 2001. The site, of 35,424 ha (136.77 sq mi), covers the eastern arm, most of the lagoon and the seaward reefs to 3 nautical miles, but excludes the area set aside for the US naval facility. It qualified under seven of the eight Ramsar criteria, in part as habitat for threatened turtles and for regularly supporting 20,000 or more waterbirds, and its listing states that the archipelago "provides a standard for measuring the impact of human pressures on other coral reef systems". Under the 2025 treaty, the United Kingdom would confirm to the Ramsar Secretariat that the archipelago is part of Mauritius, but would keep responsibility for the site's environmental protection under its management plan.

Environmental designations in the Chagos Archipelago
Designation	Date	Extent	Legal basis
Fisheries Conservation and Management Zone	1 October 1991	200 nautical miles	BIOT Proclamation No. 1 of 1991
Diego Garcia Restricted Area	1994	Environmentally sensitive areas of Diego Garcia	Diego Garcia Conservation (Restricted Area) Ordinance 1994
Strict nature reserves	1998	Designated islands, including the former IBAs	Strict Nature Reserve Regulations 1998
Diego Garcia Ramsar site	4 July 2001	35,424 ha (136.77 sq mi)	Ramsar Convention; BIOT Conservation Policy Statement (1997)
Environment (Protection and Preservation) Zone	17 September 2003	Same as the fisheries zone	BIOT Proclamation No. 1 of 2003
Marine protected area	1 April 2010	About 640,000 square kilometres (247,000 sq mi), excluding Diego Garcia	BIOT Proclamation No. 1 of 2010

=== Marine protected area ===
On 1 April 2010 the BIOT Commissioner proclaimed a marine protected area (MPA) over the territory's waters to 200 nautical miles, excluding Diego Garcia and the waters within 3 nautical miles of it. The BIOT Administration gives its area as 640,000 square kilometres (247,000 sq mi) and says that it doubled the global no-take area. Mauritius protested against its declaration, and Chagossian groups argued that a ban on fishing would prevent them from returning. In 2015 an arbitral tribunal under the United Nations Convention on the Law of the Sea declared that in establishing the MPA the United Kingdom had breached Articles 2(3), 56(2) and 194(4) of the convention, but said that it had taken "no view on the substantive quality or nature of the MPA". In the treaty signed on 22 May 2025, the United Kingdom agreed to support Mauritius "in the establishment and management of its Marine Protected Area in the Chagos Archipelago". The Mauritian government has published plans for a Chagos Archipelago Marine Protected Area divided into four zones, in which no commercial fishing would be allowed. In February 2026 The Guardian reported that most of the area would be opened to some non-commercial fishing, which the newspaper described as an essential part of the Chagossians' return but which alarmed some conservationists.

=== Management ===
The BIOT Administration's Administrator, who is also Director of Fisheries, oversees enforcement of the MPA and conservation work, supported by staff seconded from bodies including the Department for Environment, Food and Rural Affairs and Natural England and by a Chief Scientific Adviser. A full-time patrol vessel carries a Senior Fisheries Protection Officer to intercept illegal fishing. The administration's core environment team has, according to its former Senior Environment Officer, never had more than three people, whose work ranges from reviewing planning applications and water-quality reports to setting fisheries enforcement policy. Its eleven conservation priorities include combating illegal fishing, eradicating rats, keeping out invasive species and managing plastic pollution.

The conservation management plan of 2012, written by Sheppard and other scientists, was deliberately simple, because most of the pressures that complicate other plans were absent; it recommended, among other things, monitoring coral cover every two years, reef fish every five years and breeding seabirds twice a year, restoring the mangroves of Moresby and Eagle islands, clearing debris from turtle beaches and eradicating rats from a small island in Peros Banhos.

== Scientific research ==
The scientist Nick Graham carrying out a fish count in the British Indian Ocean Territory

=== Early expeditions ===
The main early scientific investigations of Diego Garcia were made by Gilbert Bourne in 1885–1886 and by the German Valdivia expedition in 1899. In 1905 the Percy Sladen Trust Expedition in HMS Sealark, led by J. Stanley Gardiner, combined biological collecting with surveys, deep soundings and observations of tides and currents in the archipelago. It spent a week on Diego Garcia in July 1905 and also visited Peros Banhos, Egmont and Salomon. The first modern study was made in 1967 by four scientists nominated by the Royal Society and the Smithsonian Institution, who accompanied a hydrographic survey of Diego Garcia by HMS Vidal; their results were published in 1971 by the Smithsonian.

=== Expeditions from the 1970s ===
The Ramsar listing of Diego Garcia records scientific expeditions and visits in 1967, 1973, 1975, 1978–1979, 1996, 1999 and 2001. A Joint Services expedition to Danger Island counted seabirds on eight islands in 1975, and a Joint Services Chagos Research Expedition, based on the islands, worked across the atolls in 1978–1979, when coral cover was first measured. No research took place between 1979 and 1996, after which ship-based visits followed at irregular intervals; an expedition in 1996 surveyed 45 islands for seabirds. In 1999 the Linnean Society of London published Ecology of the Chagos Archipelago, a multi-author volume edited by Charles Sheppard and Mark Seaward. John Topp surveyed the plants of most of the islands in the 1980s and 1990s.

By 2012 there had been about a dozen scientific expeditions, involving more than 50 visiting scientists, and more than 200 papers drew on these and other work. Research visits require a permit from the BIOT Administration, which promotes the territory as an "observatory for undisturbed ecosystems".

=== Programmes and tracking ===
The Chagos Conservation Trust, a British charity founded as Friends of the Chagos and registered in 1994, promotes conservation, scientific and historical research and education about the archipelago. It has published the newsletter Chagos News and has led the rat eradications in the northern atolls. The Bertarelli Foundation, which had agreed in 2010 to fund policing of the reserve, sponsored an expedition in 2013 that placed 99 electronic tags on 95 animals and installed acoustic receivers around two northern atolls. Its Bertarelli Programme in Marine Science, coordinated by the Zoological Society of London, committed US$12 million to research in the reserve in its first phase, from 2017 to 2021, involving more than 60 scientists, and by September 2018 had attached 413 tags to ten species of ocean predator. A reef expedition under the programme in April 2019 surveyed 34 sites across the archipelago. The foundation has been the main source of funding for coral reef monitoring since 2016.

== Threats ==
Sailors from the naval support facility collecting litter on a beach on Diego Garcia, September 2020

=== Climate change and sea level ===
Marine heatwaves caused mass coral mortality in 1998, 2015–2016 and 2024, and climate models predict more frequent and more severe heatwaves. Loggers recorded a rise in water temperature of about one-third of a degree on ocean reefs and more than half a degree in lagoons between 2006 and 2017. Relative sea level at Diego Garcia rose by 6.22 mm a year between 2003 and 2015, faster than the global average, presumably partly because the atoll is subsiding. Shoreline erosion is significant in many places, with episodes of retreat exceeding a metre a year in parts of the northern atolls, and all the islands are vulnerable. In 2025 the territory's Chief Scientific Adviser reported that Middle Brother and West Island, important for nesting birds, were shrinking year by year, and that Diego Garcia risked a breach of its southern narrows.

=== Illegal fishing ===
The 2012 management plan described two forms of illegal fishing: camps on islands, which mainly took sea cucumbers but also turtles, sharks and birds, and boats, usually small Sri Lankan vessels, which mainly targeted sharks but were also caught with dolphins and manta rays on board; arrests of such vessels rose to twelve in 2011. Illegal vessels continue to travel hundreds of miles from India and Sri Lanka, according to the territory's former Senior Environment Officer. Drifting fish aggregating devices deployed by purse-seine fleets can pass through the reserve, gathering fish that are then caught outside it, or run aground on its reefs, especially on the Great Chagos Bank; in a modelling study, Curnick and colleagues found that more than a third of such devices posed one of these risks.

=== Marine debris and pollution ===
Despite very low chemical contamination, the beaches collect large amounts of debris, mostly plastics, polystyrene and rope from lost fishing gear and ships, much of it from south-east Asia, with more than 1,000 items per 500 m of beach recorded on the outer atolls. In a survey of 14 beaches in 2019, more than 60 per cent of the debris was plastic, and the heaviest accumulations overlapped with turtle nesting habitat.

=== Diego Garcia ===
Diego Garcia, the only inhabited atoll and site of the military base, lies outside the reserve. Sheppard and colleagues described the atoll in 2012, on the basis of pollutant monitoring, as "the least polluted inhabited atoll in the world". In March 2014 the Foreign Office minister Mark Simmonds told Parliament that US vessels moored in the lagoon had been discharging waste water, including treated sewage, since the early 1980s, contrary to British policy; UK scientists had concluded in 2013 that there were "elevated levels of nutrients in the lagoon which could be damaging to coral", and he announced a three-year plan for the United States to retrofit its vessels. The Independent reported that a report by the territory's environmental adviser had described the British patrol vessel Pacific Marlin as "a regular culprit in terms of sewage discharge" while docked at Diego Garcia. A government survey of the atoll's waters in March 2019 found low pollution overall, but levels of nutrients, oxygen deficiency, chemical contaminants and heavy metals at some sites in the slowly flushed lagoon that its authors considered a concern.

== See also ==
- Geography of the Chagos Archipelago
- List of islands in the Chagos Archipelago

== Sources ==
=== Court and tribunal decisions ===
- In the Matter of the Chagos Marine Protected Area Arbitration (Mauritius v. United Kingdom): Award (PDF). Permanent Court of Arbitration. 18 March 2015.
- Legal Consequences of the Separation of the Chagos Archipelago from Mauritius in 1965, Advisory Opinion (PDF). I.C.J. Reports 2019. International Court of Justice. 25 February 2019. p. 95.

=== Treaties and official documents ===
- Agreement between the Government of the United Kingdom of Great Britain and Northern Ireland and the Government of the Republic of Mauritius concerning the Chagos Archipelago including Diego Garcia (CS Mauritius No.1/2025, CP 1334) (Report). Foreign, Commonwealth and Development Office. 22 May 2025.
- "Marine Protected Area". British Indian Ocean Territory Administration.
- "Environment". British Indian Ocean Territory Administration.
- "Governance". British Indian Ocean Territory Administration.
- "Terrestrial Protected Areas". British Indian Ocean Territory Administration.
- "Science". British Indian Ocean Territory Administration.
- "Reef 2 Exped". British Indian Ocean Territory Administration.
- "BIOT Turtle Leaflet" (PDF) (Leaflet). British Indian Ocean Territory Administration. 2016.
- Spalding, Mark; Bourasseau, Marion (January 2025). Coral bleaching and mortality in the Chagos Archipelago, 2024 (PDF) (Report). British Indian Ocean Territory Administration.
- Sheppard, Charles; Carr, Peter; Graham, Nicholas; et al. (July 2012). Conservation and Management in British Indian Ocean Territory (Chagos Archipelago) (PDF) (Report). Archived from the original (PDF) on 2 November 2012.
- Consultation on whether to establish a marine protected area in the British Indian Ocean Territory (PDF) (Report). Foreign and Commonwealth Office. 10 November 2009. Archived from the original (PDF) on 12 May 2012.
- Simmonds, Mark (6 March 2014). "Minister for Africa updates Parliament on Diego Garcia" (Written statement to Parliament). Foreign and Commonwealth Office.
- "Diego Garcia Military Base and British Indian Ocean Territory Bill". Hansard, House of Lords. 13 October 2026.
- "Chagos Archipelago Marine Protected Area". Chagos Archipelago. Government of Mauritius.
- "Diego Garcia". Ramsar Sites Information Service. Secretariat of the Convention on Wetlands.
- Joint Nature Conservation Committee (February 2001). Ramsar Information Sheet: Diego Garcia (PDF) (Report). Ramsar Sites Information Service.
- "Chagos Conservation Trust, charity number 1031561". Register of Charities. Charity Commission for England and Wales.
- "Rewilding Northeast Peros Banhos, Chagos Archipelago (DPLUS221)". Darwin Plus.

=== Books and journals ===
- Andradi-Brown, Dominic A.; et al. (2019). "The Chagos Archipelago". In Loya, Yossi; Puglise, Kimberly A.; Bridge, Tom C. L. (eds.). Mesophotic Coral Ecosystems. Coral Reefs of the World. Vol. 12. Cham: Springer. pp. 215–229. doi:10.1007/978-3-319-92735-0_12. ISBN 978-3-319-92735-0.
- Benkwitt, Cassandra E.; et al. (December 2023). "Seabirds boost coral reef resilience". Science Advances. 9 (49) eadj0390. doi:10.1126/sciadv.adj0390. PMC 10699780. PMID 38055814.
- Benkwitt, Cassandra E.; Wilson, Shaun K.; Graham, Nicholas A. J. (August 2019). "Seabird nutrient subsidies alter patterns of algal abundance and fish biomass on coral reefs following a bleaching event" (PDF). Global Change Biology. 25 (8): 2619–2632. doi:10.1111/gcb.14643. PMID 31157944.
- Bourne, W. R. P. (1971). "The birds of the Chagos Group, Indian Ocean". Atoll Research Bulletin (149). Smithsonian Institution: 175–207.
- Carr, Peter; et al. (March 2021). "Status and phenology of breeding seabirds and a review of Important Bird and Biodiversity Areas in the British Indian Ocean Territory". Bird Conservation International. 31 (1): 14–34. doi:10.1017/S0959270920000295. hdl:10871/122331.
- Cumberlidge, N. (2020). "Birgus latro". IUCN Red List of Threatened Species. 2020 e.T2811A126813586. doi:10.2305/IUCN.UK.2020-2.RLTS.T2811A126813586.en.
- Curnick, David J.; et al. (April 2019). "Evidence for dynamic resource partitioning between two sympatric reef shark species within the British Indian Ocean Territory". Journal of Fish Biology. 94 (4): 680–685. doi:10.1111/jfb.13938. PMC 6849741. PMID 30784087.
- Curnick, David J.; Feary, David A.; Cavalcante, Geórgenes H. (August 2021). "Risks to large marine protected areas posed by drifting fish aggregation devices". Conservation Biology. 35 (4): 1222–1232. doi:10.1111/cobi.13684. PMC 8419855. PMID 33314325.
- Diaz, Clara; et al. (October 2023). "Mesophotic coral bleaching associated with changes in thermocline depth". Nature Communications. 14 (1) 6528. doi:10.1038/s41467-023-42279-2. PMC 10579316. PMID 37845210.
- Diaz, Clara; et al. (April 2025). "Predicting the distribution of mesophotic coral ecosystems in the Chagos Archipelago". Ecology and Evolution. 15 (4) e71130. doi:10.1002/ece3.71130. PMC 11962199. PMID 40177687.
- Dunn, Ruth E.; et al. (February 2025). "Island restoration to rebuild seabird populations and amplify coral reef functioning". Conservation Biology. 39 (1) e14313. doi:10.1111/cobi.14313. PMC 11780216. PMID 38887868.
- Dunn, Ruth E.; Trevail, Alice M.; et al. (August 2025). "Commuting in crosswinds and foraging in fast winds: the foraging ecology of a flying fish specialist". Proceedings of the Royal Society B. 292 (2052) 20250774. doi:10.1098/rspb.2025.0774. PMC 12320947. PMID 40758188.
- Esteban, Nicole; et al. (February 2016). "Male hatchling production in sea turtles from one of the world's largest marine protected areas, the Chagos Archipelago". Scientific Reports. 6 20339. doi:10.1038/srep20339. PMC 4735811. PMID 26832230.
- Esteban, Nicole; Mortimer, Jeanne A.; Hays, Graeme C. (February 2017). "How numbers of nesting sea turtles can be overestimated by nearly a factor of two". Proceedings of the Royal Society B. 284 (1849) 20162581. doi:10.1098/rspb.2016.2581. PMC 5326529. PMID 28202810.
- Esteban, Nicole; et al. (September 2018). "The discovery of deep-water seagrass meadows in a pristine Indian Ocean wilderness revealed by tracking green turtles". Marine Pollution Bulletin. 134: 99–105. doi:10.1016/j.marpolbul.2018.03.018. PMID 29573811.
- Ferretti, Francesco; et al. (March 2018). "Shark baselines and the conservation role of remote coral reef ecosystems". Science Advances. 4 (3) eaaq0333. doi:10.1126/sciadv.aaq0333. PMC 5842041. PMID 29532033.
- Gardiner, J. Stanley (October 1905). "The Percy Sladen Expedition in H.M.S. Sealark: the Chagos Archipelago". Nature. 72 (1875): 571–572. doi:10.1038/072571a0.
- Graham, Nicholas A. J.; et al. (July 2018). "Seabirds enhance coral reef productivity and functioning in the absence of invasive rats" (PDF). Nature. 559 (7713): 250–253. doi:10.1038/s41586-018-0202-3. PMID 29995864.
- Graham, Nicholas A. J.; et al. (October 2026). "Seabirds and native vegetation drive ecosystem processes that support atoll island resilience". Science Advances. 12 (42) eaei1145. doi:10.1126/sciadv.aei1145. PMC 13665944. PMID 42873883.
- Graham, Nicholas A. J.; Spalding, Mark D.; Sheppard, Charles R. C. (July 2010). "Reef shark declines in remote atolls highlight the need for multi-faceted conservation action". Aquatic Conservation: Marine and Freshwater Ecosystems. 20 (5): 543–548. doi:10.1002/aqc.1116.
- Gunn, Rachel L.; et al. (January 2023). "Terrestrial invasive species alter marine vertebrate behaviour". Nature Ecology and Evolution. 7 (1): 82–91. doi:10.1038/s41559-022-01931-8. PMC 9834043. PMID 36604551.
- Hamylton, Sarah; East, Holly (November 2012). "A geospatial appraisal of ecological and geomorphic change on Diego Garcia Atoll, Chagos Islands (British Indian Ocean Territory)". Remote Sensing. 4 (11): 3444–3461. doi:10.3390/rs4113444.
- Harper, G. A.; Carr, P.; Pitman, H. (2019). "Eradicating black rats from the Chagos – working towards the whole archipelago" (PDF). In Veitch, C. R.; Clout, M. N.; Martin, A. R.; Russell, J. C.; West, C. J. (eds.). Island invasives: scaling up to meet the challenge. Occasional Paper of the IUCN Species Survival Commission no. 62. Gland: IUCN. pp. 26–30.
- Harris, Joanna L.; et al. (May 2021). "Fine-scale oceanographic drivers of reef manta ray (Mobula alfredi) visitation patterns at a feeding aggregation site". Ecology and Evolution. 11 (9): 4588–4604. doi:10.1002/ece3.7357. PMC 8093739. PMID 33976833.
- Harris, Joanna L.; Collins, Claire; Spalding, Mark; Stevens, Guy M. W. (May 2024). "First records of the sicklefin (Mobula tarapacana), bentfin (Mobula thurstoni), and spinetail (Mobula mobular) devil rays in the Chagos Archipelago". Journal of Fish Biology. 104 (5): 1628–1632. doi:10.1111/jfb.15678. PMID 38332477.
- Hays, Graeme C.; et al. (December 2014). "Use of long-distance migration patterns of an endangered species to inform conservation planning for the world's largest marine protected area". Conservation Biology. 28 (6): 1636–1644. doi:10.1111/cobi.12325. PMID 25039538.
- Hays, Graeme C.; et al. (October 2021). "High accuracy tracking reveals how small conservation areas can protect marine megafauna". Ecological Applications. 31 (7) e02418. doi:10.1002/eap.2418. PMID 34278636.
- Hays, Graeme C.; et al. (February 2024). "Remote submerged banks and mesophotic ecosystems can provide key habitat for endangered marine megafauna". Science Advances. 10 (8) eadl2838. doi:10.1126/sciadv.adl2838. PMC 10881038. PMID 38381823.
- Head, Catherine E. I.; et al. (October 2018). "Exceptional biodiversity of the cryptofaunal decapods in the Chagos Archipelago, central Indian Ocean". Marine Pollution Bulletin. 135: 636–647. doi:10.1016/j.marpolbul.2018.07.063. PMID 30301083.
- Head, Catherine E. I.; et al. (August 2019). "Coral bleaching impacts from back-to-back 2015–2016 thermal anomalies in the remote central Indian Ocean". Coral Reefs. 38 (4): 605–618. doi:10.1007/s00338-019-01821-9.
- Hoare, V.; et al. (August 2022). "Spatial variation of plastic debris on important turtle nesting beaches of the remote Chagos Archipelago, Indian Ocean". Marine Pollution Bulletin. 181 113868. doi:10.1016/j.marpolbul.2022.113868. PMID 35835050.
- Jabado, R. W.; et al. (2025a). "Mobula mobular". IUCN Red List of Threatened Species. 2025 e.T110847130A279075986. doi:10.2305/IUCN.UK.2025-2.RLTS.T110847130A279075986.en.
- Jabado, R. W.; et al. (2025b). "Mobula tarapacana". IUCN Red List of Threatened Species. 2025 e.T60199A279077133. doi:10.2305/IUCN.UK.2025-2.RLTS.T60199A279077133.en.
- Jabado, R. W.; et al. (2025c). "Mobula thurstoni". IUCN Red List of Threatened Species. 2025 e.T60200A279078290. doi:10.2305/IUCN.UK.2025-2.RLTS.T60200A279078290.en.
- Jacoby, David M. P.; et al. (September 2020). "Shark movement strategies influence poaching risk and can guide enforcement decisions in a large, remote marine protected area". Journal of Applied Ecology. 57 (9): 1782–1792. doi:10.1111/1365-2664.13654. hdl:10919/98852.
- Jeannot, Laura-Li; et al. (July 2026). "Contrasting cryptofaunal responses to seabird nutrient inputs illuminate coral reef productivity pathways". Ecology. 107 (7) e70453. doi:10.1002/ecy.70453. PMC 13390649. PMID 42484553.
- Jeffery, Laura Rebecca (December 2014). "Ecological restoration in a cultural landscape: conservationist and Chagossian approaches to controlling the 'coconut chaos' on the Chagos Archipelago". Human Ecology. 42 (6): 999–1006. doi:10.1007/s10745-014-9696-y. PMC 4266453. PMID 25525289.
- Koldewey, Heather J.; et al. (November 2010). "Potential benefits to fisheries and biodiversity of the Chagos Archipelago/British Indian Ocean Territory as a no-take marine reserve". Marine Pollution Bulletin. 60 (11): 1906–1915. doi:10.1016/j.marpolbul.2010.10.002. PMID 20965522.
- Lange, Ines D.; Perry, Chris T. (August 2019). "Bleaching impacts on carbonate production in the Chagos Archipelago: influence of functional coral groups on carbonate budget trajectories". Coral Reefs. 38 (4): 619–624. doi:10.1007/s00338-019-01784-x. hdl:10871/36110.
- Lange, Ines D.; Stuhr, Marleen; Perry, Chris T.; Gea-Neuhaus, Aitana (2026). "Carbonate framework and sediment production across island-fringing coral reef habitats and a natural nutrient gradient". Scientific Reports. 16 (1) 18938. doi:10.1038/s41598-026-49702-w. PMC 13275797. PMID 42031963.
- Leroy, Emmanuelle C.; et al. (April 2021). "Multiple pygmy blue whale acoustic populations in the Indian Ocean: whale song identifies a possible new population". Scientific Reports. 11 (1) 8762. doi:10.1038/s41598-021-88062-5. PMC 8062560. PMID 33888792.
- Letessier, Tom B.; et al. (September 2022). "Estimating pelagic fish biomass in a tropical seascape using echosounding and baited stereo-videography". Ecosystems. 25 (6): 1400–1417. doi:10.1007/s10021-021-00723-8.
- Letessier, T. B.; Johnston, J.; Delarue, J.; Martin, B.; Anderson, R. C. (September 2022). "Spinner dolphin residency in tropical atoll lagoons: diurnal presence, seasonal variability and implications for nutrient dynamics". Journal of Zoology. 318 (1): 10–22. doi:10.1111/jzo.13000.
- Marshall, A.; et al. (2022). "Mobula alfredi". IUCN Red List of Threatened Species. 2022 e.T195459A214395983. doi:10.2305/IUCN.UK.2022-1.RLTS.T195459A214395983.en.
- McClanahan, T. R.; Graham, N. A. J. (December 2015). "Marine reserve recovery rates towards a baseline are slower for reef fish community life histories than biomass". Proceedings of the Royal Society B. 282 (1821) 20151938. doi:10.1098/rspb.2015.1938. PMC 4707748. PMID 26702040.
- Mortimer, J. A.; Donnelly, M. (2008). "Eretmochelys imbricata". IUCN Red List of Threatened Species. 2008 e.T8005A12881238. doi:10.2305/IUCN.UK.2008.RLTS.T8005A12881238.en.
- Mortimer, Jeanne A.; et al. (May 2020). "Estimates of marine turtle nesting populations in the south-west Indian Ocean indicate the importance of the Chagos Archipelago". Oryx. 54 (3): 332–343. doi:10.1017/S0030605319001108.
- Myers, A. A. (January 2014). "Amphipoda (Crustacea) from the Chagos Archipelago". Zootaxa. 3754 (1): 1–31. doi:10.11646/zootaxa.3754.1.1. PMID 24869678.
- Myers, R.; Rocha, L. A.; Allen, G. (2017). "Amphiprion chagosensis". IUCN Red List of Threatened Species. 2017 e.T188507A1885502. doi:10.2305/IUCN.UK.2017-2.RLTS.T188507A1885502.en.
- Obura, David (September 2012). "The diversity and biogeography of Western Indian Ocean reef-building corals". PLoS ONE. 7 (9) e45013. doi:10.1371/journal.pone.0045013. PMC 3446983. PMID 23028737.
- Painting, Suzanne J.; et al. (July 2021). "Marine water quality at Diego Garcia: a preliminary study of pollution levels in coastal and lagoon waters". Frontiers in Marine Science. 8 671319. doi:10.3389/fmars.2021.671319.
- Perez-Correa, Julian; et al. (September 2020). "Climate oscillation and the invasion of alien species influence the oceanic distribution of seabirds". Ecology and Evolution. 10 (17): 9339–9357. doi:10.1002/ece3.6621. PMC 7487247. PMID 32953065.
- Perry, Chris T.; et al. (December 2015). "Remote coral reefs can sustain high growth potential and may match future sea-level trends". Scientific Reports. 5 18289. doi:10.1038/srep18289. PMC 4680928. PMID 26669758.
- Price, A. R. G.; et al. (January 2010). "Chagos feels the pinch: assessment of holothurian (sea cucumber) abundance, illegal harvesting and conservation prospects in British Indian Ocean Territory". Aquatic Conservation: Marine and Freshwater Ecosystems. 20 (1): 117–126. doi:10.1002/aqc.1054.
- Purcell, S.; Gamboa, R.; Conand, C. (2026). "Holothuria nobilis". IUCN Red List of Threatened Species. 2026 e.T180326A272675560. doi:10.2305/IUCN.UK.2026-1.RLTS.T180326A272675560.en.
- Rigby, C. L.; et al. (2024). "Carcharhinus albimarginatus". IUCN Red List of Threatened Species. 2024 e.T161526A124499982. doi:10.2305/IUCN.UK.2024-1.RLTS.T161526A124499982.en.
- Sampath, Udayanga; et al. (October 2025). "Occurrence of delphinids off Egmont Atoll, Chagos Archipelago: detection, characterisation, and temporal variability of vocalisations". The Journal of the Acoustical Society of America. 158 (4): 3226–3238. doi:10.1121/10.0039671. PMID 41117809.
- Sheppard, C. R. C.; et al. (March 2012). "Reefs and islands of the Chagos Archipelago, Indian Ocean: why it is the world's largest no-take marine protected area". Aquatic Conservation: Marine and Freshwater Ecosystems. 22 (2): 232–261. doi:10.1002/aqc.1248. PMC 4260629. PMID 25505830.
- Sheppard, Charles; et al. (November 2017). "Coral bleaching and mortality in the Chagos Archipelago". Atoll Research Bulletin (613): 1–26. doi:10.5479/si.0077-5630.613.
- Sheppard, Charles; Sheppard, Anne; Fenner, Douglas (May 2020). "Coral mass mortalities in the Chagos Archipelago over 40 years: regional species and assemblage extinctions and indications of positive feedbacks". Marine Pollution Bulletin. 154 111075. doi:10.1016/j.marpolbul.2020.111075. PMID 32319906.
- Simpfendorfer, C.; et al. (2020). "Carcharhinus amblyrhynchos". IUCN Red List of Threatened Species. 2020 e.T39365A173433550. doi:10.2305/IUCN.UK.2020-3.RLTS.T39365A173433550.en.
- Stoddart, D. R. (1971). "Settlement and development of Diego Garcia". Atoll Research Bulletin (149). Smithsonian Institution: 209–217.
- Stoddart, D. R. (1971a). "Scientific studies at Diego Garcia Atoll". Atoll Research Bulletin (149). Smithsonian Institution: 1–6. doi:10.5479/si.00775630.147.1.
- Stoddart, D. R. (1971d). "Land vegetation of Diego Garcia". Atoll Research Bulletin (149). Smithsonian Institution: 127–142.
- Stoddart, D. R. (1971e). "Terrestrial fauna of Diego Garcia and other Chagos atolls". Atoll Research Bulletin (149). Smithsonian Institution: 163–170.
- Stratford, John E.; et al. (October 2025). "Fate-tracking early coral recruits following bleaching in a remote reef ecosystem". Coral Reefs. 44 (5): 1651–1667. doi:10.1007/s00338-025-02732-8. PMC 12500822. PMID 41064478.
- Tickler, David M.; et al. (May 2017). "Drivers of abundance and spatial distribution of reef-associated sharks in an isolated atoll reef system". PLOS ONE. 12 (5) e0177374. doi:10.1371/journal.pone.0177374. PMC 5451018. PMID 28562602.
- Wallace, B. P.; Broderick, A. C. (2025). "Chelonia mydas". IUCN Red List of Threatened Species. 2025 e.T4615A285108125. doi:10.2305/IUCN.UK.2025-2.RLTS.T4615A285108125.en.
- Williamson, Michael J.; et al. (September 2024). "Environmental stress reduces shark residency to coral reefs". Communications Biology. 7 (1) 1018. doi:10.1038/s42003-024-06707-3. PMC 11385207. PMID 39251811.
- Wilson, B.; Cowburn, B.; Obura, D. O. (2024). "Ctenella chagius". IUCN Red List of Threatened Species. 2024 e.T133701A129471211. doi:10.2305/IUCN.UK.2024-2.RLTS.T133701A129471211.en.

=== News and other sources ===
- Arjanee, Ameerah (2 October 2026). "UK-Mauritius Chagos sovereignty deal stalls amid fears of further delays". Al Jazeera English.
- Balcombe, George (January 2026). "My reflections on three years in the British Indian Ocean Territory" (PDF). Chagos News. No. 63. Chagos Conservation Trust. pp. 30–31. ISSN 2046-7222.
- "Tagging of Pelagics". Bertarelli Foundation. 2013. Archived from the original on 4 October 2013.
- "Eastern Diego Garcia island group". BirdLife Data Zone. BirdLife International.
- "Western Great Chagos Bank island group". BirdLife Data Zone. BirdLife International.
- "Nelson Island". BirdLife Data Zone. BirdLife International.
- "Eastern Peros Banhos island group". BirdLife Data Zone. BirdLife International.
- "British Indian Ocean Territory". BirdLife Data Zone. BirdLife International.
- Carr, Peter (January 2025). "Vache Marine – 10 years after" (PDF). Chagos News. No. 62. Chagos Conservation Trust. pp. 13–15. ISSN 2046-7222.
- "Coconut crabs". Chagos Conservation Trust. Archived from the original on 5 July 2012.
- "Corals". Chagos Conservation Trust. Archived from the original on 7 July 2012.
- "Fish". Chagos Conservation Trust. Archived from the original on 5 July 2012.
- "Healthy Islands, Healthy Reefs". Chagos Conservation Trust.
- "Plants". Chagos Conservation Trust. Archived from the original on 12 December 2012.
- Clubbe, Colin; et al. (January 2025). "Plants of the Chagos Archipelago" (PDF). Chagos News. No. 62. Chagos Conservation Trust. pp. 6–9. ISSN 2046-7222.
- Dasgupta, Shreya (17 October 2025). "Green turtle rebounds, moving from 'endangered' to 'least concern'". Mongabay.
- Embling, Clare (January 2025). "Discovering the whales and dolphins of the Chagos Archipelago" (PDF). Chagos News. No. 62. Chagos Conservation Trust. pp. 16–21. ISSN 2046-7222.
- Friends of the Chagos (February 2003). "Expedition of the Odyssey" (PDF). Chagos News. No. 21. p. 5. ISSN 1355-6746. Archived from the original (PDF) on 16 March 2016.
- Harris, Joanna (January 2026a). "Building local capacity for mobulid monitoring in a remote marine protected area" (PDF). Chagos News. No. 63. Chagos Conservation Trust. pp. 10–13. ISSN 2046-7222.
- Harris, Danielle (January 2026b). "Searching for giants around the Chagos Archipelago" (PDF). Chagos News. No. 63. Chagos Conservation Trust. pp. 18–24. ISSN 2046-7222.
- Haverson, Pete (January 2026). "Rewilding Peros Banhos in the Chagos Archipelago" (PDF). Chagos News. No. 63. Chagos Conservation Trust. pp. 25–29. ISSN 2046-7222.
- Horton, Helena (3 February 2026). "Plan to allow fishing around Chagos Islands alarms conservationists". The Guardian.
- "Billionaire saves marine reserve plans". The Independent. Press Association. 12 September 2010.
- Jones, Rachel (23 October 2018). "Perspective: First reports from comprehensive, in-depth study of a large remote MPA". MPA News. OpenChannels.
- Laidre, Mark E. (January 2025). "Lives of coconut crabs: from sea to land" (PDF). Chagos News. No. 62. Chagos Conservation Trust. pp. 22–25. ISSN 2046-7222.
- Milmo, Cahal (28 March 2014). "Exclusive: British Government under fire for pollution of pristine lagoon". The Independent.
- "Maldives-Lakshadweep-Chagos Archipelago Tropical Moist Forests". One Earth.
- Oulton, Charlotte; et al. (January 2026). "A first sighting of the sliteye shark (Loxodon macrorhinus) in the Chagos Archipelago: implications for deepwater seagrass habitats and fish assemblages" (PDF). Chagos News. No. 63. Chagos Conservation Trust. pp. 6–9. ISSN 2046-7222.
- Peyton, Jodey; et al. (January 2025). "New invertebrate discoveries on Diego Garcia" (PDF). Chagos News. No. 62. Chagos Conservation Trust. pp. 10–12. ISSN 2046-7222.
- Vidal, John (29 March 2010). "Chagos Islanders attack plan to turn archipelago into protected area". The Guardian.
- Vyawahare, Malavika (15 December 2025). "A deal signals a new chapter for Chagossians, and one of the world's largest marine no-fishing zones". Mongabay.
