= Kymo (disambiguation) =

Kymo may refer to:

- Kymo, a Greek island
- Kymo, or Cymo, one of the Nereids

KYMO may refer to:

- KYMO (AM), a radio station (1080 AM) licensed to East Prairie, Missouri, United States
- KYMO-FM, a radio station (105.3 FM) licensed to East Prairie, Missouri, United States

== See also ==
- Cymo (disambiguation)
