= Edoardo Milesi =

Italian architect (born 1954)

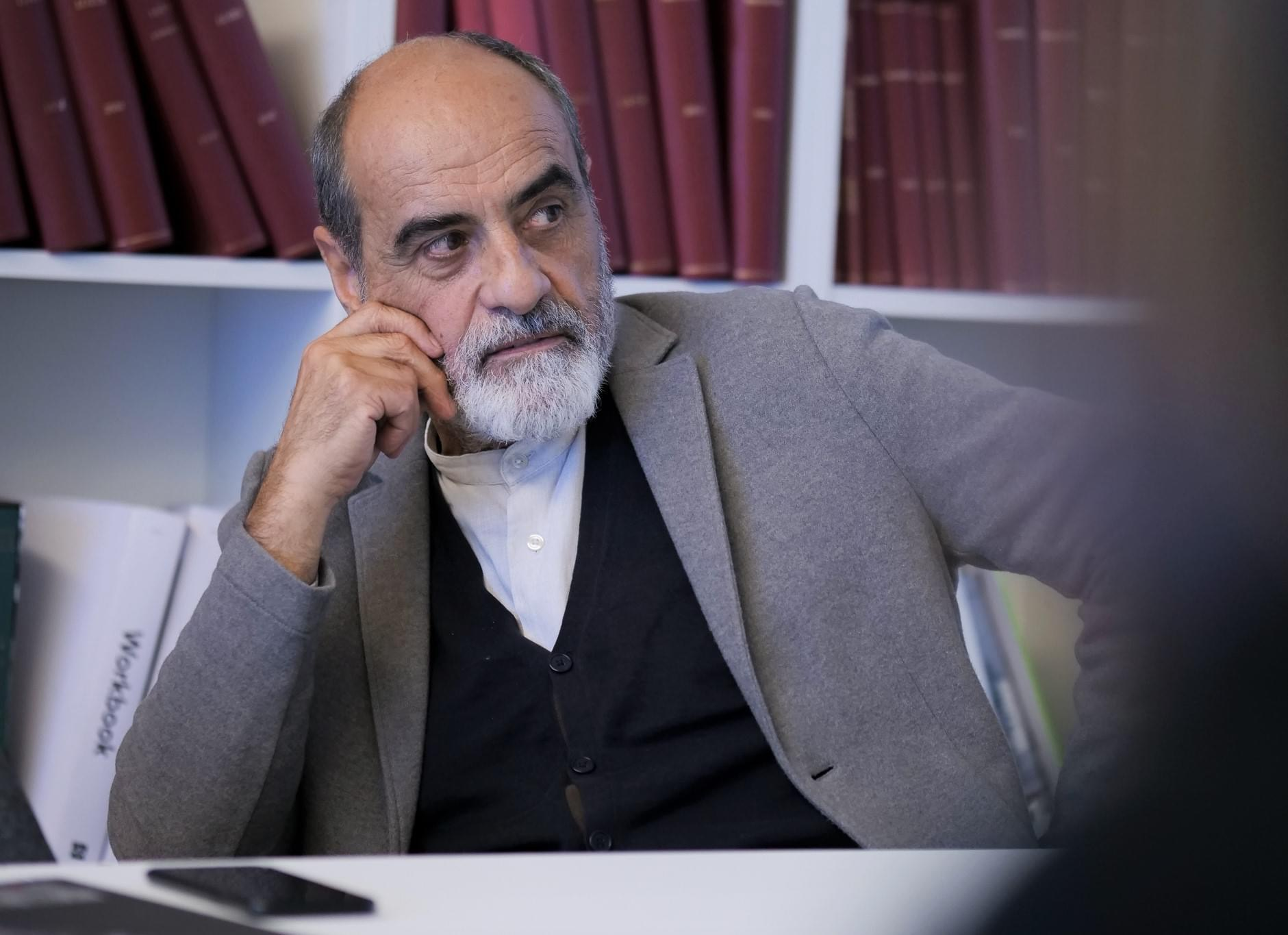
- Milesi in 2022
- Born: 19 November 1954 (age 71); Bergamo, Lombardy, Italy
- Occupation: Architect

Edoardo Milesi (born 19 November 1954) is an Italian architect.

== Life and career ==
Born in Bergamo in 1954, Edoardo Milesi obtained his secondary education at Lussana Scientific High School in Bergamo before enrolling in the Faculty of Architecture at IUAV University of Venice. Influenced by the ideas of Alvar Aalto and the works of Carlo Scarpa, he developed an architectural vision centered on human well-being, emphasizing a holistic approach to living that combines aesthetics, functionality, and environmental respect. He later transferred to the Polytechnic University of Milan, where he graduated in 1979 under the mentorship of Franca Helg.

After graduation, Milesi established his first studio, "SE", at Via Longo 1 in Bergamo. Throughout the 1980s, he was active in the Bergamo area, designing several residences that reflect the legacies of the Modern Movement. In 1990, he began a decade-long collaboration with Olivetti Servizi Italia, designing automated credit branches in the provinces of Bergamo and Brescia. Following this collaboration, he founded the architectural and engineering firm "Edoardo Milesi & Archos".

Milesi expanded his operations to Tuscany, starting with the renovation of castles of Vicarello and Colle Massari in the province of Grosseto. During this period, notable projects included the Monastery of Siloe, recognized as a contemporary architectural asset by the Superintendence of Monuments of Siena and Grosseto, and the Collemassari Winery. The winery was featured at the London Festival of Architecture in 2008, the 12th and 14th Venice Biennale in 2010 and 2012, and the 24th UIA World Congress of Architecture in Tokyo. It was named "Winery of the Year" by Gambero Rosso's Vini d'Italia guide in 2014. Milesi also designed the Fondazione Bertarelli Concert Hall. He relocated the Archos studio from central Bergamo to Fiobbio, a hamlet of Albino, and founded the art and culture magazine ArtApp in 2008, serving as its editorial director.

Following the 2010 Haiti earthquake, Milesi was commissioned by the Company of Mary and Caritas to build an earthquake-resistant construction school in Port-au-Prince through assisted self-construction with the local population. The wooden building, named after Pope John XXIII, won the first prize for Urban Innovation and Quality (IQU) in 2015 and was featured at the XXV UIA World Congress of Architecture in 2014 in Durban. In the same year, he designed two prototypes of earthquake-resistant villages in Port-au-Prince, composed of small wooden houses built by the first students of the technical school.

In 2014, Milesi established the Scuola Permanente dell'Abitare, an organization dedicated to training and research in architecture, design, and art. Concurrently, he led the restoration of the former convent of Sant'Agostino in Montalcino, where he later established the laboratory Officina Creativa dell'Abitare (OCRA). On 24 April 2019, the Ministry of the Interior appointed him to the board of directors of the Fabbriceria del Duomo di Siena, a position he held until the end of his term in April 2022. He is an active member of the Academy of Sciences, Letters, and Arts of Bergamo, a member of the scientific committee of the Italian Coastal Landscapes Observatory of Legambiente, and president of the cultural committee of the Bertarelli Foundation. Since 2021, he has been a member of the jury for Europan 16 Competition Italia.

In 2020, the "Roccolo Abitato" project in Clusone won the German Design Award in the Excellent Architecture category. In 2021, Edoardo Milesi & Archos secured three awards at the A' Design Award and Competition: a Golden Award for the Bertarelli Concert Hall and two Silver Awards for the "Roccolo Abitato" in Clusone and the "Villa in Collina" in Ponteranica. His project for the Cupano Winery in Montalcino earned an honorable mention at the In/Architettura 2023 awards for Tuscany, organized by the Italian National Institute of Architecture, for the "ability to reinterpret traditional typological features and compositional elements in a contemporary key, in harmony with their location".

== Works (selection) ==
- Multifunctional center of the nomad camp of Gjirokastër, Albania (1988–1989)
- Banca di Credito Cooperativo Bergamo e Valli headquarters, Pradalunga, Italy (1994)
- CLUBI Library, Clusone, Italy (1996–1999)
- "Michelangelo Buonarroti" Middle School, Cinigiano, Italy (1999–2000)
- Collemassari Winery, Poggi del Sasso, Cinigiano, Italy (2003–2005)
- Monastery of Siloe, Poggi del Sasso, Cinigiano, Italy (2001–2025)
- Museum of Blessed Pierina Morosini, Fiobbio, Albino, Italy (2007)
- Museum of Saint Geltrude Comensoli, Bergamo, Italy (2011)
- Poggio Bello Winery, Foiano della Chiana, Italy (2011)
- Fondazione Bertarelli Concert Hall, Poggi del Sasso, Cinigiano, Italy (2012–2015)
- Technical School Pope John XXIII, Port-au-Prince, Haiti (2012–2015)
- Inhabited Roccolo, Clusone, Italy (2016–2018)
- Cupano Winery, Montalcino, Italy (2019–2021)
- House of Memory for the Future (Casa della Memoria al Futuro), Maiano Lavacchio, Magliano in Toscana, Italy (2021–2023)

== General references ==
- Cristina Bergo; Cristina Fiordimela; Ermes Invernizzi (2015). Tredici complessi monastici. 1953-2013. Florence: Edifir. pp. 135–40.
- Barbara Catalani; Marco Del Francia; Giovanni Tombari (2011). Itinerari di architettura contemporanea. Grosseto e provincia. Pisa: ETS. pp. 63–4.
- Marco Del Francia; Barbara Catalani (2008). Architettura contemporanea nel paesaggio toscano. Florence: Edifir. pp. 54–63.
- Marco Del Francia; Carlo Pozzi; Leonardo Servadio (2010). Edoardo Milesi. Architettura sensibile. Bergamo: Archos.
- Gianluca Minguzzi (2006). Architettura sostenibile. Processo costruttivo e criteri biocompatibili. Milan: Skira. pp. 114–7, 177.
- Luca Molinari; Alessandro d'Onofrio (2008). Sustainab.Italy. Contemporary Ecologies, Energies for Italian Architecture. Rome: Gangemi. pp. 106–7.
- Luca Molinari, ed. (2017). Cantine da collezione. Itinerari di architettura contemporanea nel paesaggio italiano. Florence: Forma. pp. 172–9.
- Marco Mulazzani (2015). Forum Fondazione Bertarelli. Sala da concerti nella Maremma Toscana. Milan: Mondadori Electa.
- Francesca Perani, ed. (2005). Edoardo Milesi, 234 fotografie di 27 lavori. Milan: Idea Books.
- Luigi Prestinenza Puglisi (2009). ItaliArchitettura 2. Milan: UTET. pp. 198–207.
- Massimo Rossetti (2011). Cantine: tecnologia, architettura sostenibilità. Rimini: Maggioli. pp. 162–9.
- Cayetano Cardelùs Vidal (2024). Back to Nature. Architecture blends into landscape. Barcelona: Loft. pp. 42–51.
