= Fondazione Bertarelli Concert Hall =

Auditorium in Cinigiano, Italy

- Forum Fondazione Bertarelli
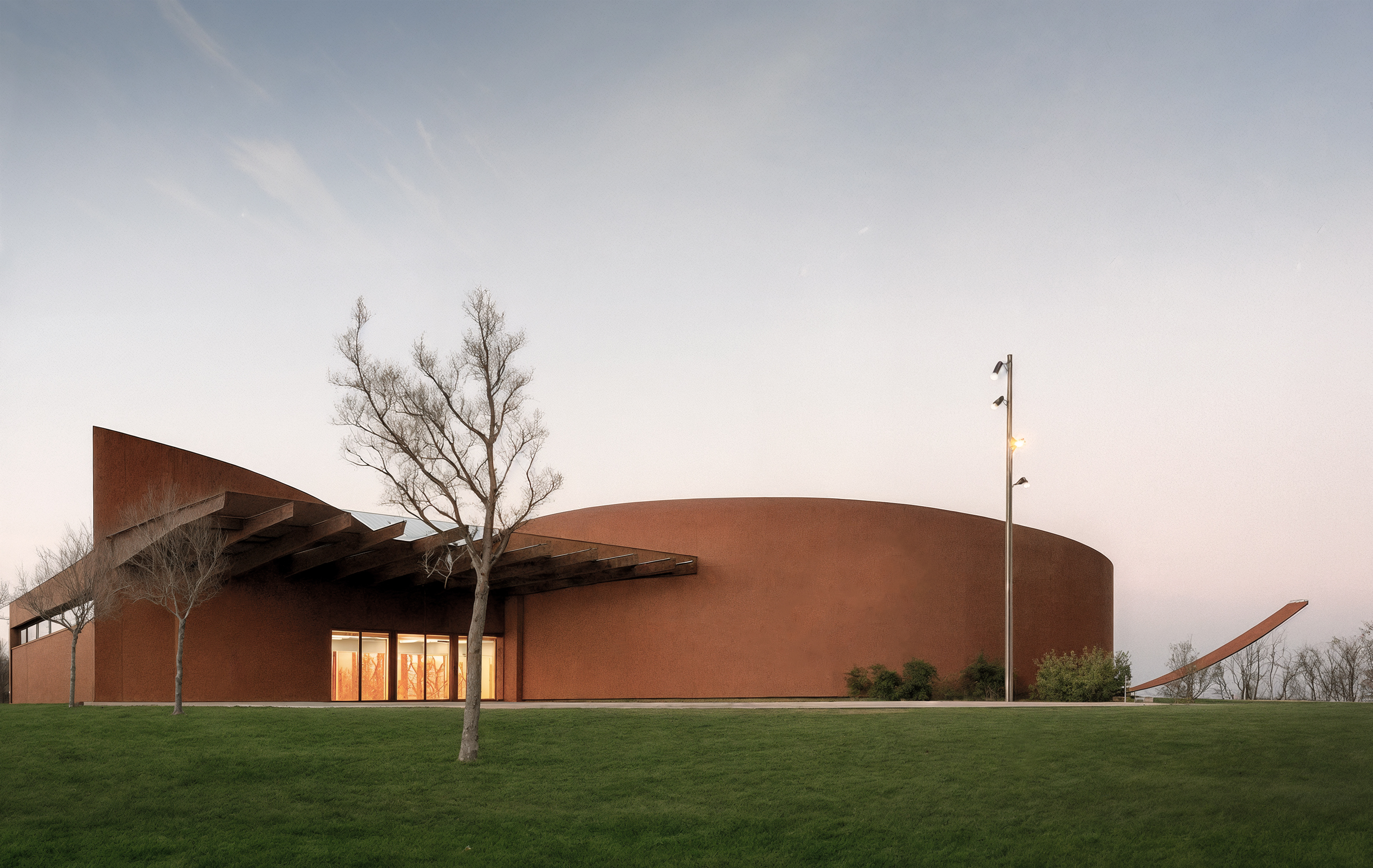
- Interactive map of Fondazione Bertarelli Concert Hall
- Location: Strada Provinciale 114; Poggi del Sasso, Cinigiano, Tuscany, Italy
- Coordinates: 42°52′26.43″N 11°19′37.7″E
- Owner: Bertarelli Foundation
- Capacity: 300
- Type: Auditorium

Construction
- Built: 2013–2015
- Opened: 19 June 2015; 11 years ago
- Architect: Edoardo Milesi
- Builder: Edilmario
- Structural engineer: Marco Verdina

Website
- Official website

The Fondazione Bertarelli Concert Hall (Forum Fondazione Bertarelli) is a contemporary-style auditorium located in Poggi del Sasso, in the municipality of Cinigiano, province of Grosseto, Tuscany. It hosts chamber music concerts and theatrical performances and is considered an exemplary achievement in the fields of bio-architecture and energy efficiency in buildings. It was designed by architect Edoardo Milesi.

Since 2015, it has been the permanent venue for the international classical music festival Amiata Piano Festival.

== History ==
The project involved constructing a 300-seat concert hall in a remote inland area of Maremma. The Bertarelli Foundation aimed to replace a proposed residential development with a cultural building of equal volume and cost.

Originally, in 2010, architect Edoardo Milesi proposed a structure clad in local stone, featuring a concert hall, dressing rooms, rehearsal spaces, and a restaurant with panoramic views. In 2012, the design was revised: the restaurant was removed, and a foyer and outdoor patio were added. The updated design incorporated modern materials such as colored concrete, Corten steel, and glass, utilizing a mixed construction system. Construction began in 2013 and was completed in approximately 16 months, with an initial acoustic test conducted in 2014. The official opening took place on 19 June 2015.

In 2017, the project won the AESS Sustainability Award, and in the same year, it received a mention from the jury of the Dedalo Minosse Prize for architecture commissioning. In 2021, it won the Golden A' Design Award in the category of architecture, building, and structure design.

== Description ==
The building consists of a single structure divided into two parts: the concert hall and the foyer, which has a rectangular layout. The complex covers an area of 2,086 square meters and is situated on the top of a hill cultivated with olive trees near Poggi del Sasso, in the Maremma countryside. The structure is completed by dressing rooms located in the basement, beside the hall, with direct access to the stage, and by a large outdoor patio overlooking the surrounding hills and the Colle Massari castle.

The hall is equipped with two independent ventilation systems: one mechanical for air conditioning and one natural. The mechanical system, which operates silently to avoid generating noise inside the hall, distributes warm or cold air depending on the season through diffusers placed beneath each individual seat in the auditorium. The natural air exchange is instead achieved through passive energy exploitation: an open-air intake system on the exterior facing north captures the wind and channels it inside toward the lower part of the hall. Simultaneously, a small opening at the top, opposite the distribution grilles, activates the Venturi effect, which, due to the pressure difference generated, can induce natural air exchange within a few minutes.

From an acoustic perspective, the concert hall was designed so that sound is amplified without the use of mechanical devices. The oval shape of the drum on which the roof rests, along with the two side wings wrapping around the audience, and especially the unique ceiling design—which acts as a resonant chamber—contribute to ensuring that each of the 300 spectators receives the same amount of sound waves without echoes or disturbances. Additionally, the stage floor sits above a hollow space, creating an air chamber that enhances acoustics.

The exterior of the building features an organic design, characterized by a closed form without visible openings from the outside, reminiscent of a tumulus clad in earth-colored concrete and protected by a Corten steel oxidized slab. The structure includes a foyer with Corten steel walls and a large glass wall, an outdoor patio paved with travertine and covered by a steel and glass canopy. An iron element inspired by Richard Serra creates a passage that conceals the view of the surrounding countryside, leading inside to a bright foyer and an underground theater. The concert hall has an oval shape, with an ellipsoidal dome roof clad in zinc-titanium and tiered seating upholstered in cherry wood, designed for optimal acoustics. The interior features a ceiling made of cherry and fir wood, engineered to enhance sound diffusion, and various flooring types: cherry and fir wood in the hall, travertine in the foyer, and ceramic tiles in the technical areas.

== Sources ==
- Giovanni Gazzaneo, ed. (2016). Edoardo Milesi. Opere toscane 1996-2016. Bergamo: Archos.
- Maretto, Marco (2017). "Forum Fondazione Bertarelli a Cinigiano, Grosseto". L'Industria delle costruzioni. No. 454. pp. 50–57.
- Mulazzani, Marco (2015). Forum Fondazione Bertarelli. Sala da concerti nella Maremma toscana. Milan: Electa.
