= Monastery of Siloe =

- Monastery of the Incarnation of the Community of Siloe
- Monastero dell'Incarnazione della Comunità di Siloe (Italian)
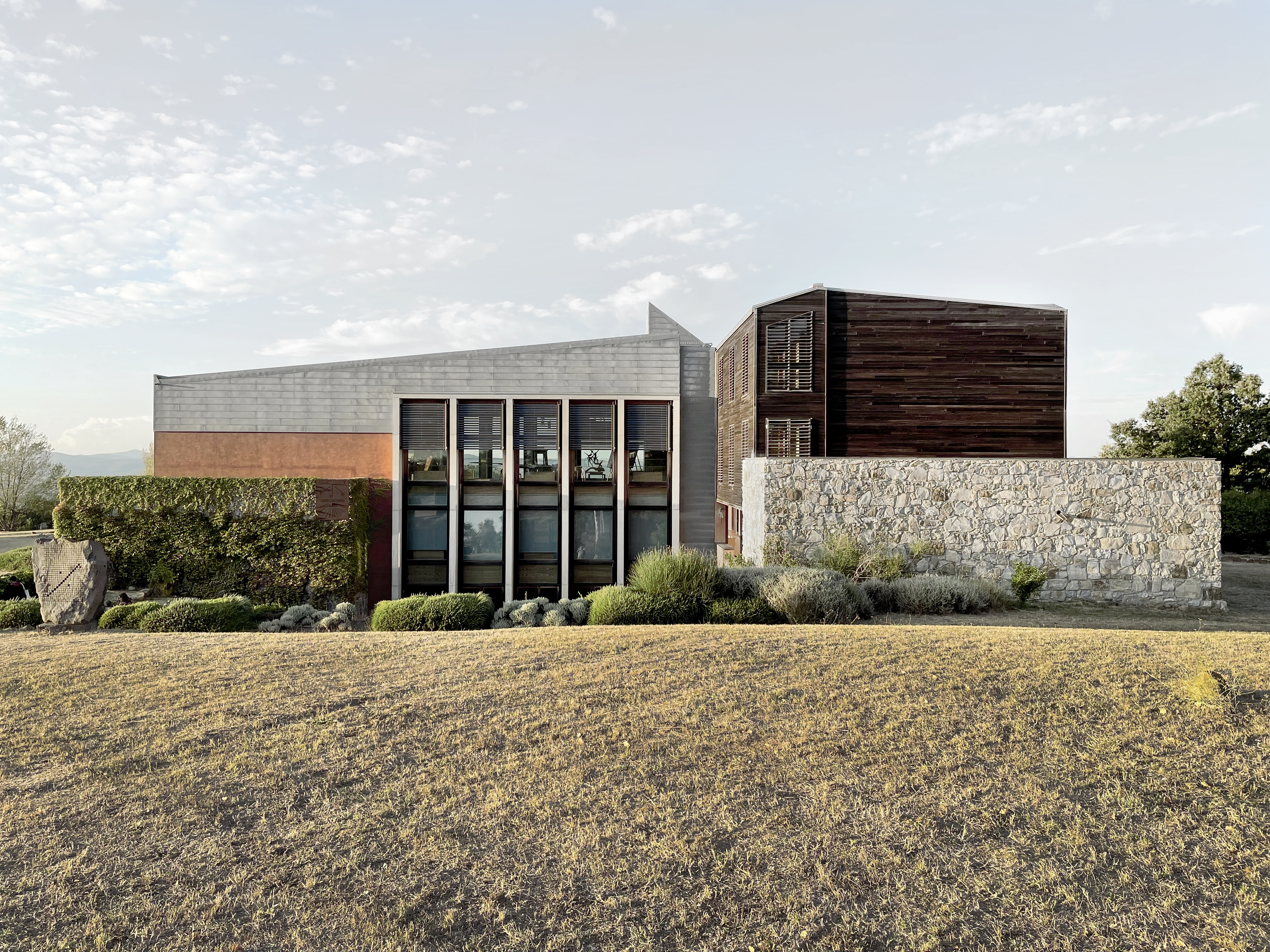
- Monastery of Siloe
- 42°55′07.45″N 11°19′13.22″E
- Location: Case Tribolone, Poggi del Sasso, Cinigiano, Tuscany
- Country: Italy
- Denomination: Roman Catholic

History
- Consecrated: 8 September 2001; 24 years ago

Architecture
- Architect: Edoardo Milesi
- Architectural type: Monastery
- Style: Contemporary
- Groundbreaking: 2001
- Completed: 2025

The monastery of the Incarnation of the Community of Siloe, simply known as monastery of Siloe, is an Italian religious building from the 21st century, home to the monastic community of Siloe. It is located near the village of Poggi del Sasso, in the municipality of Cinigiano, in the province of Grosseto, Tuscany.

The monastery complex, whose design is inspired by Cistercian architecture, is considered a valuable contemporary example of green religious architecture. It is the first and only monastery built in Italy in the 21st century.

== History ==
In 1996, a group of Benedictine monks, who had arrived in Maremma from various locations in central-northern Italy, decided to found a new monastic community. On 16 December 1997, the bishop of Grosseto, Giacomo Babini, officially recognized the community as a "public association of the faithful" living according to the rule of saint Benedict, although not formally belonging to the Benedictine order.

In the diocese of Grosseto there were no active monasteries nor ancient ones to restore, so, in agreement with the bishop, the community decided to build an entirely new structure on a hill overlooking the Ombrone valley. This site, used for sheep grazing, was called "Le Piscine" ("the Pools"), from which comes the name "Siloe", like the pool where Jesus sends the blind man to be healed in the Gospel of John.

The construction of the monastic complex, designed by Edoardo Milesi, began with inspections at the end of 1999, initiating the transformation of an old sheep pen into a chapel dedicated to the Holy Trinity, consecrated by bishop Babini on 8 September 2001. The east wing of the monastery, housing monks' cells, kitchen, and refectory, was inaugurated on 26 June 2005, by bishop Franco Agostinelli.

The first stone of the south wing was laid on 19 May 2007, and completed in 2012. It includes facilities for community functions and hospitality, such as a library, conference room, guest areas, and outdoor square.

On 11 July 2021, during the monks' 25th anniversary, the blessing ceremony and laying of the foundation stone of the new church of the monastery took place. The ceremony was presided over by Rodolfo Cetoloni, bishop emeritus of Grosseto. The construction works were completed in late 2025, and the dedication of the church took place on 7 December 2025.

== Description ==
The design of the monastic building was entrusted in 1999 to the architect Edoardo Milesi from Bergamo. The project is inspired by 12th-century Cistercian architecture—for example, in the quadrangular plan, the cloister facing the lower chapter room reminiscent of a baptismal font, and the orientation of the church favoring sunlight exposure—but integrates contemporary forms and bioarchitecture techniques and materials (local stone, wood, copper, and iron).

The monastery stretches over a surface area of 38,000 m^{2}. The building is structured around a square layout with sides of about 40 meters, internally dividing areas for worship, hospitality services, and the residence of the monastic community. At the center is a square-plan cloister of 14 meters, onto which the south, east, and west wings open, while the church building occupies the north side. The complex is completed by the Chapel of the Holy Trinity, the Chapel of Light, and the Hermitage of the Saints.

Inside the monastic area, there are painted and sculptural works by contemporary artists such as André Beuchat, Mario Caffaro Rore, Piero Casentini, Nino Giammarco, Giuseppe Lafavia, Rodolfo Lacquaniti, Cesare Lucarini, Umberto Mastroianni, Arnaldo Mazzanti, Nino Mezzaro, Gianriccardo Piccoli, Pinuccio Sciola, Rino Sgavetta, Alessio Tasca, Alberto Timossi, and Silvio Tironi.

=== Main complex ===
The east wing of the monastery, dedicated strictly to monastic life, was the first part of the entire complex to be built and was completed in 2005. The exterior perimeter walls are mostly of exposed local stone, while the wooden parts—both window frames and façade coverings—are left natural. The square plan, centered on a large inner courtyard, allows for a distribution of spaces organized around community life. The compactness and linearity of the monastery are balanced by discontinuous lines, also shaped by the unevenness of the terrain. This first block, located to the east, the tallest and most imposing, contains the monks' residences and, on the ground floor, the chapter room, refectory, and kitchen, in a continuous play of light penetrating through angled windows and overhead openings.

The south wing is arranged over four levels and closes off the southern side of the monastery's central cloister, while on the opposite side it opens onto a large square carved into the natural shape of the terrain, with seating for 450 people. The façades are characterized by reinforced concrete walls with window frames. These walls filter direct sunlight and visually separate the public function from the internal cloister. The single-pitch sloping roof is made of titanium alloy panels, integrated with photovoltaic panels. The entrance is marked by a wooden walkway hidden behind a tall wall clad in local stone. Inside, there is a reception area and multipurpose room on the ground floor; a double-height library and reading room with mezzanine on the first floor; and a 140-seat conference hall in the basement for events organized by the San Benedetto Cultural Center.

The west wing creates a direct link between the south wing and the church, facilitating movement between the different areas to ensure spatial continuity among the spaces for prayer, services, and learning. Inside, the pastoral rooms are intended to host catechesis and gatherings. The west wing completes the overall structure of the monastery around the cloister, creating unity between the monastic facilities and the areas devoted to monastic life.

=== Church of the Holy Spirit ===
The church is dedicated to the Holy Spirit (Spirito Santo) and serves as a subsidiary to the parish church of St. Margaret in Poggi del Sasso. It was conceived as a sail-shaped building, with a double row of wooden columns supporting the sloped roof, designed to evoke the image of it rising toward the sky. The roof is intended to resemble a forest canopy, through which sunlight filters. Construction began in 2021 and was completed in 2025.

=== Other buildings ===
==== Chapel of the Holy Trinity ====
The chapel of the Holy Trinity (Cappella della Santissima Trinità), also known as the Pilgrim's chapel, was created by transforming an old stone sheep pen located on the ridge of the hill overlooking the Ombrone valley, and it was consecrated in 2001. The building was renovated without altering the original layout, using wood and stone, to which the presbytery was added. The bell tower consists of a light structure made of rough wooden slats, while the church façade features an iron door, a porch, and a vestibule.

Inside, the chapel has a simple single-nave layout and preserves an altar made from a squared monolith taken from Mount Amiata.

==== Chapel of Light ====
Consecrated on 9 May 2004, by bishop Babini, the chapel of Light (Cappella della Luce) is a small structure buried on three sides, located in an olive field beside the monastery. The entrance, made of glass, is framed by two walls of local stone, while the interior walls are lined with golden stone from nearby Mount Amiata. Inside the chapel is a statue of Our Lady of Fátima, illuminated by natural overhead light that filters through a hollow stone embedded in the concrete roof slab.

==== Hermitage of the Saints ====
The hermitage of the Saints (Eremo dei Santi) consists of four residential units used as guest quarters, fully integrated with the monastery's structure. Inaugurated in 2017, each unit includes a room with bathroom, a north-facing balcony, and a south-facing loggia. The structural frame and infill walls are made of wood and use recyclable natural materials.

To optimize land use and because there are no facing views or light conflicts between the buildings, they were constructed at a minimum distance of 5 meters from each other, designed as parts of a single architectural entity.

== Sources ==
- Cristina Bergo; Cristina Fiordimela; Ermes Invernizzi (2015). Tredici complessi monastici. 1953-2013. Florence: Edifir.
- Cristian Carrara; Giulia Anna Milesi (2021). Edoardo Milesi. Abitare il legno. Bergamo: Archos. pp. 121–129.
- Barbara Catalani; Marco Del Francia (2008). Architettura contemporanea nel paesaggio toscano. Florence: Edifir. pp. 55–58.
- Barbara Catalani; Marco Del Francia; Giovanni Tombari (2011). Itinerari di architettura contemporanea. Grosseto e provincia. Pisa: ETS.
- Marco Del Francia; Leonardo Servadio (2010). Edoardo Milesi. Architettura sensibile. Bergamo: Archos. pp. 100–117.
- Antonio Fuccillo (2018). Diritto, religioni, culture. Il fattore religioso nell'esperienza giuridica. Turin: Giappichelli.
- Chiara Giacobelli (2013). 1001 monasteri e santuari in Italia da visitare almeno una volta nella vita. Rome: Newton Compton.
