= Cymo =

Cymo may refer to:

- Cymo (crab), a genus of crabs
- Moosonee Airport, the ICAO airport code
- Cymo (mythology), one of the Nereids
- Cymo Island, Western Australia
