= Cymo melanodactylus =

Scientific classification
- Kingdom: Animalia
- Phylum: Arthropoda
- Clade: Pancrustacea
- Class: Malacostraca
- Order: Decapoda
- Suborder: Pleocyemata
- Infraorder: Brachyura
- Family: Xanthidae
- Genus: Cymo
- Species: C. melanodactylus

Binomial name
- Cymo melanodactylus Dana, 1852

Synonyms
- Cancer (Cymo) meladactylus De Haan, 1833; Cancer (Cymo) meladactylus Herklots, 1861; Cymo melanodactylus saviiensis Ward, 1939

Species of crab

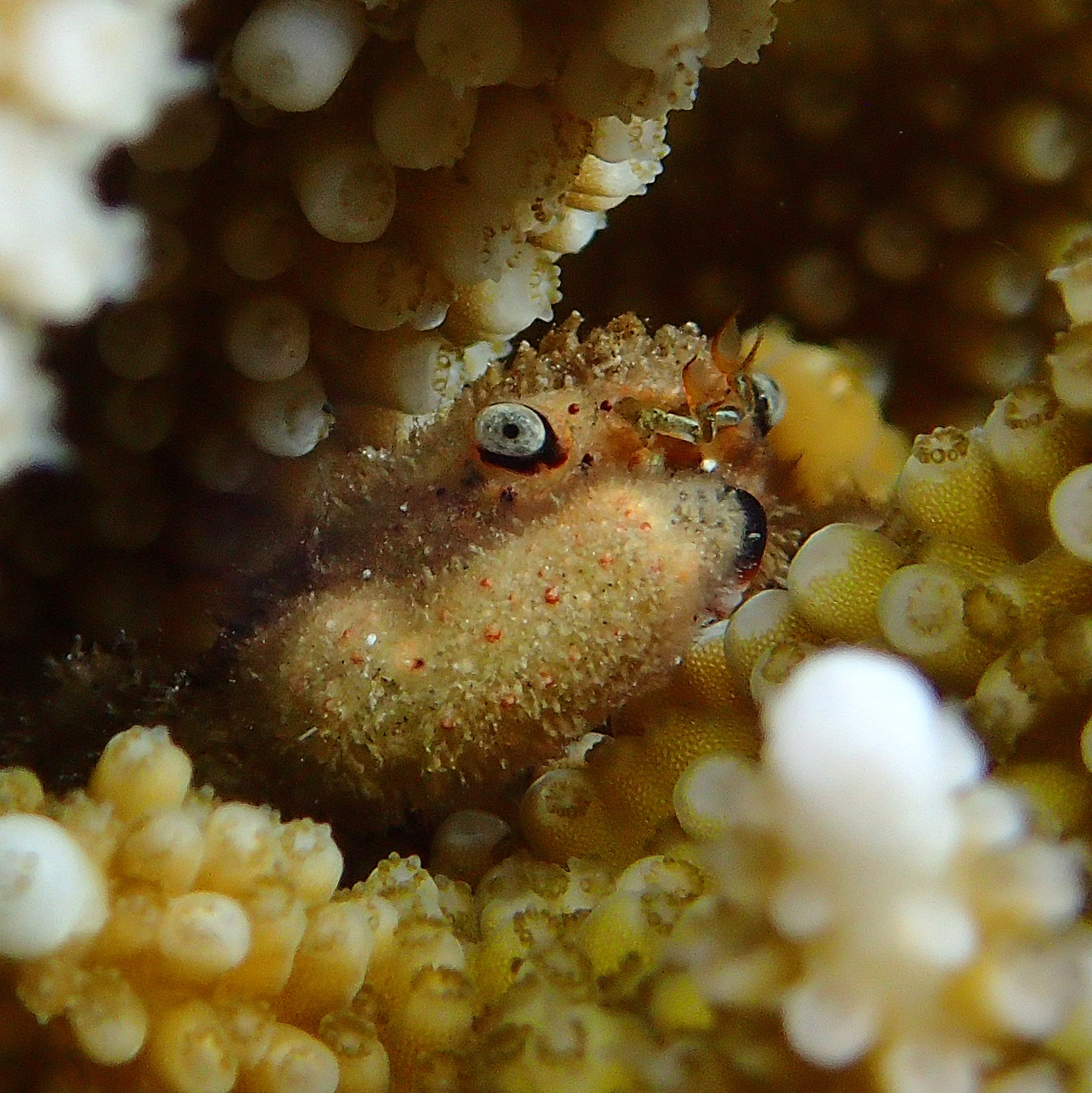
Cymo melanodactylus

Cymo melanodactylus, also known as the furry coral crab, is a species of small crab in the family Xanthidae. It is found in the Indo-Pacific Ocean and lives in crevices and on the surface of corals in the genus Acropora.

== Description ==
The carapace and limbs of Cymo melanodactylus have the appearance of being covered with short fur. It has large pale blue, stalked eyes, a spiny carapace with a shallow groove down the middle and grows to about 1.3 cm (0.5 in) wide. It typically has black fingers to its claws but is difficult to distinguish from the rather similar Cymo andreossyi on claw colour alone as some individuals have white finger tips and others have white fingers with black bases. A more reliable feature to distinguish between the two is the orange granulations on the carapace of Cymo melanodactylus.

== Distribution ==
Cymo melanodactylus is found in the Indo-Pacific Ocean. Its range extends from the Red Sea and Madagascar to New Caledonia, French Polynesia and Wallis and Futuna.

== Biology ==
Cymo melanodactylus is an obligate commensal of Acropora spp. corals. On the large table coral Acropora cytherea, there are usually just one or two of these crabs per head of coral. The crabs feed mostly on mucus secreted by the coral, but also consume zooplankton and suspended particles and nibble the living tissue, though the coral seems little harmed by this. In 2010 in the Chagos Archipelago, infestations of as many as 47 of these crabs were found on individual heads of coral and these corals exhibited dead and dying tissue. The crabs were near the damaged tissues but it was unclear whether the crabs were the original cause of the damage or whether they had moved in to exploit the already dying tissues. A more recent study has shown that Cymo melanodactylus is attracted to acroporid corals suffering from white band disease and that the disease advances at a much slower rate when the crabs are present than it does when they are absent.

In the Seychelles, this crab was found living on a different species of coral, Acropora formosa. A single coral head supported a mated pair, a single female and some juveniles.
