= Bertarelli Foundation =

Private Swiss charitable foundation

- Type: private foundation
- Industry: Marine conservation and science, Health and life science
- Founded: 1998
- Headquarters: Gstaad, Switzerland
- Key people: Ernesto Bertarelli, Dona Bertarelli, Maria Iris
- Website: https://www.fondation-bertarelli.org

The Bertarelli Foundation is a private foundation founded by the Bertarelli family; brother and sister Ernesto and Dona Bertarelli, who are co-Chairs of the Foundation, and their mother, Maria Iris Bertarelli. It was established in 1998 in memory of Fabio Bertarelli and is based in Gstaad, Switzerland. For ten years, the Bertarelli Foundation focused on promoting an understanding of infertility, especially multiple gestations. This reflected the work of the family’s business, Ares-Serono, in the field, including its development of influential infertility treatment Pergonal. Following the sale of Serono, the Bertarelli Foundation refocused its activities onto the fields of marine conservation and neuroscience research, as well as projects in their local communities. The Foundation has a sister organisation in Italy, the Fondazione Bertarelli, which promotes cultural activities in Tuscany, where the family’s Collemassari wine estate is located.

== Activities ==
=== Marine conservation ===
The Bertarelli Foundation is active in the creation of Marine Protected Areas (MPAs), both in terms of providing material support and in terms of advocacy. In 2010 it worked with the British Government to provide the financial backing to enable the designation of the Chagos Marine Protected Area in the British Indian Ocean Territory.

In 2012, the Foundation provided the funding and practical support to advance the designation of a marine reserve centred on the Turneffe Atoll in Belize, which is part of the largest and most biodiverse coral reef system in the western hemisphere.

In 2015, it again partnered with the British Government and also with the Pew Charitable Trusts for the creation of a marine reserve around the Pitcairn Islands. In 2017, a 740,000 km² MPA was created off the coast of Easter Island. The Bertarelli Foundation, in partnership with Pew Charitable Trusts, supported the campaign for the MPA’s creation as part of a developing partnership which has now become the Pew Bertarelli Ocean Legacy Project, and is led by Dona Bertarelli. The Pew Bertarelli project was also involved in the campaign to create the Revillagigedo Archipelago National Park which was announced by Mexico President Enrique Peña Nieto in November 2017. The Foundation and Pew are also advocating for the creation of a marine park around the South Sandwich Islands on the edge of the Antarctic.

As well as its work to create and advocate for the creation of marine protected areas, the foundation established the Bertarelli Programme in Marine Science in 2017, partnering with universities from around the world to advance ocean science in the Indian Ocean. Several expeditions to the territory have already taken place, with reports published on the British Government’s BIOT website.

=== Neuroscience research ===
In 2010, the Bertarelli Foundation entered into a partnership with Harvard Medical School and the Ecole Polytechnique Fédérale de Lausanne (EPFL) to a joint neuroengineering programme, the Bertarelli Program in Translational Neuroscience and Neuroengineering. The aim of the programme is to foster collaboration in neuroscience between the two institutions. The partnership also endowed a Bertarelli Chair at Harvard Medical School and there is an annual symposium held at which findings from the programme are discussed. In 2014, the partnership was renewed, with funding of $3.6m provided to five projects of three-year duration between scientists at Harvard Medical School and bioengineers at EPFL. Three of these projects focus on new methods to diagnose and treat deafness; the fourth on cell transplantation strategies to reverse blindness; and the fifth on dealing with difficulties in diagnosing children with autism. The programme also sponsors an exchange programme for students at the two institutions. In 2018, the Bertarelli Foundation donated $6.35m to Harvard Medical School for research in sensory disorders.

The foundation also sponsors four chairs at EPFL’s Center for Neuroprosthetics, which is now located at Campus Biotech in Geneva, the former Serono headquarters bought back by a consortium led by Ernesto Bertarelli to be a life sciences hub for the region. They are Professor Olaf Blanke, Professor Stéphanie P. Lacour, Professor Mackenzie Weygandt Mathis and Professor Silvestro Micera.

In 2017, the Bertarelli Foundation gave a further 10 million Swiss francs to EPFL to further develop research into neurological disorders. Half of the donation will fund a new gene therapy platform at Campus Biotech in Geneva; the other half will create a new catalyst fund to further collaboration at the same institution.

=== Other activities ===
In 2008 the Bertarelli Foundation funded a new classroom and a medical centre at Henna Pre-School in South Africa having visited the school during a family holiday.

In 2014, it partnered with Harvard Business School to establish the Bertarelli Foundation Health & Life Sciences Entrepreneurship Fund. A separate gift of $3 million created the Bertarelli Catalyst Fund for the Dean of HMS. As part of the funding, a Bertarelli Prize is awarded to a winning team from the Harvard i-Lab for those students “pursuing innovative solutions to improve healthcare and patients’ lives”.

In 2014, the Bertarelli Foundation donated $3 million to Babson College to create a new faculty chair, the Bertarelli Foundation Distinguished Professor of Family Entrepreneurship. In 2017, Babson named William B. Gartner to the post.

In Stoke-on-Trent, Kirsty Bertarelli, the former wife of Ernesto Bertarelli and a former trustee of the Bertarelli Foundation, has launched projects supporting YMCA North Staffordshire and the Stoke-on-Trent Literary Festival, which takes place annually at the Emma Bridgwater factory in the city and which was established by former MP for Stoke-on-Trent Central, Tristram Hunt.

== See also ==
- Fondazione Bertarelli Concert Hall
