= Collemassari Winery =

Winery designed by Edoardo Milesi in Cinigiano, Italy

Cantina di Collemassari
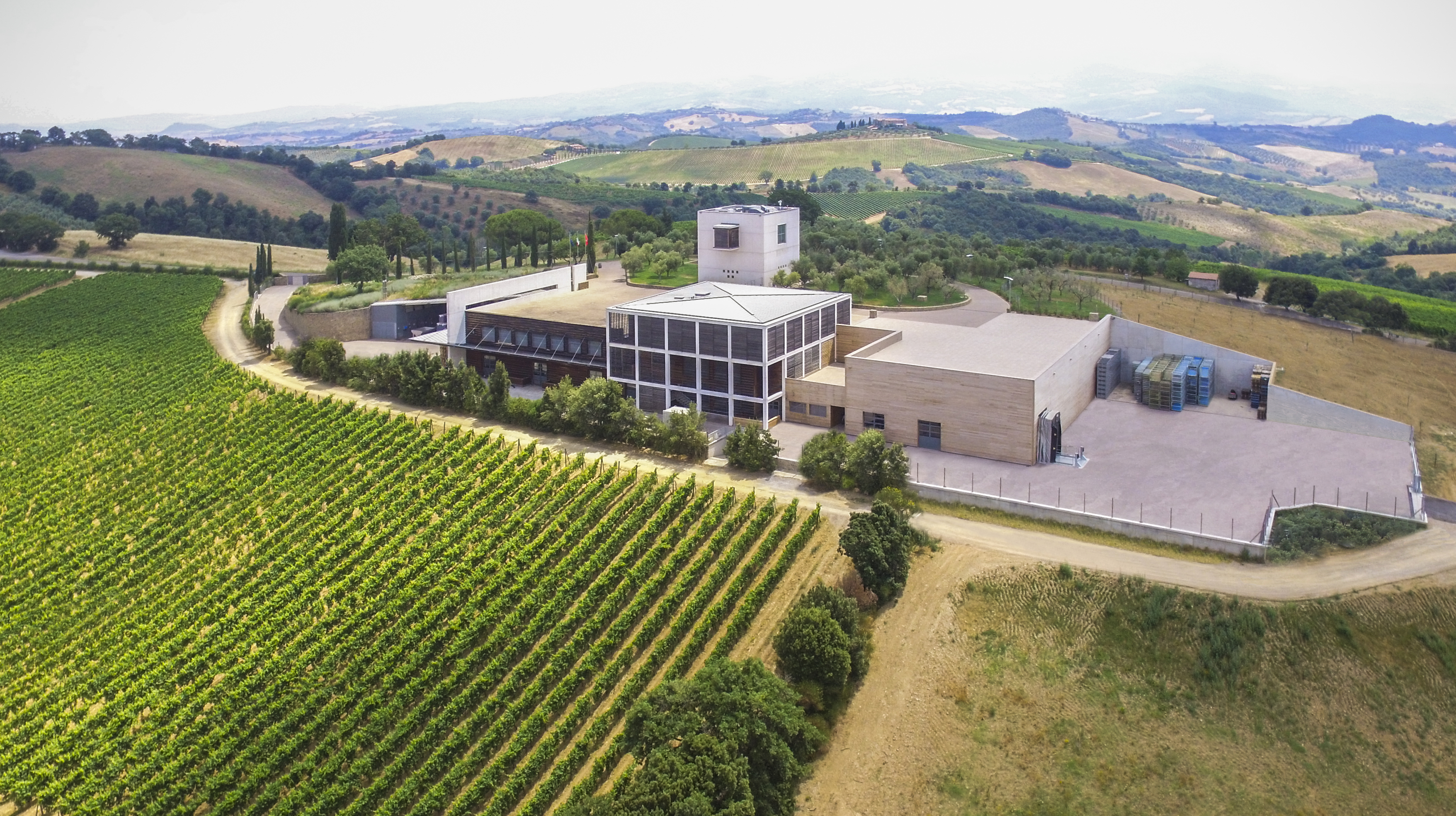
- Interactive map of the Cantina di Collemassari area

General information
- Type: Winery
- Location: Strada Provinciale 114 Poggi del Sasso; Cinigiano, Tuscany, Italy
- Coordinates: 42°53′16.2″N 11°19′42.73″E
- Construction started: 2003
- Completed: 2005

Design and construction
- Architect: Edoardo Milesi

Website
- Official website

The Collemassari Winery (Cantina di Collemassari) is a contemporary-style winery located in the municipality of Cinigiano, in the province of Grosseto, Tuscany. The structure, designed by Edoardo Milesi and home to the winemaking company with the same name, is part of the Toscana Wine Architecture circuit of design wineries as one of Italy's "cathedrals of wine". It is located on a hill in the surroundings of the castle of Colle Massari, not far from the village of Poggi del Sasso.

The winery is considered a valid example of sustainable architecture. In 2006, it won the 'Fassa Bortolo' International Prize for Sustainable Architecture, and in 2014, it was recognized as 'Winery of the Year' by the Gambero Rosso's Vini d'Italia guide. The winery's project was featured at the London Festival of Architecture in 2008, the 12th and 14th Venice Biennale in 2010 and 2012, and the 24th UIA World Congress of Architecture in Tokyo.

== Description ==
Built between 2003 and 2005, and designed by architect Edoardo Milesi, it consists of three volumes that interact with each other and with the context, and it was built following bio-architecture principles with an organization on multiple levels following the natural slopes of the countryside.

The winemaking area is a wooden box, buried for 2/3 of its volume, and covered by a light cage of pillars and beams in white concrete that rise from the vineyard and rest almost temporarily above the underground structure. All the annexed spaces are carved into the hillside; the only emerging elements are a white wall and the office building. The structure results from a design focused on energy saving, green building, and bioclimatic engineering, which influenced the choice of components and materials.

The architectural project addresses the climatic and environmental needs of production with systems that use natural elements such as air, light, wind, and water. These natural methods also help maintain the internal microclimate essential for the various stages of wine production, including recycling process water needed for field irrigation.

The natural climate control of the barrel room is achieved through ventilated ducts that can be opened at night to initiate air circulation, and once closed during the day, they ensure a thermally stable environment as required for wine aging. The cedar slats on the ceiling disinfect the air, preventing the proliferation of pests and molds harmful to the wooden barrels and the wine.

In 2019, the winery expanded with the addition of two new storage buildings on the southwest side. Also designed by architect Milesi, the new monolithic buildings are covered with ventilated facades made of cedar wood and zinc-titanium, two recurring materials in the overall winery project.

== Sources ==
- Barbara Catalani; Marco Del Francia; Giovanni Tombari (2011). Itinerari di architettura contemporanea. Grosseto e provincia. Pisa: ETS.
- Marco Del Francia; Barbara Catalani (2008). Architettura contemporanea nel paesaggio toscano. Florence: Edifir.
- Marco Del Francia; Carlo Pozzi; Leonardo Servadio (2010). Edoardo Milesi. Architettura sensibile. Bergamo: Archos.
- Francesca Chiorino (October 2007). "Cantina vinicola castello di Colle Massari. Vinificazione sostenibile" (PDF). Casabella (759). Milano: Mondadori.
- Francesca Chiorino (2011). Cantine secolo XXI. Architetture e paesaggi del vino. Milan: Electa.
- Edoardo Milesi (2021). Abitare il legno. Bergamo: Archos.
- Gianluca Minguzzi (2006). Architettura sostenibile. Processo costruttivo e criteri biocompatibili. Milan: Skira.
- Luca Molinari; Giovanni Bietti (2017). Cantine da collezione. Itinerari di architettura contemporanea nel paesaggio italiano. Florence: Forma.
- Luca Molinari; Alessandro d'Onofrio (2008). Sustainab.Italy. Contemporary Ecologies, Energies for Italian Architecture. Rome: Gangemi.
- Veronica Pirazzini (2008). Cantine. Milan: Motta Architettura.
- Massimo Rossetti (2011). Cantine: tecnologia, architettura sostenibilità. Rimini: Maggioli.
