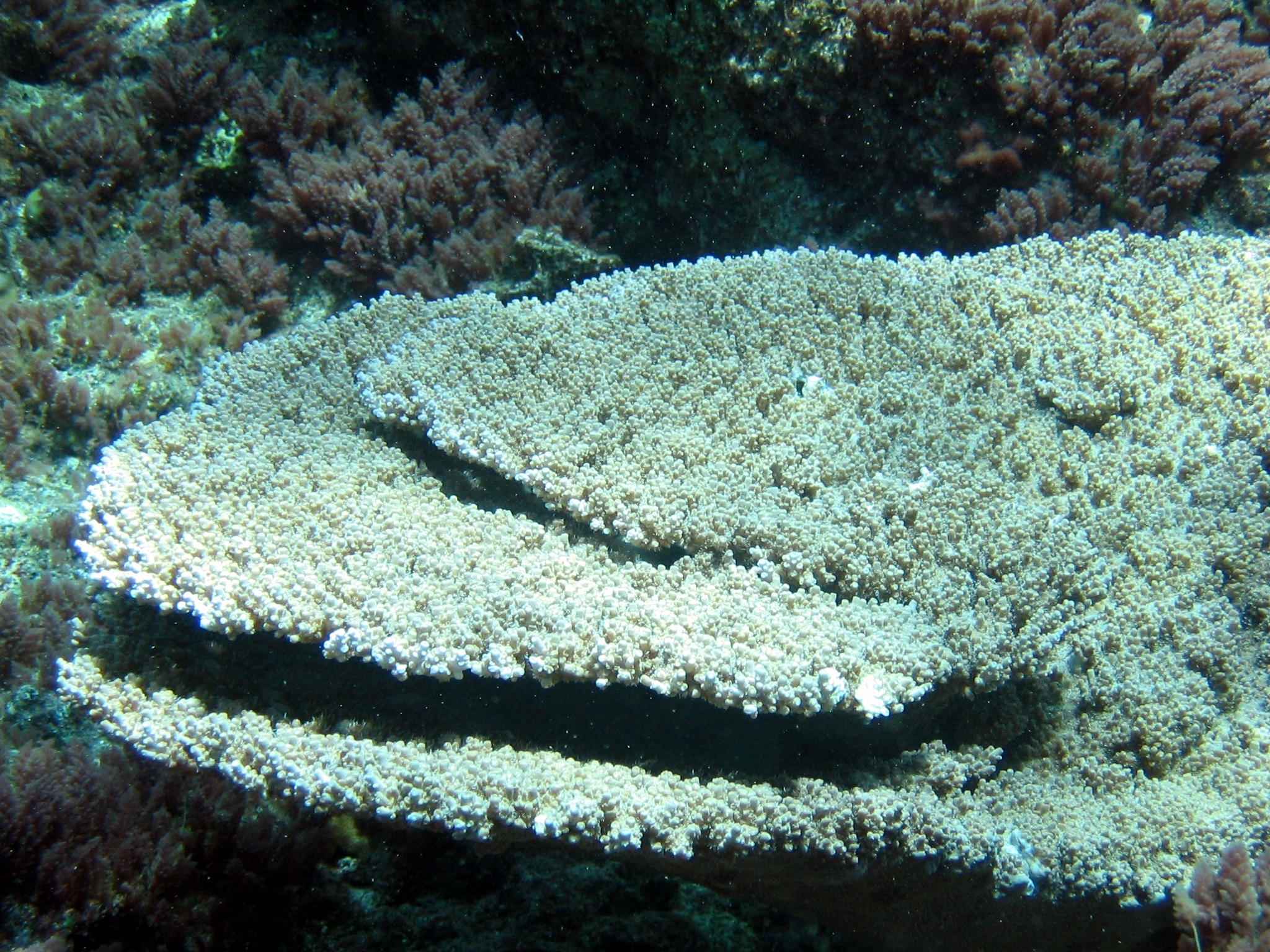

Conservation status
- Endangered (IUCN 3.1)

Scientific classification
- Kingdom: Animalia
- Phylum: Cnidaria
- Subphylum: Anthozoa
- Class: Hexacorallia
- Order: Scleractinia
- Family: Acroporidae
- Genus: Acropora
- Species: A. cytherea

Binomial name
- Acropora cytherea (Dana, 1846)

Synonyms
- List: Acropora arcuata (Brook, 1892); Acropora armata (Brook, 1892); Acropora corymbosa (Lamarck, 1816); Acropora cytherella Verrill, 1902; Acropora efflorescens (Dana, 1846); Acropora reticulata (Brook, 1892); Acropora symmetrica (Brook, 1891); Madrepora arcuata Brook, 1892; Madrepora armata Brook, 1892; Madrepora candelabrum Studer, 1877; Madrepora corymbosa Lamarck, 1816; Madrepora cytherea Dana, 1846; Madrepora efflorescens Dana, 1846; Madrepora reticulata Brook, 1892; Madrepora symettrica Brook, 1891

= Acropora cytherea =

Species of coral

Acropora cytherea is a stony coral which forms horizontal table like structures. It occurs in the Indo-Pacific Ocean in areas with little wave action, favouring back reef environments from 3 to 20 m (10 to 66 ft) depth.

== Description ==
Acropora cytherea is a colonial species of coral that grows in large horizontal plates. These are formed of many tiny branchlets growing vertically or at an angle and others growing horizontally to extend the colony. They may branch and link together and near the centre the plates may become a solid mass of joined branchlets. The surface of the coral is covered by a thin layer of living tissue. This has a rough surface and contains zooxanthella, symbiotic, unicellular, photosynthetic algae. These give the coral its cream or pale brown colour (occasionally pale blue). The calcium carbonate skeleton is secreted by many small polyps which are joined together through an interconnecting network of channels inside the skeleton. At night, and sometimes during the day, the polyps protrude from the skeleton and extend their tentacles to feed. At other times, they contract back into the safety of the skeleton. In older specimens, particularly those exceeding 2 metres (6 ft 7 in) in diameter, the regular structure sometimes breaks down near the centre and there are growth anomalies. It has been found that these are not deleterious to the survival of the coral and may be caused by stress factors such as raised sea temperatures.

== Distribution and habitat ==
Acropora cytherea is one of the most plentiful members of the genus Acropora. It is found in the Indo-Pacific Ocean from the Red Sea and the east coast of Africa to India, the China Sea, Japan, Australia, Micronesia and Hawaii. It is found below low tide mark in clear shallow water with little wave action, in lagoons and upper reef slopes and back reef slopes.

== Ecology ==
Several small crabs are obligate associates of corals, feeding on coral tissues but protecting the coral from attack by predators such as the crown-of-thorns starfish. One of these, Cymo melanodactylus, lives in association with Acropora cytherea but its low numbers (fewer than three per coral) mean that its host suffers little harm. In the Chagos Archipelago these crabs have shown a change in their behaviour and have been found in large numbers infesting diseased and dying corals. In 2010 in the Archipelago, infestations of over 45 of these crabs were found on individual heads of A. cytherea exhibiting dead and dying tissue. The crabs were in close proximity to the damaged tissues but it was unclear whether the crabs were the original cause of the damage or whether they had moved in to exploit the already dying tissues.
