= Kymo =

Island in Sitia Municipality, Greece

Native name: Κυμώ
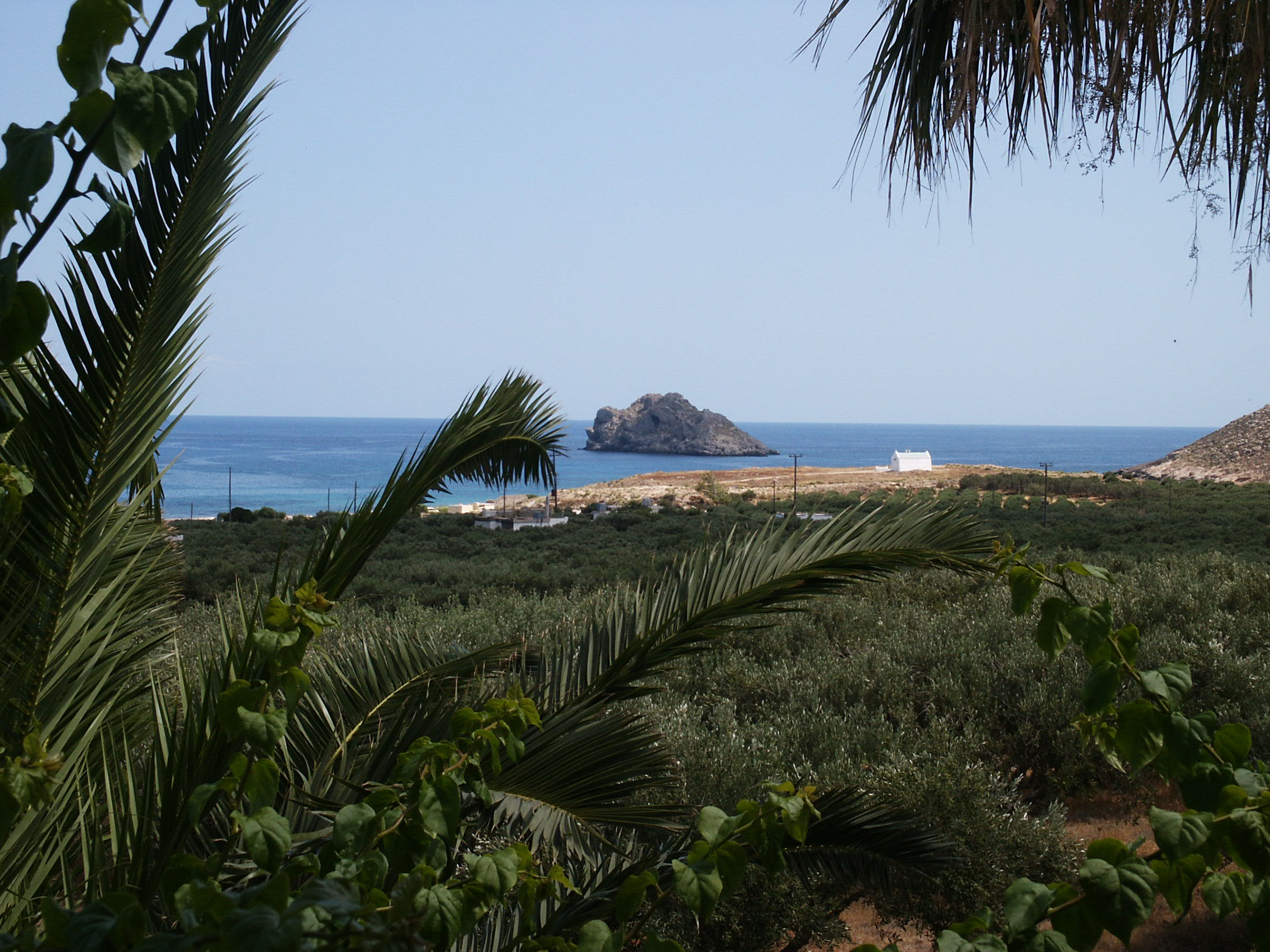
- The islet of Kymo.
- Interactive map of Kymo

Geography
- Coordinates: 35°00′54″N 26°11′58″E
- Archipelago: Cretan Islands

Administration
- Greece
- Region: Crete
- Regional unit: Lasithi

Demographics
- Population: 0 (2001)

Kymo (Greek: Κυμώ), also called Koumeli (Greek: Κούμελη), is a Greek islet, in the Libyan Sea, close to the eastern coast of Crete. Administratively it lies within the Lefki municipality of Lasithi.

== See also ==
- List of islands of Greece
