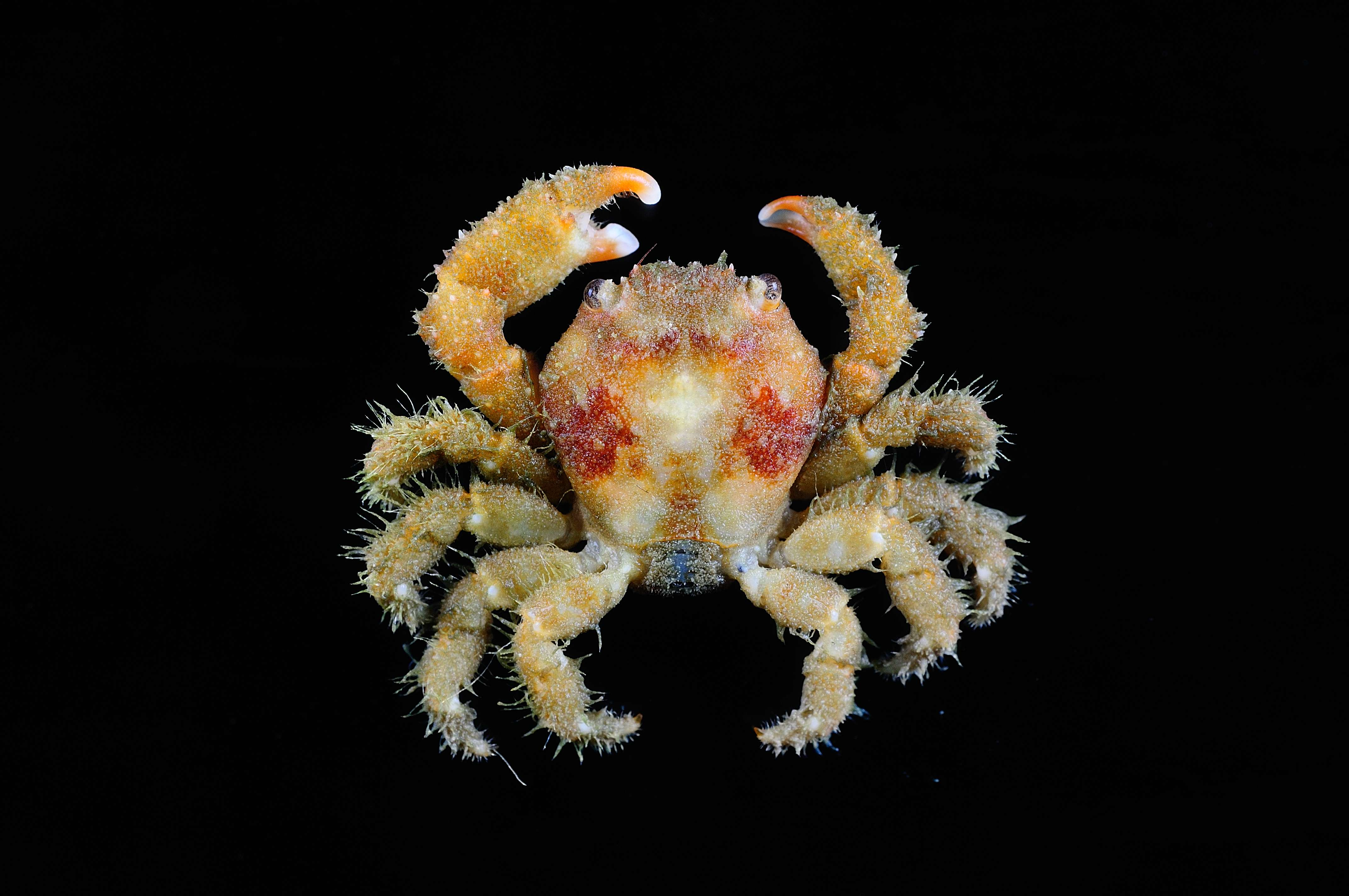
- Cymo cerasma

Scientific classification
- Domain: Eukaryota
- Kingdom: Animalia
- Phylum: Arthropoda
- Class: Malacostraca
- Order: Decapoda
- Suborder: Pleocyemata
- Infraorder: Brachyura
- Family: Xanthidae
- Subfamily: Cymoinae; Alcock, 1898
- Genus: Cymo; De Haan, 1833

= Cymo (crab) =

Genus of crabs

Cymo is a genus of crabs in the family Xanthidae, containing the following species:

- Cymo andreossyi (Audouin, 1826)
- Cymo barunae Ho & Ng, 2005
- Cymo cerasma Morgan, 1990
- Cymo deplanatus A. Milne-Edwards, 1873
- Cymo lanatopodus Galil & Vannini, 1990
- Cymo mazu Yuan, Jiang & Sha, 2023
- Cymo melanodactylus Dana, 1852
- Cymo quadrilobatus Miers, 1884
- Cymo tuberculatus Ortmann, 1893
