= Antonio Nasini =

Italian Baroque painter and priest

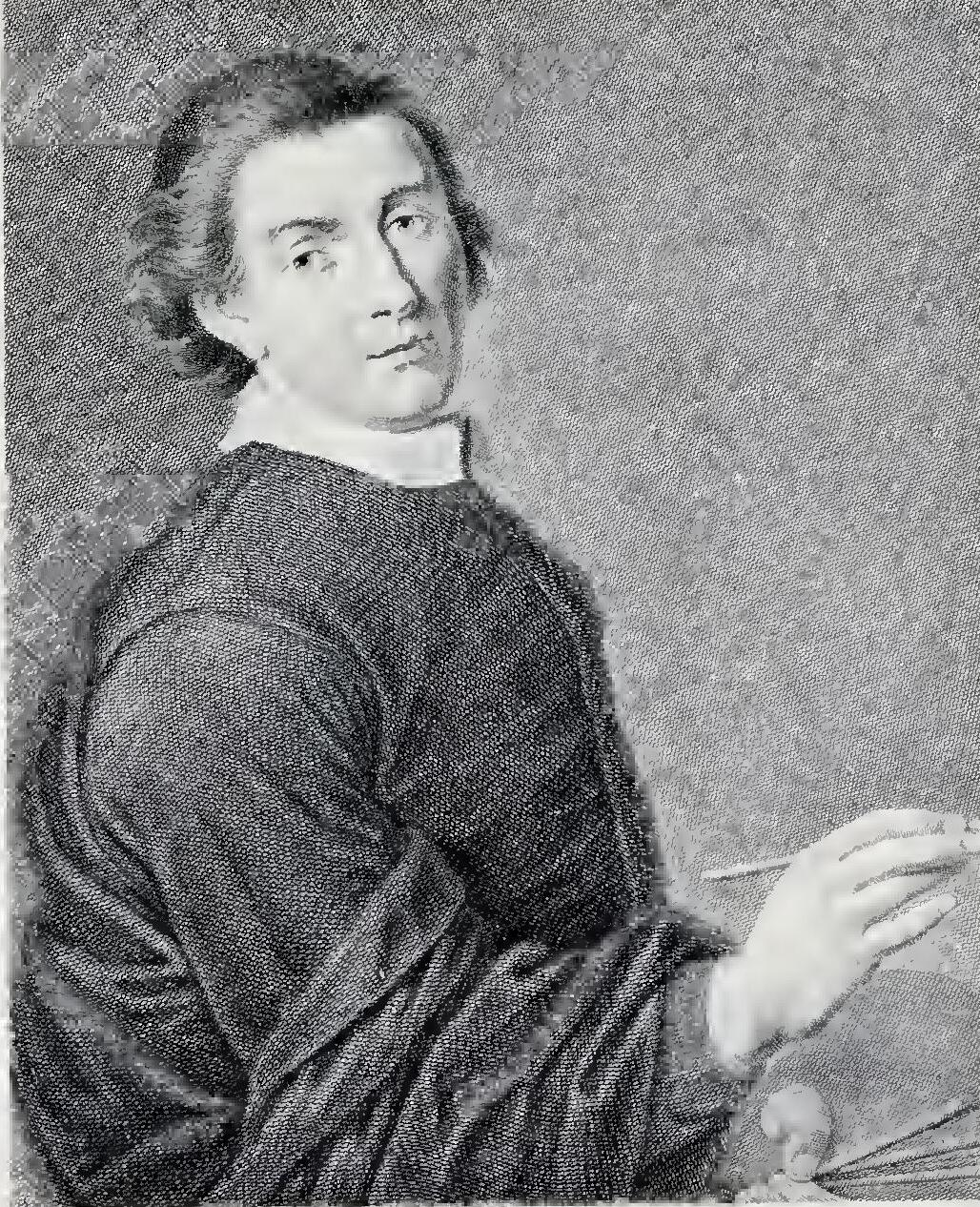
- Self-portrait
- Born: 11 January 1643; Castel del Piano, Grand Duchy of Tuscany
- Died: 28 June 1715 (aged 72); Torrenieri, Grand Duchy of Tuscany
- Occupations: Painter, Catholic priest
- Movement: Baroque
- Father: Francesco Nasini
- Relatives: Giuseppe Nicola Nasini (brother)

Antonio Nasini (11 January 1643 – 28 June 1715) was an Italian painter and Catholic priest, active in the Baroque period in the Grand Duchy of Tuscany.

== Life and career ==
Nasini was born in Castel del Piano in 1643, the eldest son of Francesco Nasini and Vittoria Bassi. He was the older brother of Giuseppe Nicola Nasini and was ordained as a priest.

His first documented work dates to 1674, when he painted a fresco in the Palazzo Pubblico in Siena. Five years later, he executed Pope Alexander VI creates six new Sienese cardinals in the lunette of the Sala del Capitano. Between 1680 and 1683, he worked alongside his father Francesco on a cycle of frescoes depicting the Life of Saint Anthony in the side chapel of the church of San Francesco in Grosseto.

In 1685, he was commissioned by Grand Duke Cosimo III de' Medici to decorate the antiport of Camollia, a project completed on 2 July 1686 with the collaboration of his brother Giuseppe Nicola. In October 1686, Nasini was granted a grand-ducal stipend allowing him to spend three years in Venice, where he studied together with his brother and their cousin Tommaso Nasini.

Around mid-1689, he left Venice and moved briefly to Fontanellato, where he painted two works influenced by Tintoretto: the Invention of the True Cross in the church of Santa Croce and Saint Charles Borromeo Healing a Plague Victim in the Rocca Sanvitale chapel.

He returned to Siena in 1690, where he completed major works including decorations for the church of San Donato (1690–1693), the painting Aeneas Sylvius Caprara-Piccolomini at the Battle of Uskopia for the Palazzo Pubblico (1690), and several other commissions in churches in Siena and the surrounding areas of Buonconvento, Montalcino, and Asciano.

Nasini died on 28 June 1715 in Torrenieri, near Montalcino.

A self-portrait is held in the Uffizi Gallery.
