= San Francesco, Grosseto =

San Francesco
- Church of Saint Francis
- Chiesa di San Francesco (Italian)
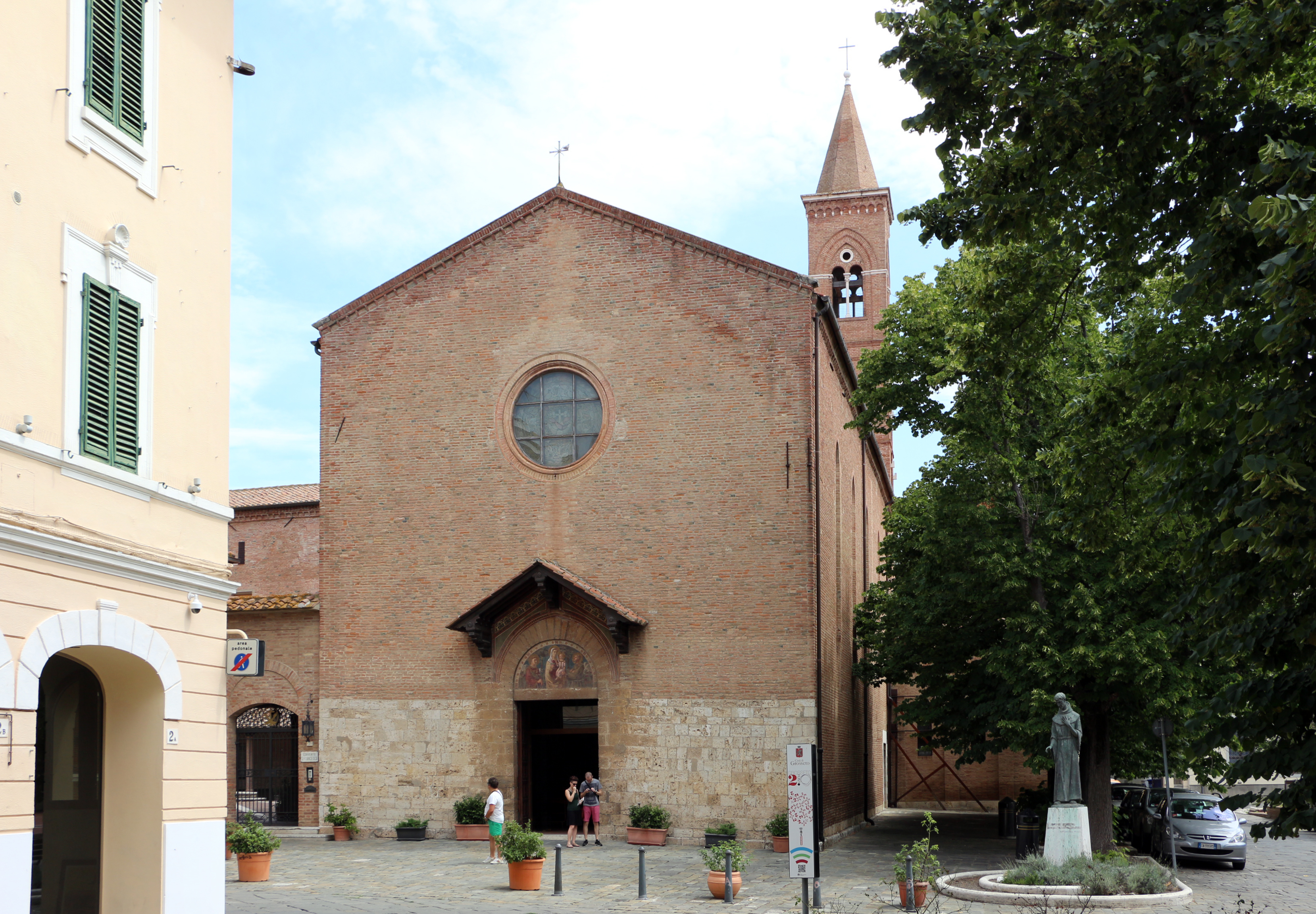
- San Francesco
- 42.76203°N 11.11439°E
- Location: Grosseto, Tuscany
- Address: Piazza San Francesco
- Country: Italy
- Denomination: Roman Catholic
- Tradition: Latin Rite

History
- Status: Parish church Convent

Architecture
- Architectural type: Church
- Completed: 1289

Administration
- Diocese: Diocese of Grosseto

San Francesco is a Roman Catholic church in Grosseto, Tuscany, Italy. Built for the Franciscan Order between the late 13th and early 14th centuries on the site of the former Benedictine monastery of San Fortunato, it is one of the oldest surviving religious buildings in the city.

The church has a simple brick exterior and a single-nave interior reflecting the austerity traditionally associated with Franciscan churches. Although altered by Baroque additions during the 17th century, including the chapel of Saint Anthony of Padua, the building largely gained its current appearance through extensive restoration campaigns carried out between the late 19th and early 20th centuries under the direction of architect Lorenzo Porciatti.

San Francesco houses several notable works of art, including a late 13th-century painted crucifix attributed either to Duccio or the Master of Badia a Isola, fragments of 14th and 15th-century frescoes, an Annunciation by Francesco Curradi, and a cycle of frescoes by Antonio and Francesco Nasini in the chapel of Saint Anthony of Padua.

== History ==
The presence of the Franciscans in Grosseto is first documented on 6 December 1233, when a notarial deed records the sale of a plot of agricultural land located in contrada fratrum minorum ("in the district of the Friars Minor"). The document, preserved in the State Archives of Siena, provides the earliest known evidence of the Franciscan Order in the city and indicates that the friars had already established a sufficiently prominent presence for the surrounding area to take its name from their settlement.

The Franciscans established their convent on the site of the former Benedictine monastery of San Fortunato. A document of 1300 still refers to the area as contrada Sancti Francisci ("district of Saint Francis"), suggesting that a small settlement had developed around the convent and church. Scholars have proposed that this district originally lay outside the medieval walls of Grosseto and was only incorporated into the urban fabric during the city's late medieval expansion. The development of the area around San Francesco, together with its connection to the church and hospital of San Leonardo, formed part of the final phase of medieval urban growth in Grosseto.

According to a seventeenth-century inscription preserved in the church, Pope Nicholas IV ordered in 1289 that the former church of San Fortunato should henceforth be dedicated to Saint Francis. Construction of a new church may already have been underway before the papal decree. In 1284 Count Ildebrandino Aldobrandeschi left a donation for the fabrica ecclesiae ("building of the church"), while additional bequests for the construction of the church are recorded in the wills of local residents in 1295 and 1319. These documents demonstrate the strong support enjoyed by the Franciscans among the citizens of Grosseto and indicate that construction continued through the late thirteenth and early fourteenth centuries.

For several centuries San Francesco served as one of the city's principal burial churches. Prominent citizens and local noble families were interred within the church and its cloister, often leaving donations to the convent in their wills. Among those buried there were the magistrate Domenico di Matteo Angeli (d. 1477), the apothecary Gherardo Giovannetti (d. 1504), and the military commander Camillo Nelli, who died in Grosseto in 1629 while serving as commander of the city's fortress. By 1579 the façade was reported to be in danger of collapse and subsequently underwent repairs. Major alterations were carried out between the late sixteenth and early eighteenth centuries, including the rebuilding of the bell tower in 1623, the construction of the chapel of Saint Anthony of Padua in 1641, and the replacement of several medieval altars with Baroque furnishings.

After the suppression of religious orders under Napoleonic rule, the church and convent were abandoned around 1810 and adapted for secular purposes. The complex first served as an infirmary for workers employed in the Maremma land-reclamation projects, who were frequently affected by malaria. Later, Bishop Giovanni Domenico Mensini temporarily transferred the cathedral chapter and episcopal see there during the restoration of Grosseto Cathedral. The buildings were subsequently used by the municipality as warehouses, and it remained closed for worship until 1880, when it was returned to ecclesiastical use. Following extensive restoration work, the church was reopened on 9 June 1895.

The restorations of the late nineteenth and early twentieth centuries sought to recover the building's medieval appearance. Numerous Baroque altars and furnishings were removed, revealing previously concealed fourteenth- and fifteenth-century frescoes, including a notable image of the Virgin influenced by the style of the Sienese painter Niccolò di Segna. From 1900 onward, architect Lorenzo Porciatti directed further restoration campaigns inspired by contemporary work at the church of San Francesco in Siena. The façade was restored to a simpler Gothic appearance, the choir's pointed windows were reopened, and stained-glass windows were installed. The present bell tower, designed by Porciatti, was completed in 1926. The church was returned to the Franciscans in 1924 by Bishop Gustavo Matteoni.

The church was established as a parish by bishop Paolo Galeazzi on 11 February 1949.

== Description ==
=== Façade ===
The façade is a simple gabled structure typical of Tuscan mendicant architecture. Its lower section is faced with travertine ashlar up to the height of the portal lintel, while the remainder of the building is constructed entirely of brick.

The main portal is surmounted by a round arch containing a lunette fresco depicting Saints Francis and Fortunatus, painted by Giuseppe Casucci. According to local tradition, the painting reproduces an earlier fresco that had already deteriorated by the time major repairs were carried out on the façade in 1579.

The façade is crowned by a row of terracotta corbels, a decorative feature more characteristic of Sienese Gothic architecture than of the austere Franciscan style. The present circular window is not original; traces of an earlier square opening survive in the upper part of the façade. The large pointed-arch windows that illuminate the church today largely result from restoration work undertaken in the early 20th-century, replacing smaller openings altered during the 17th-century.

=== Interior ===
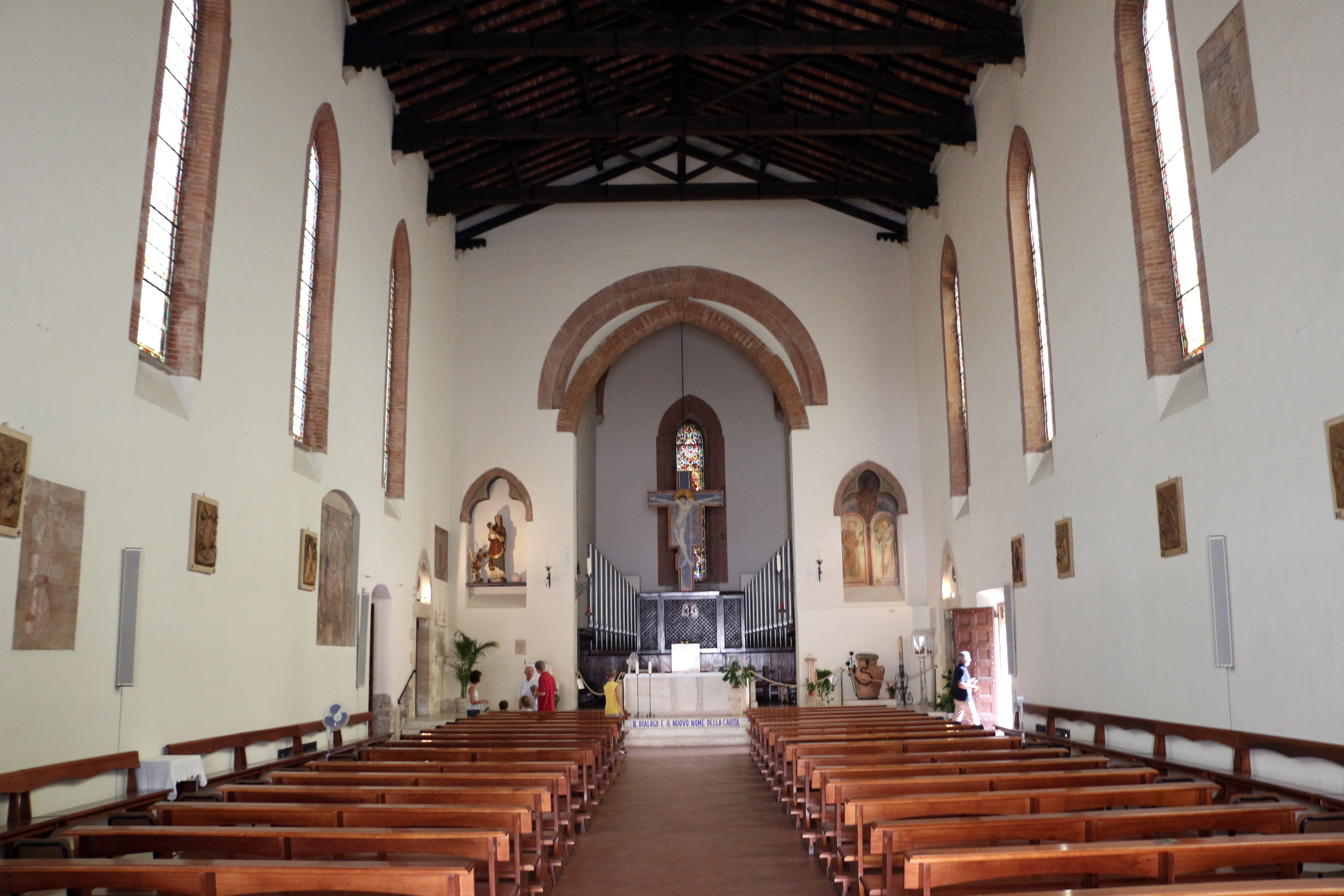
The interior

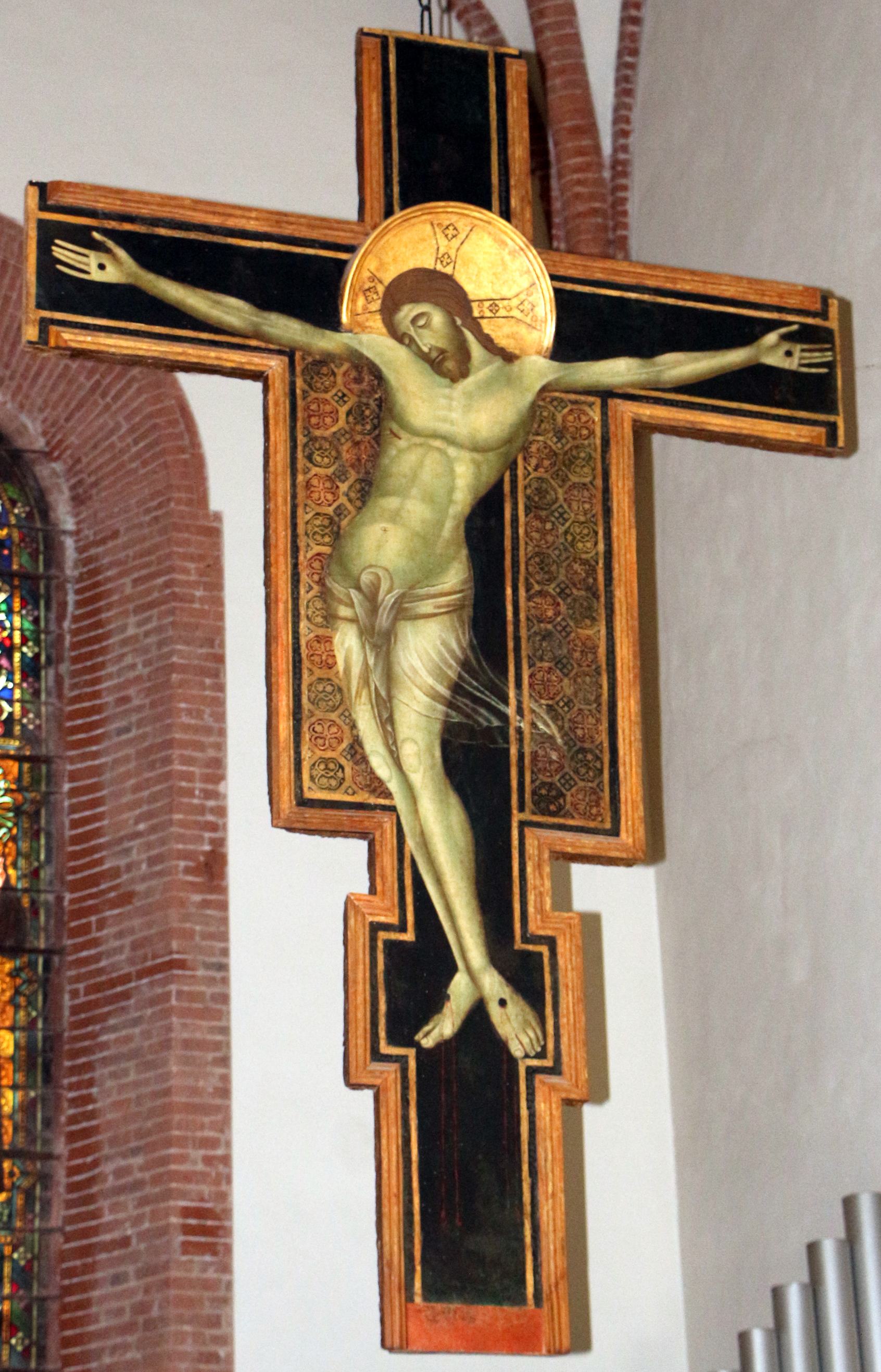
The painted crucifix

The interior consists of a single wide nave with an exposed timber roof, terminating in a rectangular choir chapel covered by a rib-vault. Two small side recesses with trefoil arches flank the choir. Above the pointed triumphal arch is a partially visible round arch belonging to an earlier phase of construction.

The walls preserve fragments of medieval frescoes that were uncovered during 19th-century restorations, when numerous Baroque altars were removed in an effort to restore the church's original appearance. Among the most notable are a monumental Saint Anthony Abbot enthroned, a Saint Christopher, and a 14th-century Madonna stylistically close to the work of Niccolò di Segna. Other frescoes include a later depiction of the Madonna and Child with Saint James the Great and a standing female saint, possibly Catherine of Alexandria. Additional 15th and 16th-century frescoes depicting Saints Francis of Assisi and Bernardino of Siena survive in a niche to the right of the choir. Two elegant 16th-century angels of the Umbrian-Sienese school are preserved above the baptismal font near the entrance.

The current high altar dates from 1972 and replaced the monumental stucco altar erected in 1709.

The most important work of art in the church is the painted crucifix displayed above the high altar. Dating from the late 13th-century, it has been variously attributed either to the young Duccio di Buoninsegna, Master of Badia a Isola, or Guido di Graziano. The crucifix is regarded as one of the finest surviving medieval artworks in Grosseto.

Two paintings not originally belonging to the church are also preserved there: a 17th-century Saint Francis in Ecstasy attributed to the school of Guido Reni, and an Annunciation by Francesco Curradi, dated 1615 and now kept in the sacristy.

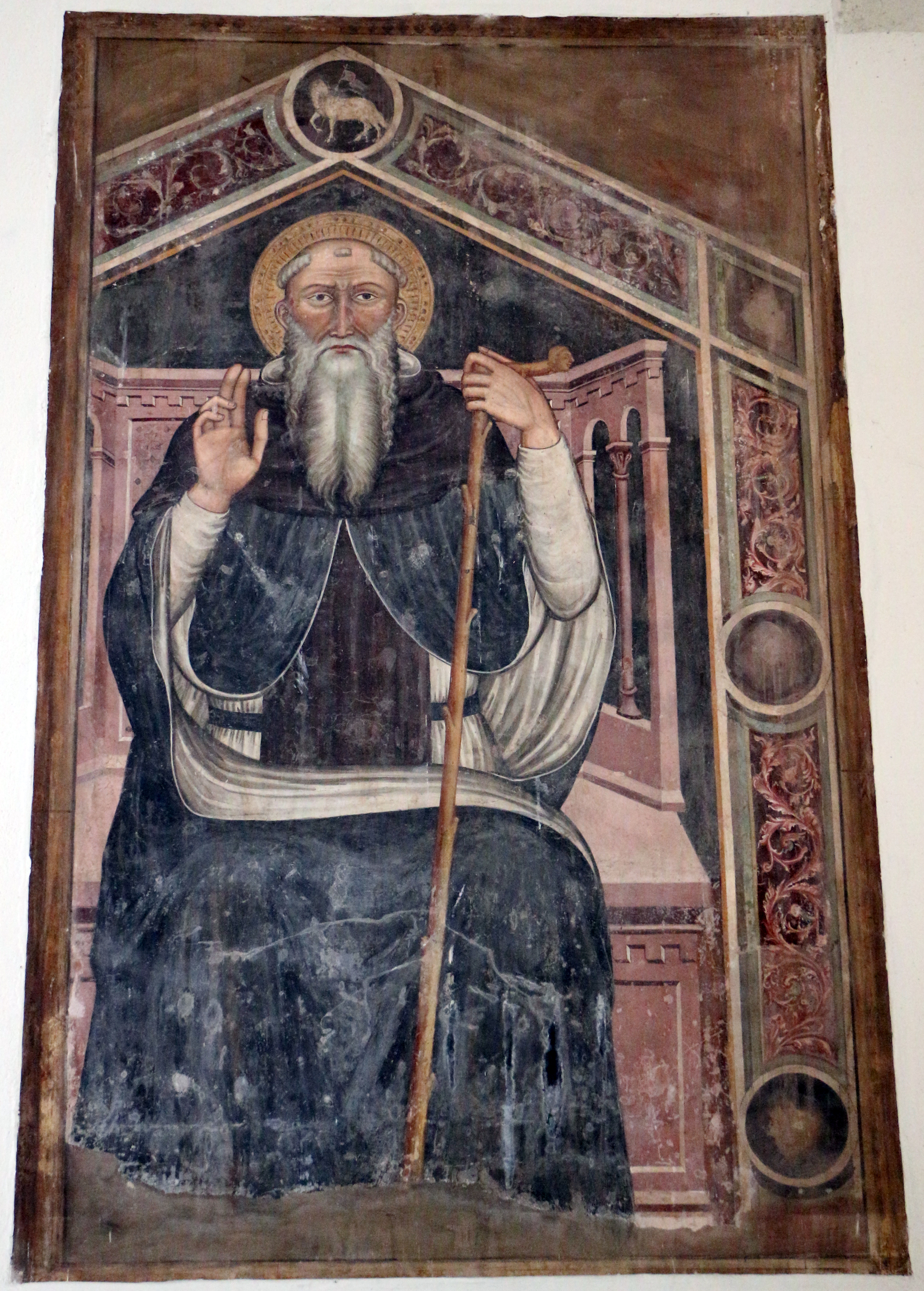
Saint Anthony Abbot

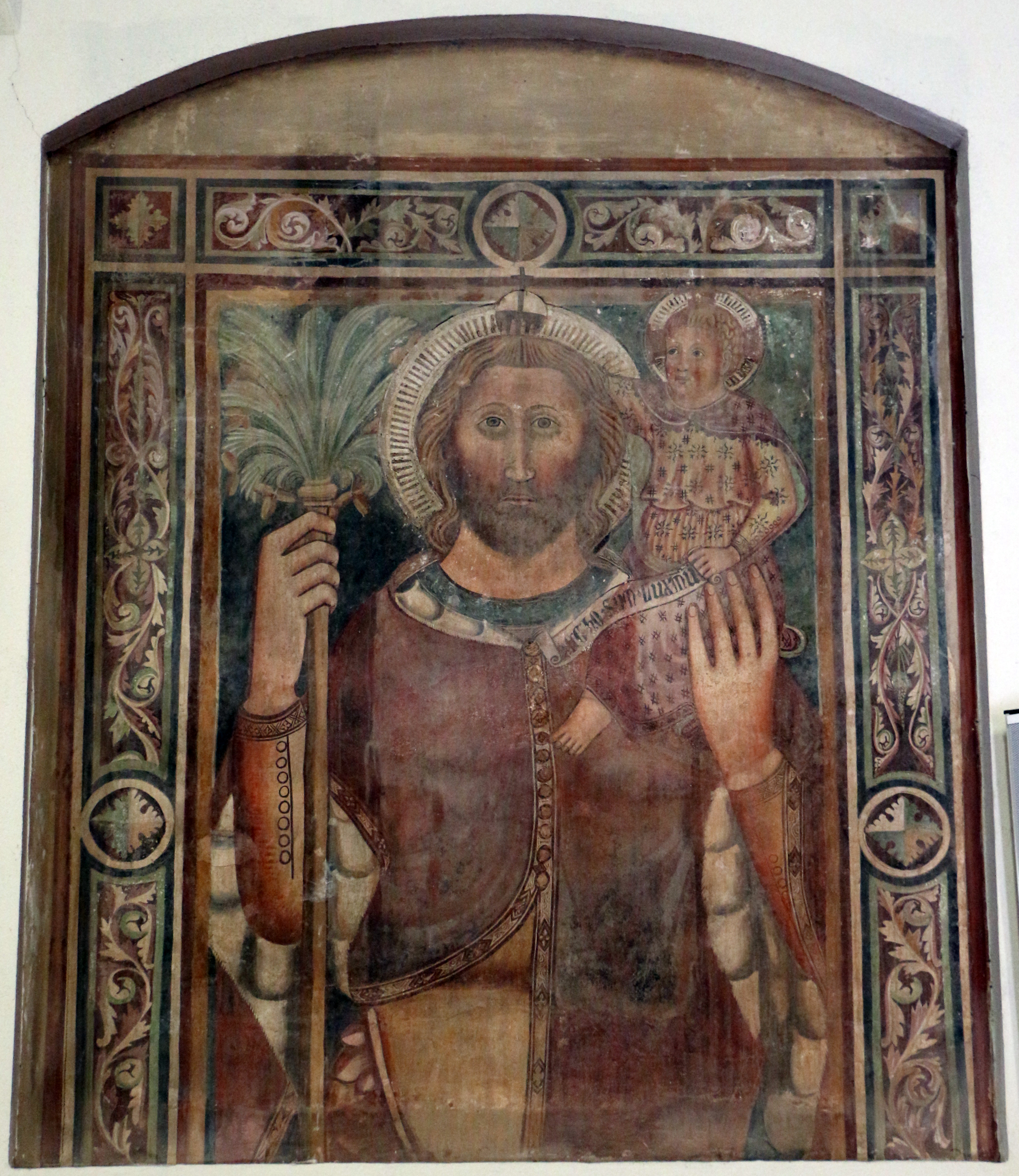
Saint Christopher

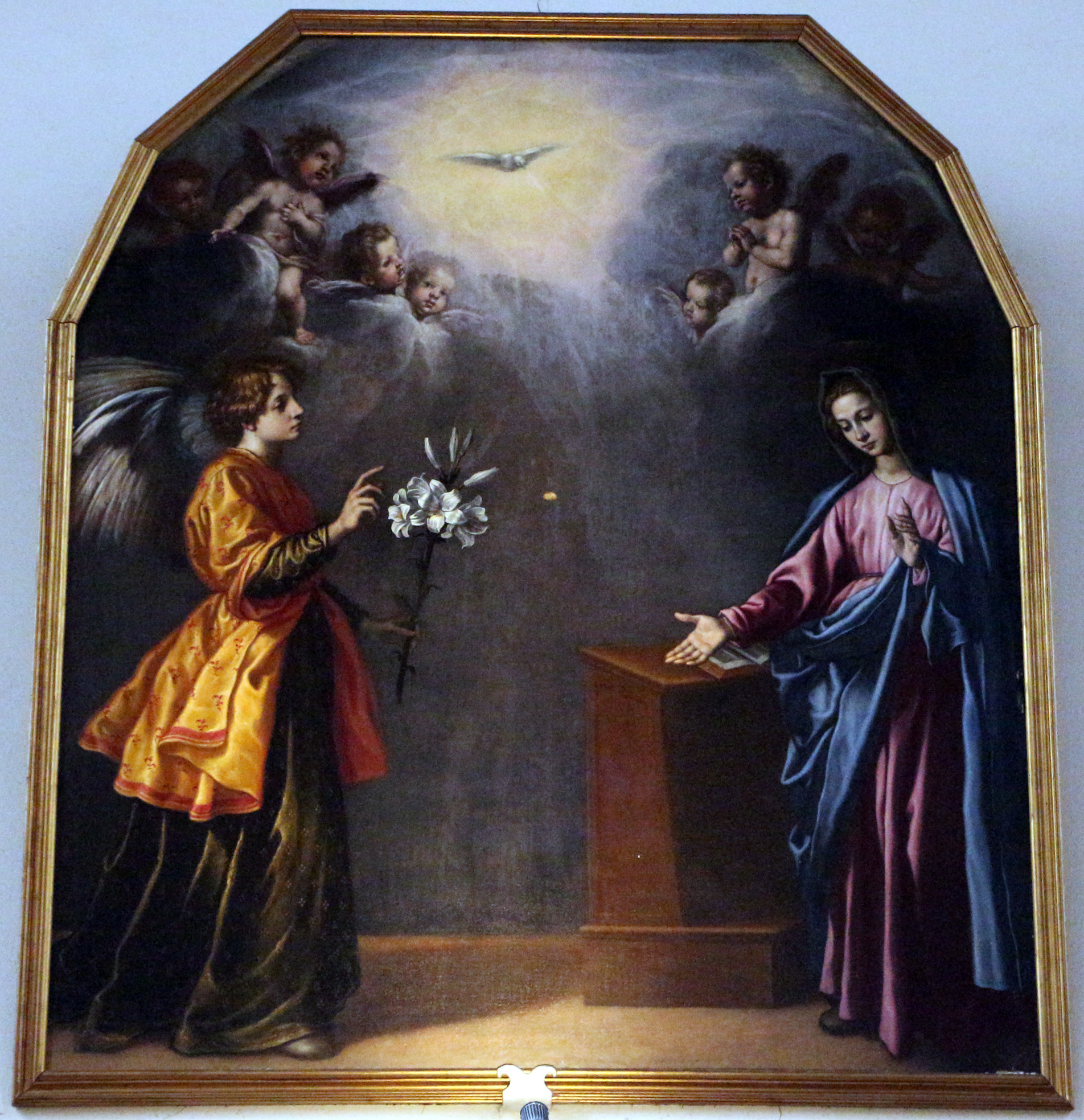
Annunciation by Francesco Curradi

=== Chapel of Saint Anthony of Padua ===
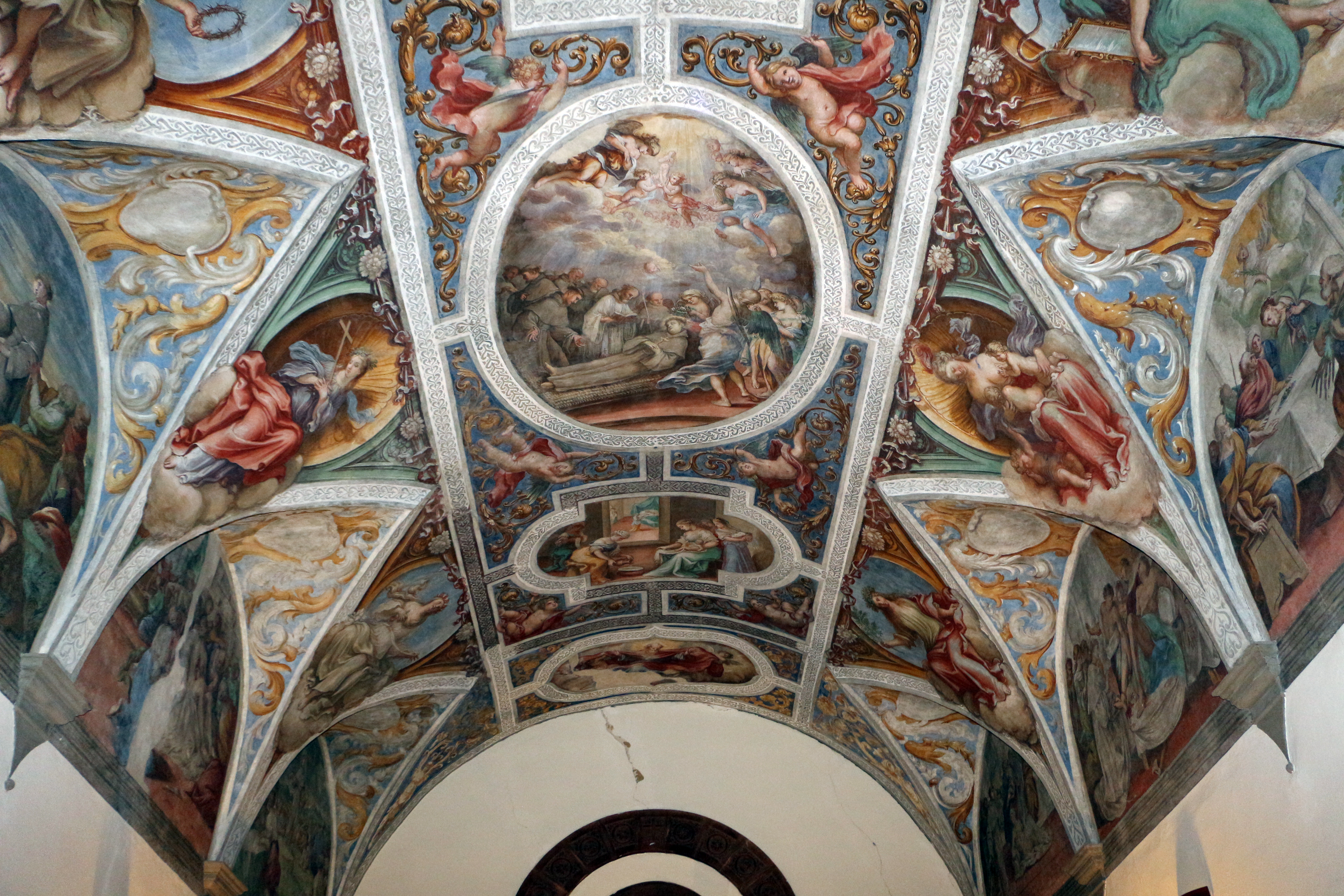
The chapel's vault

The chapel of Saint Anthony of Padua, accessed from the right side of the choir, was built in 1641 in response to the strong local devotion to the saint. Its construction significantly altered the medieval external appearance of the church.

The chapel is covered by a barrel vault decorated with frescoes and divided into five compartments. It contains a cycle illustrating episodes from the life of Saint Anthony, surrounded by ornamental foliage, putti and allegories of the virtues. The central oval and scenes depicting the saint's miracles were painted by Antonio Nasini in 1679 on commission from Violante Biagi, prioress of the Confraternity of Saint Anthony. The remaining frescoes on the vault and lunettes were completed in 1683 by Francesco Nasini.

== Convent and cloister ==
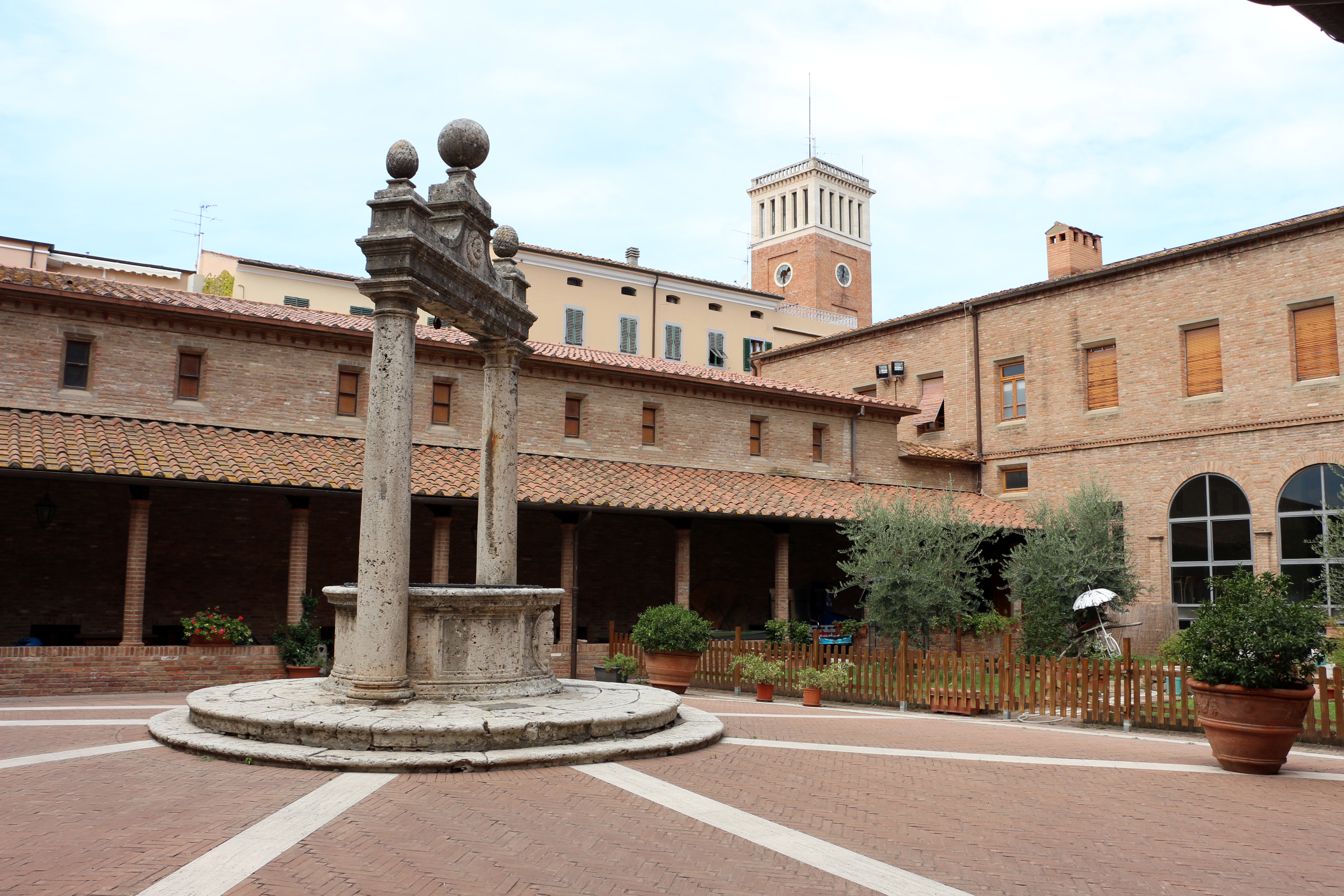
The cloister

The convent is located to the left of the façade of the church. At its centre lies the cloister, surrounded by arcaded porticoes that structure the internal circulation of the monastic buildings. In the early modern period, the complex was significantly altered, particularly following the construction of the Medici fortifications in the late 16th century, which reduced its original extent and led to major architectural reorganisation.

The convent originally included two cloisters, each provided with a well and serving different functional and spatial roles within the monastic complex. The construction of a main well in 1590 required substantial alterations to the cloister. The central area was paved and raised, transforming what was likely a simple grassed courtyard into a more formal architectural space.

According to an 18th-century account by Francesco Anichini, the well takes its popular name "Pozzo della Bufala" ("Buffalo Well") from a local legend in which a buffalo, escaping while being led to slaughter, broke free and fell into the cistern during its construction. The episode became part of local tradition and gave the well its enduring name.

During the second half of the 20th century, the convent and cloister underwent restoration works, including the construction of the San Francesco nursery school building on Via Saffi. On 15 October 1972, the Opera "Giuseppe Friuli" cultural centre was inaugurated. It was funded by Alfredo Friuli, lawyer and director of the local Industrial Association, and his wife Niccolina Nocentini in memory of their only son, who died at the age of 28 in a road accident. It was designed by engineer Leone Feroci and built by the Venturi company on the site of the former convent granary and dormitory. The Opera Friuli was restored with a renovated auditorium in 2012, on a design by architects Lucia Corrieri and Massimo Felicioni, and engineer Enrico Romualdi.

== Sources ==
- Mariagrazia Celuzza; Mauro Papa, eds. (2013), Grosseto visibile. Guida alla città e alla sua arte pubblica, Arcidosso: Edizioni Effigi
