= Montegiovi =

- Frazione
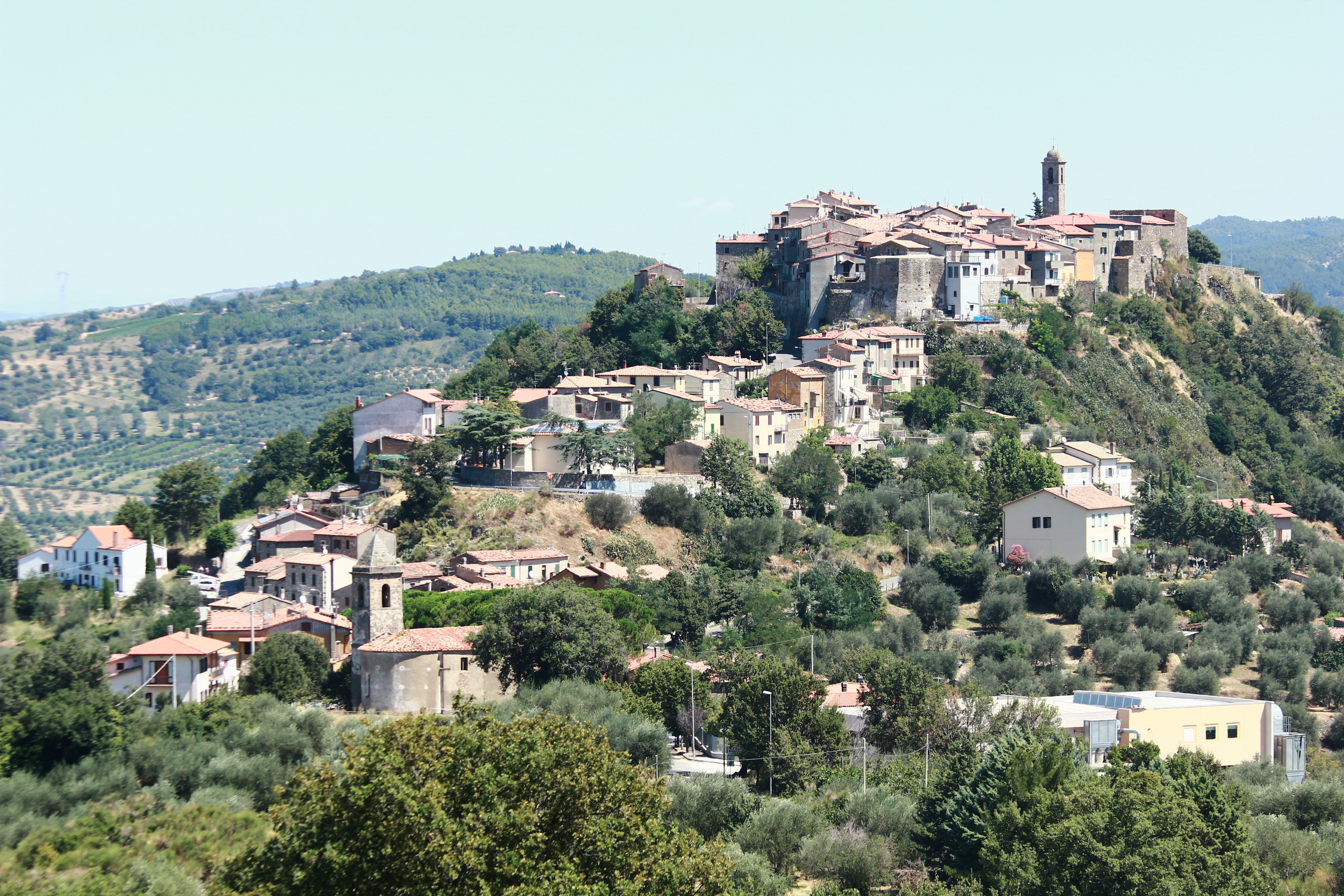
- View of Montegiovi

- Location of Montegiovi in Italy
- Coordinates: 42°54′39″N 11°31′15″E
- Country: Italy
- Region: Tuscany
- Province: Grosseto (GR)
- Comune: Castel del Piano
- Elevation: 487 m (1,598 ft)

Population (2011)
  - Total: 175
- Demonym: Montegiovesi
- Time zone: UTC+1 (CET)
  - Summer (DST): UTC+2 (CEST)
- Postal code: 58030
- Dialing code: (+39) 0564

Montegiovi is a village in Tuscany, central Italy, administratively a frazione of the comune of Castel del Piano, province of Grosseto, in the area of Mount Amiata. At the time of the 2001 census its population amounted to 168.

Montegiovi is about 50 km from Grosseto and 5 km from Castel del Piano, and it is situated on a hill in the western limit of Val d'Orcia.

== Main sights ==
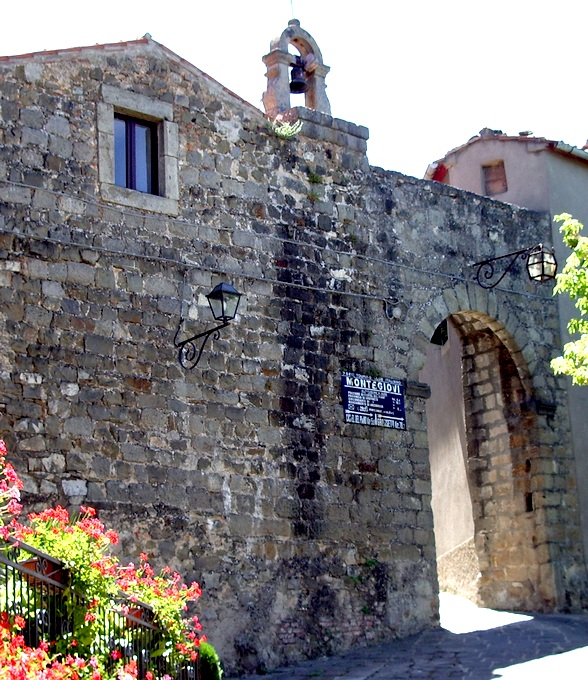
The main gate with the chapel of Sant'Elena

- Church of San Martino (13th century), main parish church of the village
- Church of Madonna degli Schiavi (16th century), also known as Madonna delle Grazie, with frescoes by Francesco Nasini, it was re-built in the 19th century
- Chapel of Sant'Elena, ancient church at the service of the castle of Montegiovi
- Walls of Montegiovi, old fortifications which surround the village since the 12th century
- The Giardino di Piero Bonacina, a contemporary art garden with sculptures by artist Piero Bonacina.

== Bibliography ==
- Aldo Mazzolai, Guida della Maremma. Percorsi tra arte e natura, Le Lettere, Florence, 1997
- Giuseppe Guerrini, Torri e castelli della Provincia di Grosseto, Nuova Immagine Editrice, Siena, 1999

== See also ==
- Castel del Piano
- Montenero d'Orcia
- Val d'Orcia
