= Montenero d'Orcia =

Village in Tuscany, Italy

- Frazione
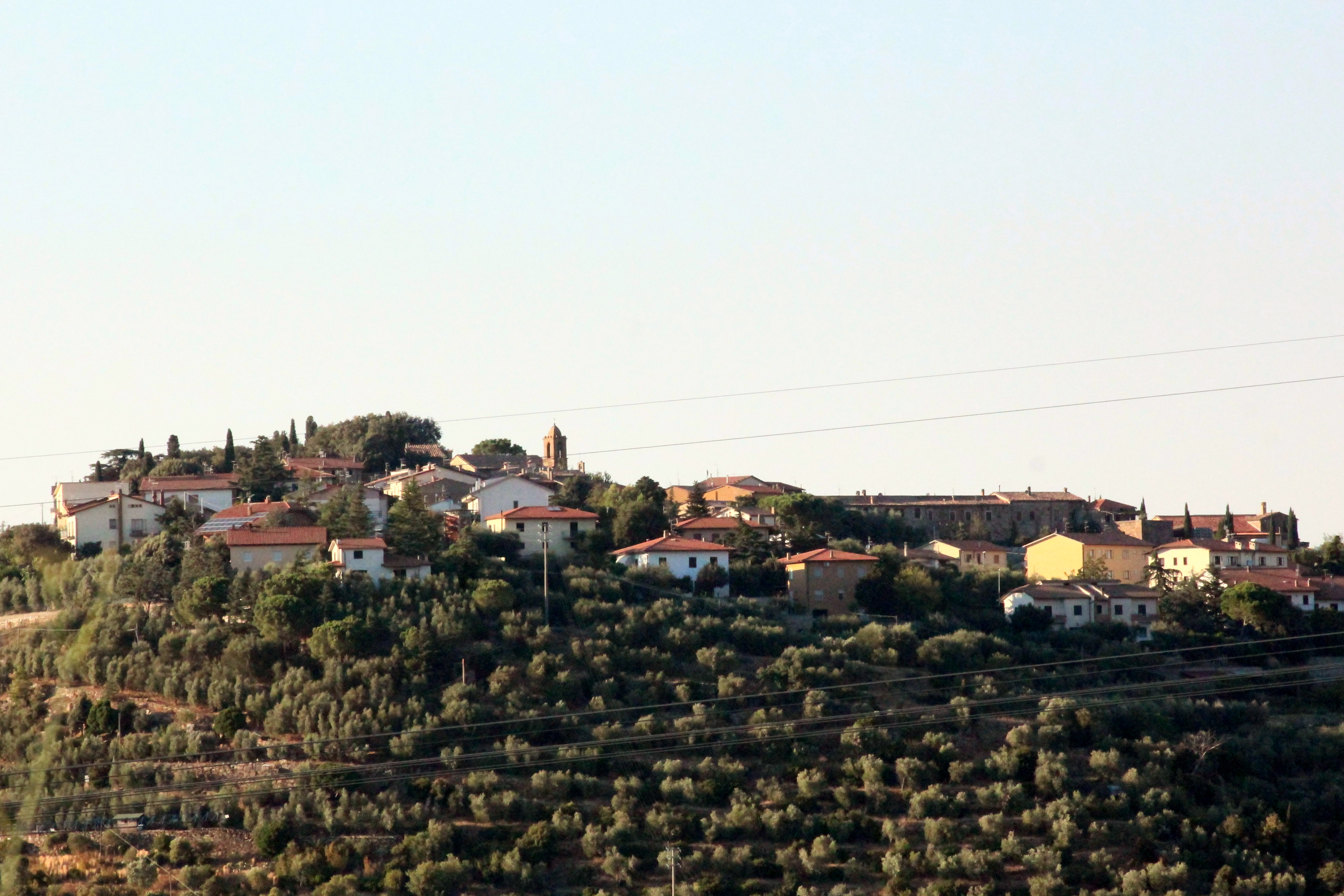
- View of Montenero d'Orcia

- Location of Montenero d'Orcia in Italy
- Coordinates: 42°56′39″N 11°28′20″E
- Country: Italy
- Region: Tuscany
- Province: Grosseto (GR)
- Comune: Castel del Piano
- Elevation: 350 m (1,150 ft)

Population (2011)
  - Total: 243
- Demonym: Montenerini
- Time zone: UTC+1 (CET)
  - Summer (DST): UTC+2 (CEST)
- Postal code: 58040
- Dialing code: (+39) 0564

Montenero d'Orcia is a village in Tuscany, central Italy, administratively a frazione of the comune of Castel del Piano, province of Grosseto, in the area of Mount Amiata. At the time of the 2001 census its population amounted to 253.

Montenero is about 44 km from Grosseto and 14 km from Castel del Piano, and it is situated on a hill between the valleys of Orcia and Ombrone rivers.

== Main sights ==
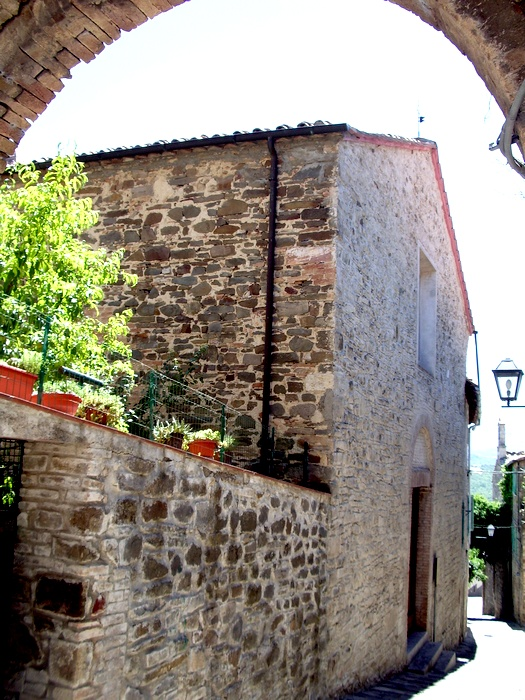
The ancient pieve di Santa Lucia

- Pieve di Santa Lucia (12th century), main parish church of the village, with a wooden Crocefisso by Ambrogio Lorenzetti
- Church of Madonna (16th century), former church now deconsecrated
- Walls of Montenero, old fortifications which surround the village since the 10th century
- Cassero Senese, a 13th-century fortress, it was re-built in the 15th century
- Museum of Vine and Wine, little museum of local history about the traditions of grape growing and wine production in Montenero

== Bibliography ==
- Aldo Mazzolai, Guida della Maremma. Percorsi tra arte e natura, Le Lettere, Florence, 1997
- Giuseppe Guerrini, Torri e castelli della Provincia di Grosseto, Nuova Immagine Editrice, Siena, 1999

== See also ==
- Castel del Piano
- Montegiovi
- Val d'Orcia
