= Giuseppe Tonelli =

Italian painter (1668–1732)

Giuseppe Tonelli (1668–1732) was an Italian painter of the Baroque period, active mainly in Florence. He studied under Tommaso Aldrovandini and Jacopo Chiavistelli. He worked alongside Giuseppe Nasini during 1696–1699 in frescoing the ceiling of second floor corridor of the Uffizi gallery facing the Arno. He painted quadratura for Sebastiano Ricci in the Pitti Palace.

== Sources ==
- Hobbes, James R. (1849). Picture collector's manual adapted to the professional man, and the amateur. London: T&W Boone. p. 4.
- Uffizi gallery.
