= San Donato, Siena =

Roman Catholic church in Tuscany, Italy

Coordinates: 43.321862°N 11.331525°E

San Donato, also called San Michele al Monte di San Donato, is a Baroque style, Roman Catholic church located on the Piazza on Via dell'Abbadia, Siena, region of Tuscany, Italy. The Monte de Paschi di Siena, whose original offices were in the Palazzo Salimbeni, whose rear facade faces the church, has a Pinacoteca/Museum called San Donato.

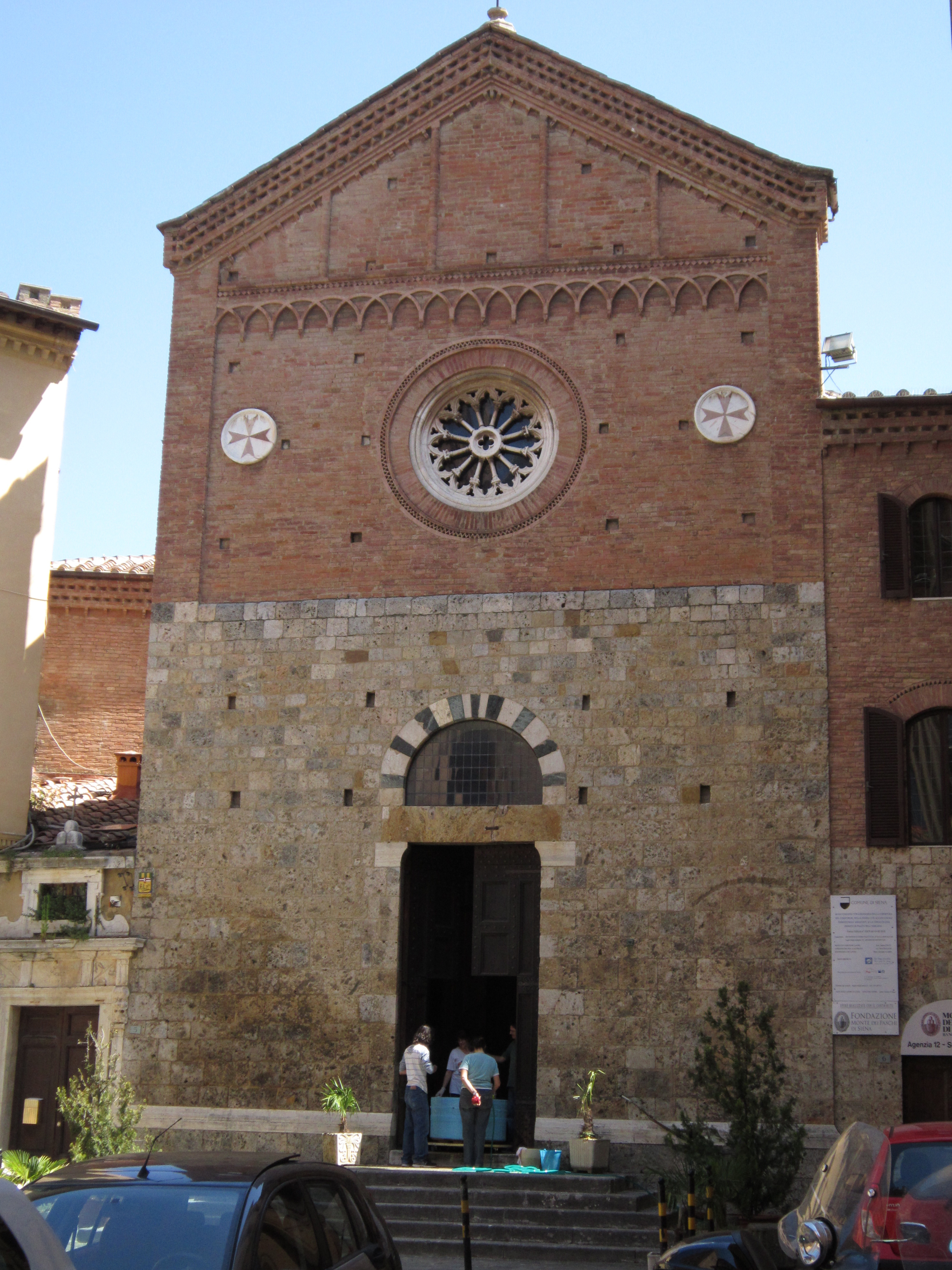
San Donato

== History ==
A church, initially titled to St Michael Archangel, and named San Michele in Poggio, was present here by 1119. It initially was attached to a Vallombrosan Abbey, founded in 1096 by Pietro da Siena. In 1683, it was transferred to the Carmelite Order, and rebuilt in Baroque style. In 1816, it became a parish church under the present dedication.

The present facade was restored in a neo-medieval style in 1940–1942. The lower portion is made of stone, while to top is brick with a marble rose window. Traces of the romanesque church remain in the crossing.

The main altar has two marble angels attributed to Giuseppe Mazzuoli. Among the works inside the church are a Christ with Crown of Spines by Sebastiano Folli, a Christ appears to St John of the Cross by Giovan Battista Sorbi and five canvases depicting the Life of St Theresa of Avila by Antonio Nasini. The apse frescoes (1794) were completed by Luigi Ademollo.
