= Claudio Franci =

Italian politician

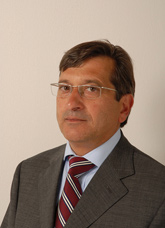

Member of the Provincial Council of Grosseto
- In office 5 July 1999 – 14 June 2004
- In office 27 January 2017 – 10 February 2019

Member of the Chamber of Deputies
- In office 2001–2008

Mayor of Castel del Piano
- In office 8 June 2009 – 26 May 2019
- Preceded by: Franco Ulivieri
- Succeeded by: Michele Bartalini

Personal details
- Born: 2 December 1956 (age 69) Castel del Piano, Province of Grosseto, Italy
- Party: DS (1998-2007); PD (since 2007)

Claudio Franci (born 2 December 1956) is an Italian politician who served as a Deputy (2001–2008) and mayor of Castel del Piano (2009–2019).
