= Giuseppe Nicola Nasini =

Italian painter (1657–1736)

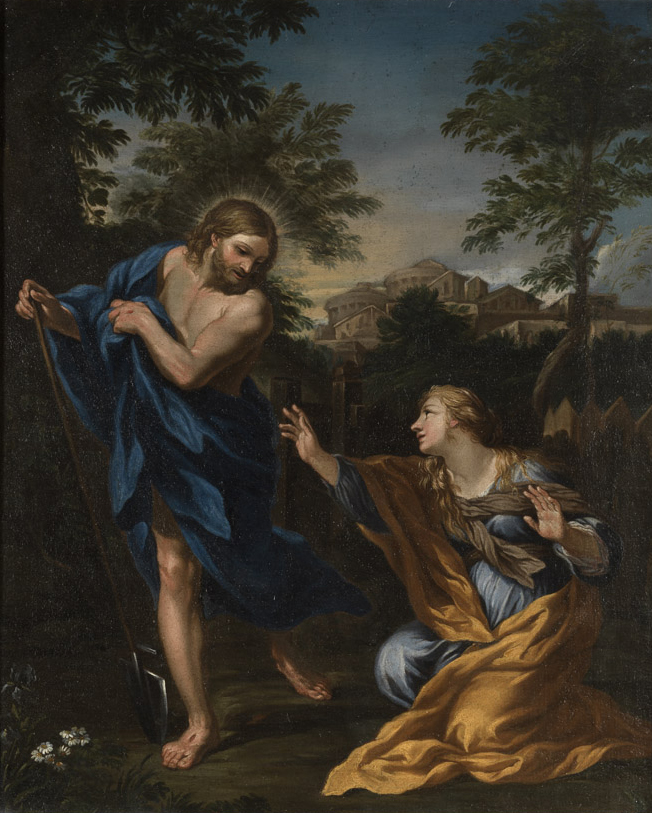
Giuseppe Nicola Nasini, Noli me Tangere

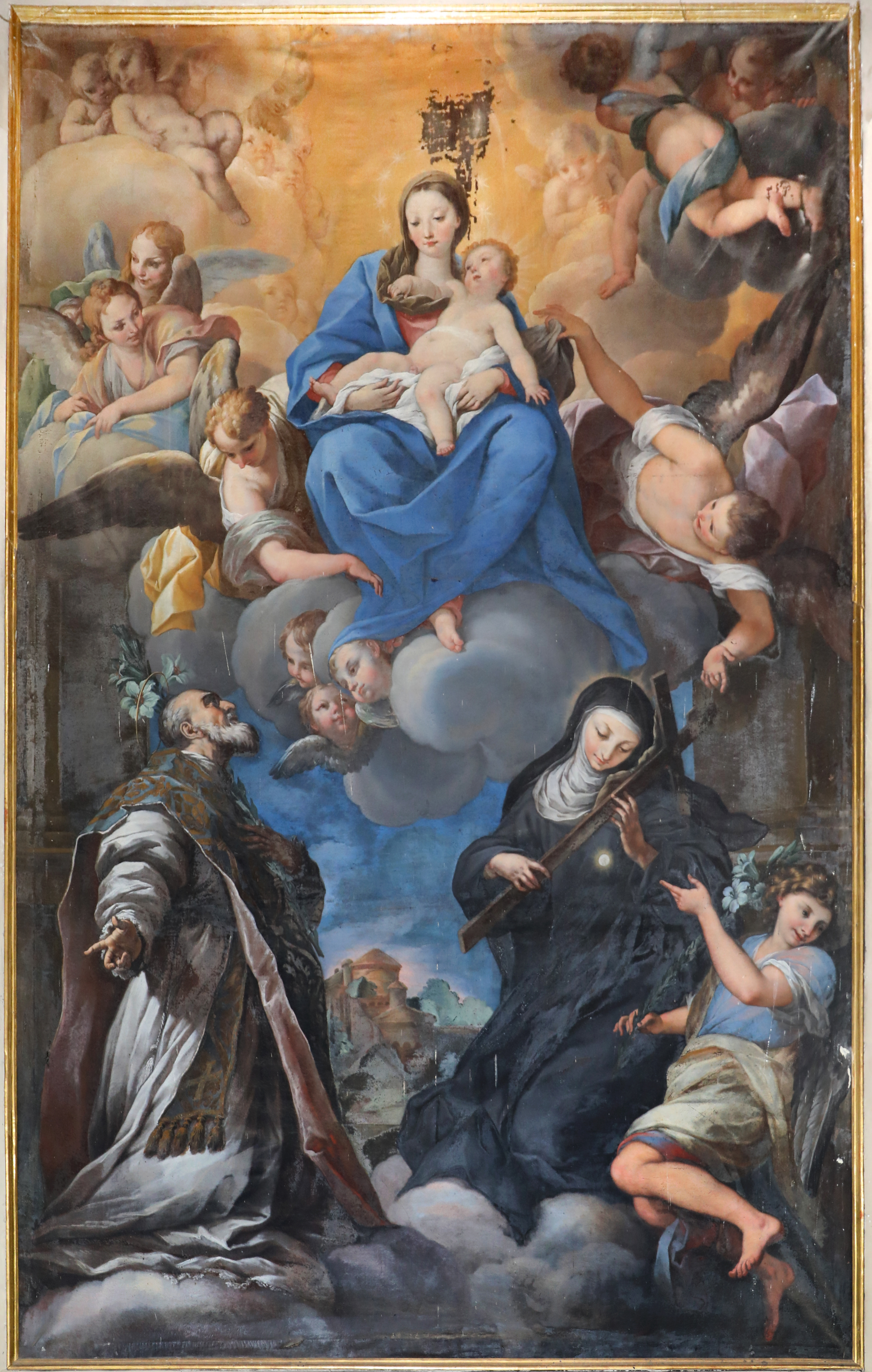
Apparition of the Madonna and Child to Saint Philip Neri and Saint Juliana Falconieri

Giuseppe Nicola Nasini (January 25, 1657 – July 3, 1736) was an Italian painter of the Baroque period and active in Rome and Tuscany.

== Biography ==
Born in Castel del Piano, now known as Province of Grosseto, Giuseppe was the son of the painter Francesco Nasini and was one of the Tuscan pupils in the Medici-patronized Grand-Ducal Academy for the Arts located in Rome and directed by Ciro Ferri from 1673 to 1986.

He was also sponsored in Rome by Agostino Chigi. From 1679 to 1680, Nasini completed over a dozen portraits of Chigi's family; some are copies of paintings by Jacob Ferdinand Voet and Alessandro Mattia da Farnese.

On October 15, 1680, his paintings of the Judgement of Solomon and Elias meets a child and widow was awarded second prize for design in the first class of painting at the Accademia di San Luca contest. In July 1681, he completed a St Peter of Alcantara for the church in the Villa Medicea L'Ambrogiana, near Montelupo Fiorentino

Nasini returned to Florence by 1685. During the reign of Cosimo III de' Medici, Nasini and Giuseppe Tonelli were commissioned to fresco an Allegory of the moral and religious virtues of the Medici for the ceiling of the gallery of the Uffizi that overlooks the river Arno.

In 1691, he completed frescoes for the Compagnia di San Luca (painter's guild) in the church of Carmine in Florence, and two ceilings in the Palazzo Medici Riccardi depicting Jove unleashes thunderbolts and Hercules and Giants. He also frescoes for the Landi Chapel in the church of the Carmine. He painted a fresco of the Allegory of Reason (1694) for the palazzo Tolomei-Biffi in Florence.

In 1720, he returned to Rome, where he painted in the church of the Santi Apostoli, the Quirinal Palace, and one of the nave paintings in San Giovanni in Laterano. In Foligno, he painted a San Leonardo for the church of the Madonna del Pianto. For the Chapel of the Madonna inside the church of Santa Maria della Scala of Siena, along with his son Apollonio, he painted a series of paintings consisting of large canvases portraying scenes from the Life of the Virgin, including the Birth of the Virgin, the Presentation in the Temple, and the Flight into Egypt, as well as frescoes depicting the Coronation of the Virgin and the Virgin crowned by the Trinity with angels upholding instruments of the Passion. Giuseppe's brother, Antonio Nasini and son Apollonio Nasini were also painters.

Appollonio and his father helped fresco the ceiling of the small oratory of San Gaetano di Thiene, Siena.

He died in Siena, aged 79.

== Gallery ==
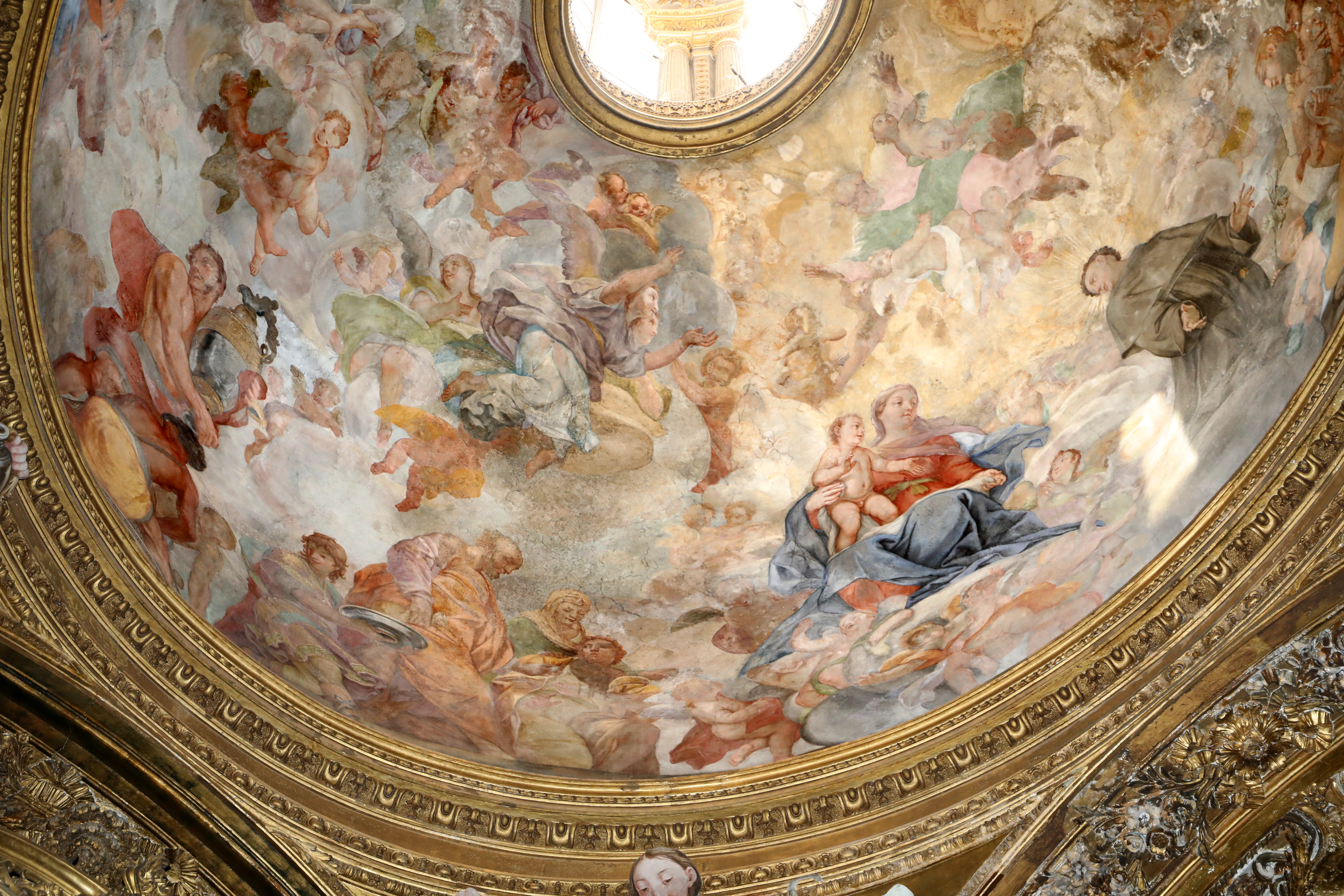
Glory of Saint Anthony of Padua

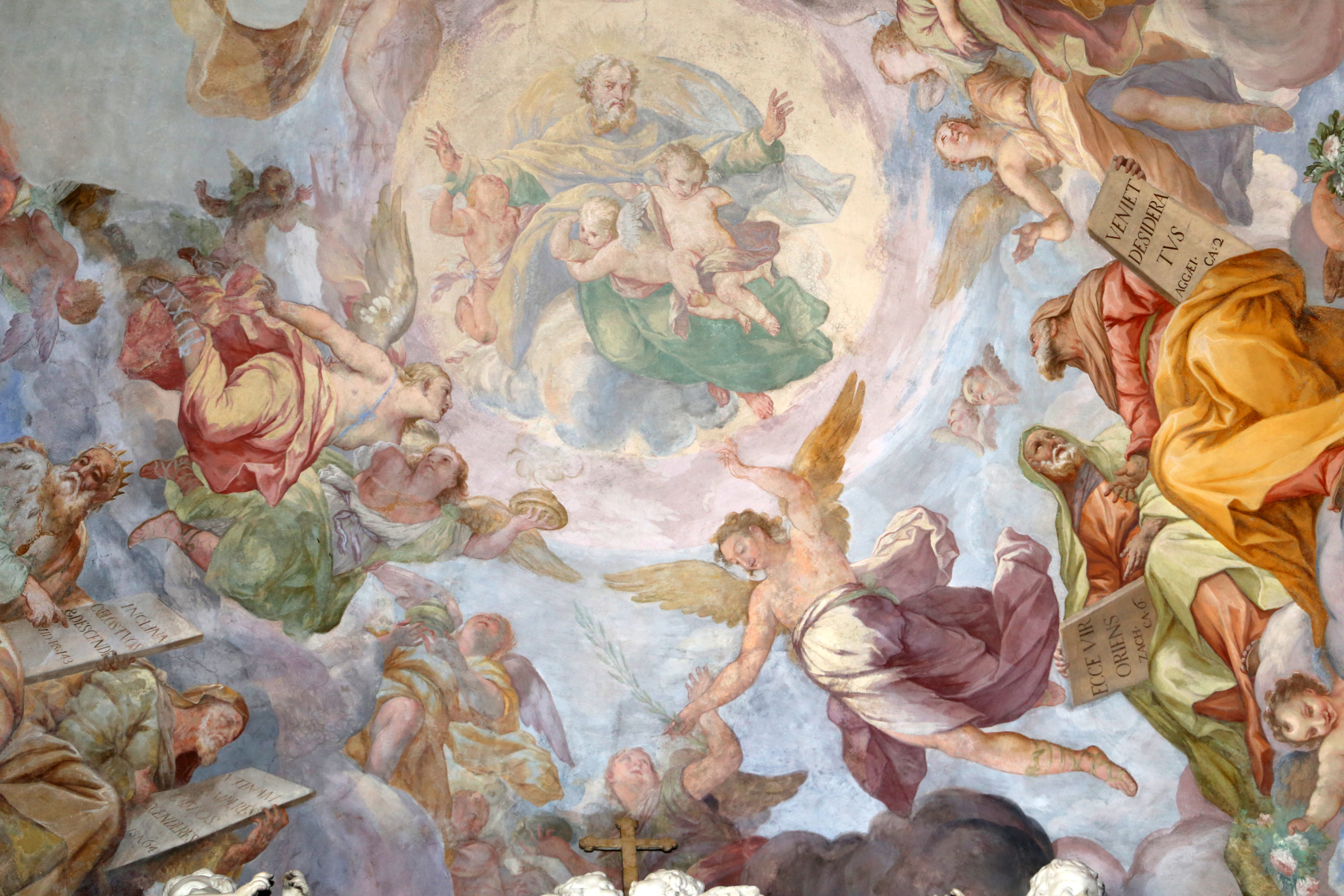
Scene from the Cellesi chapel

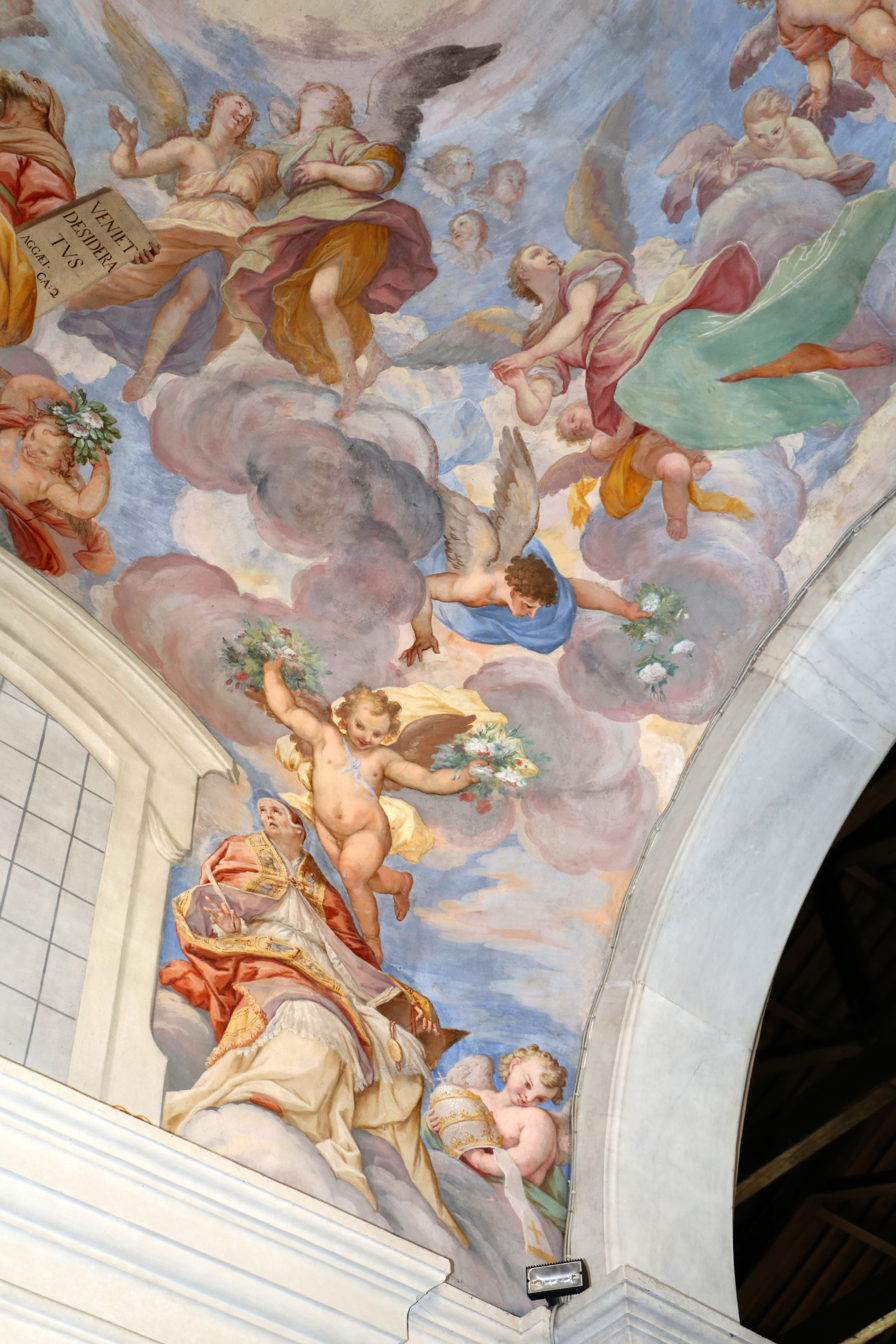
Another scene from the Cellesi chapel

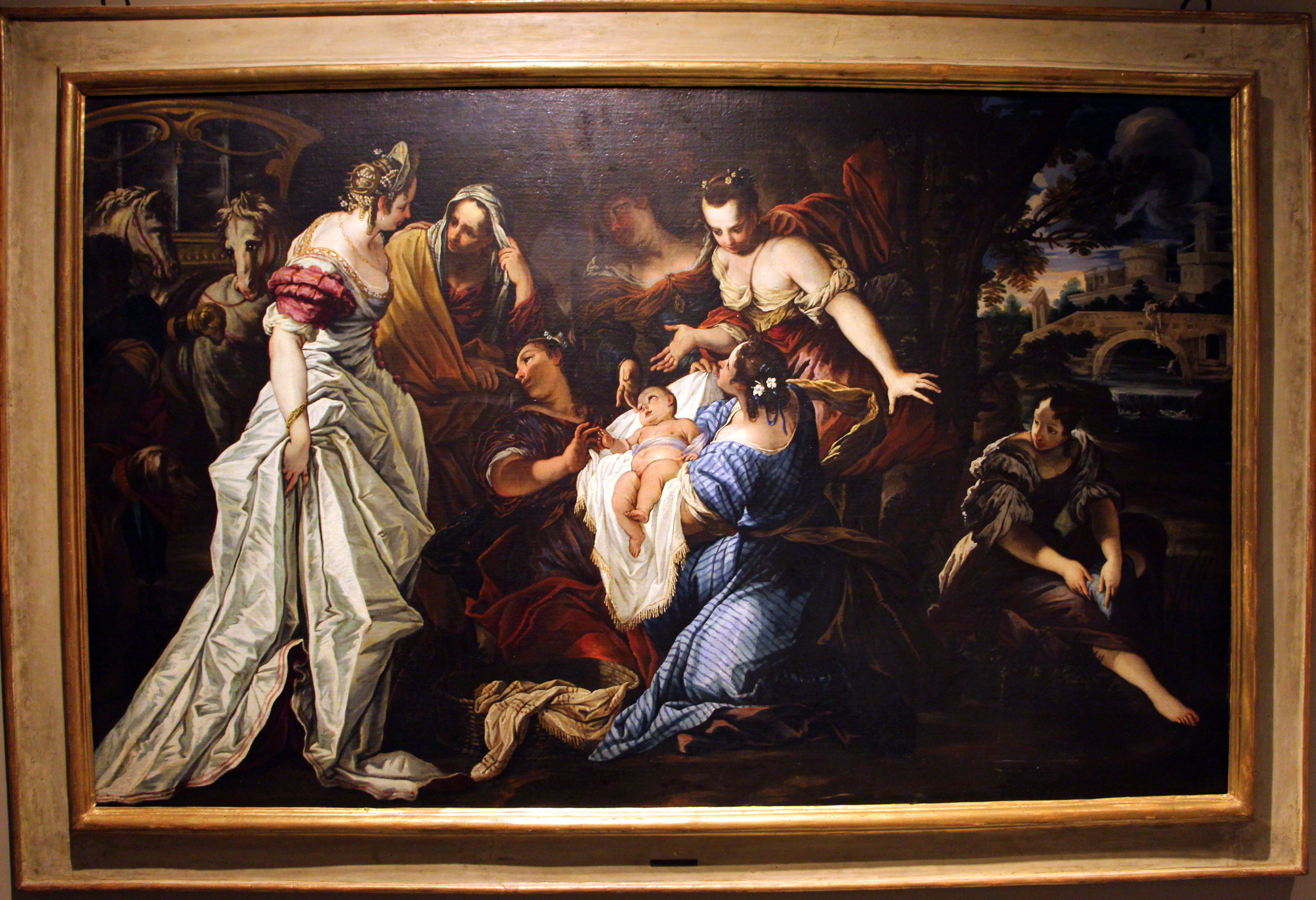
The Finding of Moses
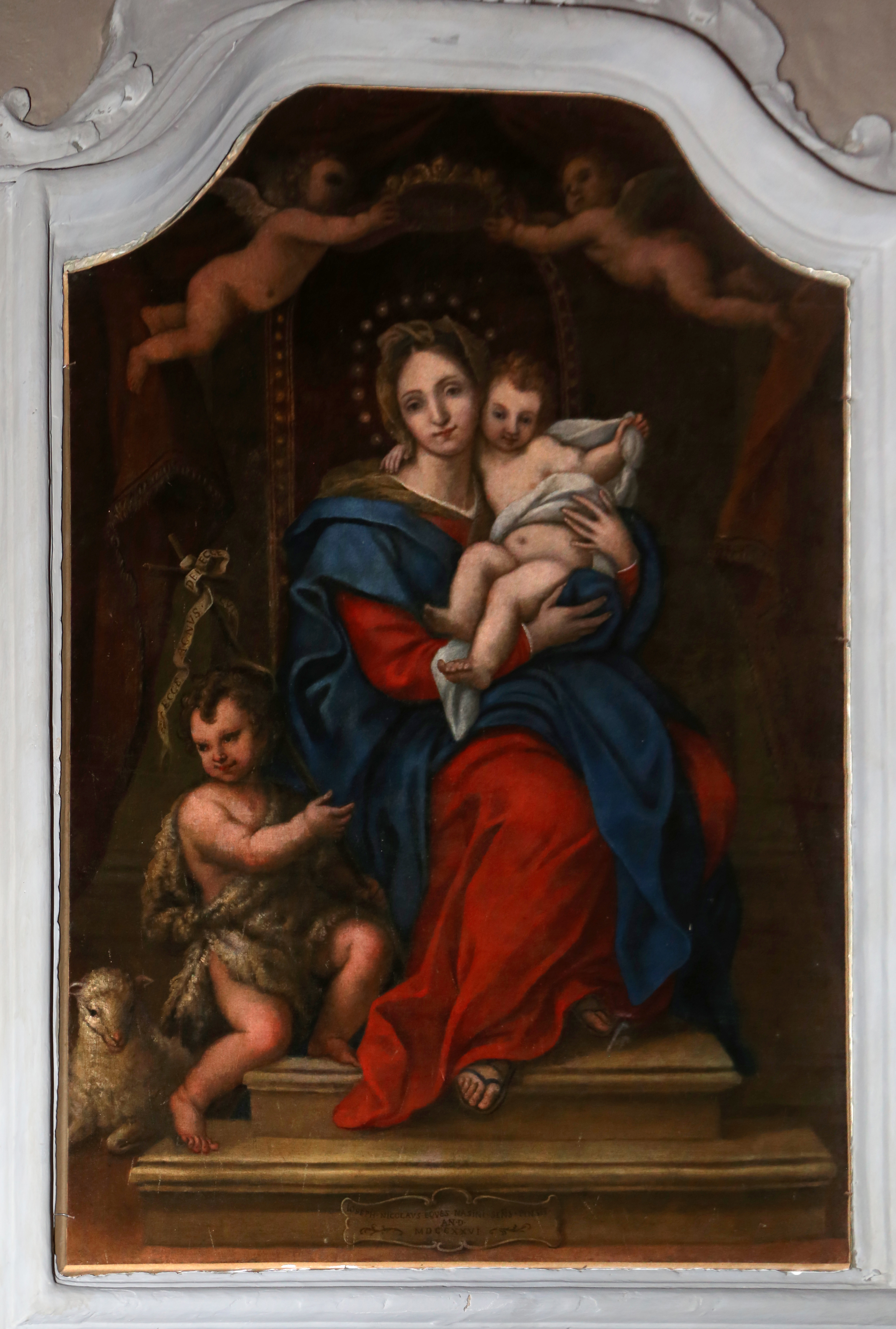
Our Lady of Graces

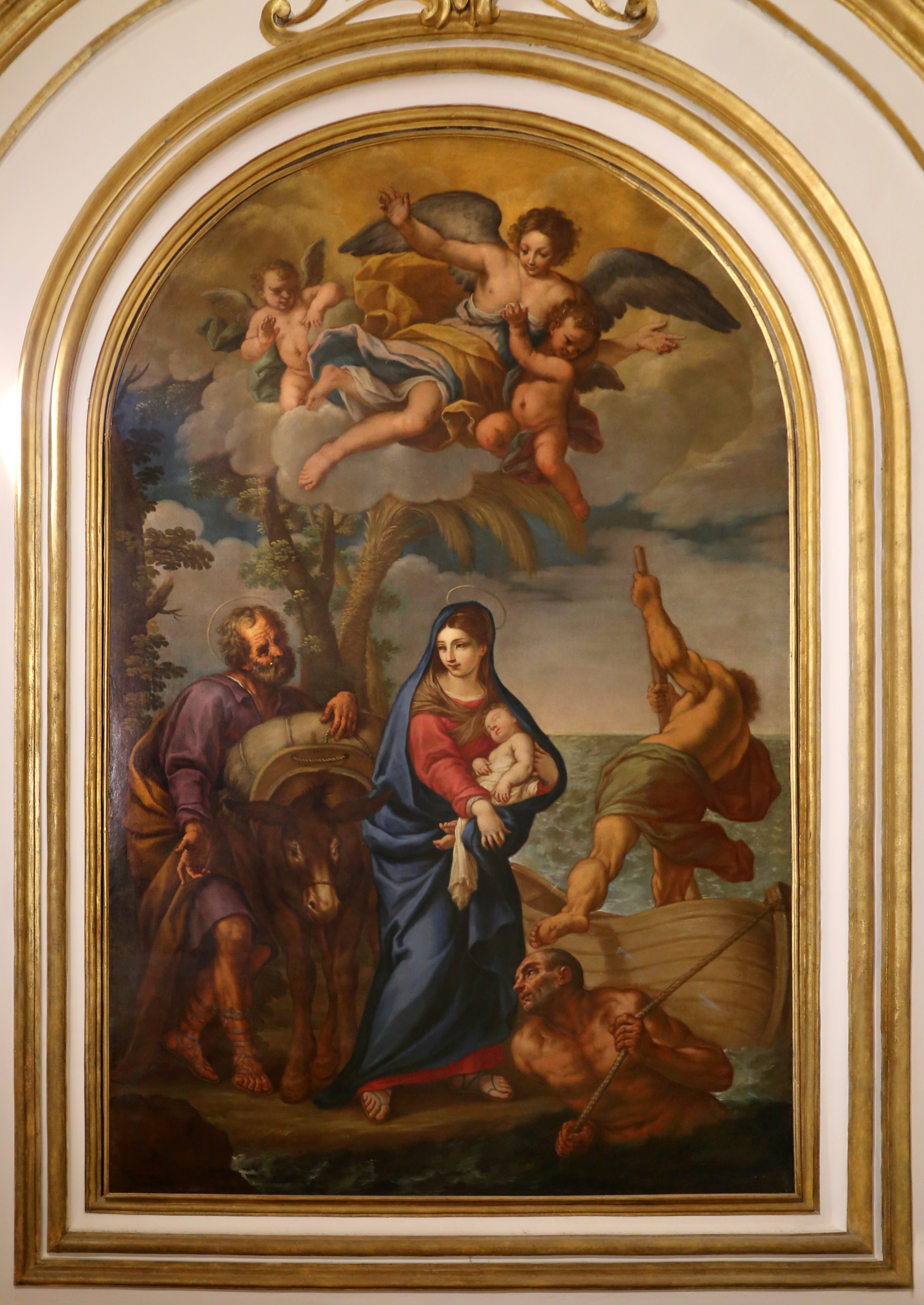
Flight into Egypt

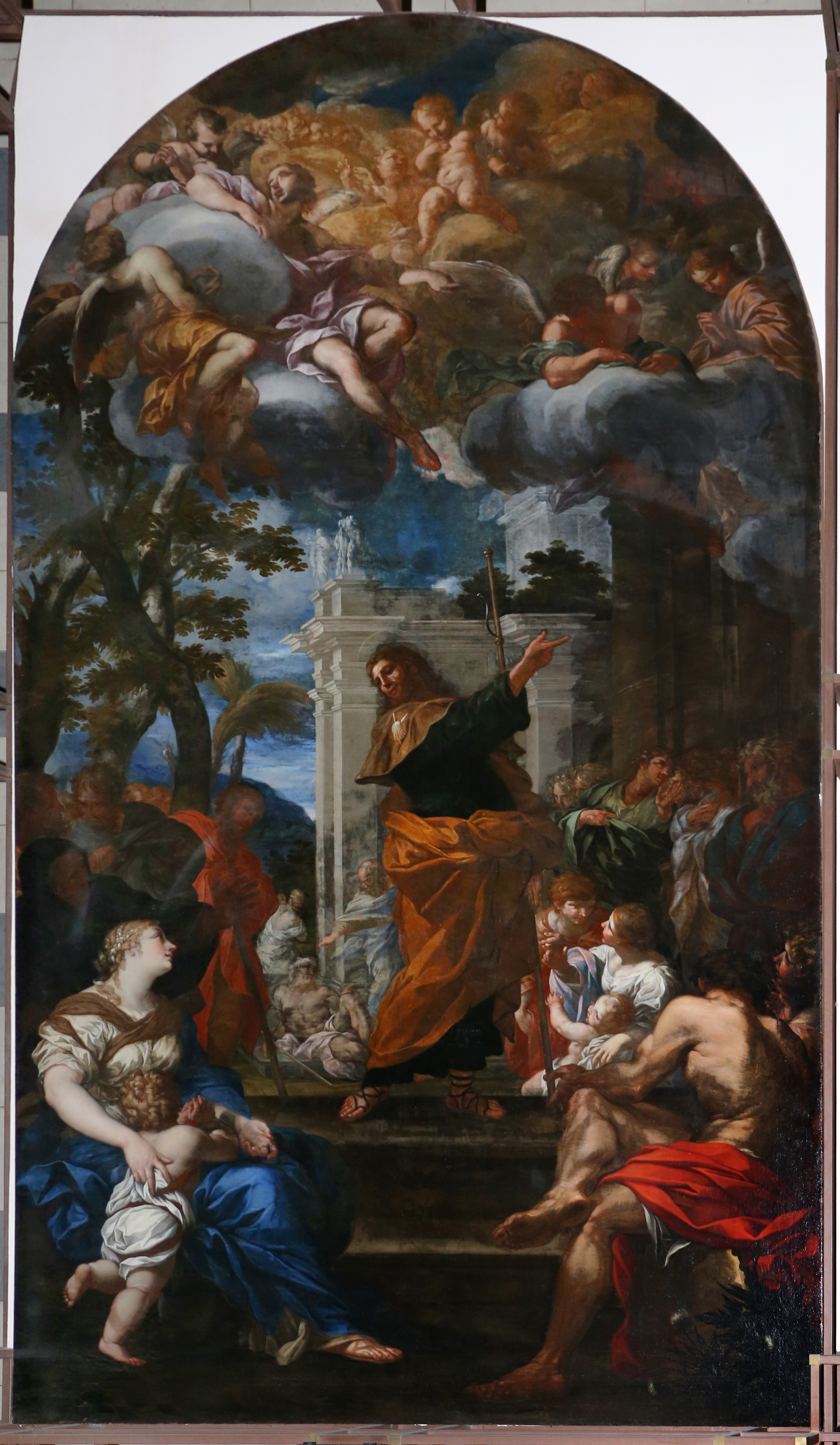
Sermon of San Jacopo

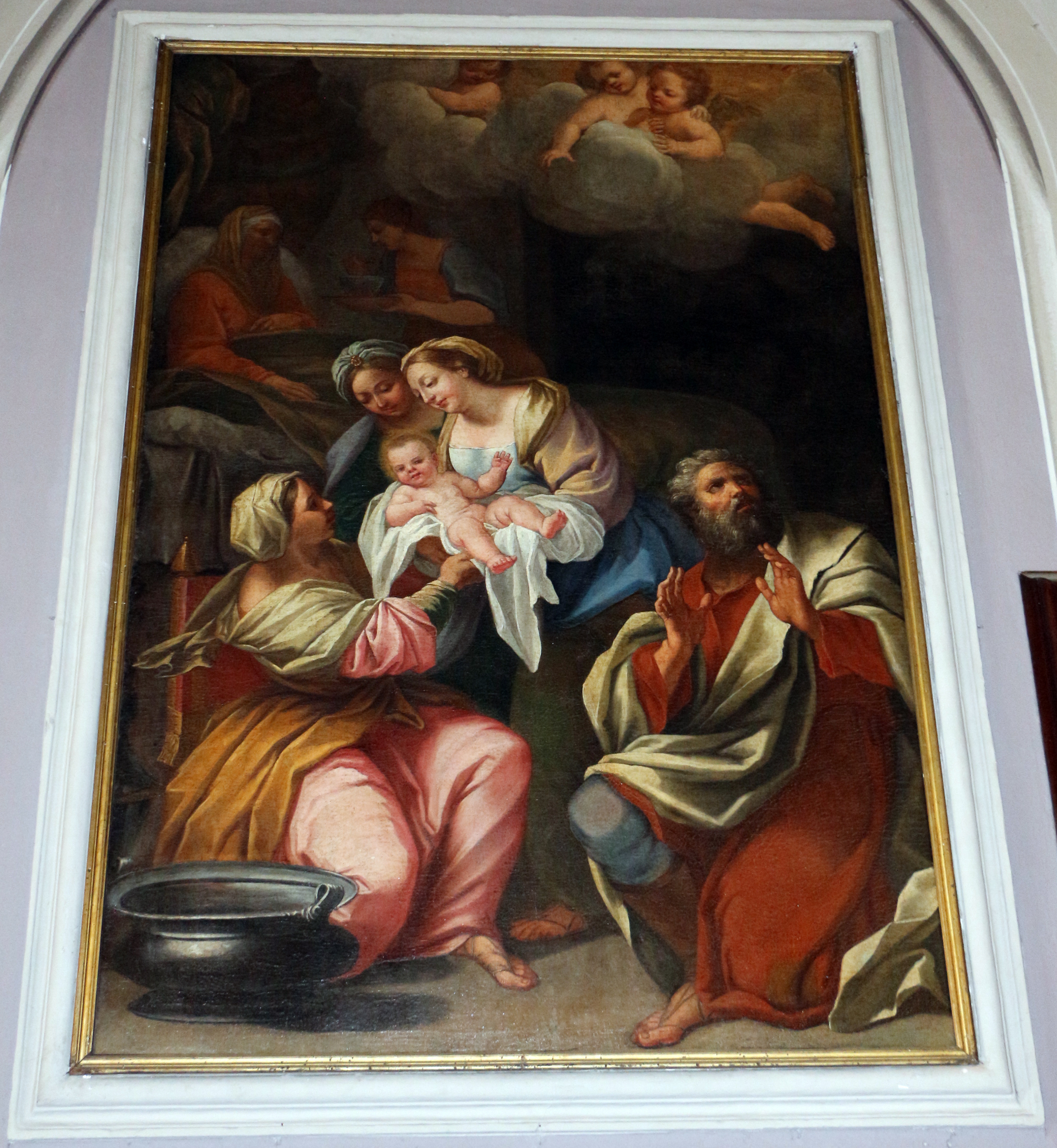
The Nativity of Mary

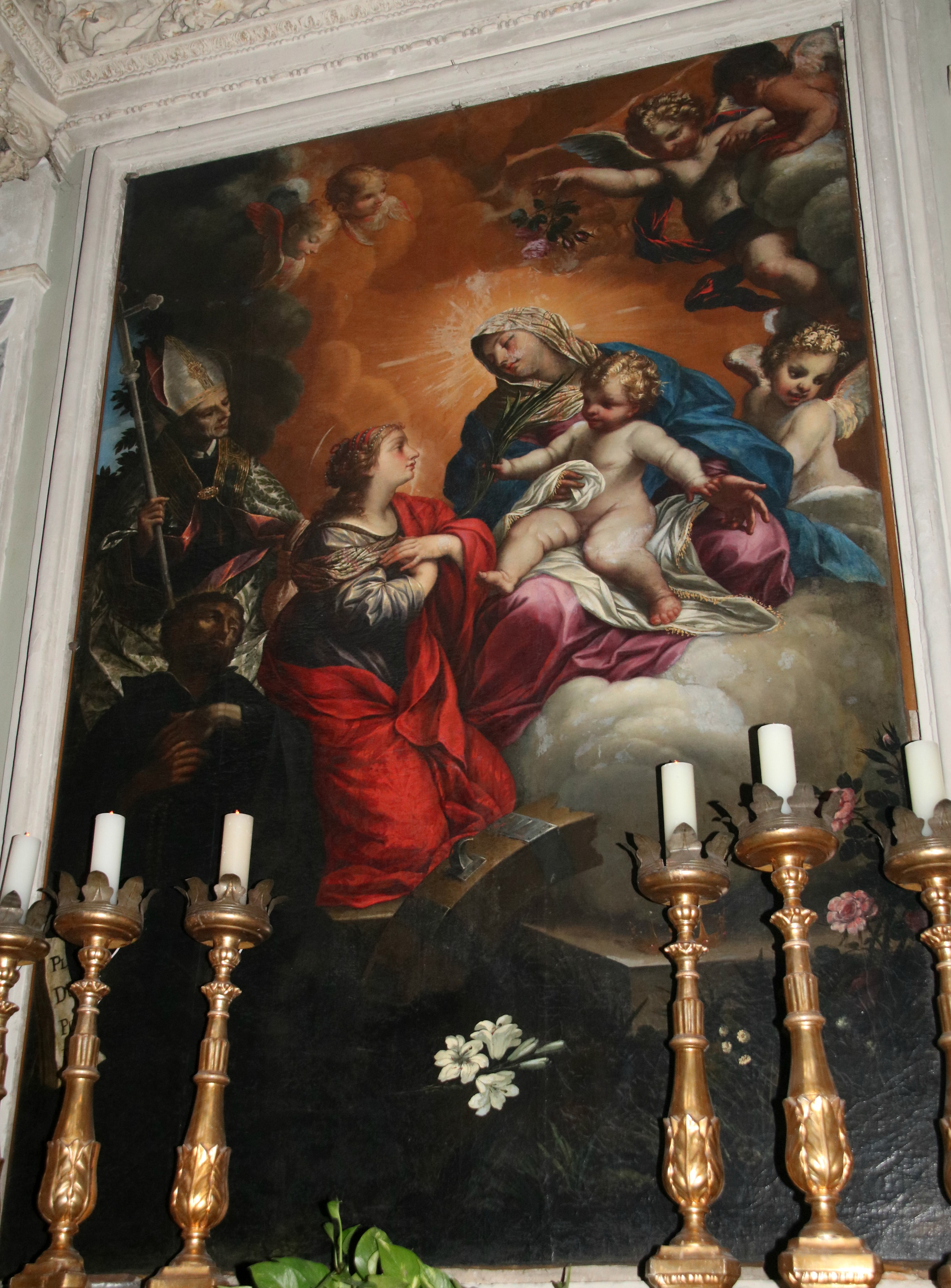
Apparition of the Madonna and Child to Saint Catherine of Alexandria and Saint Thomas of Villanova
