= San Gaetano di Thiene, Siena =

Church in Siena, Italy

Coordinates: 43.317805°N 11.338898°E

San Gaetano di Thiene
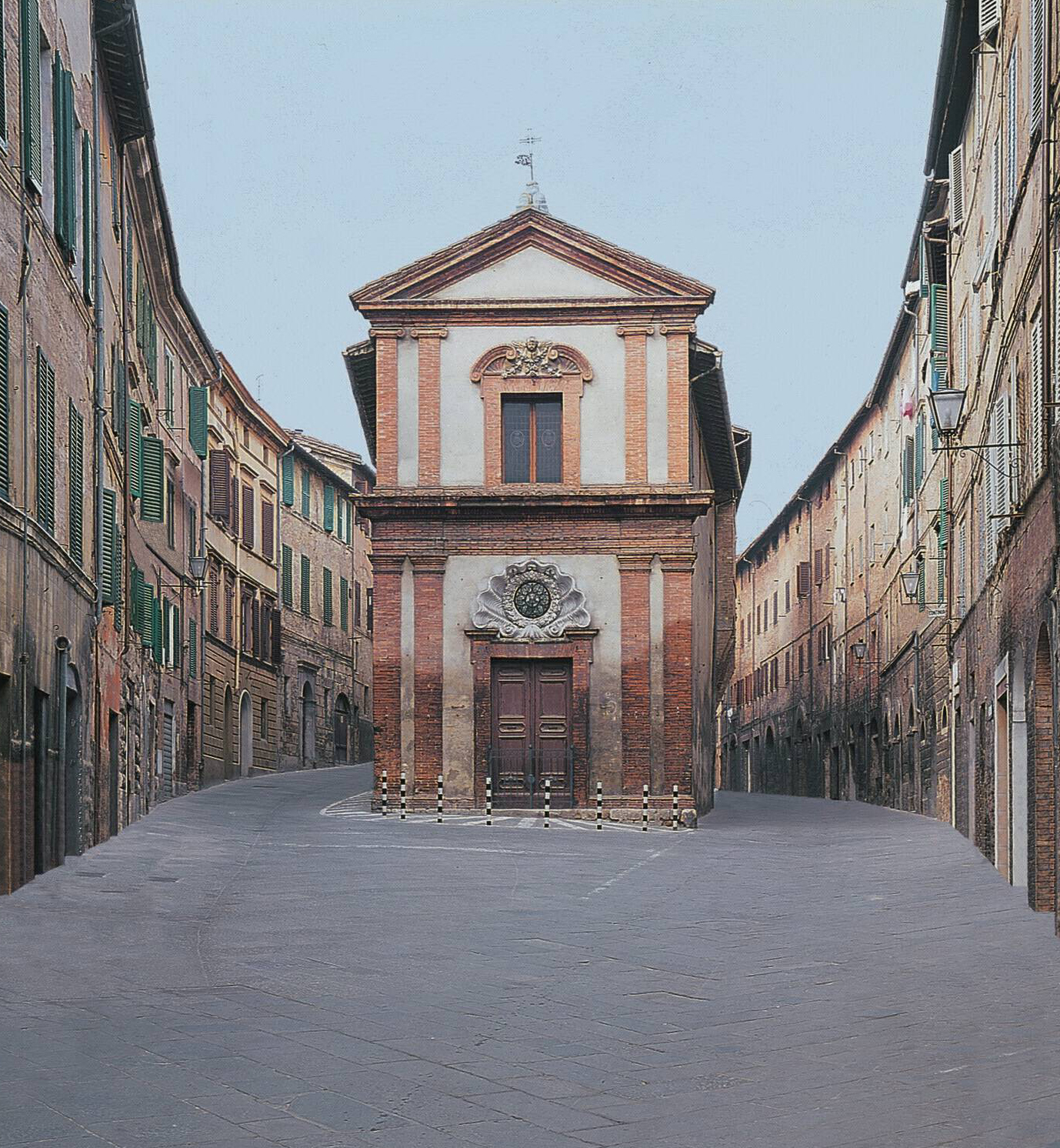

Religion
- Affiliation: Roman Catholic
- Ecclesiastical or organizational status: Archdiocesi of Siena-Colle di Val d'Elsa-Montalcino

Location
- Interactive map of San Gaetano di Thiene

Architecture
- Style: Gothic
- Groundbreaking: 1683
- Completed: 1700

The narrow church or oratory of San Gaetano di Thiene is found in the middle of via dei Pispini in Siena, Italy.

This oratory of the aristocratic Contrada del Nicchio (Sea-shell) was built from 1683 to 1700. The simple façade sports a large stucco seashell over the doorway. It houses a 14th-century painting depicting a Madonna and Child with Saints , which is likely the icon of Madonna del Forcone that had been previously venerated at an aedicule where the church stands.

Between 1686 and 1705, Giacomo Franchini added much of the internal stucco decoration, including statues of Blessed Ambrogio Sansedoni (first niche on left); the second niche and almost in conversation with the first is St Gaetano (Saint Cajetan); on the right are St Vincenzo Ferrer (flame over head) and Blessed Giovanni Colombini with a crucifix in left hand. Next to altar are Saints Bernardino and Caterina of Siena. The ceiling was frescoed with the Theological virtues by Giuseppe Nasini and his pupil Stefano di Francesco Marzi. The work was completed in 1734 by Apollonio Nasini using designs and help by father Giuseppe Nicola.
