= Castel del Piano =

- Comune
- Comune di Castel del Piano
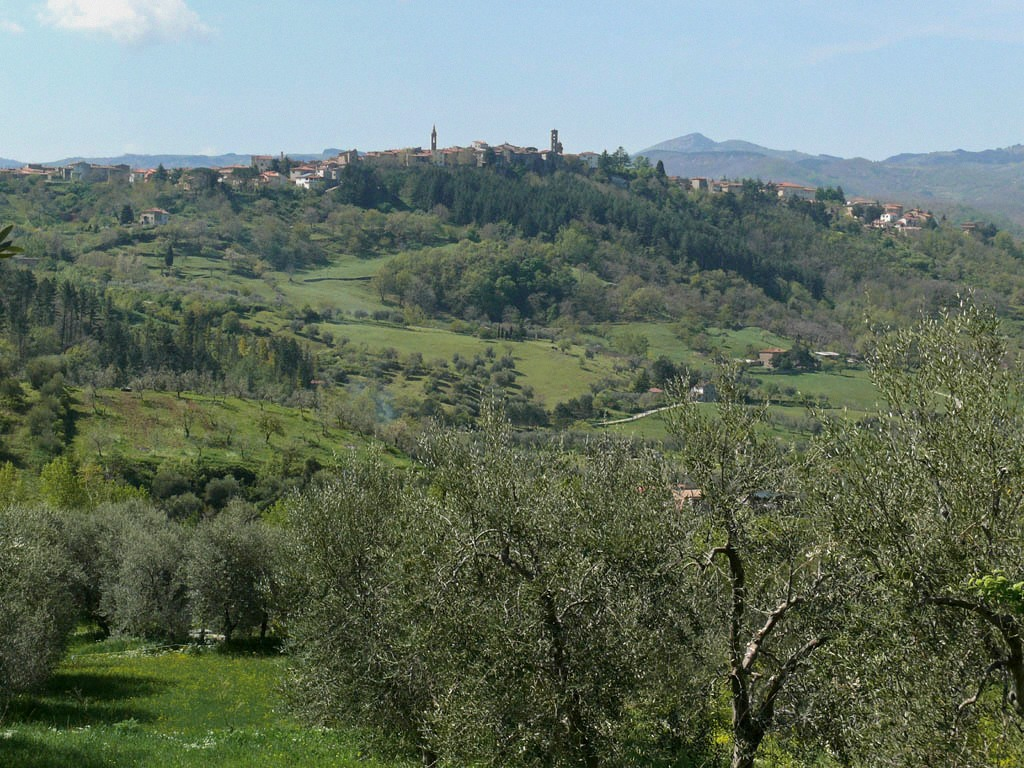

- Coat of arms

- Location within Italy Location within Tuscany
- Coordinates: 42°53′27″N 11°32′22″E
- Country: Italy
- Region: Tuscany
- Province: Grosseto (GR)
- Frazioni: Montegiovi, Montenero d'Orcia

Government
  - Mayor: Michele Bartalini

Area
  - Total: 67.77 km^{2} (26.17 sq mi)
- Elevation: 637 m (2,090 ft)

Population (31 May 2017)
  - Total: 4,814
  - Density: 71.03/km^{2} (184.0/sq mi)
- Demonym: Casteldelpianesi or Cioli
- Time zone: UTC+1 (CET)
  - Summer (DST): UTC+2 (CEST)
- Postal code: 58033
- Dialing code: 0564
- Patron saint: Maria Santissima delle Grazie
- Saint day: September 8
- Website: Official website

Castel del Piano is a town and comune (municipality) of Province of Grosseto in the region of Tuscany in central Italy.

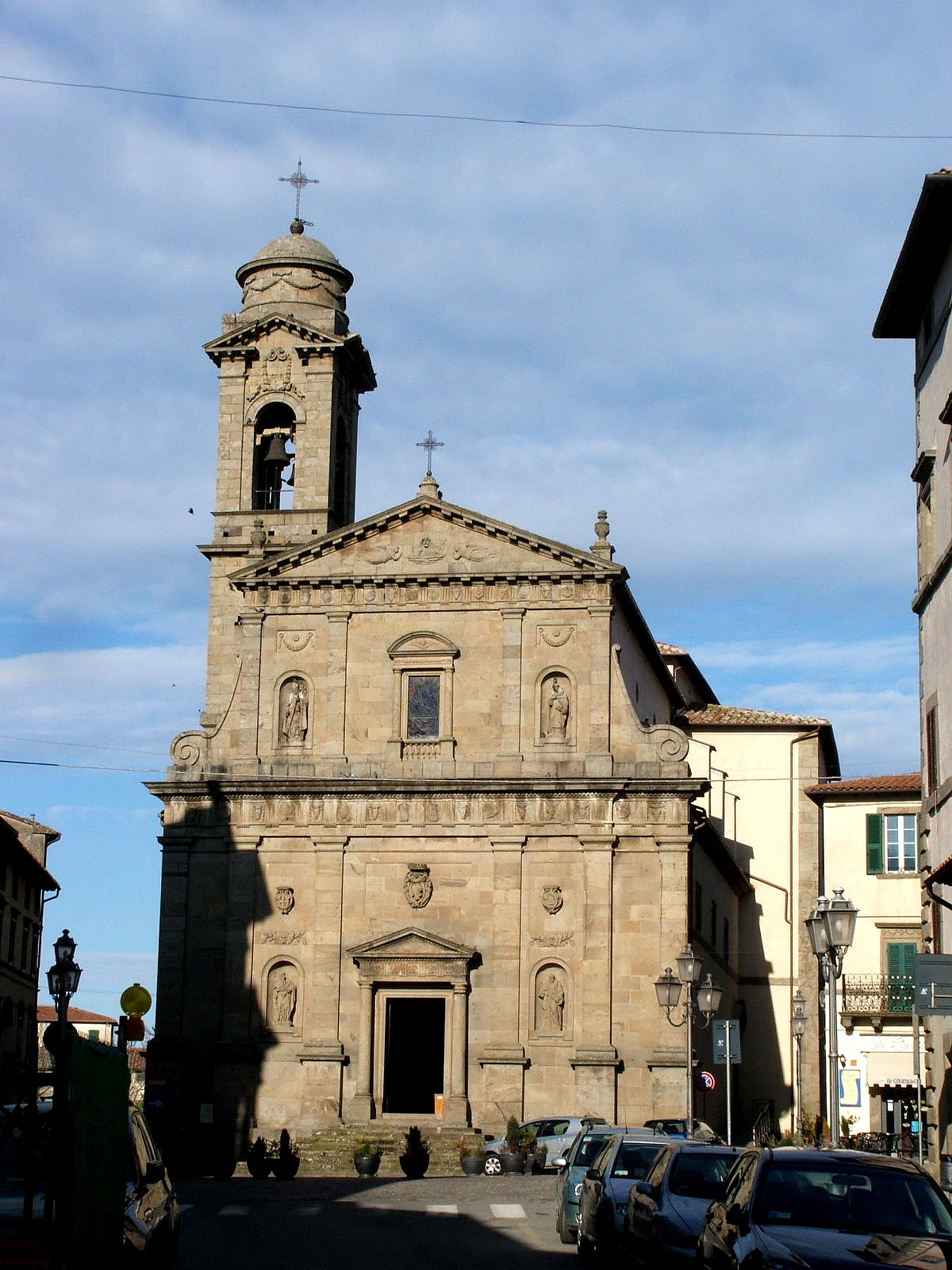
Chiesa della Propositura.

== History ==
The area of Castel del Piano is known to have been inhabited in prehistoric times, but the town itself is mentioned for the first time in a document from 890 AD. From 1175 to 1321 it was a possession of the Aldobrandeschi family. After the fall of the Republic of Siena, it became part of the Grand Duchy of Tuscany.

== Government ==
=== Frazioni ===
The municipality is formed by the municipal seat of Castel del Piano and the villages (frazioni) of Montegiovi and Montenero d'Orcia.

=== List of mayors ===
Mayor	Term start	Term end	Party
Alvaro Giannelli	1975	1985	Italian Communist Party
Elia Francesco Forti	1985	1995	Italian Socialist Party
Mario Rotellini	1995	1999	Italian People's Party
Franco Ulivieri	1999	2009	Democrats of the Left
Claudio Franci	2009	2019	Democratic Party
Michele Bartalini	2019	Incumbent	Civic

== Culture ==
The city is divided into four contrade (quarters) which take part in a palio held every 8 September. The palio was raced for the first time in 1402.

The contrade are:

- Borgo
- Monumento
- Poggio
- Storte

== Main sights ==
- Chiesa della Propositura (15th century). The church houses paintings by Giuseppe Nicola Nasini, Francesco Nasini, and Rutilio Manetti. The decorations on the facade were created by Giuseppe Domenico Felli in 1871. The bell tower was built in 1829 by Gaetano Baccani.
- Church of Santa Maria delle Grazie

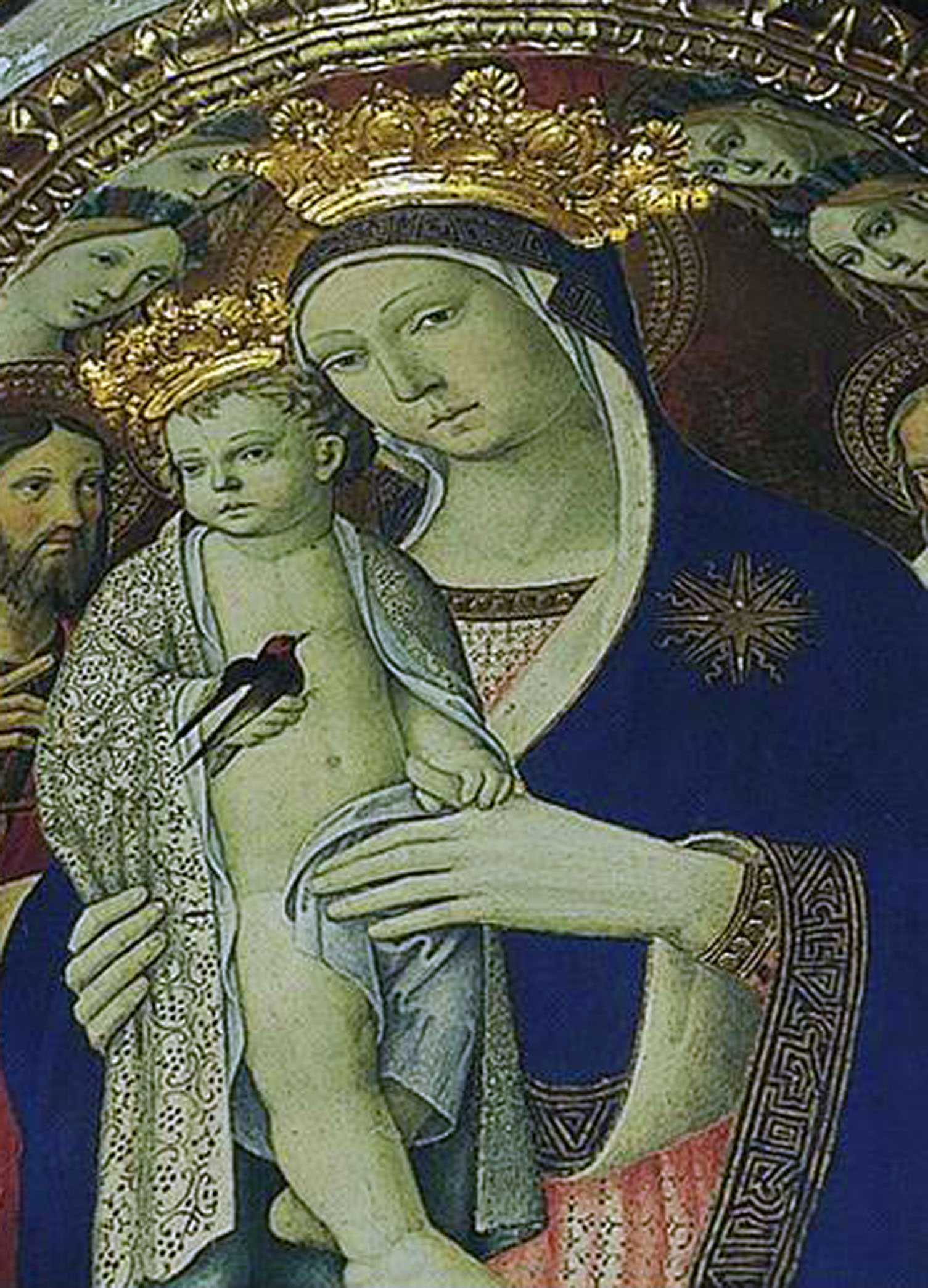
The Virgin Mary and Jesus in the church of Santa Maria delle Grazie.

== Notable people ==
- Giuseppe Nicola Nasini (1657–1736), Baroque painter
- Bernardino Caldaioli (1847–1907), Roman Catholic bishop
- Irzio Luigi Magliacani (1892–1976), Roman Catholic bishop and missionary
- Anna Rita Bramerini (born 1968), politician

== See also ==
- Monte Amiata
