= Francesco Nasini =

Italian painter

Francesco Nasini (Piancastagnaio, either 1611 or 1621– Castel del Piano, 1695) was an Italian painter of the Baroque period, active mainly in towns outside of Siena, Italy.

Francesco was the progenitor of a pedigree of painters. He had a brother, Antonio Annibale Nasini. Most famous of all the family was his son Giuseppe Nicola Nasini (1664-1736), who traveled to Rome and had widespread patronage. Francesco was also the father of Antonio Nasini (1631-1716), who like his father, was mainly active near Siena. Finally, Apollonio Nasini, son of Giuseppe, was also a painter of some distinction.

Francesco was very prolific in the province of Siena. In an inventory of works of art in Siena, many works are listed by specific members of the family, or attributed to the family. For example, in the right chapel of the church of the Madonna del Rimedii, were frescoes, in poor condition, of Saints Cecilia, Agnese, Margherita, Barbara, Rocco, and Agustine (1700). In a chapel on the left, were frescoes of Saints Agatha, Lucia, Appollonia, Orsola, Anthony of Padua, and Gaetano (Cajetan). The ceiling had a Glory of St Anthony painted in 1694. In the suppressed church of St Mark linked to a suppressed monastery were frescoes of Saints John the Baptist and St Bernard Abbot, Saints Michael and Raphael Archangel, plus other frescoes in the chapels including an Annunciacion, Visitation, and frescoes of the Evangelists and the holy father, and Saints. In San Francesco presso Asciano, there was an altarpiece of the Crucifixion completed in 1664. Francesco also painted frescoes of the Last Supper in the refectory of the convent of the Carmine. He also painted an altarpiece for the church of San Pietro alla Magione

== Works ==
Grosseto: Frescoes in chapel of Church of San Antonio di San Francesco.

Grotte di Castro: Altarpiece of Madonna of Rosary and mysteries, Basilica of San Giovanni Battista.

Arcidosso: Frescoes of Saints and Martyrs, Church of the Misericordia.

Castelnuovo Berardenga: Holy Family, Church of Santi Giusto e Clemente.

Roccalbegna: Chiesa dei Santi Pietro e Paolo and Collection of the Oratorio del SS. Crocifisso.

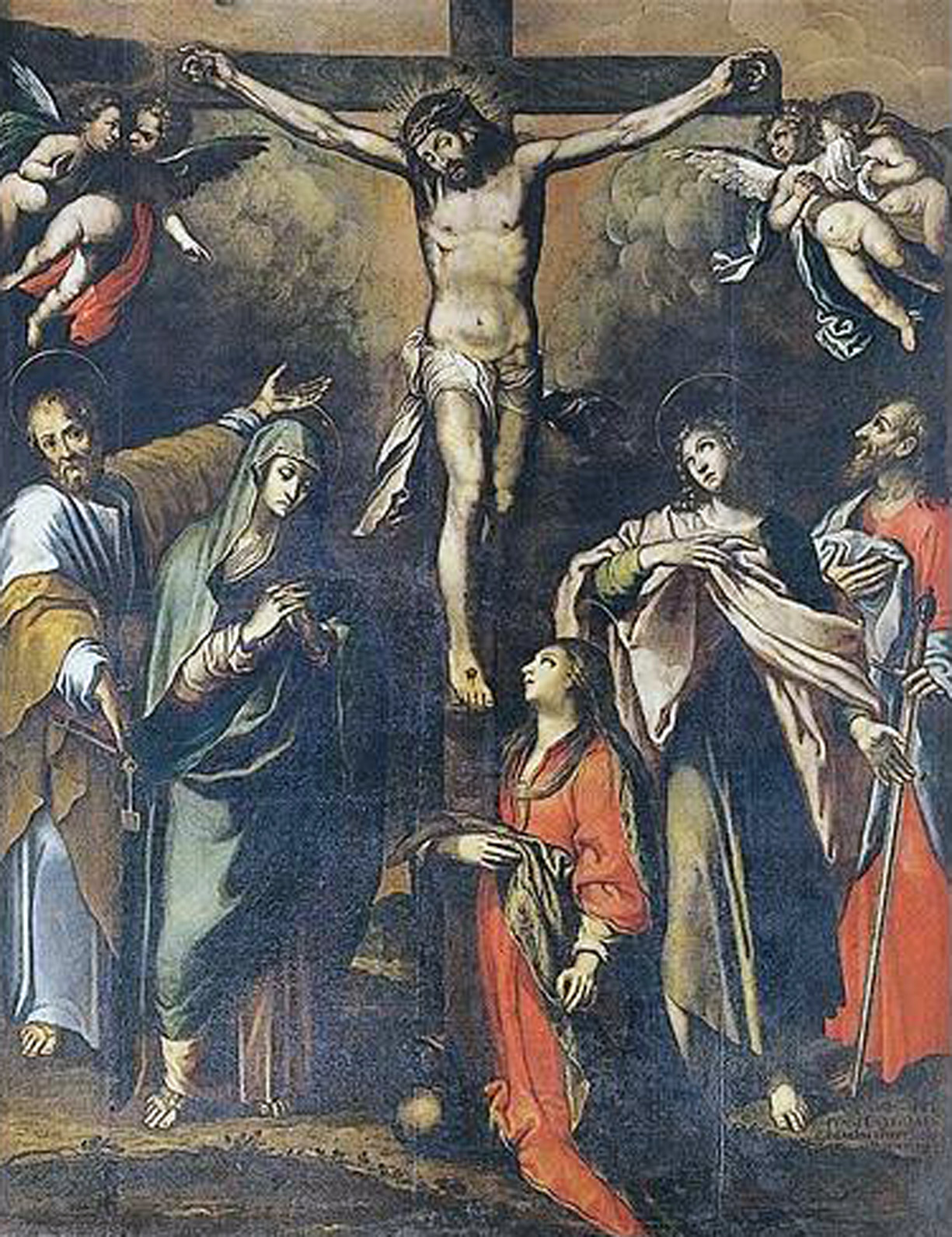
Crucifixión in Roccalbegna.

  - Madonna del Carmine with Saints Cristopher and Jacob
  - Crucifixion, Ecce Homo, and Christ Risen.
  - Madonna with child.
  - St Nicolas of Bari, St Anthony of Padua, and the child Jesus

Castel del Piano:

- Madonna of the Carmine y Ginanneschi, Church of Madonna delle Grazie.
- Discovery of the True Cross, Church of SS. Sacramento.
- Marriage of the Virgin (1664), Church of San Giuseppe.

Abbadia San Salvatore:

- Martyrdom of St Bartholomew.
- Life of the Virgin (1653-1659).
- Legend of King Ratchis (1652-1653).
- Nativity.
- Frescoes in rectory with brother Antonio Annibale Nasini.

== Gallery ==
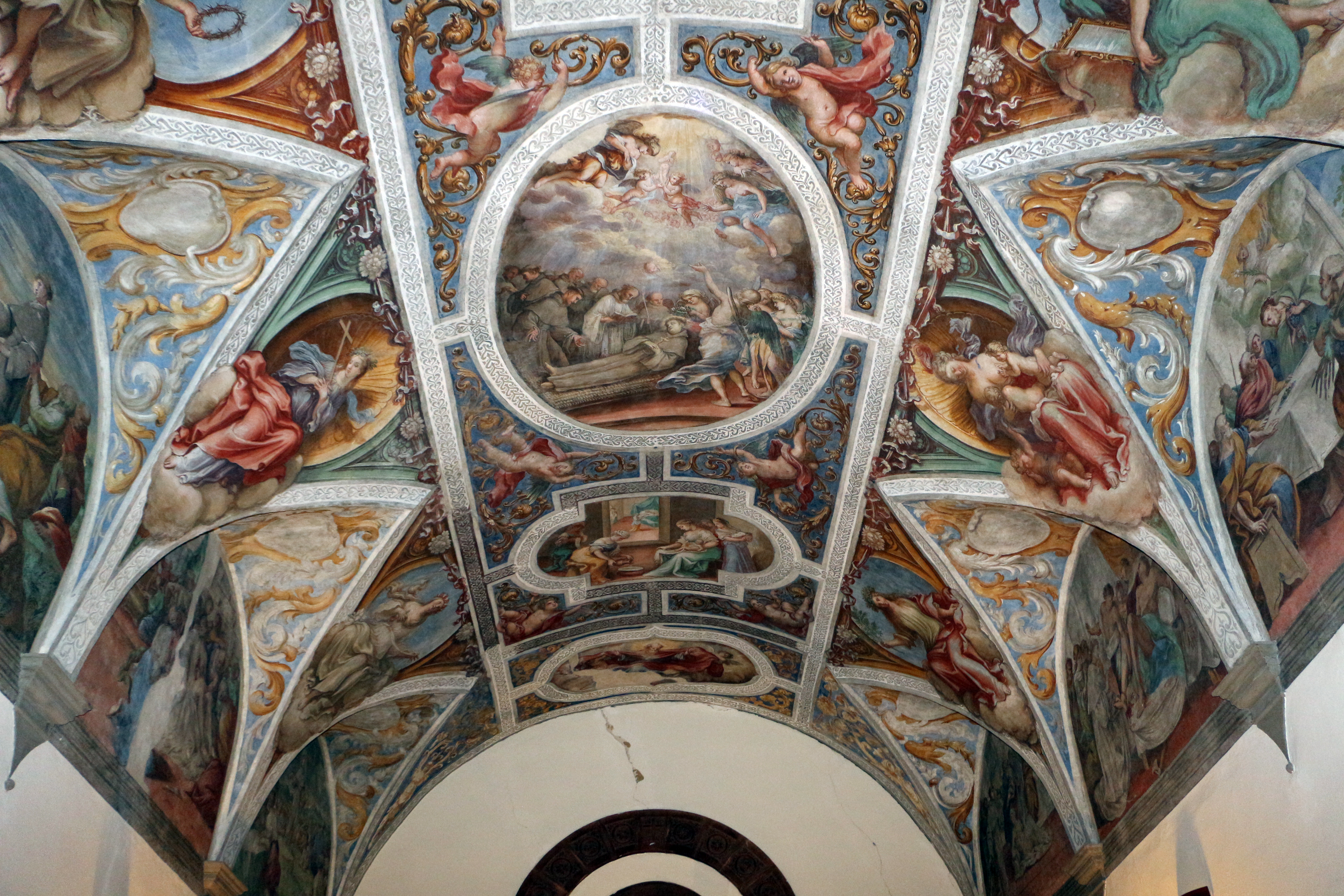
Frescos in Grosseto.

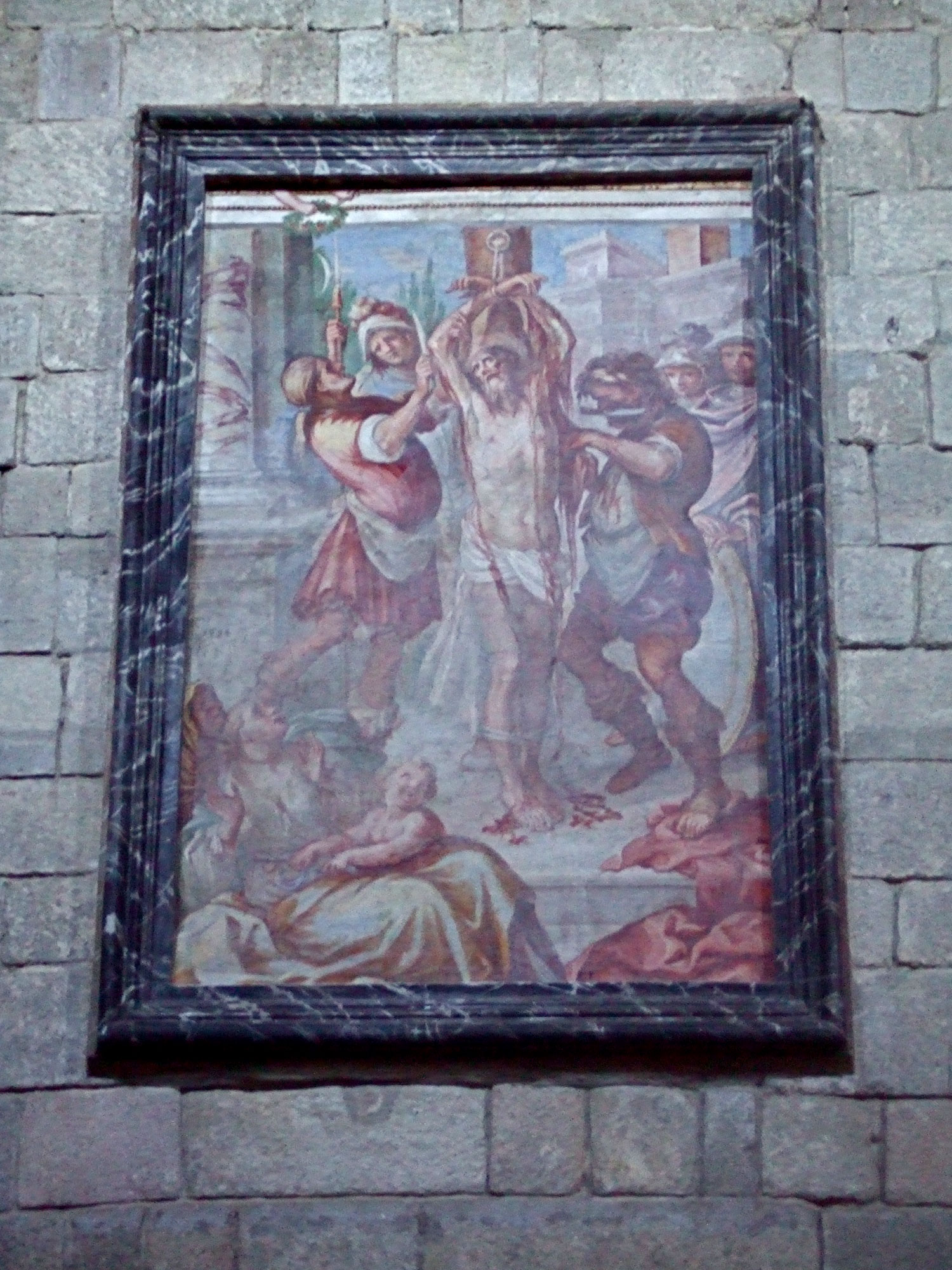
Martyrdom of St Bartholemew, Abbey San Salvatore.
