= Zancona (river) =

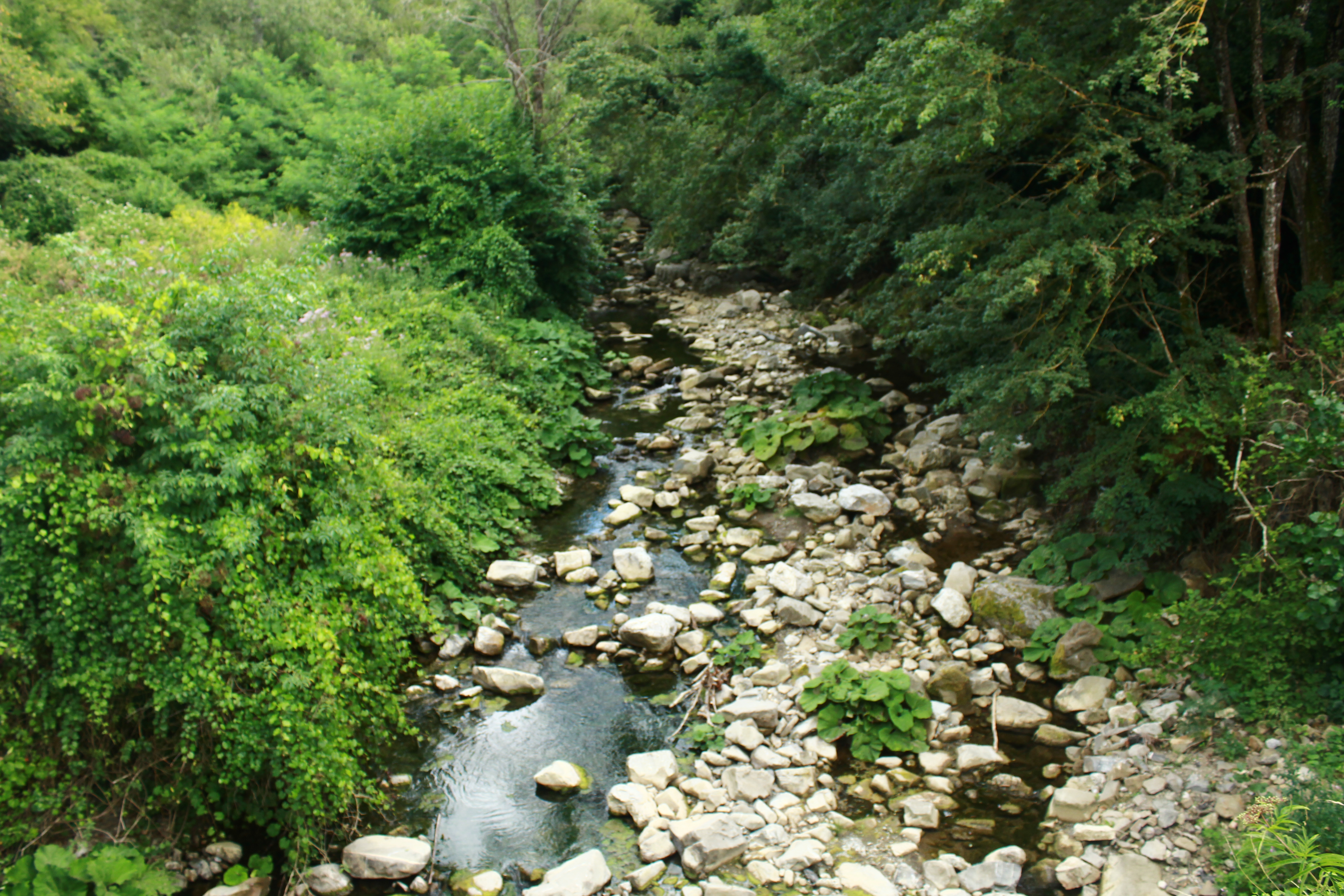

Location
- Country: Italy
- Region: Tuscany
- Municipalities: Arcidosso, Castel del Piano, Cinigiano, Seggiano

Physical characteristics
- Source: Monte Labbro
  - location: Arcidosso, Tuscany, Italy
  - coordinates: 42°49′19″N 11°31′23″E
  - elevation: approx. 650 m
- Mouth: Ente
  - location: Montegiovi, Tuscany, Italy
  - coordinates: 42°55′47″N 11°31′11″E
  - elevation: approx. 300 m
- Length: 10 km
- Basin size: approx. 25 km²

Basin features
- Progression: Ente → Orcia → Ombrone → Tyrrhenian Sea

The Zancona is a river or creek in southern Tuscany, Italy. It rises within the Monte Labbro Nature Reserve, on the western slopes of Mount Amiata, and flows northwards for about 10 kilometres before joining the Ente, a tributary of the Orcia River.

The watercourse descends from elevations of around 650 metres above sea level, draining the northern slopes of Monte Labbro and the adjacent Amiata reliefs, and crosses the territories of Arcidosso, Castel del Piano, Cinigiano, and Seggiano. It passes through the villages of Le Macchie and Zancona, runs between Poggio di Roveta and Arcidosso, skirts Montelaterone to the west, and continues north with Monticello Amiata on its left bank. Near Montegiovi, it joins the Vivo, and together they flow into the Ente at an elevation of approximately 300 metres.

The Zancona drains a catchment area of about 25 square kilometres. Its stream bed is predominantly pebbly, with sections of sand and large boulders, and the water is generally clear. Riparian vegetation is typical of coppice woodland, with exposed roots and fallen trunks occasionally interrupting the current. The stream is locally known for freshwater fishing, particularly for trout and barbel.

Archaeological remains discovered along its course include finds from the 4th century BC and a 3rd–2nd century BC necropolis, consisting of cremation burials with sandstone urns and cinerary vessels bearing Etruscan inscriptions, attesting to early Etruscan settlement in the valley.
