= Isidoro Maggi =

Member of the Chamber of Deputies
- In office 6 August 1876 – 13 December 1876
- Constituency: Scansano
- In office 22 November 1882 – 11 August 1884
- Constituency: Grosseto

Personal details
- Born: 24 March 1840 Arcidosso, Grand Duchy of Tuscany
- Died: 11 August 1884 (aged 44) Arcidosso, Kingdom of Italy
- Occupation: Lawyer, entrepreneur

Isidoro Maggi (24 March 1840 – 11 August 1884) was an Italian lawyer, entrepreneur, and politician who served as a member of the Chamber of Deputies of the Kingdom of Italy during the 12th, 13th, and 15th legislatures.

== Life and career ==
Maggi graduated in law from the University of Pisa. He practised as a lawyer first in Turin, in the office of Angelo Brofferio, and later in Rome. He was also active in journalism and business. As a lawyer, he became known for defending the Jurisdavidists during the Siena trial of 1879.

Maggi engaged in industrial entrepreneurship, particularly in the exploitation of mineral pigments and in wool processing. A notable example was the wool mill at Bagnoli, near Arcidosso, which used the water power of the Acqua d'Alto waterfall.

Maggi first stood for election to the Chamber of Deputies in 1874, obtaining 14.50% of the vote in the constituency of Scansano and failing to be elected. The elected candidate, Domenico Tonarelli, was appointed prefect in June 1876, and a by-election was held on 6 August 1876. Maggi won the seat with 62.68% of the vote, defeating Antonio De Witt.

At the subsequent general election in November 1876, Maggi was again elected; however, his election was annulled on 13 December 1876 due to formal irregularities. In the by-election held on 14 January 1877, he obtained 47.88% of the vote and was defeated by De Witt. Maggi stood again in the 1880 general election but was once more defeated by De Witt.

He later returned to Parliament, representing the constituency of Grosseto during the 15th legislature (1882–1884).

Maggi died in office on 11 August 1884 in his hometown.

== Sources ==
- Storia dei collegi elettorali 1848–1897. Parte II. Rome: Ministero dell'agricoltura, industria e commercio. 1898. pp. 308, 610.
- Di Salvo, Salvatore (July 2013). "Deputati dell'Ottocento grossetano. Isidoro Maggi e Telemaco Ferrini". Amiata. Storia e territorio. Vol. 26, no. 71. pp. 43–53.
- Niccolai, Lucio (2008). L'odore della terra. Biografie di uomini e donne che hanno fatto la Maremma dalla montagna al mare. Arcidosso: Effigi. p. 178.
