= Jurisdavidism =

Jurisdavidism (Italian: Giurisdavidismo) was a religious movement founded by the Italian preacher Davide Lazzaretti in the 1870s, and officially active until 2002.

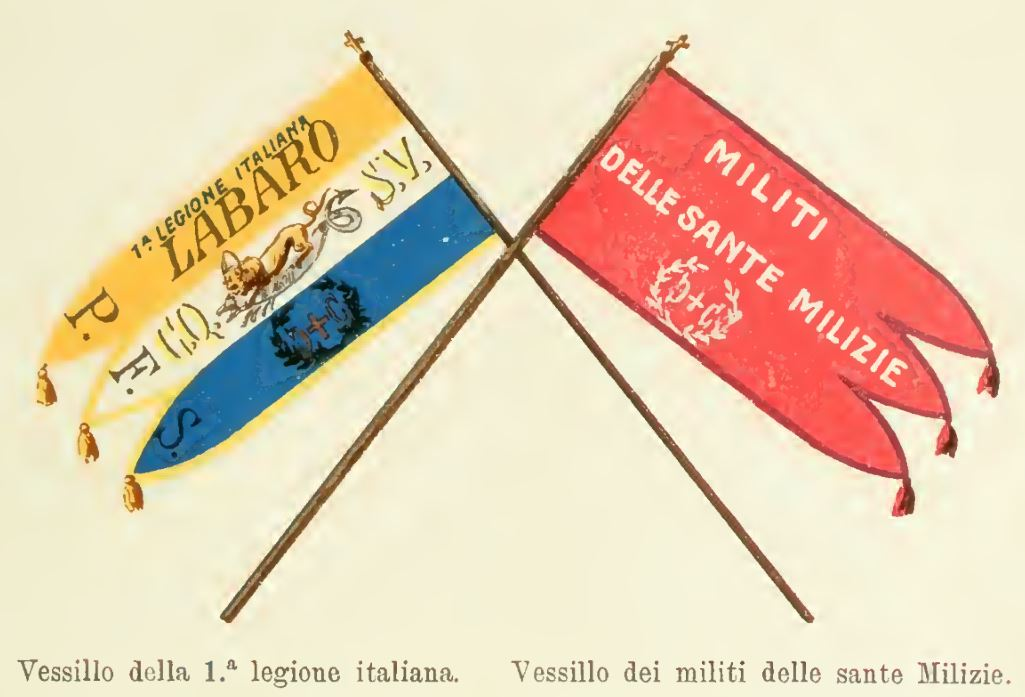
Flags used by Jurisdavidics

== History ==
The movement was born at the behest of Davide Lazzaretti of Arcidosso, a carter of humble origins, who, after some prophetic visions, began in his hometown and in the small villages of Monte Labbro (Zancona, Macchie, Rondinelli) to gather disciples and proselytes with the common aim of reforming Catholic religiosity, in direct relation with the social issues, in view of a new era of Christianity. According to Jurisdavidic theology, human history was to be divided into three eras, called 'laws' (leggi): the 'law of justice' (legge di giustizia), whose bearer is Moses; the 'law of grace' (legge di grazia), whose bearer is Jesus Christ; and the 'law of right' (legge di diritto), whose bearer is Lazzaretti himself. The Catholic Church, with the papacy seen as an institution far removed from mankind, was to be reformed, and the Jurisdavidic Church proposed itself as the bearer of new messages: the abolition of the celibacy of priests, the end of Roman rites, the wicked in Hell only temporarily, and finally saved. In the 1870s, Davide Lazzaretti founded three significant religious institutes: the Holy League, also known as the Christian Brotherhood (1870), with charitable aims; the Institute of Penitential and Penitent Hermits (1871), a strictly religious organisation, imbued with the millenarian and messianic spirit; and the Society of Christian Families (1872), the most important of the institutions from a social point of view, aiming to build a community in which its adherents would work and pool their goods according to the original primitive spirit of the Christian churches. Particular importance should be given to the system of electing the community's governing bodies: Davide instituted universal suffrage, with the vote extended to women, when this was still a distant thought in Italy and the rest of Europe. The institutions constituted an attempt to anticipate aspects of a broad eschatological vision, in the fulfilment of the divine will (the three institutions symbolically represent the three theological virtues: charity, faith and hope respectively) that would lead to the beginning of the new era.

After 1878, the year in which Davide Lazzaretti, by then branded as a subversive, was killed by the soldiers of the Royal Italian Army near Arcidosso during a peaceful procession, behind which an atypical collaboration between the State and the Church institution was concealed, Lazzaretti's followers continued his work and the dissemination of his thought. In 2002, with the death of the last high priest, Turpino Chiappini, the official Jurisdavidic Church put an end to its history. However, a few elderly practitioners in the Monte Labbro area survive, while since 1978 the David Lazzaretti Study Centre has been active in Arcidosso, dedicated to the study, collection and dissemination of material concerning Lazzaretti and his religious movement. At the hamlet of Zancona, a village indissolubly linked in its history to the story of Davide, the followers' archive is preserved.

It is worth mentioning that a small religious reality, inspired by the figure of Davide Lazzaretti, survives in Rome, where Elena Cappelli (1867–1953), wife of the high priest Filippo Imperiuzzi, reworked the Jurisdavidic message by uniting it with elements derived from esotericism and the Theosophical Society. Elena Cappelli was succeeded by Elvira Giro (1910–1989) with Leone Graziani (1918–1993), then Fausta Cozzi (1925–2008) and finally Maurizio Maggioni, who currently leads the so-called Universal Juris-Davidic Church, quite distinct from the original Arcidosso movement.

== Organisation ==
In the original vision of the hierarchy of the Jurisdavidic Church, at the top was the 'hermit priest' (sacerdote eremita), the supreme leader of the religious community. At the second and lowest level were the 'twelve matrons' (dodici matrone) and the 'seven spiritual princes' (sette principi spirituali); at the third level, the 'twelve sisters of charity' (dodici suore di carità) and the 'twelve apostles' (dodici apostoli); at the fourth level, there were the 'twelve pious maidens' (dodici fanciulle pie) and the 'twelve disciples' (dodici discepoli); finally, at the fifth and lowest level, there were the 'twelve daughters of song' (dodici figlie dei cantici) and the 'twelve musicians' (dodici musicanti). (Note: The above roughly replicates the roles represented in the processions of August 1878 and nothing more.)

After Lazzaretti's death, on 18 August 1878 an assembly of followers established the new organisational chart of the Jurisdavidic Church: a first priest, twelve apostles, twelve disciples and twelve co-disciples. The first formation of the community established on that date is reported here.

- First priest: Filippo Imperiuzzi
- Twelve apostles: Filippo Corsini, Federico Bocchi, Achille Rossi, Giuseppe Vichi, Paolo Conti, Ottavio Federico Bramerini, Marco Pastorelli, Angelo Pii.
- Twelve disciples: Giuseppe Corsini, Luigi Vichi, Giuseppe Rossi, Achille Vichi, Martino Feri, Angelo Cheli, Francesco Tommencioni I, Francesco Tommencioni II, Antonio Domenichini, Domenico Contri, Gabriello Magnani, Cherubino Cheli.
- Twelve co-disciples: Domenico Pastorelli, Giuseppe Pastorelli, Angelo Bianchini, Leopoldo Monaci, Marsilio Lorenzoni, Bruno Massimi, Adriano Corsini, Vincenzo Polverini, Francesco Cheli, Luciano Contri, Paolo Dondolini, Pietro Bianchini.

=== High priests ===
Period	High priest
1878-1921	Filippo Imperiuzzi (1843-1921)
1921-1923	Cherubino Cheli (1843-1923)
1923-1934	Francesco Tommencioni (1853-1934)
1934-1936	Giovanni Conti (1880-1936)
1936-1944	Giuseppe Conti (1876-1944)
1944-1953	Arcangelo Cheli (1875-1953)
1953-1975	Nazzareno Bargagli (1888-1975)
1978-2002	Turpino Chiappini (1925-2002)

== Liturgy ==
The Jurisdavidic Mass consists of the rite of consecration of the bread and wine and the recitation of the act of contrition and prayers and litanies. The Jurisdavidic baptism is administered with the branding on the skin of a mark representing the symbol of Jurisdavidism, the double C with a cross in the middle symbolising the first and second coming of Christ; the funeral rite is officiated with praises and prayers.

== Sacred places ==
The sacred places of Jurisdavidism are located on Mount Labbro, renamed Labaro by Lazzaretti: the tower, the construction of which was started in July 1869 and finished in August 1870; the small church, consecrated in 1872 and the hermitage, completed in 1875. After Lazzaretti's death, the tower fell into disrepair and some initial attempts to restore it were undertaken in 1958 by some followers. Severely damaged by lightning, it was consolidated in 1995 and restored in the years between 2003 and 2004. Of the other buildings, it is possible to admire the ruins. Another sacred place is the so-called Grotta della Sabina, the medieval hermitage of Sant'Angelo, near Montorio Romano, where Davide Lazzaretti retired in penance for forty-seven days in 1868.
