= Vicarello =

Vicarello may refer to:

== Places ==
- Vicarello, Bracciano, a village in the metropolitan city of Rome, Italy
- Vicarello, Collesalvetti, a village in the province of Livorno, Italy

== Other uses ==
- Castle of Vicarello, a castle in Cinigiano, province of Grosseto, Tuscany
- Vicarello Cups, archaeological finds from Vicarello, Bracciano
