= Domenico Tonarelli =

Member of the Chamber of Deputies
- In office 23 November 1874 – 30 June 1876
- Constituency: Scansano

Prefect of Messina
- In office 30 June 1876 – 29 July 1878
- Preceded by: Giovanni De Lorenzo
- Succeeded by: Nicola Petra

Prefect of Cagliari
- In office 29 July 1878 – 22 May 1879
- Preceded by: Giovanni Minghelli Vaini
- Succeeded by: Francesco Brescia Morra

Prefect of Arezzo
- In office 16 September 1882 – 25 February 1886
- Preceded by: Giorgio Tamajo
- Succeeded by: Cesare Paroletti

Personal details
- Born: 2 August 1820 Scansano, Grand Duchy of Tuscany
- Died: 25 February 1886 (aged 65) Florence, Kingdom of Italy
- Occupation: Public officer, prefect

Domenico Tonarelli (2 August 1820 – 25 February 1886) was an Italian politician and prefect. He served as a member of the Chamber of Deputies during the 12th legislature and later held several prefectures, including Messina, Cagliari, and Arezzo.

== Life and career ==
Tonarelli was born in 1820 in Scansano, in the Grand Duchy of Tuscany. He was elected to the Chamber of Deputies in the November 1874 election for the constituency of Scansano. In the runoff on 15 November, he obtained 560 votes, defeating Bernardo Martinucci.

On 30 June 1876 Tonarelli was appointed prefect, vacating his seat in the Chamber of Deputies and being replaced by Isidoro Maggi. He served as prefect in Messina (1876–1878), Cagliari (1878–1879), and Arezzo (1882–1886).

He died in office on 25 February 1886 in Florence.

== Sources ==
- Storia dei collegi elettorali 1848–1897. Parte II. Rome: Ministero dell'agricoltura, industria e commercio. 1898. p. 610.
