= Castiglioncello Bandini =

- Frazione
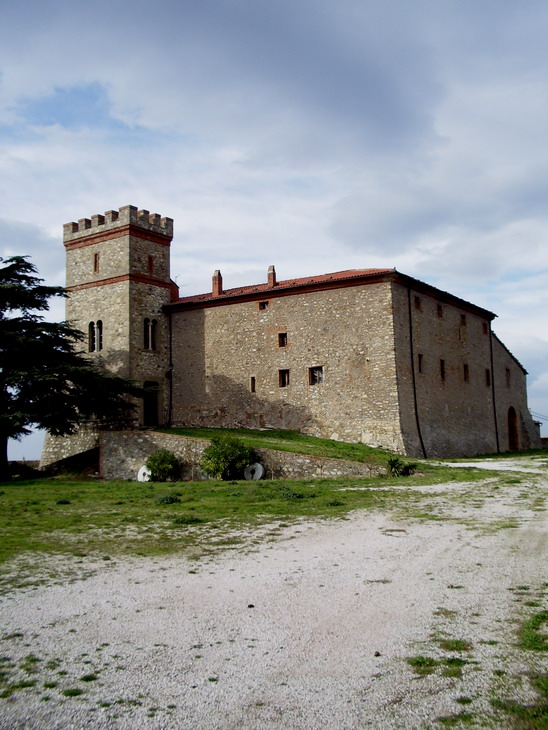
- Castiglion del Torto

- Location of Castiglioncello Bandini in Italy
- Coordinates: 42°52′29″N 11°26′32″E
- Country: Italy
- Region: Tuscany
- Province: Grosseto (GR)
- Comune: Cinigiano
- Elevation: 606 m (1,988 ft)

Population (2011)
  - Total: 90
- Demonym: Castiglioncellesi
- Time zone: UTC+1 (CET)
  - Summer (DST): UTC+2 (CEST)
- Postal code: 58040
- Dialing code: (+39) 0564

Castiglioncello Bandini is a village in Tuscany, central Italy, administratively a frazione of the comune of Cinigiano, province of Grosseto. At the time of the 2001 census its population amounted to 93.

Castiglioncello Bandini is about 50 km from Grosseto and 8 km from Cinigiano, and it is situated along the Provincial Road which links Monticello Amiata to Vallerona.

== History ==
Ruled by the Aldobrandeschi family in the Early Middle Ages, the castle of Castiglioncello was then held by the Piccolomini-Bandini.

== Main sights ==
- San Nicola (16th century), main parish church of the village, it was entirely re-built in the 16th century in place of an early church dating back to the Middle Ages.
- Chiesa del Madonnino (17th century), little church located near the castle, it was built in a Baroque style.
- Castiglion del Torto, old castle built by Aldobrandeschis in the 13th century, it was known also as Castiglioncello di Stribugliano for its proximity to the village of Stribugliano.

== Bibliography ==
- Aldo Mazzolai, Guida della Maremma. Percorsi tra arte e natura, Florence, Le Lettere, 1997.
- Giuseppe Guerrini, Torri e castelli della provincia di Grosseto, Siena, Nuova Immagine Editrice, 1999.

== See also ==
- Borgo Santa Rita
- Monticello Amiata
- Poggi del Sasso
- Porrona
- Sasso d'Ombrone
