= Monte Labbro =

Mountain in Tuscany, Italy

- Monte Labro
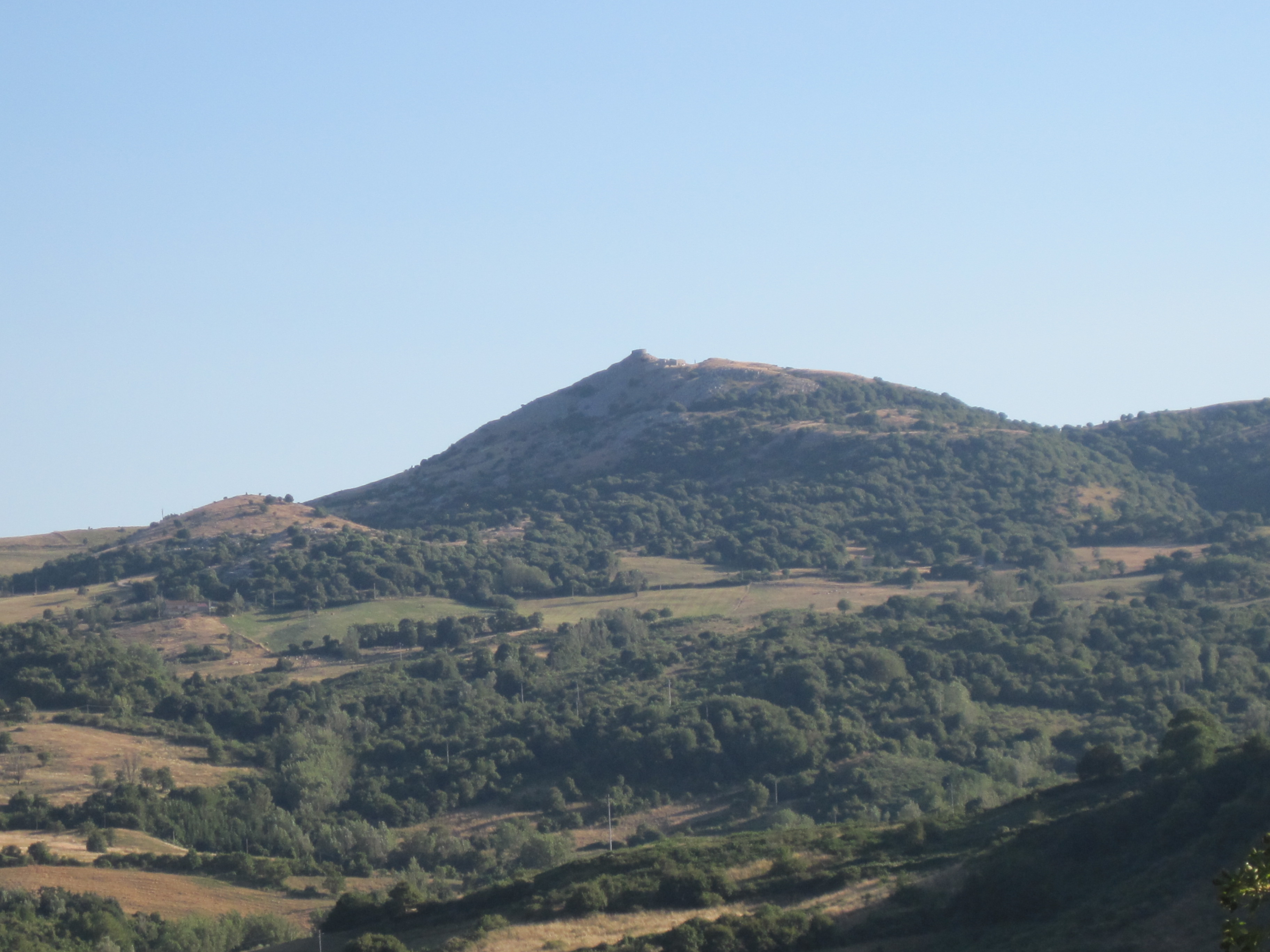
- View of Monte Labbro

Highest point
- Elevation: 1,193 m (3,914 ft)
- Coordinates: 42°49′13.24″N 11°31′33.8″E

Geography
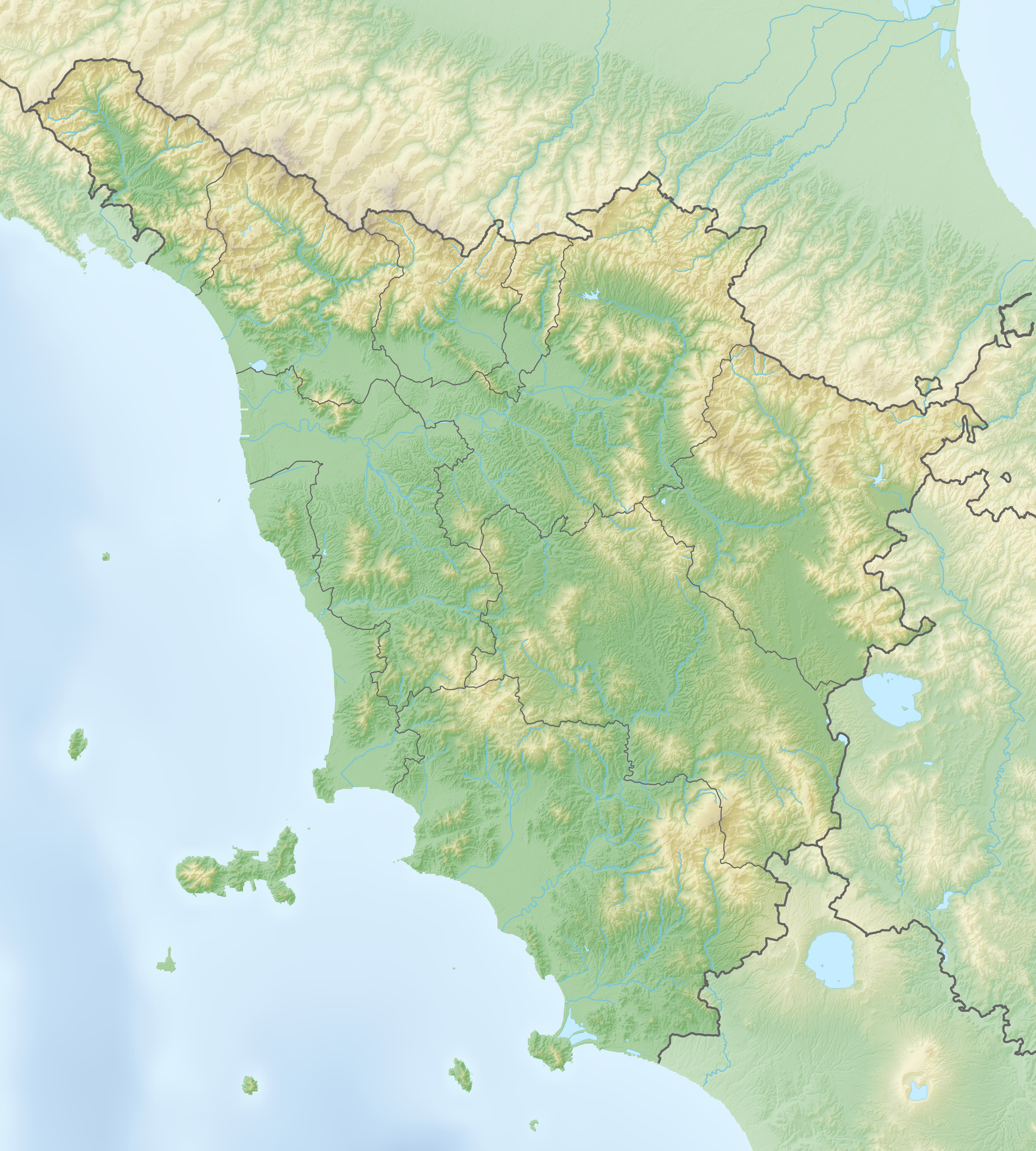
- Location within Tuscany Location within Italy
- Location: Arcidosso, Tuscany, Italy
- Parent range: Monte Amiata

Monte Labbro (also known as Labro) is a mountain rising to 1,193 metres above sea level in the province of Grosseto, Tuscany, Italy. It is located at the south-western edge of the volcanic cone of Mount Amiata and lies at the centre of the Monte Labbro Nature Reserve, within whose boundaries the Monte Amiata Faunal Park is also located.

Geologically, Monte Labbro is composed mainly of Eocene limestone, forming a distinct calcareous relief compared with the volcanic formations of the Amiata massif. The mountain falls within the south-western part of the municipality of Arcidosso. The mountain is part of a north-west to south-east–oriented ridge system, with elevations around 1,000 metres, which separates it from the Amiata chain. This ridge is divided from the Amiata massif by the Zancona River, along whose banks lie the villages of Zancona and Le Macchie, both hamlets of Arcidosso.

The summit area is notable for the Torre Giurisdavidica, which served as the religious centre of the messianic movement founded by the preacher David Lazzaretti in the 19th century.
