= Porrona =

- Frazione
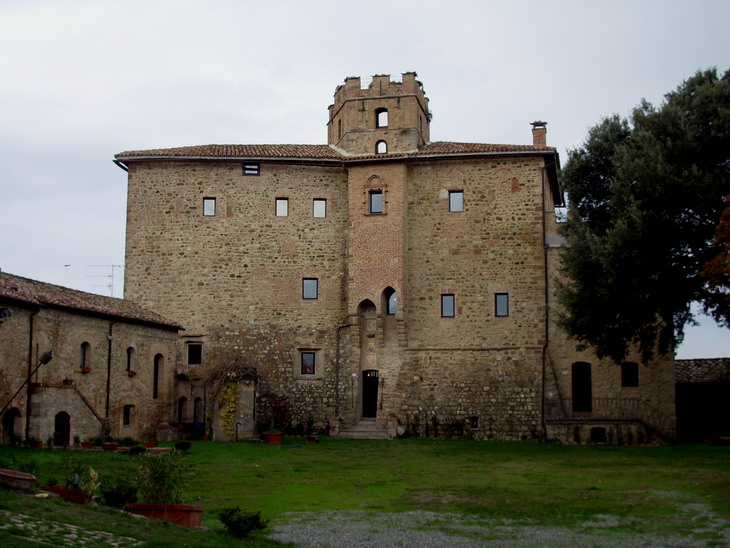
- The castle of Porrona

- Location of Porrona in Italy
- Coordinates: 42°54′39″N 11°24′31″E
- Country: Italy
- Region: Tuscany
- Province: Grosseto (GR)
- Comune: Cinigiano
- Elevation: 254 m (833 ft)

Population (2011)
  - Total: 25
- Demonym: Porronesi
- Time zone: UTC+1 (CET)
  - Summer (DST): UTC+2 (CEST)
- Postal code: 58040
- Dialing code: (+39) 0564

Porrona is a village in Tuscany, central Italy, administratively a frazione of the comune of Cinigiano, province of Grosseto. At the time of the 2001 census its population amounted to 24.

Porrona is about 40 km from Grosseto and 4 km from Cinigiano, and it is situated along the road which links the Cipressino Provincial Road at Sant'Angelo Scalo to Cinigiano.

== History ==
The village was born in the 13th century as a castle of the Republic of Siena. It has become the seat of notable Sienese families since the 14th century (Piccolomini, Tolomei).

== Main sights ==
- Pieve of San Donato (13th century), main parish church of the village, it is a notable Romanesque architecture.
- Madonna delle Grazie (17th century), it was built as a chapel outside the walls.
- Castle of Porrona (13th century), ancient Sienese building, it was re-built in the 16th century after the annexation to the Grand Duchy of Tuscany. It was then restructured with Gothic Revival elements in the early 20th century.
- Walls of Porrona, old fortifications which surround the village since 13th century.

== Bibliography ==
- (in Italian) Emanuele Repetti, «Porrona», Dizionario Geografico Fisico Storico della Toscana, 1833–1846.
- Bruno Santi, Guida storico-artistica alla Maremma. Itinerari culturali nella provincia di Grosseto, Siena, Nuova Immagine, 1995, p. 175-178.
- Aldo Mazzolai, Guida della Maremma. Percorsi tra arte e natura, Florence, Le Lettere, 1997.
- Giuseppe Guerrini, Torri e castelli della provincia di Grosseto, Siena, Nuova Immagine, 1999.

== See also ==
- Borgo Santa Rita
- Castiglioncello Bandini
- Monticello Amiata
- Poggi del Sasso
- Sasso d'Ombrone
