= Lazzaretti =

Lazzaretti is an Italian surname. Notable people with this surname include:

- David Lazzaretti (1834–1878), Italian preacher and cult leader
- Gustavo Lazzaretti (born 1984), Brazilian footballer
- Rob Lazzaretti, American artist
- Romolo Lazzaretti (1895–1976), Italian cyclist
