= Monticello Amiata =

- Frazione
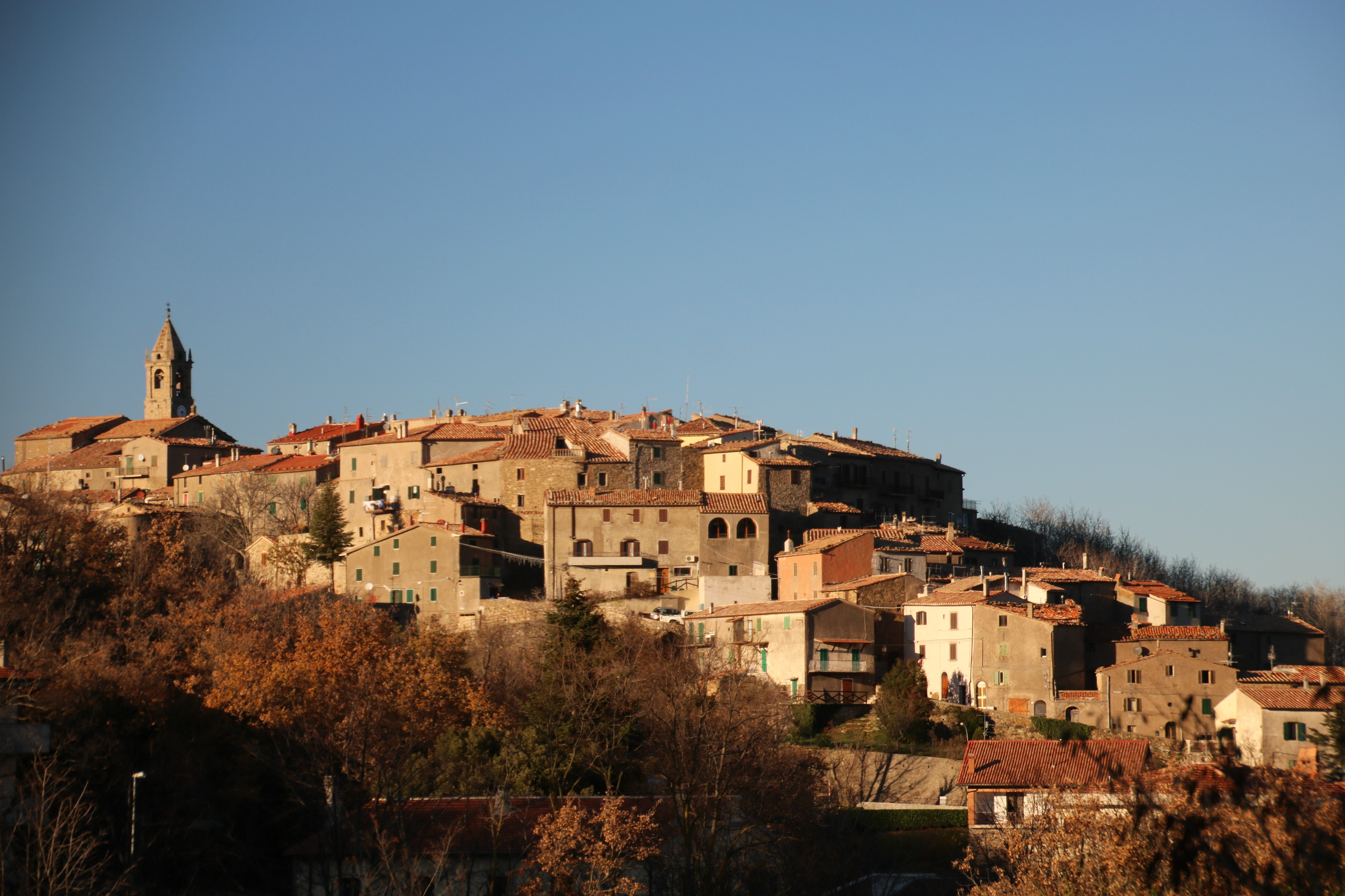
- View of Monticello Amiata

- Location of Monticello Amiata in Italy
- Coordinates: 42°53′14″N 11°28′52″E
- Country: Italy
- Region: Tuscany
- Province: Grosseto (GR)
- Comune: Cinigiano
- Elevation: 734 m (2,408 ft)

Population (2011)
  - Total: 442
- Demonym: Monticellesi
- Time zone: UTC+1 (CET)
  - Summer (DST): UTC+2 (CEST)
- Postal code: 58044
- Dialing code: (+39) 0564

Monticello Amiata is a village in Tuscany, central Italy, administratively a frazione of the comune of Cinigiano, province of Grosseto. At the time of the 2001 census its population amounted to 425.

== Geography ==
Monticello Amiata is about 50 km from Grosseto and 9 km from Cinigiano, and it is situated along the Provincial Road which links Cinigiano to Arcidosso.

== History ==
Originally known as Montepinzutolo, it was mentioned for the first time in an act by Conrad II in 1027. The village became a comune in 1261, but it lost its autonomy in 1783, when it became a frazione of Cinigiano.

== Main sights ==
- San Michele Arcangelo (13th century), main parish church of the village, it was entirely re-built in the 13th century after the fire which destroyed Montepinzutolo in 1240. It contains some paintings of Bartolomeo Neroni and Rutilio Manetti.
- Oratory of San Sebastiano (15th century), it contains a painting of Domenico Manetti.
- Sanctuary of Madonna di Val di Prata (13th century), situated in the Parco della Rimembranza outside the city walls, it was restructured in the 19th century. It contains several paintings and an altarpiece by Giuseppe Nicola Nasini.
- Chapel of Madonna del Lampino (16th century), little church in the hamlet of Ripe.
- Palazzo Comunale (Town Hall), former seat of the municipality of Monticello Amiata, it was built in the 17th century. It was then used as a courthouse after 1783. It hosts now the ethnographic museum.
- Walls of Monticello Amiata, old fortifications which surround the village since 13th century, after the fire that destroyed the first walls. The walls have two main gates: Porta Grossetana (west) and Porta Senese (east).
- Casa-Museo (House-Museum), ethnographic museum of Monticello Amiata, it describes the rural context in an everyday life-typical house of the 19th century.

== See also ==
- Borgo Santa Rita
- Castiglioncello Bandini
- Poggi del Sasso
- Porrona
- Sasso d'Ombrone

== Bibliography ==
- Bruno Santi, Guida storico-artistica alla Maremma. Itinerari culturali nella provincia di Grosseto, Siena, Nuova Immagine, 1995, p. 172-175.
- Aldo Mazzolai, Guida della Maremma. Percorsi tra arte e natura, Florence, Le Lettere, 1997.
- Giuseppe Guerrini, Torri e castelli della provincia di Grosseto, Siena, Nuova Immagine, 1999.
