= Montelaterone =

- Frazione
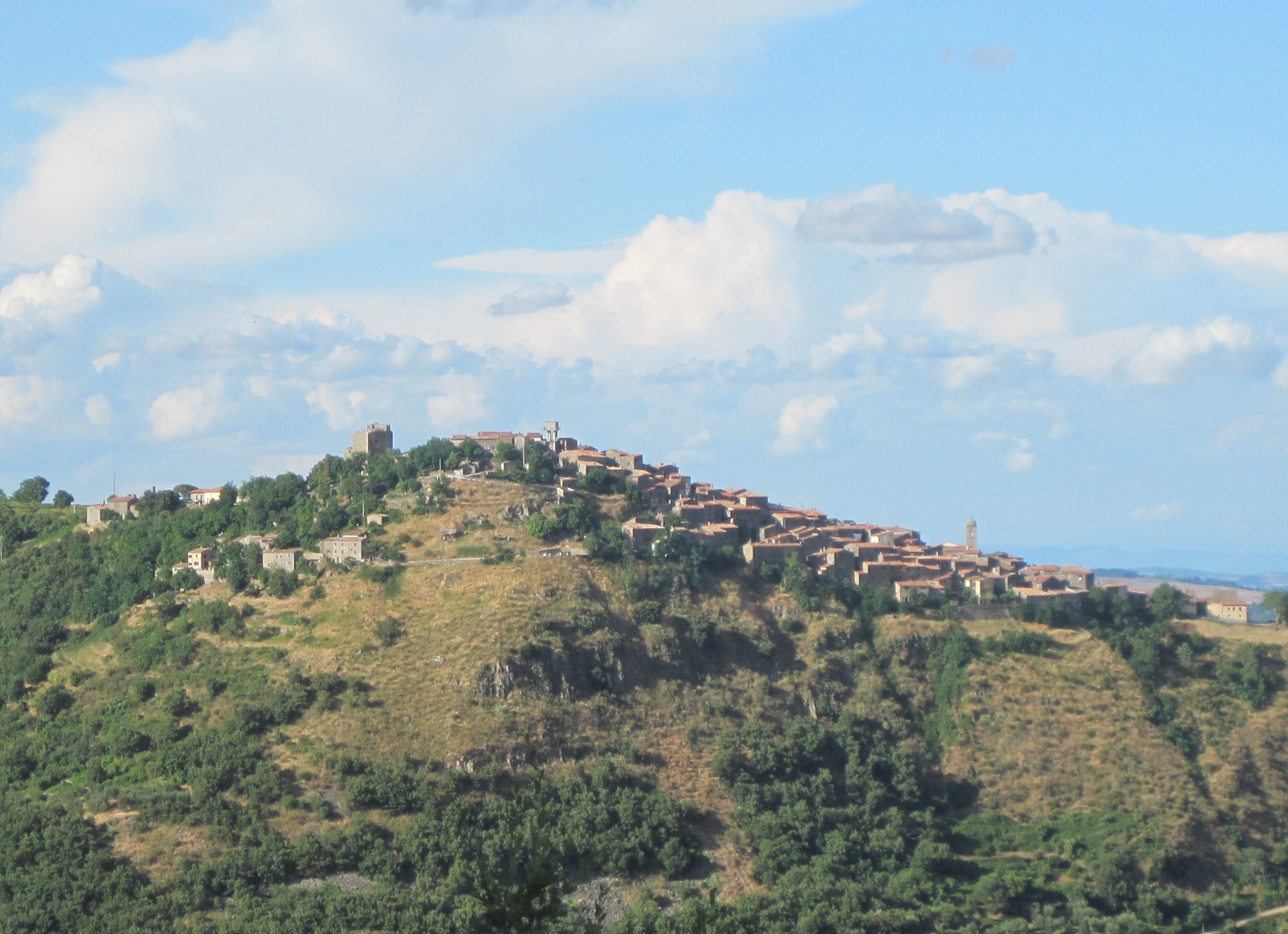
- View of Montelaterone from Zancona

- Location of Montelaterone in Italy
- Coordinates: 42°53′15″N 11°30′45″E
- Country: Italy
- Region: Tuscany
- Province: Grosseto (GR)
- Comune: Arcidosso
- Elevation: 670 m (2,200 ft)

Population (2001)
  - Total: 283
- Demonym: Montelateronesi
- Time zone: UTC+1 (CET)
  - Summer (DST): UTC+2 (CEST)
- Postal code: 58030
- Dialing code: 0564

Montelaterone (Italian: [ˌmontelateˈroːne]) is a village in Tuscany, central Italy, administratively a frazione of the comune of Arcidosso, province of Grosseto, in the area of Mount Amiata. At the time of the 2001 census its population amounted to 283.

Montelaterone is about 52 km from Grosseto and 4 km from Arcidosso, and it is situated on a sandstone peak between the valleys of Ente and Zancona rivers.

== Main sights ==
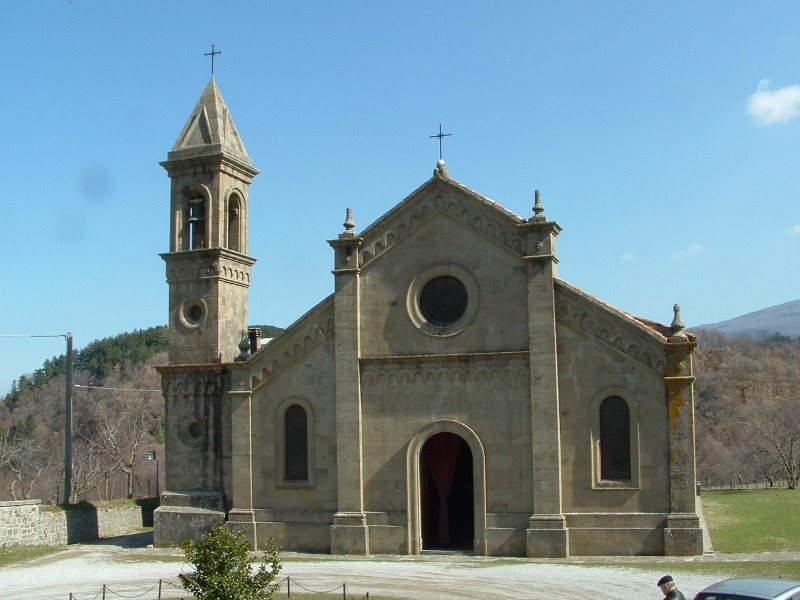
The old pieve of Santa Maria a Lamula

- Church of San Clemente (14th century), main parish church of the village
- Church of Madonna della Misericordia (17th century), with frescoes by Francesco and Giuseppe Nicola Nasini
- Chapel of Santa Lucia in Stiacciaie (14th century)
- Pieve of Santa Maria a Lamula (12th century), between Montelaterone and Arcidosso, it is an important and ancient Romanesque church.
- Palazzo Pretorio (13th century), ancient city hall
- Walls of Montelaterone, old fortifications which surround the village since 11th century
- Cassero Senese, a 13th-century fortress

== People ==
- Apollonio Apolloni, physician and patriot

== Bibliography ==
- Aldo Mazzolai, Guida della Maremma. Percorsi tra arte e natura, Le Lettere, Florence, 1997
- Giuseppe Guerrini, Torri e castelli della Provincia di Grosseto, Nuova Immagine Editrice, Siena, 1999

== See also ==
- Bagnoli, Arcidosso
- Le Macchie
- Salaiola
- San Lorenzo, Arcidosso
- Stribugliano
- Zancona
