= San Lorenzo, Arcidosso =

San Lorenzo
- Frazione
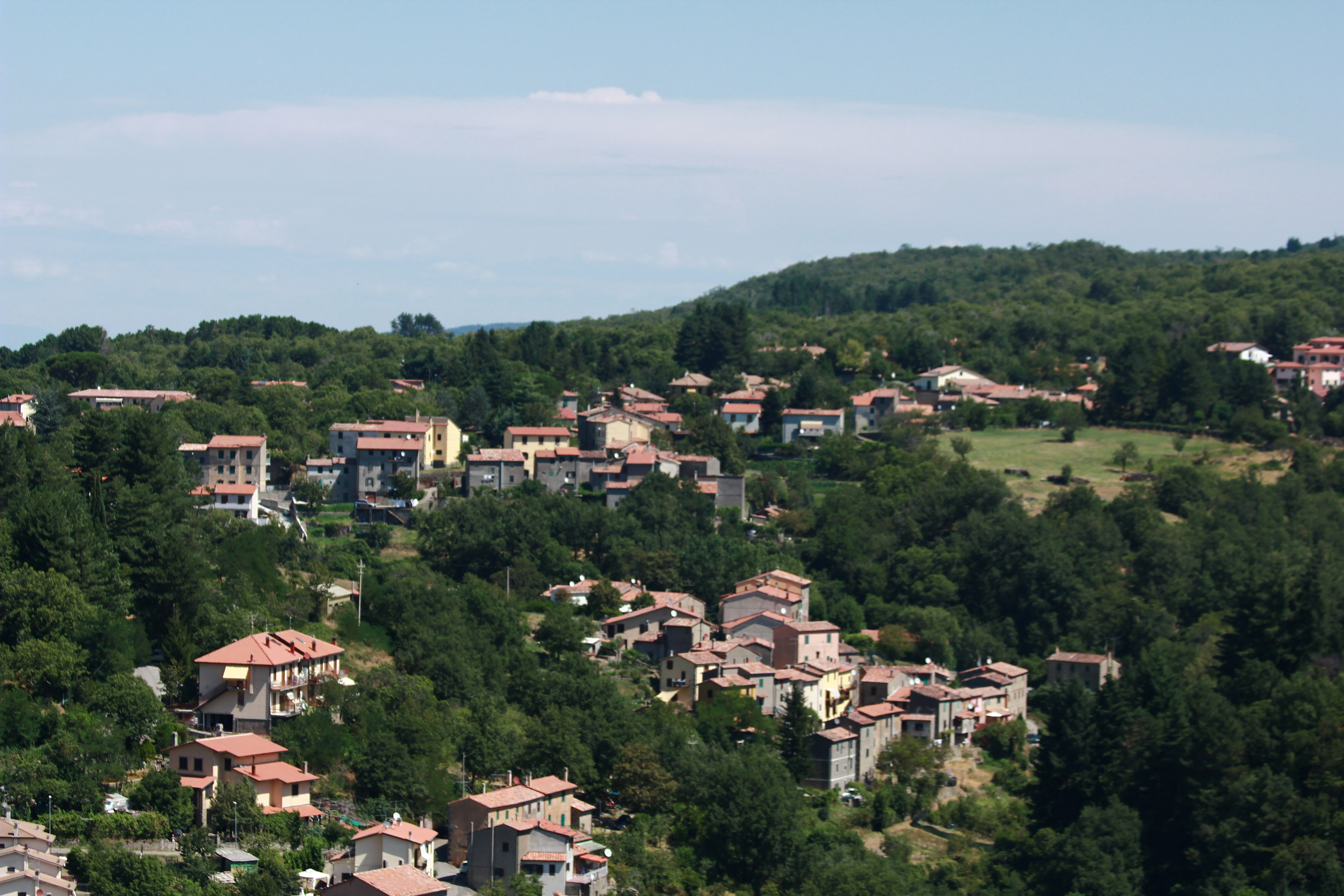
- View of San Lorenzo

- Location of San Lorenzo in Italy
- Coordinates: 42°52′49″N 11°32′35″E
- Country: Italy
- Region: Tuscany
- Province: Grosseto (GR)
- Comune: Arcidosso
- Elevation: 680 m (2,230 ft)

Population (2011)
  - Total: 274
- Demonym: Sanlorenzini
- Time zone: UTC+1 (CET)
  - Summer (DST): UTC+2 (CEST)
- Postal code: 58031
- Dialing code: (+39) 0564

San Lorenzo is a village in Tuscany, central Italy, administratively a frazione of the comune of Arcidosso, province of Grosseto, in the area of Mount Amiata. At the time of the 2001 census its population amounted to 211.

San Lorenzo is about 56 km from Grosseto and 2 km from Arcidosso, and it is situated between the towns of Arcidosso and Castel del Piano.

== Main sights ==
- Church of San Lorenzo, a little church attested for the first time in a document of 1067.
- Convent of Capuchins, built in 1593, it contains paintings by Francesco Vanni and Giuseppe Nicola Nasini.
- Chapel of Merope Becchini, a neo-gothic chapel, it was built by architect Lorenzo Porciatti in 1902. It is situated in the square of the convent and it is dedicated to the prematurely dead daughter of the former mayor of Arcidosso.
- Villa of Palazzina, a villa of Giovannini family, it was built in a baroque style in 1620.
- Cave of Merlin, a cave where, according to legend, Merlin lived many centuries ago.

== Bibliography ==
- Aldo Mazzolai, Guida della Maremma. Percorsi tra arte e natura, Le Lettere, Florence, 1997.
- Carlo Morganti, Susanna Nanni, Itinerari a piedi nel comune di Arcidosso. Zaino in spalla alla scoperta del territorio, Arcidosso, C&P Adver Effigi, 2008.

== See also ==
- Bagnoli, Arcidosso
- Le Macchie
- Montelaterone
- Salaiola
- Stribugliano
- Zancona
