= Sasso d'Ombrone =

- Frazione
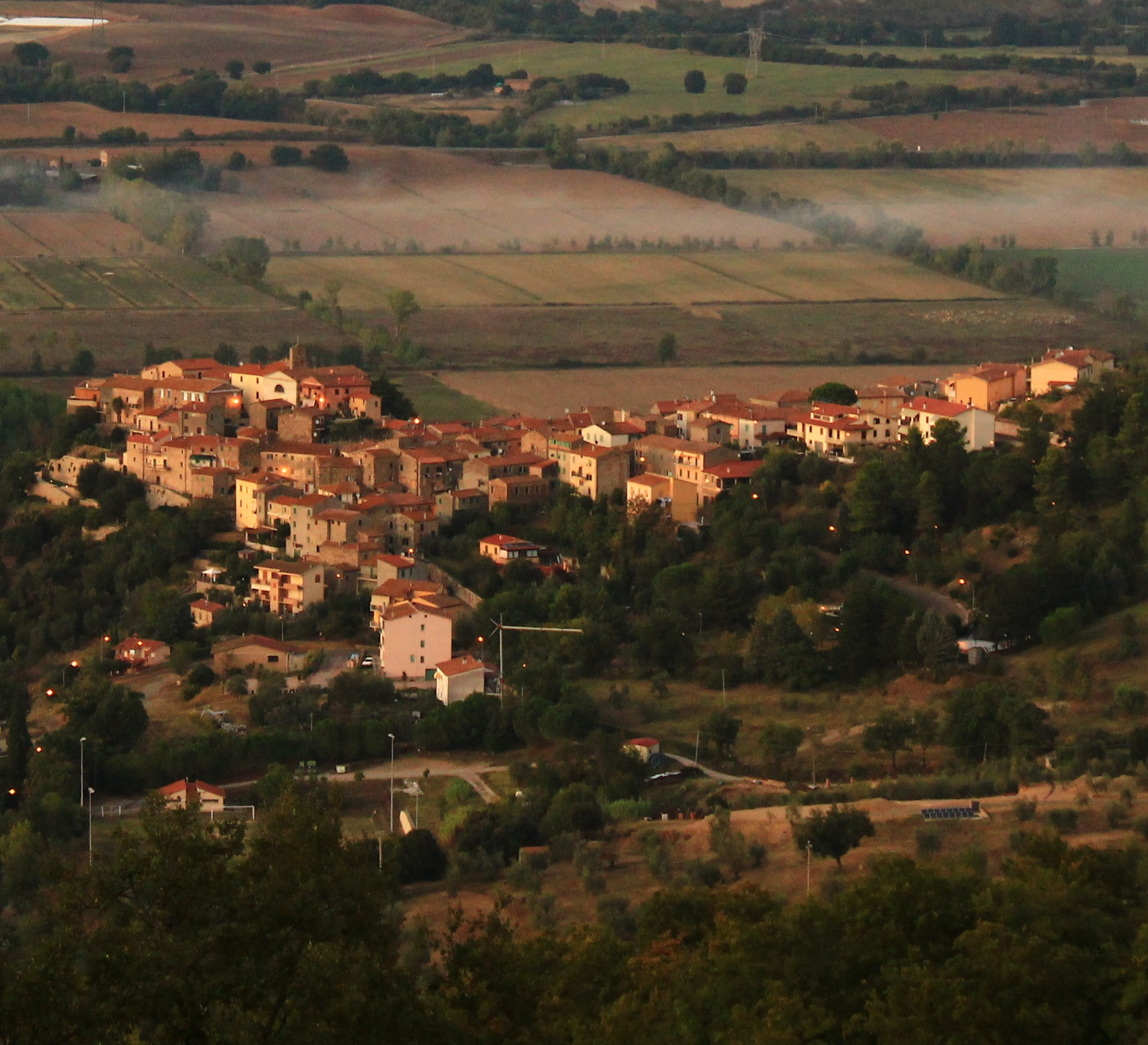
- View of Sasso d'Ombrone

- Location of Sasso d'Ombrone in Italy
- Coordinates: 42°55′56″N 11°19′29″E
- Country: Italy
- Region: Tuscany
- Province: Grosseto (GR)
- Comune: Cinigiano
- Elevation: 160 m (520 ft)

Population (2011)
  - Total: 314
- Demonym: Sassaioli
- Time zone: UTC+1 (CET)
  - Summer (DST): UTC+2 (CEST)
- Postal code: 58044
- Dialing code: (+39) 0564

Sasso d'Ombrone is a village in Tuscany, central Italy, administratively a frazione of the comune of Cinigiano, province of Grosseto. At the time of the 2001 census its population amounted to 300.

Sasso d'Ombrone is about 33 km from Grosseto and 8 km from Cinigiano, and it is situated along the road which links Cinigiano to the Cipressino Provincial Road at Paganico, on a hill in the valley of Ombrone.

== History ==
Formerly known as Sasso di Maremma, the village was born in the 13th century as a castle of the Aldobrandeschi. It was then held by the Ardengheschi and conquered by the Republic of Siena in the 15th century.

== Main sights ==
- Church of San Michele Arcangelo (13th century), main parish church of the village, it was re-built in the 16th century and then in the early 19th century.
- Sanctuary of Madonna del Soccorso (16th century), it was entirely re-built in 1872.
- Castle of Sasso (13th century), it's now in ruins.

== Bibliography ==
- (in Italian) Emanuele Repetti, «Sasso d'Ombrone », Dizionario Geografico Fisico Storico della Toscana, 1833–1846.
- Bruno Santi, Guida storico-artistica alla Maremma. Itinerari culturali nella provincia di Grosseto, Siena, Nuova Immagine, 1995, p. 178-179.
- Aldo Mazzolai, Guida della Maremma. Percorsi tra arte e natura, Florence, Le Lettere, 1997.
- Giuseppe Guerrini, Torri e castelli della provincia di Grosseto, Siena, Nuova Immagine, 1999.

== See also ==
- Borgo Santa Rita
- Castiglioncello Bandini
- Monticello Amiata
- Poggi del Sasso
- Porrona
