= Poggi del Sasso =

- Frazione
- Location of Poggi del Sasso in Italy
- Coordinates: 42°54′25″N 11°19′23″E
- Country: Italy
- Region: Tuscany
- Province: Grosseto (GR)
- Comune: Cinigiano
- Elevation: 349 m (1,145 ft)

Population (2011)
  - Total: 98
- Time zone: UTC+1 (CET)
  - Summer (DST): UTC+2 (CEST)
- Postal code: 58044
- Dialing code: (+39) 0564

Poggi del Sasso is a village in Tuscany, central Italy, administratively a frazione of the comune of Cinigiano, province of Grosseto. At the time of the 2001 census its population amounted to 88.

== Geography ==
Poggi del Sasso is about 37 km from Grosseto and 10 km from Cinigiano, and it is situated along the provincial road which links Sasso d'Ombrone to the castle of Montecucco and the hamlet of Piantaverna. The village lies in the valley of Ombrone. The territory of Poggi del Sasso is known for the production of the wine Montecucco.

== Main sights ==
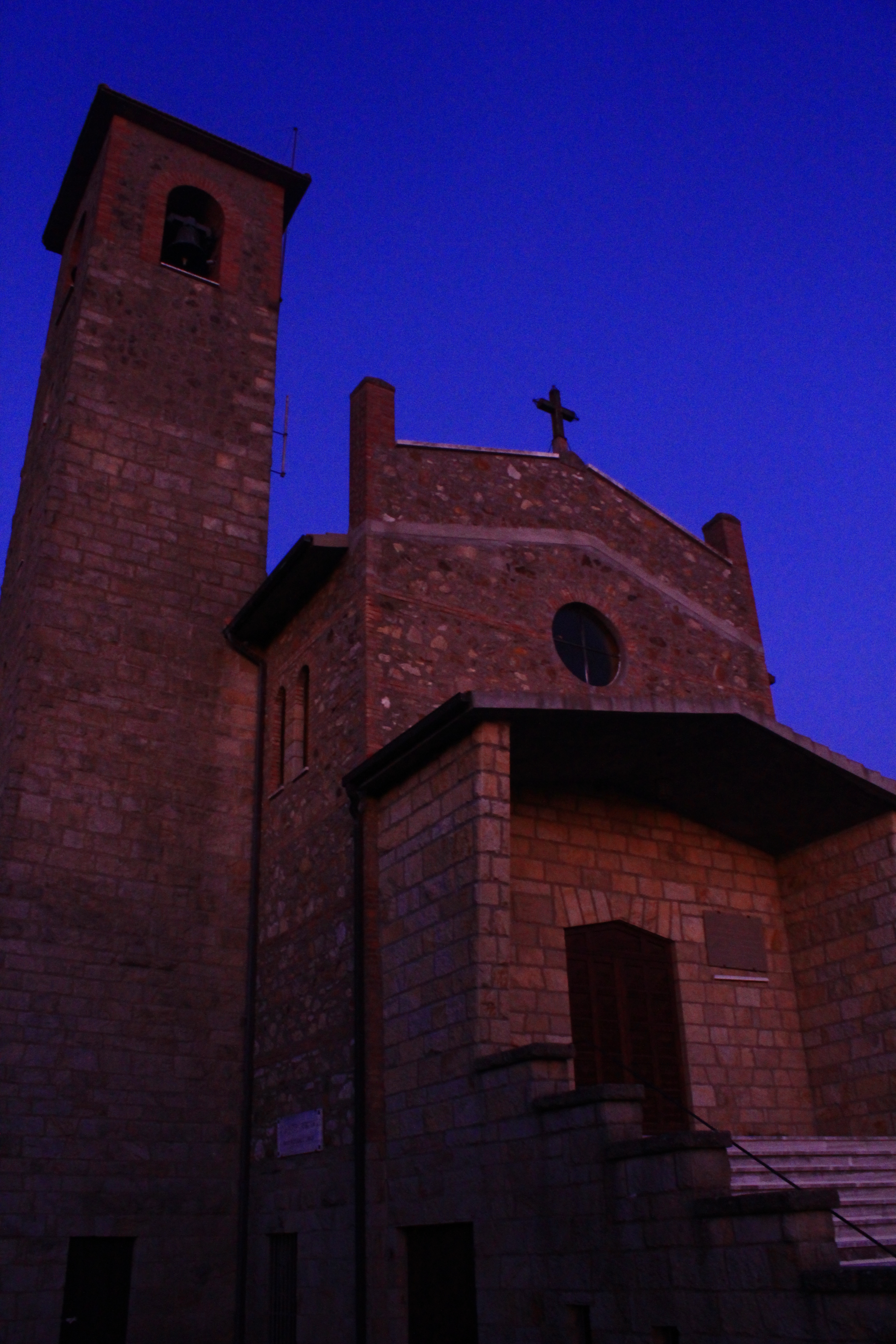
The church of Santa Margherita

=== Churches ===
- Santa Margherita (20th century), main parish church of the village, it was designed by engineer Ernesto Ganelli in 1958 and consecrated in 1970. It contains several Renaissance paintings formerly preserved in the church of Vicarello.
- Monastery of Siloe (2001–2025), a contemporary architecture designed by Edoardo Milesi, it includes a convent, a church and a chapel.

=== Castles ===
- Castle of Colle Massari (11th century), with the chapel of Santa Marta (17th century).
- Castle of Monte Cucco (11th century), with the chapel of Sant'Antonio Abate (1930s).
- Castle of Vicarello (13th century), with the old pieve of San Martino (now converted into a house).

=== Buildings ===
- Collemassari Winery
- Fondazione Bertarelli Concert Hall

== See also ==
- Borgo Santa Rita
- Castiglioncello Bandini
- Monticello Amiata
- Porrona
- Sasso d'Ombrone
