= Salaiola =

- Frazione
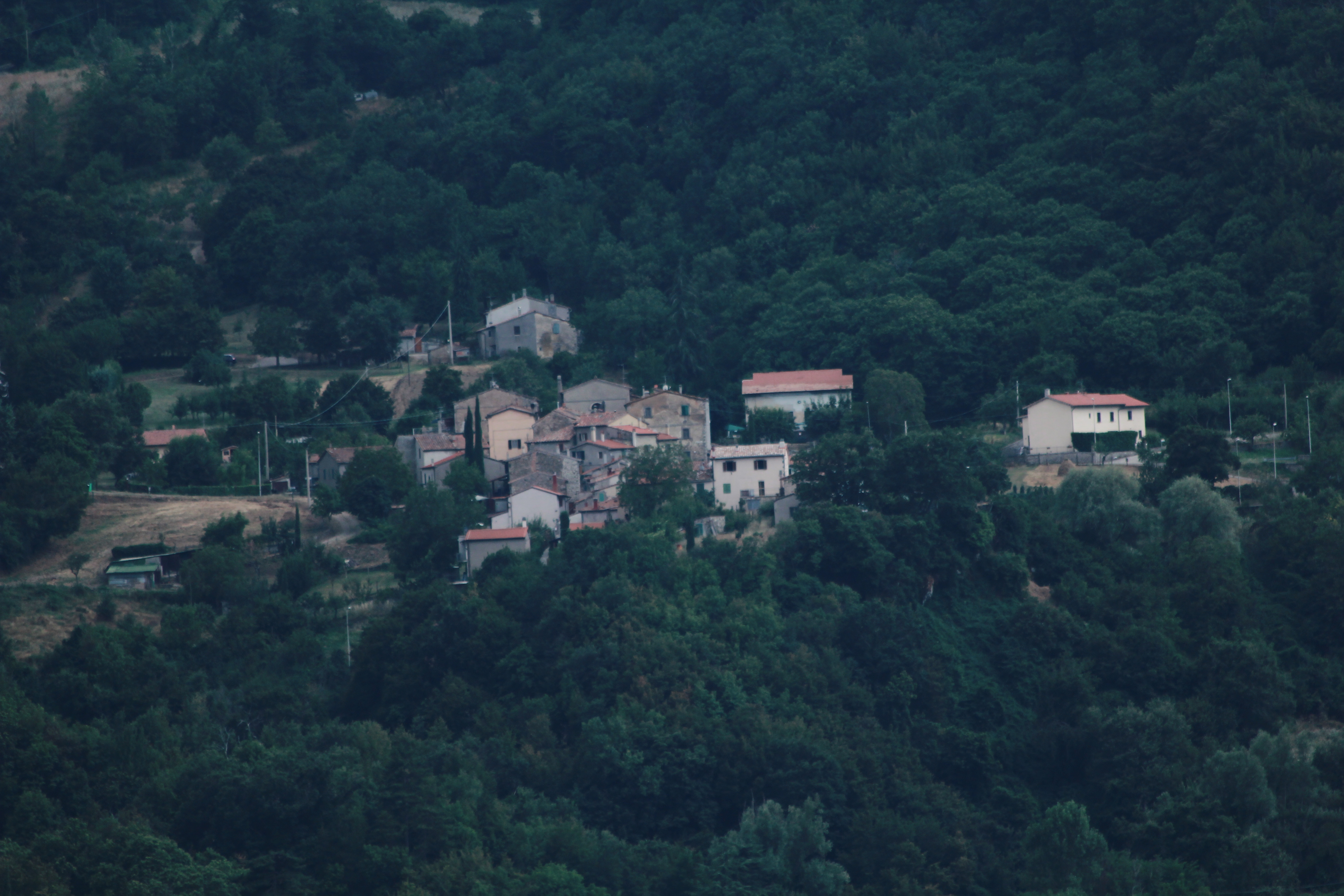
- View of Salaiola

- Location of Salaiola in Italy
- Coordinates: 42°52′11″N 11°30′04″E
- Country: Italy
- Region: Tuscany
- Province: Grosseto (GR)
- Comune: Arcidosso
- Elevation: 740 m (2,430 ft)

Population (2011)
  - Total: 34
- Demonym: Salaiolesi
- Time zone: UTC+1 (CET)
  - Summer (DST): UTC+2 (CEST)
- Postal code: 58031
- Dialing code: (+39) 0564

Salaiola is a village in Tuscany, central Italy, administratively a frazione of the comune of Arcidosso, province of Grosseto, in the area of Mount Amiata. At the time of the 2001 census its population amounted to 39.

Salaiola is about 55 km from Grosseto and 8 km from Arcidosso, and it is situated on the slopes of Mount Aquileia, one of the peaks of Mount Amiata. Here once stood the early medieval village of Roveta.

== Main sights ==
- Church of the Madonna, main parish church of the village, built in 1863.
- Chapel of San Girolamo, old chapel of Casal Roveta.
- Casal Roveta, old farmhouse situated near the village, it is the last evidence of the ancient settlement of Roveta.

== Bibliography ==
- Aldo Mazzolai, Guida della Maremma. Percorsi tra arte e natura, Le Lettere, Florence, 1997

== See also ==
- Bagnoli, Arcidosso
- Le Macchie
- Montelaterone
- San Lorenzo, Arcidosso
- Stribugliano
- Zancona
