= Antonio De Witt =

Member of the Chamber of Deputies
- In office 1865–1867
- In office 1870–1874
- In office 1876–1882
- Parliamentary group: Historical Left
- Constituency: Scansano

Personal details
- Born: 20 June 1828 Orbetello, Grand Duchy of Tuscany
- Died: 12 December 1889 (aged 61)
- Occupation: Lawyer

Antonio De Witt (20 June 1828 – 12 December 1889) was an Italian lawyer and politician who served as a member of the Chamber of Deputies of the Kingdom of Italy. He was associated with the Historical Left.

== Early life and education ==
De Witt was born in Orbetello, in the Maremma region of the Grand Duchy of Tuscany.

He studied at the seminary of Montefiascone and in 1847 enrolled at the University of Pisa. The following year he took part, together with other Pisan students, in the battle of Curtatone and Montanara during the first Italian War of Independence.

He graduated in law in 1850 and moved to Florence, where he practised as a lawyer. In 1854 he married Rosa Pazzella, daughter of the president of the Florentine Court of Cassation. In Florence he also served as lieutenant and member of the disciplinary council of officers and general staff of the National Guard.

== Political career ==
In 1865 De Witt was elected to the Chamber of Deputies for the constituency of Scansano. He defeated the outgoing deputy Vincenzo Ricasoli in the runoff held on 29 October 1865. However, he lost the seat in the subsequent 1867 election.

He was re-elected in November 1870 for the 11th Legislature and later returned to Parliament in 1876 following the annulment of the election of deputy Isidoro Maggi. He was again re-elected for the 14th Legislature in May 1880. His parliamentary career ended in 1882, when the constituency of Scansano was merged into that of Grosseto.

De Witt was a Freemason and a member of the Grand Orient of Italy. In 1874 he was a member of the Grand Council of the Order.

On 4 October 1889, he was appointed inspector of archaeological excavations in the Maremma. He died two months later, on 12 December 1889.
