= Telemaco Ferrini =

Member of the Chamber of Deputies
- In office May 1878 – 27 November 1884
- Constituency: Grosseto

Personal details
- Born: 18 October 1841 Arcidosso, Grand Duchy of Tuscany
- Died: 4 September 1885 (aged 43)
- Occupation: Lawyer, journalist

Telemaco Ferrini (18 October 1841 – 4 September 1885) was an Italian lawyer, journalist, and politician.

== Life and career ==
Ferrini was born in Arcidosso, in the Grand Duchy of Tuscany, in 1841. He was the son of Isidoro (1809–1873), a jurist who served as mayor of Arcidosso and as a deputy to the Tuscan Assembly of 1859.

He fought alongside Giuseppe Garibaldi in 1866. After completing his university studies in Siena and earning a law degree, he practised as a lawyer and was also active as a journalist.

On 28 April 1878 he ran in a by-election for the Chamber of Deputies in the Grosseto constituency, following the death of deputy Lorenzo Nelli. He was elected and subsequently re-elected for the next two legislatures. He also served as secretary of the Presidency of the Chamber. Ferrini resigned from Parliament on 27 November 1884 and was replaced by Rear Admiral Carlo Alberto Racchia.

He died on 4 September 1885 as a result of sudden cerebral paralysis.

== Sources ==
- Storia dei collegi elettorali 1848–1897. Rome: Ministero dell'agricoltura, industria e commercio. 1898. p. 308.
- Badii, Gaetano (1933). "Telemaco Ferrini". In Rosi, Michele (ed.). Dizionario del Risorgimento nazionale. Vol. 3. Milan: Vallardi.
- Di Salvo, Salvatore (July 2013). "Deputati dell'Ottocento grossetano. Isidoro Maggi e Telemaco Ferrini". Amiata. Storia e territorio. Vol. XXVI, no. 71. pp. 43–53.
