= Tolomei =

Tolomei may refer to:

== People ==
- Bernardo Tolomei (1272–1348), Roman Catholic cleric
- Stella de' Tolomei (died 1419), Italian courtier
- Antonio de' Tolomei (died 1498), Roman Catholic prelate
- Claudio Tolomei (1492–1556), Italian philologist
- Giovanni Battista Tolomei (1653–1726), Italian Jesuit cardinal
- Ettore Tolomei (1865–1952), Italian nationalist
- Rogério Tolomei Teixeira (a.k.a. Rogério Skylab; born 1956), Brazilian musician, poet, and essayist

== Other uses ==
- Palazzo Tolomei, an urban palace in Siena, Italy
- Collegio Tolomei, Siena, high school in Siena, Italy

== See also ==
- Pia de' Tolomei (disambiguation)
