= Apollonio Apolloni =

- Born: 27 November 1831; Montelaterone, Arcidosso, Grand Duchy of Tuscany
- Died: 4 July 1904 (aged 72); Pisa, Kingdom of Italy
- Occupation: Physician

Apollonio Apolloni (27 November 1831 – 4 July 1904) was an Italian physician and patriot active in the Risorgimento.

== Life and career ==
Born in Montelaterone, Arcidosso, in the Grand Duchy of Tuscany, Apolloni was orphaned early and raised by his maternal uncle, the physician Raffaello Lepri. He initially studied law in Florence but switched to medicine, graduating in 1854, and practiced in Scansano and Gavorrano.

A supporter of Young Italy, he fought as a volunteer in the battle of Curtatone (1848), later joining the Hunters of the Alps under Giuseppe Garibaldi in 1859 and leading a group of volunteers from Massa Marittima in the battle of the Volturno. He participated in Garibaldi's campaigns in 1866 and 1867, earning a medal for valor.

Apolloni was active in social and political initiatives, including local Committees of Provision and the mutualist Fratellanza artigiana. In 1882, he co-founded the Società pisana per la cremazione, promoting cremation and hygiene. Despite repeated arrests for his political activities, he continued working as a physician and railway health inspector until his death in Pisa in 1904.

== Sources ==
- Michel, Ersilio (1930). "Apollonio Apolloni". In Michele Rosi (ed.). Dizionario del Risorgimento nazionale. Vol. 2. Milan: Vallardi. pp. 93–94.
- Piane, Sergio; Spadafora, Ippolito (2006). La massoneria a Pisa. Dalle origini ai primi del Novecento. Foggia: Bastogi.
