= Borgo Santa Rita =

- Frazione
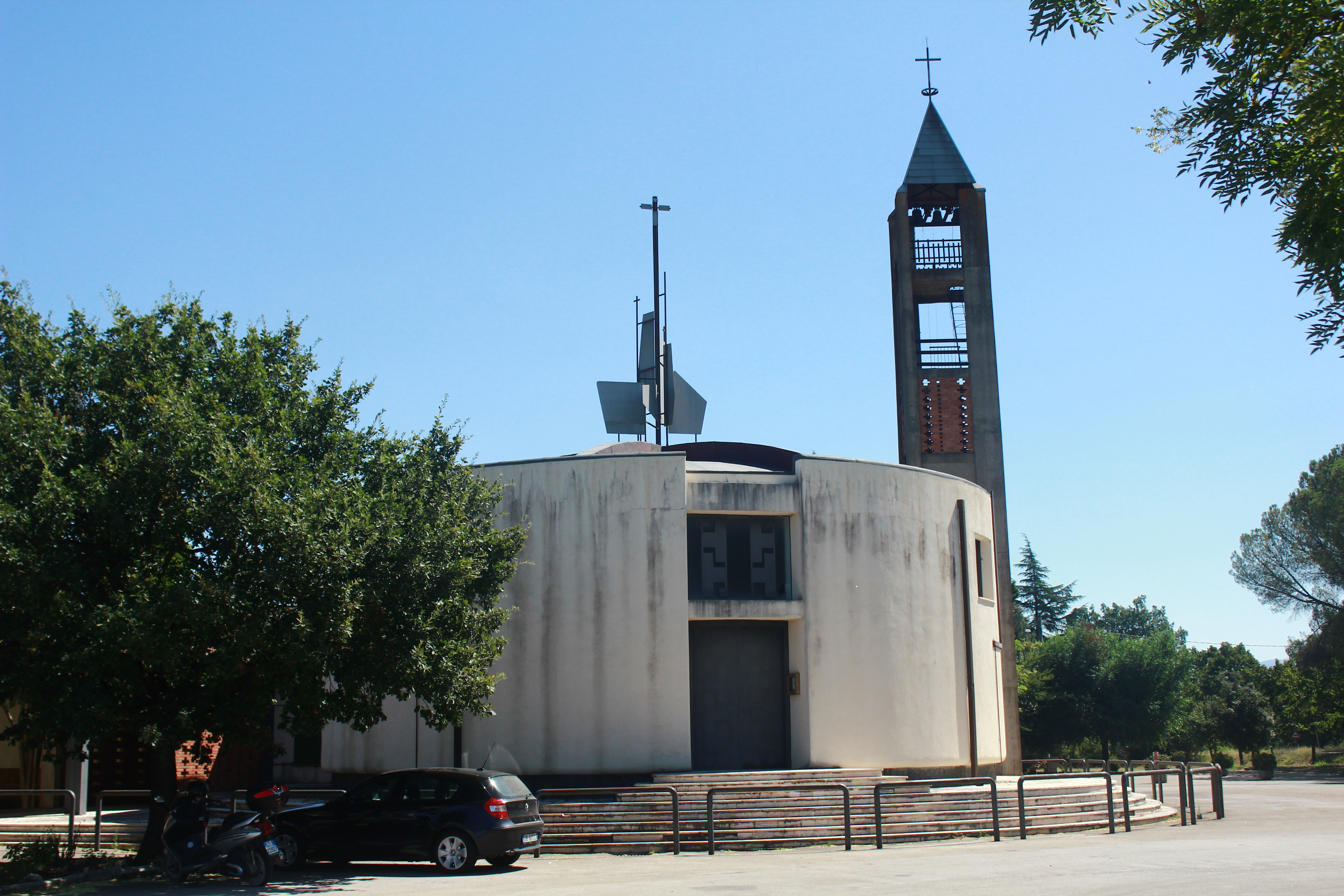
- The church of Saint Petronilla

- Location of Borgo Santa Rita in Italy
- Coordinates: 42°57′27″N 11°23′9″E
- Country: Italy
- Region: Tuscany
- Province: Grosseto (GR)
- Comune: Cinigiano
- Elevation: 102 m (335 ft)

Population (2011)
  - Total: 58
- Time zone: UTC+1 (CET)
  - Summer (DST): UTC+2 (CEST)
- Postal code: 58044
- Dialing code: (+39) 0564

Borgo Santa Rita is a village in Tuscany, central Italy, administratively a frazione of the comune of Cinigiano, province of Grosseto. At the time of the 2001 census its population amounted to 34.

Borgo Santa Rita is about 33 km from Grosseto and 10 km from Cinigiano. It is situated along the provincial road which links the Grosseto-Siena highway to the Mount Amiata. The whole territory was property of the counts of Poggio alle Mura during the Middle Ages, but the modern village was born as a result of the land reform in the early 1960s.

== Geography ==
Borgo Santa Rita is located in the northern part of the municipality of Cinigiano, in the Ombrone valley at the western edge of the Val d'Orcia. The hamlet is bordered to the north by the Orcia River, marking the boundary with the municipality of Montalcino, and to the west by the Ombrone River; it is bounded to the east by the Ribusieri stream and to the south by low hills, and borders the settlements of Paganico, Sasso d'Ombrone, Cinigiano, Sant'Angelo Scalo, Montenero d'Orcia, and Monte Antico.

== History ==
The area of the village has been inhabited since the medieval period, when it formed part of the estates of the lords of Poggio alle Mura, near Montalcino, who built a chapel dedicated to Saint Petronilla for the local rural population.

The settlement developed primarily in the 20th century following the agrarian reform implemented by the Ente Maremma from 1951, and was conceived as a service centre for the scattered farms of the rural area between the Ombrone River and the Val d'Orcia. An initial project drafted in 1955 by architect Luigi Vagnetti, which envisaged a village named Santa Petronilla, was never realised.

In 1960 a new plan was commissioned to architect Carlo Boccianti, and the site of Piani Rossi along the Cipressino Provincial Road was selected. The village, inaugurated in 1964 and later named Borgo Santa Rita, originally consisted of a church and a central building housing public services, shops, and a bar. In subsequent decades it expanded with a small residential area and, in the late 1990s, became the main artisan and industrial district of the municipality of Cinigiano.

== Main sights ==
=== Church of Saint Petronilla ===
The village church retains the dedication of the former chapel of Saint Petronilla and serves as the principal place of worship for the settlement. It was designed in conjunction with the construction of the modern service village by architect Carlo Boccianti in 1960, and built between 1963 and 1964. The church has a circular plan and is characterised by "the austere purity of its cylindrical exposed-concrete volume". The interior furnishings were also designed by Boccianti.

=== Former chapel of Saint Petronilla ===
The chapel of Saint Petronilla is a former rural place of worship located close to the confluence of the Ombrone and Orcia rivers. It was built in the late medieval period, probably in the 14th century, as a simple chapel serving agricultural workers on an estate belonging to the lords of Poggio alle Mura. The building was enlarged in the late 16th century. Despite its isolated location, the chapel remained in use until the mid-20th century. Prolonged neglect led to severe deterioration, including the collapse of the roof.

== Sources ==
- Catalani, Barbara; Del Francia, Marco; Tombari, Giovanni (2011). Itinerari di architettura contemporanea. Grosseto e provincia. Pisa: ETS.
- Cataldi, Giancarlo; Rossi, Michela (2000). Luigi Vagnetti, architetto (Roma, 1915-1980). Disegni, progetti, opere. Florence: Alinea.
- Mangiavacchi, Fabio (2011). "La colonizzazione delle campagne maremmane. Dall'appoderamento mezzadrile ai borghi della riforma fondiaria". Architetture Grosseto (14).
- Simoncelli, Antonio Valentino (1989). La Riforma fondiaria in Maremma (1950-1965). Grosseto.

== See also ==
- Castiglioncello Bandini
- Monticello Amiata
- Poggi del Sasso
- Porrona
- Sasso d'Ombrone
