= Castle of Vicarello =

Medieval castle in Cinigiano, Tuscany, Italy

Coordinates: 42°52′58″N 11°18′28″E

- Cinigiano, Tuscany
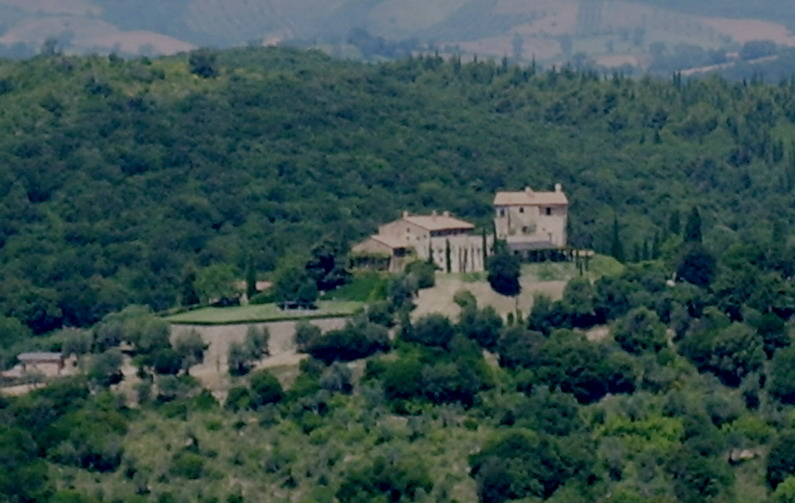
- View of the castle

Site information
- Owner: private
- Condition: In use

Site history
- Built: 13th century

The Castle of Vicarello (Italian: Castello di Vicarello) is a medieval castle in Cinigiano, Tuscany, Italy.

It is located in the territory of the frazione of Poggi del Sasso.

== History ==
The complex was built in the thirteenth century as part of the Republic of Siena, and became an important defensive structure. It was sold in the middle of the fifteenth century to the lords of the castle of Cotone, who also owned part of the nearby castle of Sabatina. During the Renaissance period, redevelopment work was carried out that led to the overlapping of newer stylistic elements with the existing medieval ones. In the mid-sixteenth century, the castle became part of the territory administered by the Grand Duchy of Tuscany, and remained in private ownership. Restorations were completed at the end of the twentieth century.

== Current ==
The castle is currently operated as a hotel and farm. One of the two original stone square towers is well-preserved. The buildings that make up the complex are organized around an inner courtyard, which is accessed through an archway; the walls are completely covered in stone. Not far from the castle was an old church, now deconsecrated and used as a private residence, which is recognizable by its bell tower.
