= Davide Lazzeretti =

Italian preacher

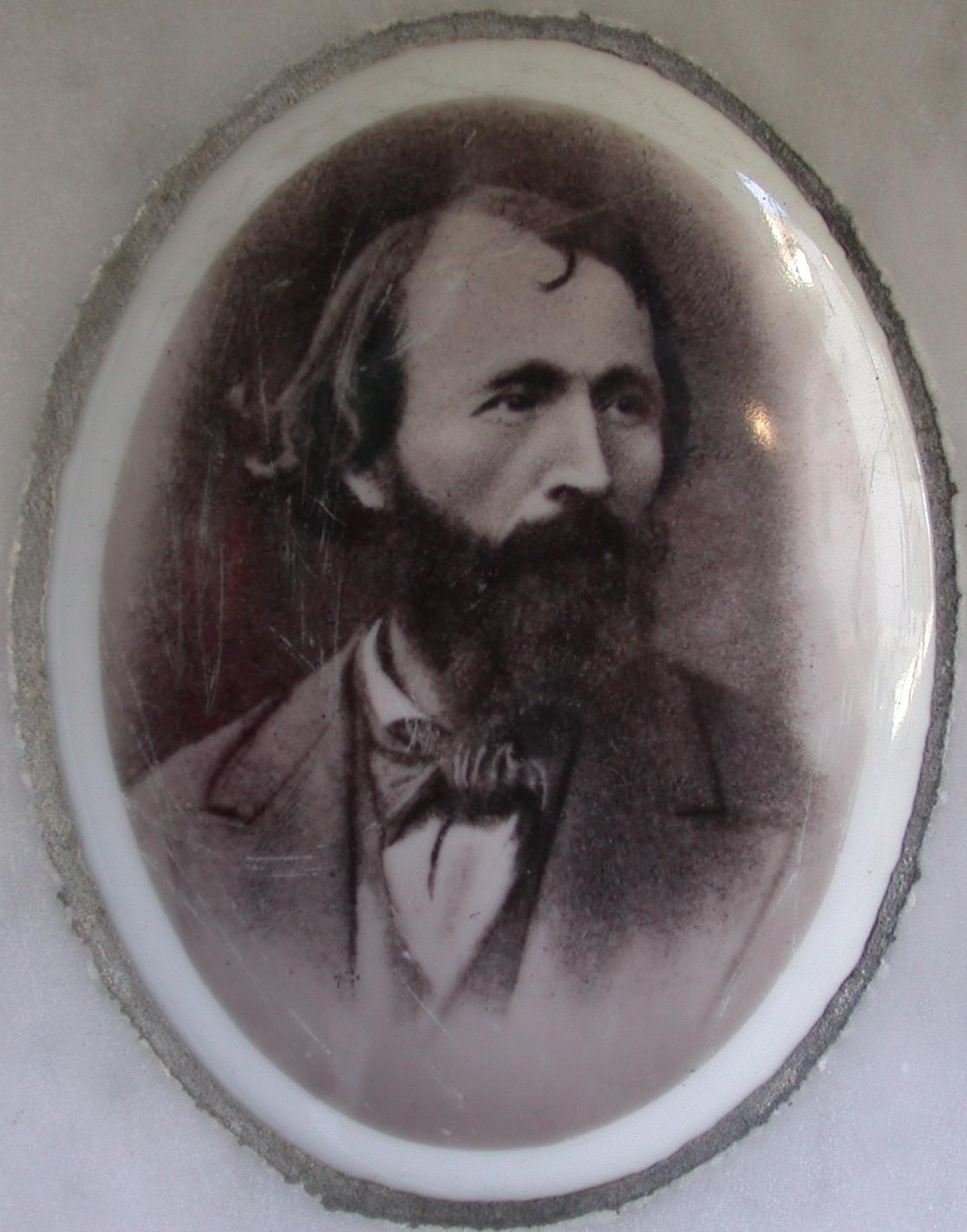
Davide Lazzaretti portrait

Davide Lazzaretti (6 November 1834 – 18 August 1878) was an Italian preacher known as the founder of the religious movement of Jurisdavidism.

== Life ==
Davide Lazzeretti was born on 6 November 1834 near Arcidosso, a small town in the Province of Grosseto in the Italian region of Tuscany. In his early life, Lazzaretti worked as a wagoner and was known as the town drunk. In 1860, Lazzaretti participated in nine months of military service, working with Garibaldi in a military campaign opposing the Church State Army.

In 1868, Lazzaretti had his self-proclaimed prophetic meeting with the Virgin Mary. This led him to live the life of a hermit, modeled after the life of St. Francis. He gained many followers among the peasants around Mount Amiata and Mount Labbro. He began sporting a tattoo of a key, symbolizing St. Peter, on his forehead. At Mount Labbro, he gathered a community of followers, about 80 families. He would disappear for weeks at a time, returning with new prophecies and visions. This continued until 1870 when Lazzaretti created three religiously oriented organizations: the Holy League, the Institute of Penitentiary Hermits and Penitents, and the Society of Christian Families. From 1873 to 1877, he traveled three times to France. He traveled to Rome and attempted to meet with the Pope. He postulated he would become the leader of a Divine Republic consisting of the three Latin peoples of Spain, France and Italy. On the 18th of August, a few days after the date he predicted the Divine Republic would start, he led a crowd of his followers, dressed in peasant garb to the town, where the local policemen shot him dead.

The David Lazzaretti Study Center in Arcidosso, located in Italy, is named after him.

== See also ==
- Jurisdavidism
