= Zancona =

- Frazione
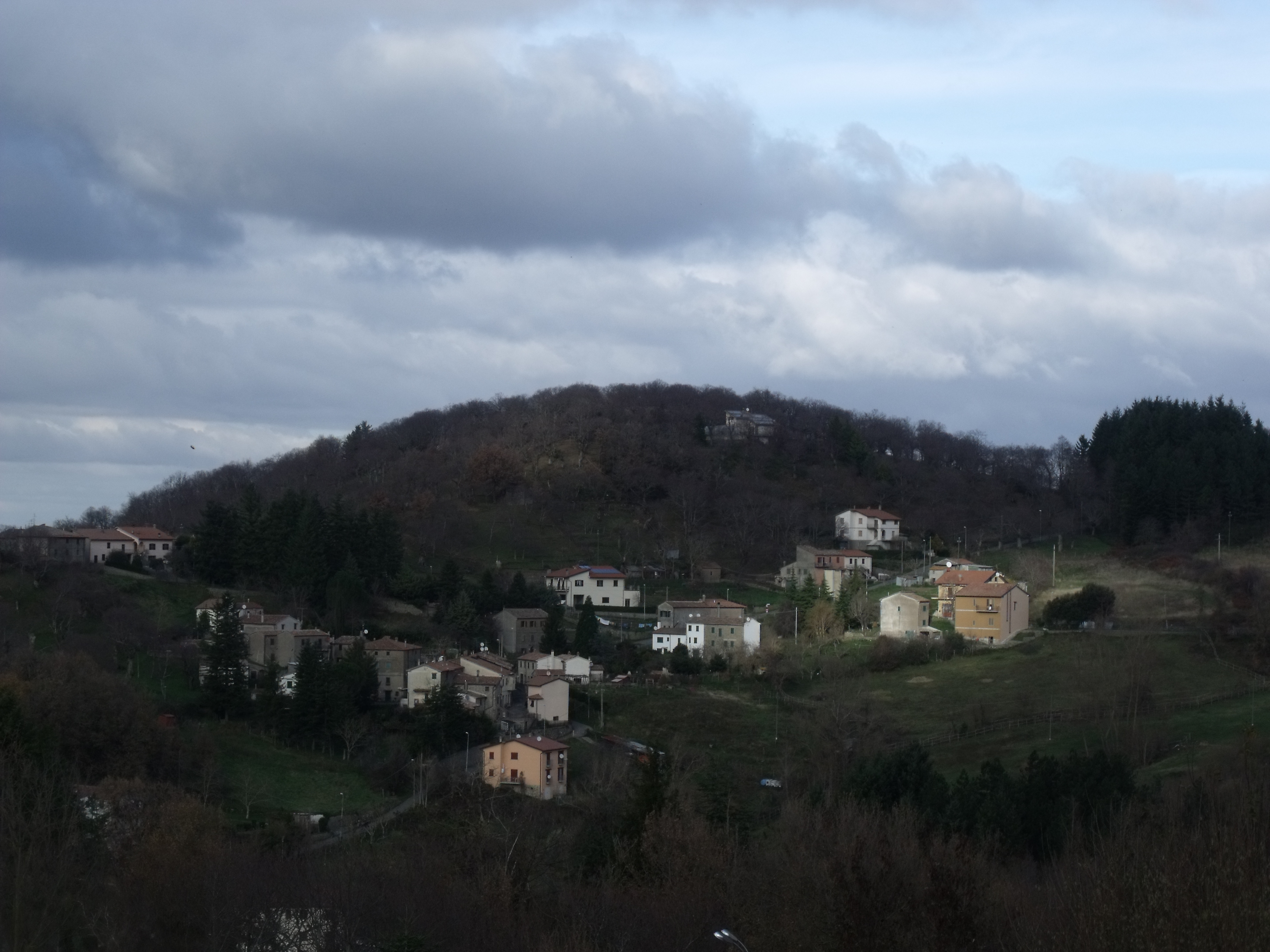
- View of Zancona

- Location of Zancona in Italy
- Coordinates: 42°51′30″N 11°31′28″E
- Country: Italy
- Region: Tuscany
- Province: Grosseto (GR)
- Comune: Arcidosso
- Elevation: 775 m (2,543 ft)

Population (2001)
  - Total: 80
- Demonym: Zanconai
- Time zone: UTC+1 (CET)
  - Summer (DST): UTC+2 (CEST)
- Postal code: 58031
- Dialing code: 0564

Zancona (Italian: [dzaŋˈkoːna]) is a village in Tuscany, central Italy, administratively a frazione of the comune of Arcidosso, province of Grosseto, in the area of Mount Amiata. At the time of the 2001 census its population amounted to 80.

== Geography ==
Zancona is about 56 km from Grosseto and 3 km from Arcidosso. It is situated along the river of the same name, in the valley of Monte Labbro. Zancona is included in the Monte Labbro Nature Reserve, which is known for its wildlife park (Parco faunistico del Monte Amiata).

=== Subdivisions ===
The village is composed by three wards: Chiesa (lower part), Piazza (centre) and Puscina (upper part).

The territory of Zancona includes also the village of Le Macchie and the hamlets of Case del Ponte, Case Sallustri, Giunco, La Croce, Le Case, Mossa dei Cavalli, Poggio Zancona, Pratocupo, Romitorio, Rondinelli, Torricella, Vado di Capretto.

== Main sights ==
- Church of Sant'Anna (19th century), situated in the lower part of the village, it was built in the early 19th century and it is included in the parish of Arcidosso.
- Devotional crosses in Case del Ponte and La Croce, placed by preacher Baldassarre Audiberti in the early 19th century.

== Bibliography ==
- (in Italian) Emanuele Repetti, «Zancona», Dizionario Geografico Fisico Storico della Toscana, 1833–1846.
- Carlo Morganti, Susanna Nanni, Itinerari a piedi nel comune di Arcidosso. Zaino in spalla alla scoperta del territorio, Arcidosso, C&P Adver Effigi, 2008, pp. 47–49.

== See also ==
- Bagnoli, Arcidosso
- Le Macchie
- Montelaterone
- Salaiola
- San Lorenzo, Arcidosso
- Stribugliano
