= Pia de' Tolomei (disambiguation) =

Pia de' Tolomei was an Italian noblewoman from Siena identified as "la Pia," a minor character in Dante's Divine Comedy who was murdered by her husband.

Pia de' Tolomei may also refer to:

- Pia de' Tolomei (opera), by Gaetano Donizetti, 1837
- Pia de' Tolomei (Rossetti), a 1868 painting
- several other artistic works listed at Pia de' Tolomei#In popular culture
