= Stribugliano =

- Frazione
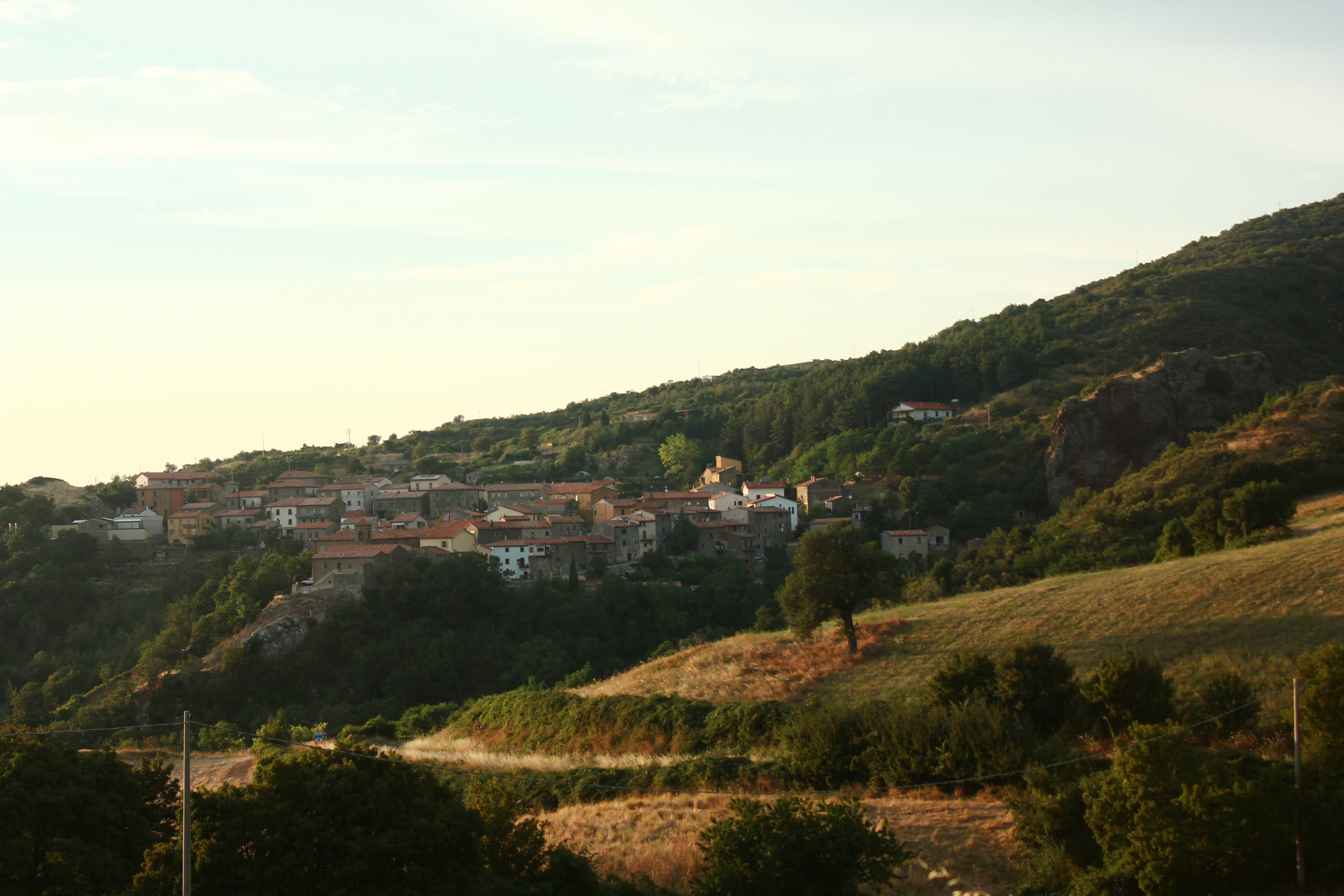
- View of Stribugliano

- Location of Stribugliano in Italy
- Coordinates: 42°51′01″N 11°27′38″E
- Country: Italy
- Region: Tuscany
- Province: Grosseto (GR)
- Comune: Arcidosso
- Elevation: 775 m (2,543 ft)

Population (2011)
  - Total: 212
- Demonym: Stribuglianesi
- Time zone: UTC+1 (CET)
  - Summer (DST): UTC+2 (CEST)
- Postal code: 58030
- Dialing code: (+39) 0564

Stribugliano is a village in Tuscany, central Italy, administratively a frazione of the comune of Arcidosso, province of Grosseto, in the area of Mount Amiata. At the time of the 2001 census its population amounted to 253.

Stribugliano is about 45 km from Grosseto and 18 km from Arcidosso, and it is situated on a peak of Monte Buceto above the valley of Melacce.

== Main sights ==
- Church of San Giovanni Battista, main parish church of the village.
- Pieve del Ballatoio (12th century), mentioned in a bull of Pope Clement III in 1188, it's now a farmhouse dating back to the 16th century.
- Palazzo dei Marchesi La Greca, ancient palace situated in the main square of the village, its façade is decorated with the coats of arms of the marquis La Greca.
- Abbandonato farmhouse, ancient hospital that was mentioned in an act of 1153.

== Bibliography ==
- Aldo Mazzolai, Guida della Maremma. Percorsi tra arte e natura, Le Lettere, Florence, 1997.

== See also ==
- Bagnoli, Arcidosso
- Le Macchie
- Montelaterone
- San Lorenzo, Arcidosso
- Salaiola
- Zancona
