= Bagnoli, Arcidosso =

Bagnoli
- Frazione
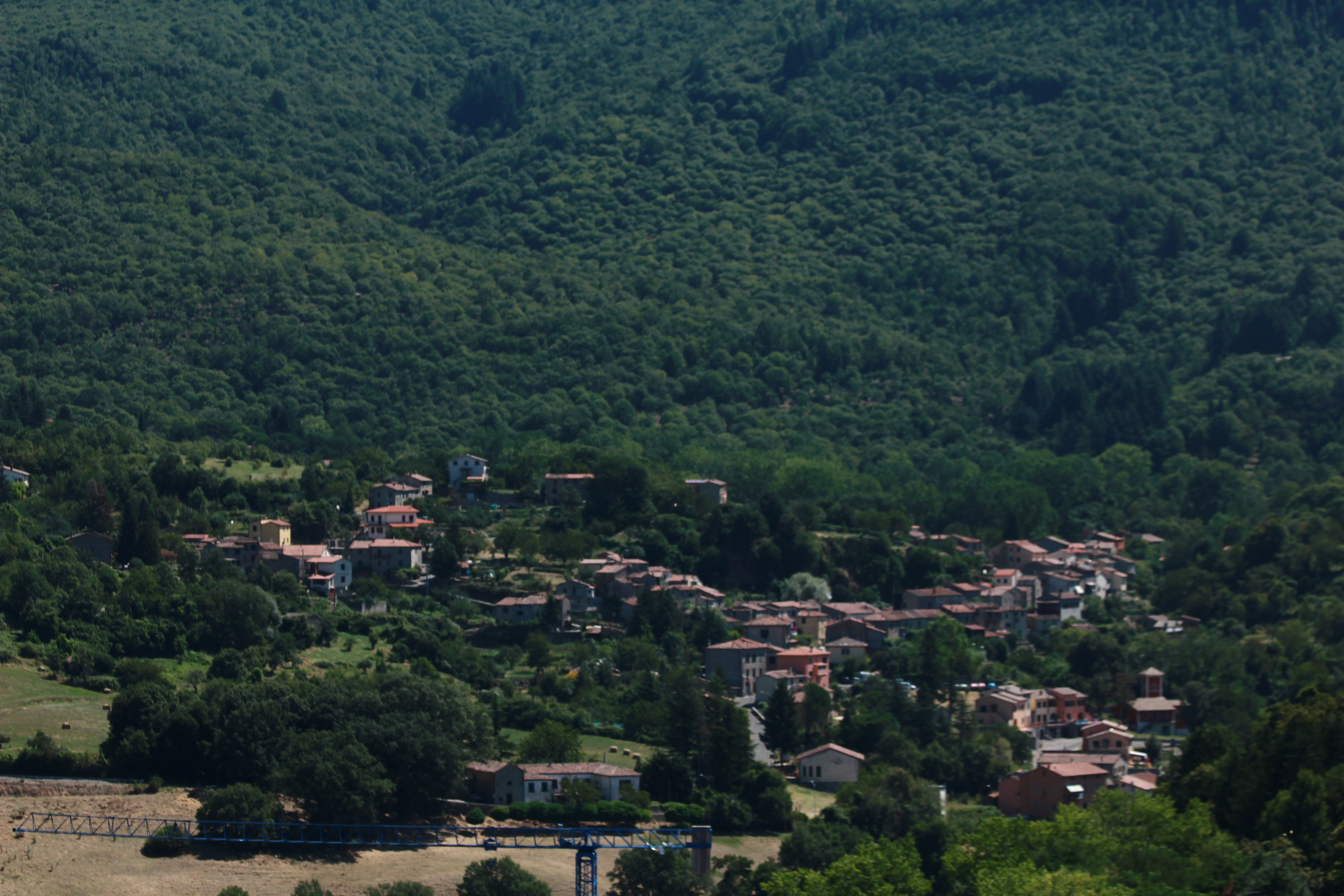
- View of Bagnoli

- Location of Bagnoli in Italy
- Coordinates: 42°52′22″N 11°33′03″E
- Country: Italy
- Region: Tuscany
- Province: Grosseto (GR)
- Comune: Arcidosso
- Elevation: 672 m (2,205 ft)

Population (2001)
  - Total: 359
- Demonym: Bagnolai
- Time zone: UTC+1 (CET)
  - Summer (DST): UTC+2 (CEST)
- Postal code: 58031
- Dialing code: 0564

Bagnoli (Italian: [baɲˈɲɔːli]) is a village in Tuscany, central Italy, administratively a frazione of the comune of Arcidosso, province of Grosseto, in the area of Mount Amiata. At the time of the 2001 census its population amounted to 359.

Bagnoli is about 58 km from Grosseto and just 1 km from Arcidosso. It is composed of several other wards and hamlets: Grappolini, Capannelle, Piane del Maturo, Canali, Capenti and Case Nuove.

== Main sights ==
- Church of Santa Mustiola, main church of the village, it was built in 12th century and restructured in 1885
- Chapel of Natività, old chapel in Canali hamlet
- Ancient woolen mill of Bagnoli
- Waterfall of Acqua d'Alto, a waterfall about 20 meters high

== Bibliography ==
- Agostino Morganti, La storia, il paese, la gente: Arcidosso e il suo territorio nelle cartoline degli anni 1900/1960, Arcidosso, C&P Adver Effigi, 2006.

== See also ==
- Le Macchie
- Montelaterone
- Salaiola
- San Lorenzo, Arcidosso
- Stribugliano
- Zancona
