= Cinigiano =

- Comune
- Comune di Cinigiano
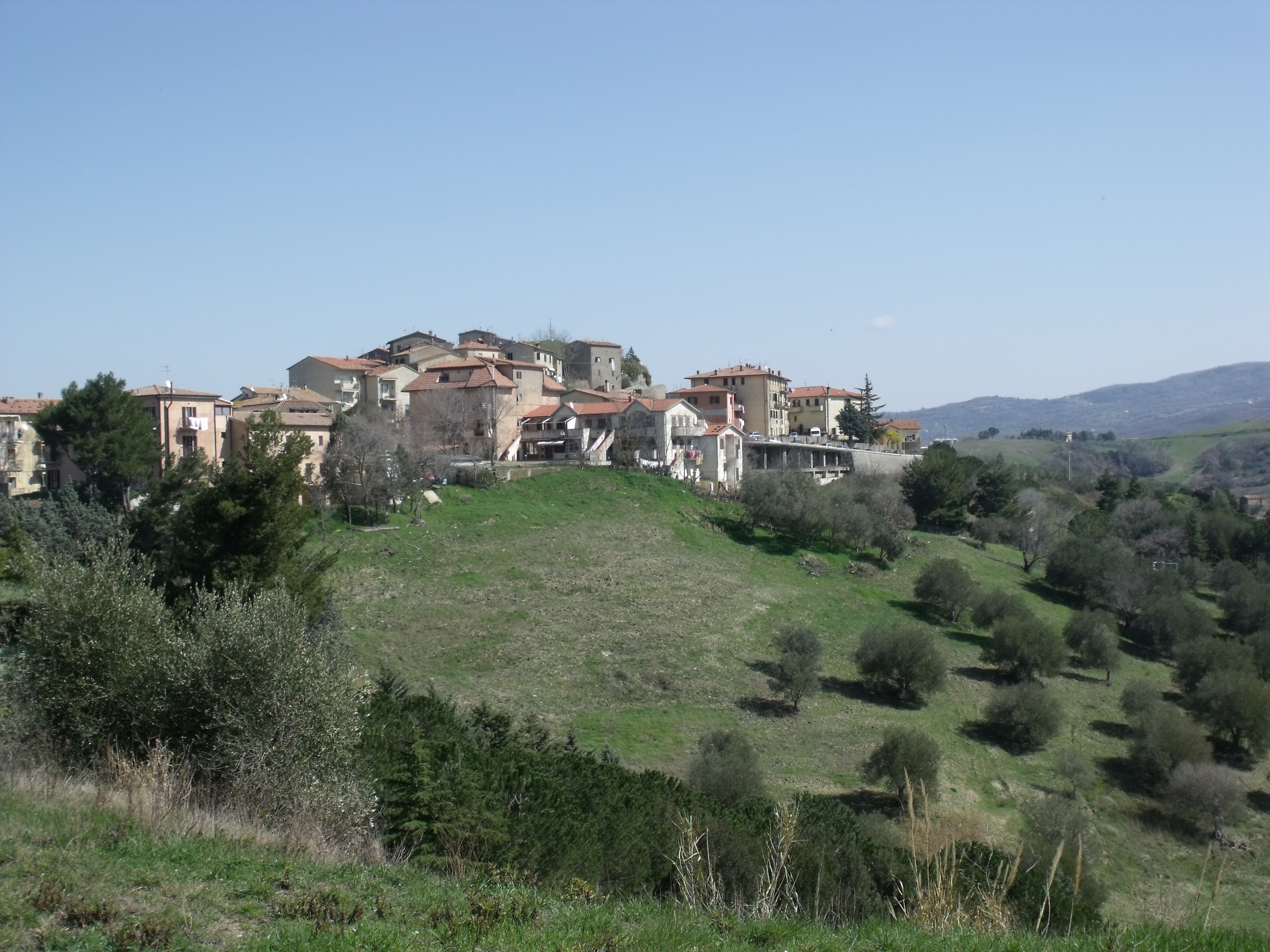
- Panorama of Cinigiano

- Coat of arms

- Location within Italy Location within Tuscany
- Coordinates: 42°53′28″N 11°23′33″E
- Country: Italy
- Region: Tuscany
- Province: Grosseto (GR)
- Frazioni: Borgo Santa Rita, Castiglioncello Bandini, Monticello Amiata, Poggi del Sasso, Porrona, Sasso d'Ombrone

Government
  - Mayor: Romina Sani

Area
  - Total: 161.55 km^{2} (62.37 sq mi)
- Elevation: 324 m (1,063 ft)

Population (30 June 2017)
  - Total: 2,568
  - Density: 15.90/km^{2} (41.17/sq mi)
- Demonym: Cinigianesi
- Time zone: UTC+1 (CET)
  - Summer (DST): UTC+2 (CEST)
- Postal code: 58044
- Dialing code: 0564
- Patron saint: St. Michael
- Saint day: September 29
- Website: Official website

Cinigiano is a comune (municipality) in the Province of Grosseto in the Italian region Tuscany, located about 100 kilometres (62 mi) south of Florence and about 25 kilometres (16 mi) northeast of Grosseto.

Cinigiano borders the following municipalities: Arcidosso, Campagnatico, Castel del Piano, Civitella Paganico, Montalcino.

== Government ==
=== Frazioni ===
The municipality is formed by the municipal seat of Cinigiano and the villages (frazioni) of Borgo Santa Rita, Castiglioncello Bandini, Monticello Amiata, Poggi del Sasso, Porrona and Sasso d'Ombrone.

=== List of mayors ===
Mayor	Term start	Term end	Party
Moreno Canuti	1985	1995	Italian Communist Party/Democratic Party of the Left
Giorgio Galassi	1995	1999	Independent (centre-left)
Marzio Scheggi	1999	2009	Democrats of the Left
Silvana Totti	2009	2014	Independent (centre-left)
Romina Sani	2014	Incumbent	Civic
