= 1874 Italian general election =

- 8 November 1874 (first round); 15 November 1874 (second round)

All 508 seats in the Chamber of Deputies 255 seats needed for a majority
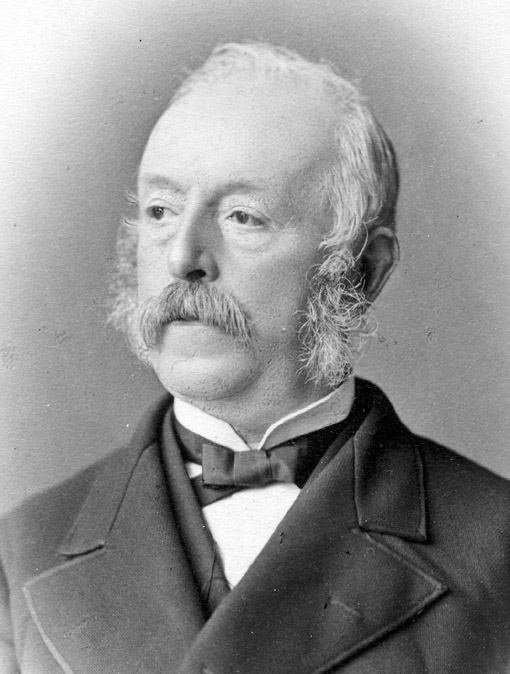

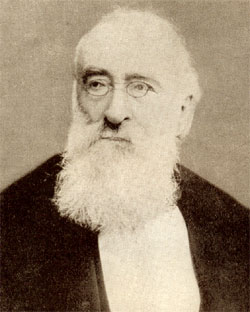
	Majority party	Minority party
Leader	Marco Minghetti	Agostino Depretis
Party	Historical Right	Historical Left
Leader's seat	Legnago	Stradella
Seats won	276	232
Seat change	▲43	▲37
- Results by electoral college
Prime Minister before election
Marco Minghetti
Historical Right
Elected Prime Minister
Marco Minghetti
Historical Right

General elections were held in Italy on 8 November, with a second round of voting on 15 November. They were a snap election, called by Prime Minister Marco Minghetti to strengthen his majority.

Only 571,939 men of a total population of around 28 million were entitled to vote. Right-wing candidates emerged as the largest bloc in Parliament with around 48% of the seats in Parliament. They were largely aristocrats representing rentiers from the north of the country, and held moderate political views including loyalty to the crown and low government spending. This was the last election in which the Historical Right faction emerged as the largest.

== Campaign ==
Prime Minister Marco Minghetti and his influent Minister of the Treasury Quintino Sella were involved into an ambitious program of budget which needed a strong majority, for which they tried to oblige the Independents to choose their side, beginning to build a two-party system as in the United Kingdom. However, in the Italian non-partisan political system, hugely affected by localism and corruption, their bet was equivalent to an all-in that afterwards they lost.

The election did not give to Minghetti the advantage he was hoping, especially for the high support to the opposition in Southern Italy. His government survived, but the bipolarisation of the Parliament he had imposed, strengthened the Historical Left so that it could take the leadership of the country. Two years later, MPs from Tuscany became dissatisfied with the government after it refused to intervene in the financial problems of Florence. The government was defeated on a vote on nationalising railways on 18 March 1876 and was forced to resign. As a result, Agostino Depretis, leader of the left-wing bloc, became Prime Minister, with 414 of the 508 MPs supporting the government. Early elections were held in November.

== Parties and leaders ==
Party	Ideology	Leader
Historical Right	Conservatism	Marco Minghetti
Historical Left	Liberalism	Agostino Depretis

== Results ==
Party	Votes	%	Seats	+/–
Historical Right			276	+43
Historical Left			232	+37
Total			508	0
Valid votes	306,903	96.35		
Invalid/blank votes	11,614	3.65		
Total votes	318,517	100.00		
Registered voters/turnout	571,939	55.69		
Source: Nohlen & Stöver
