= Le Macchie =

- Frazione
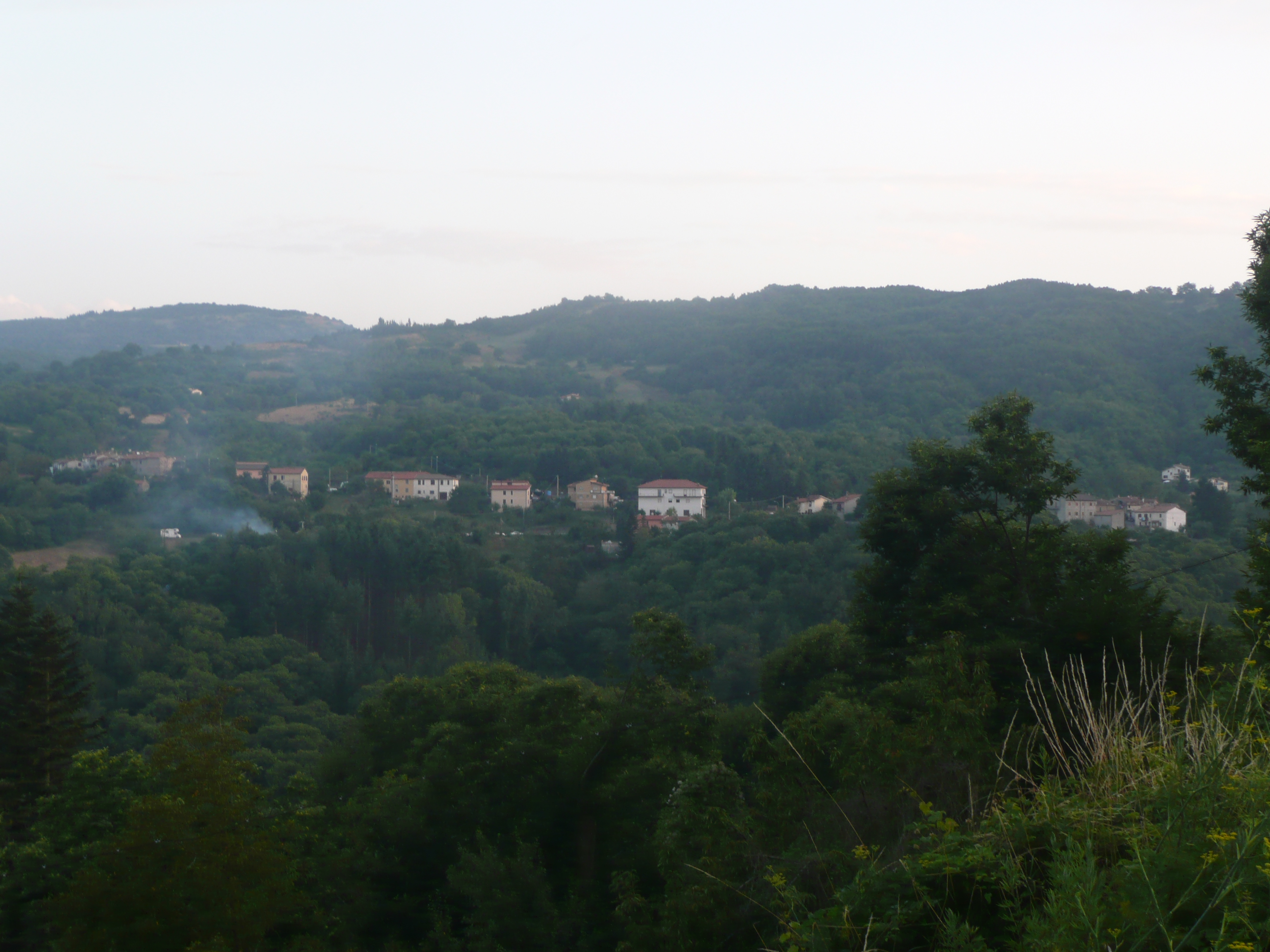

- Location of Le Macchie in Italy
- Coordinates: 42°51′11″N 11°31′13″E
- Country: Italy
- Region: Tuscany
- Province: Grosseto (GR)
- Comune: Arcidosso
- Elevation: 750 m (2,460 ft)

Population (2001)
  - Total: 101
- Demonym: Macchiaioli
- Time zone: UTC+1 (CET)
  - Summer (DST): UTC+2 (CEST)
- Postal code: 58031
- Dialing code: (+39) 0564

Le Macchie is a village in Tuscany, central Italy, administratively a frazione of the comune of Arcidosso, province of Grosseto, in the area of Mount Amiata. At the time of the 2001 census its population amounted to 101.

== Geography ==
Le Macchie is about 58 km from Grosseto and 4 km from Arcidosso. It is situated along the Zancona river, near the village of the same name, in the valley of Monte Labbro.

The village is composed by three hamlets: Macchie, Pastorelli and Poggio Marco.

== See also ==
- Bagnoli, Arcidosso
- Montelaterone
- San Lorenzo, Arcidosso
- Salaiola
- Stribugliano
- Zancona
