= Arcidosso =

- Comune
- Comune di Arcidosso
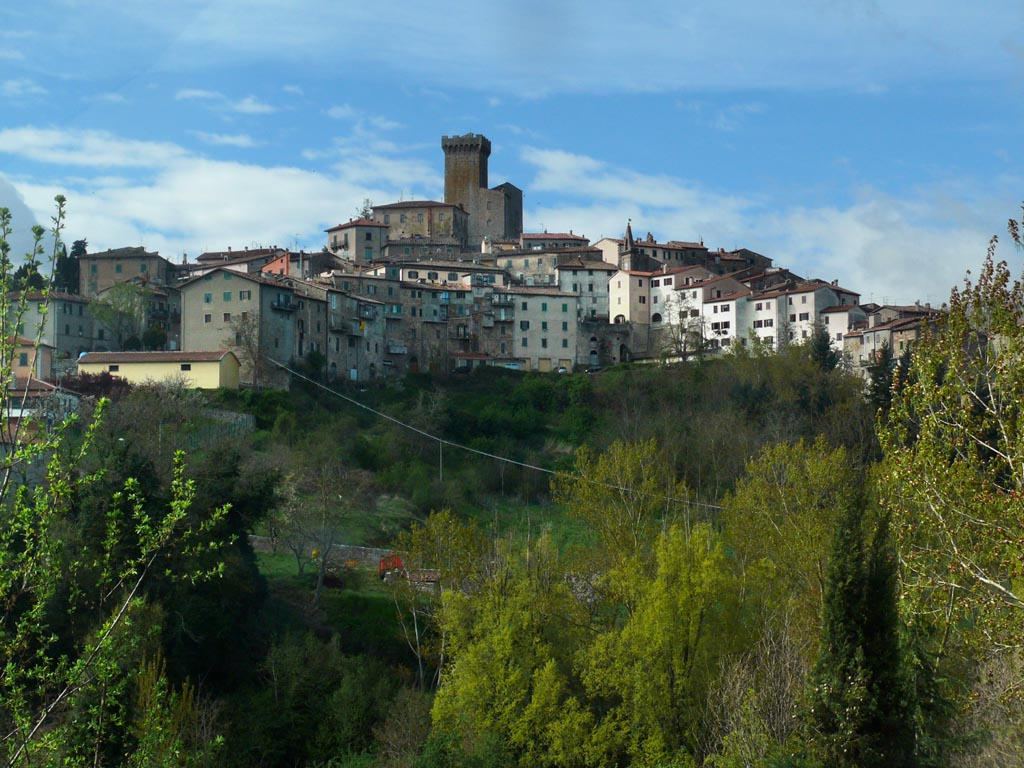

- Coat of arms

- Location of Arcidosso in Italy Arcidosso (Tuscany)
- Coordinates: 42°52′N 11°32′E
- Country: Italy
- Region: Tuscany
- Province: Grosseto (GR)
- Frazioni: Bagnoli, Macchie, Montelaterone, Salaiola, San Lorenzo, Stribugliano, Zancona

Government
  - Mayor: Jacopo Marini

Area
  - Total: 93.26 km^{2} (36.01 sq mi)
- Elevation: 679 m (2,228 ft)

Population (1 January 2022)
  - Total: 4,350
  - Density: 46.6/km^{2} (121/sq mi)
- Demonym: Arcidossìni
- Time zone: UTC+1 (CET)
  - Summer (DST): UTC+2 (CEST)
- Postal code: 58031
- Dialing code: 0564
- Website: Official website

Arcidosso is a comune (municipality) in the Province of Grosseto in the Italian region of Tuscany, located about 100 kilometres (62 mi) south of Florence and about 35 kilometres (22 mi) northeast of Grosseto and near the town of Montalcino.

== History ==
The first certain documentation of the existence of the settlement of Arcidosso is from the year 860, when it is said to belong to the Abbey of San Salvatore. In 1331, Guidoriccio da Fogliano besieged it for four months with an army of 4,000 soldiers and 400 horsemen, until it surrendered. After the fall of the Republic of Siena in 1556, it passed under the Grand Duchy of Tuscany. Cosimo I de' Medici established many outlying offices here.

Following the Leopoldina Reformation of 1786, there was a remarkable population increase and the number of Arcidosso's citizens quadrupled in about 100 years. Arcidosso thus became historically the most important political and administrative center in the Monte Amiata area.

== Geography ==
Frazioni

The municipality is formed by the municipal seat of Arcidosso and the villages (frazioni) of Bagnoli, Montelaterone, Le Macchie, Salaiola, San Lorenzo, Stribugliano and Zancona.

== Main sights ==
=== Aldobrandeschi castle ===
The construction of the first nucleus of the castle, around which the town would develop, dates from about the year 1000. From the 12th to the 14th centuries it was a stronghold of the Aldobrandeschi and a bulwark against invasion of the Amiata territory by Siena. The north side of the complex is characterized by a tower that rises beyond the roof of the highest building in the compound. The top of the tower is crowned by a series of blind arches resting on shelves. The fortress, recently restored, is used today as a space for cultural activities. From the top of the tower there is a splendid panorama of Mount Amiata.

=== Historic centre ===
The historic centre of Arcidosso, one of the most striking in Amiata, develops in a long pyramid shape along the plateau dominated by the castle. Only three gates of the old medieval walls remain, of which two are original – the Porta di Castello, and the Porta Talassese which faces towards the sea. From here, going down towards Codaccio, is the Porta dell’Orologio, built in 1851 to replace the Porta di Mezzo.

=== Other buildings ===
Arcidosso has several medieval churches, most notably the church of the Madonna dell'Incoronata, where pilgrims journeyed to pray for the end of the great plague; the church of San Niccolò, patron saint of Arcidosso, and the church of San Leonardo. These churches contain medieval frescoes, paintings and icons. Local legend has it that Merlin, the enchanter associated with the Arthurian cycle, lived in a cave in San Lorenzo, a village between Arcidosso and neighbouring Castel del Piano.

== People ==
- Apollonio Apolloni, physician, patriot
- Telemaco Ferrini, lawyer, journalist, politician
- Davide Lazzeretti, preacher
- Isidoro Maggi, politician

== See also ==
- Monte Amiata
