= Pari Mill =

Historic 17th-century watermill in Civitella Paganico, Tuscany

Mulino di Pari
- Mulino dei Pari
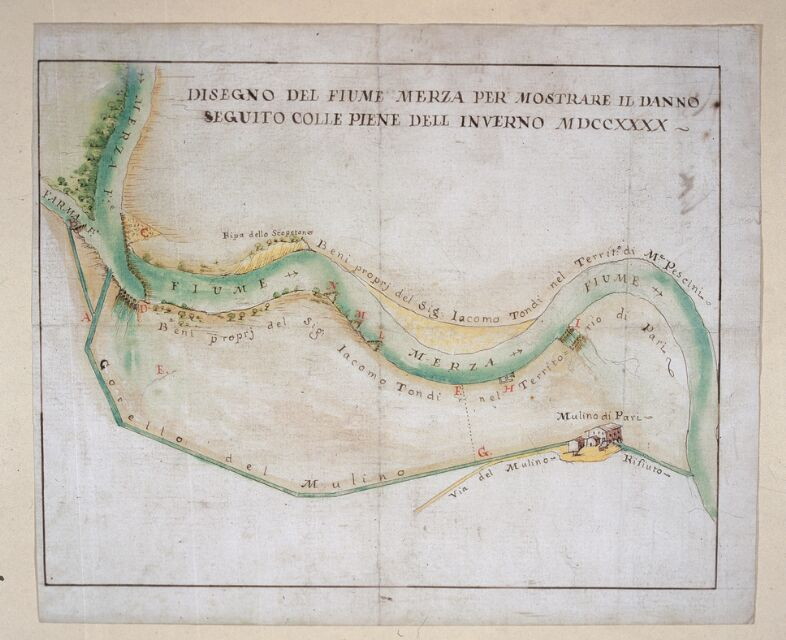
- Drawing of the Merse River showing flood damage (1741)
- Interactive map of the Mulino di Pari area

General information
- Type: Watermill
- Architectural style: Rural Tuscan
- Location: Civitella Paganico, Grosseto, Tuscany, Italy
- Coordinates: 43.0780093°N 11.3568840°E
- Opened: Documented since 1672
- Owner: Private

Technical details
- Material: Stone

The Pari Mill (Italian: Mulino di Pari or Mulino dei Pari) is a historic watermill located in the municipality of Civitella Paganico, in the province of Grosseto, Tuscany, Italy. Situated near the medieval village of Pari, at the confluence of the Merse and Ombrone rivers, the structure historically served as a grain mill and fulling mill, powered by the Merse River.

== Origins and historical context ==
The origins of the Mulino di Pari are uncertain. Although local tradition attributes it to the early medieval period (10th century), the earliest known written documentation dates to 1672. In a report from that year, an official from the Grand Duchy of Tuscany described the mill as community property, leased to the Fondi family, and equipped with three millstones and a fulling machine (gualchiera). It supplied flour not only to Pari but also to neighboring towns.

The location along the Merse River, in a historically strategic area with abundant water sources, suggests the likelihood of earlier milling activity. However, no specific medieval documents confirm its existence before the 17th century. The mill likely gained importance during the transition from Sienese to Medici and later Lorraine rule.

== Early modern period and the 1741 flood ==
In the winter of 1740–1741, the mill suffered severe damage from a flood. Grand Ducal engineer Pier Antonio Montucci documented the destruction of the mill's wooden dam (steccaia) and the interruption of water supply to the channel (gorello) that powered the machinery. A temporary diversion was created using water from the nearby Farma stream until the dam could be rebuilt.

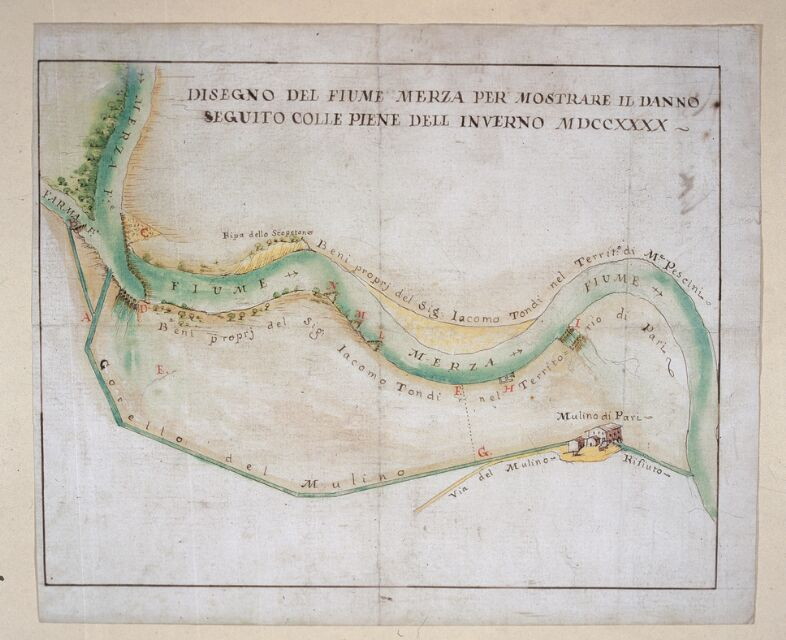
Drawing of the Merse River showing the damage caused by the winter floods of 1741 (Pier Antonio Montucci).

Montucci's report included a detailed watercolor plan showing the damaged dam, the water channels, and the three-arched stone building of the mill. These records provide a valuable technical and architectural snapshot of an 18th-century Tuscan mill complex.

Throughout the 18th and 19th centuries, the mill remained in use. An 1893 hydraulic survey recorded a water drop (salto) of 5.55 meters and a flow rate of 121 liters per second. The original dam had by then been replaced by a rudimentary stone structure (sassaia). Despite modifications, the mill retained its triple horizontal wheel layout and continued functioning as a rural production hub.

== Decline and restoration ==
With modernization and the rise of electric milling, the Mulino di Pari gradually declined. It likely ceased grinding operations during or shortly after World War II. A document from May 1944 confirms the mill was requisitioned for emergency flour production during the war. Afterward, the structure was used as a rural dwelling but eventually fell into disrepair.

In the early 2000s, the building was restored and repurposed as a bed and breakfast. The renovation preserved the original stonework, vaulted ground floor arches, and internal layout, adapting the space for hospitality use while respecting historical integrity.

== Historical and cultural significance ==
The Mulino di Pari is a rare example of a large-scale community-owned watermill in southern Tuscany. Its integration of grain milling and fulling reflects the mixed agricultural and textile economy of the region. The 1741 Montucci documents, including both the narrative and plan, are significant resources for the study of pre-industrial hydraulic engineering.

== Bibliography ==
- M. E. Cortese, L’acqua, il grano, il ferro: Opifici idraulici medievali nel bacino Farma-Merse. Firenze: All’Insegna del Giglio, 1997.
- Archivio di Stato di Siena, map n. 238, Quattro Conservatori: 1741 drawing of the Merse and the mill of Pari.
- Stati delle anime delle parrocchie dei dintorni di Siena, 1672.
