= Dogana (disambiguation) =

Dogana is a town of San Marino, the largest settlement in the country.

Dogana may also refer to:

- Dogana (crater), a crater on Mars
- Dogana, Civitella Paganico, a village in Tuscany
- Dogana, Afghanistan, a village in Afghanistan; near Tapa, Afghanistan
- Dogana da Mar, a 17th-century counting house in Venice, Italy; now a museum
