= Civitella Marittima =

- Frazione
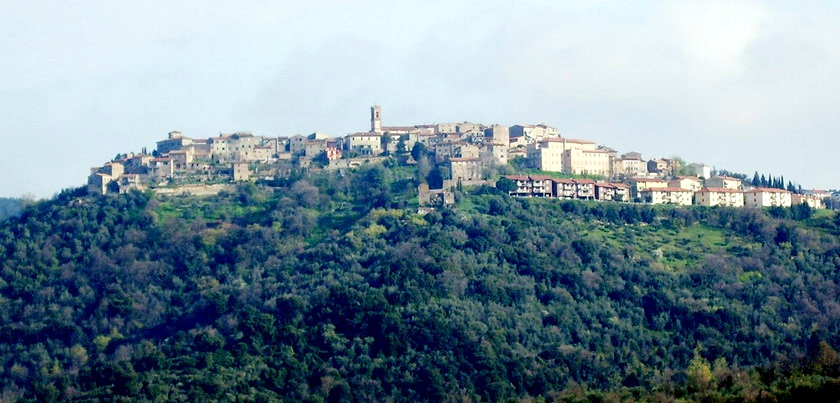
- View of Civitella Marittima

- Location of Civitella Marittima in Italy
- Coordinates: 42°59′42″N 11°16′54″E
- Country: Italy
- Region: Tuscany
- Province: Grosseto (GR)
- Comune: Civitella Paganico
- Elevation: 329 m (1,079 ft)

Population (2011)
  - Total: 529
- Demonym: Civitellini
- Time zone: UTC+1 (CET)
  - Summer (DST): UTC+2 (CEST)
- Postal code: 58045
- Dialing code: (+39) 0564

Civitella Marittima is a village in southern Tuscany, in central Italy, administratively part of the municipality of Civitella Paganico, of which it houses the seat. It is located in the valley of the Ombrone river, at 329 metres above sea level. In 2001 it had a population of 517 inhabitants.

== History ==
The town is of Etruscan origins, although the current settlement dates to around 1000 AD. It was a possession and the main centre of the Ardengheschi family, and later was occupied by the Republic of Siena until the mid-16th century, when it became part of the Grand Duchy of Tuscany.

It has medieval walls and a series of Renaissance edifices.

== See also ==
- Casale di Pari
- Dogana, Civitella Paganico
- Monte Antico
- Paganico
- Pari, Civitella Paganico
