= Fagnano =

Fagnano may refer to:

== Places ==
- Fagnano Alto, a municipality in Abruzzo, Italy
  - Ripa di Fagnano Alto, a village in Fagnano Alto
- Fagnano Castello, a municipality in Calabria, Italy
- Fagnano Olona, a municipality in Lombardy, Italy
- Lake Fagnano, in Tierra del Fuego, South America
  - Magallanes–Fagnano Fault, a continental transform fault
  - Tolhuin Lago Fagnano Airport
- Villa Fagnano, a Baroque rural palace in Tuscany, Italy

== People ==
- Giulio Carlo de' Toschi di Fagnano (1682–1766), Italian nobleman and mathematician
- Giovanni Fagnano (1715–1797), Italian churchman and mathematician, Giulio's son
- Joseph Fagnano, American professional football quarterback

== See also ==
- Fagnani
