= Paganico =

- Frazione
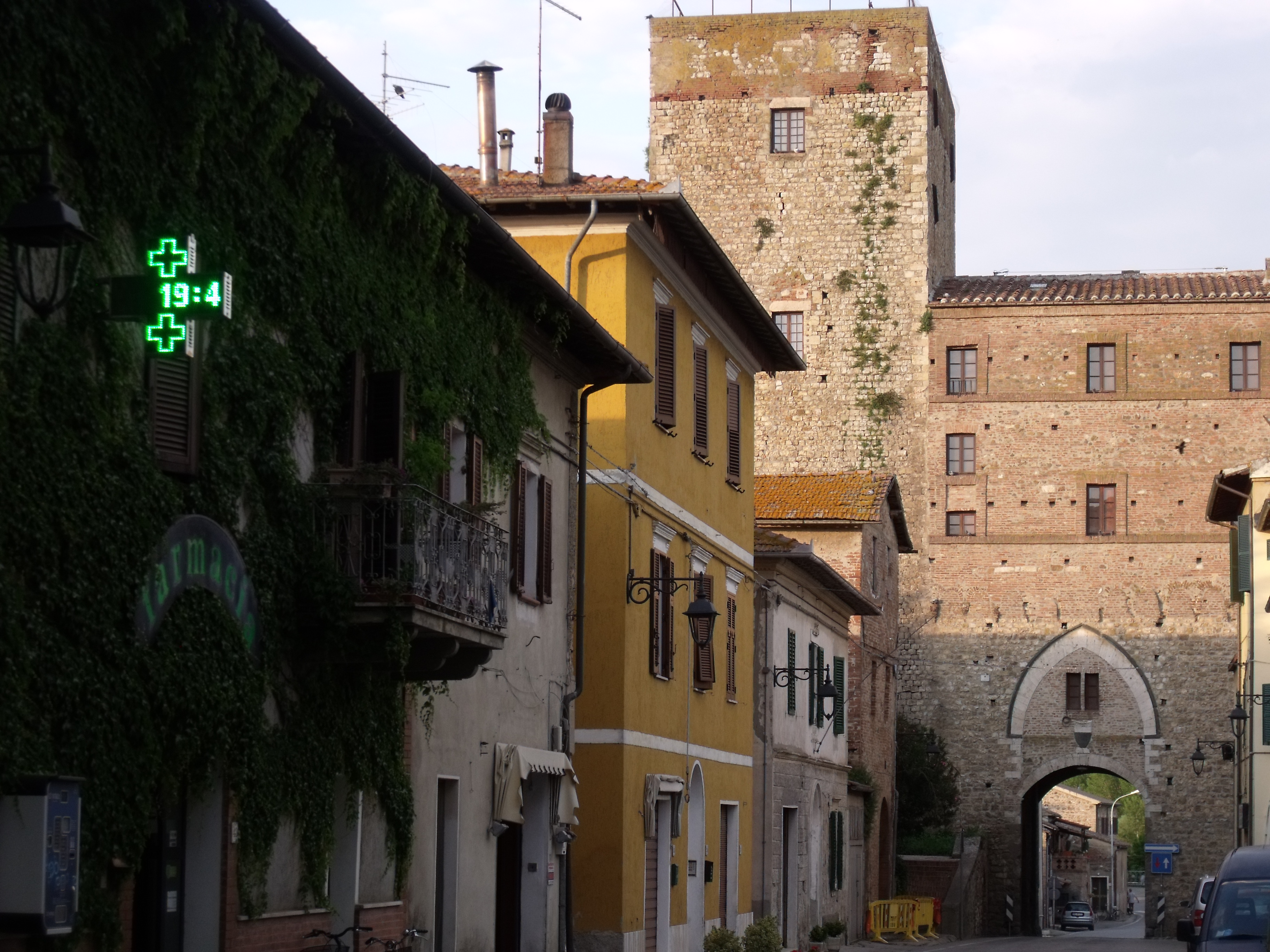
- Corso Fagarè in Paganico

- Location of Paganico in Italy
- Coordinates: 42°55′57″N 11°16′11″E
- Country: Italy
- Region: Tuscany
- Province: Grosseto (GR)
- Comune: Civitella Paganico
- Elevation: 65 m (213 ft)

Population (2011)
  - Total: 961
- Demonym: Paganichesi
- Time zone: UTC+1 (CET)
  - Summer (DST): UTC+2 (CEST)
- Postal code: 58048
- Dialing code: (+39) 0564

Paganico is a village in the province of Grosseto, in southern Tuscany, central Italy. It is a frazione of the comune of Civitella Paganico. It is situated in the valley of the Ombrone river, at 66 meters above sea level. In 2011 it had a population of 961 inhabitants.

== History ==
The town was founded in the 13th century by the Republic of Siena, in a strategic location overlooking the valley towards the Sienese core lands.

== Cultural heritage ==
Sites of interest include the Church of St Michael Archangel, built in the 13th-14th centuries. The church houses a 15th-century crucifix and Renaissance paintings, including a series of 14th-century frescoes (1368) that depict the Stories of St. Michael, attributed to the Sienese painter Biagio di Goro Ghezzi and his workshop. Paganico has preserved its medieval walls, with several towers and gates.

== Transports ==
- Civitella Paganico railway station

== See also ==
- Casale di Pari
- Civitella Marittima
- Dogana, Civitella Paganico
- Monte Antico
- Pari, Civitella Paganico
