= Casale di Pari =

Casale di Pari Casal di Pari
- Frazione
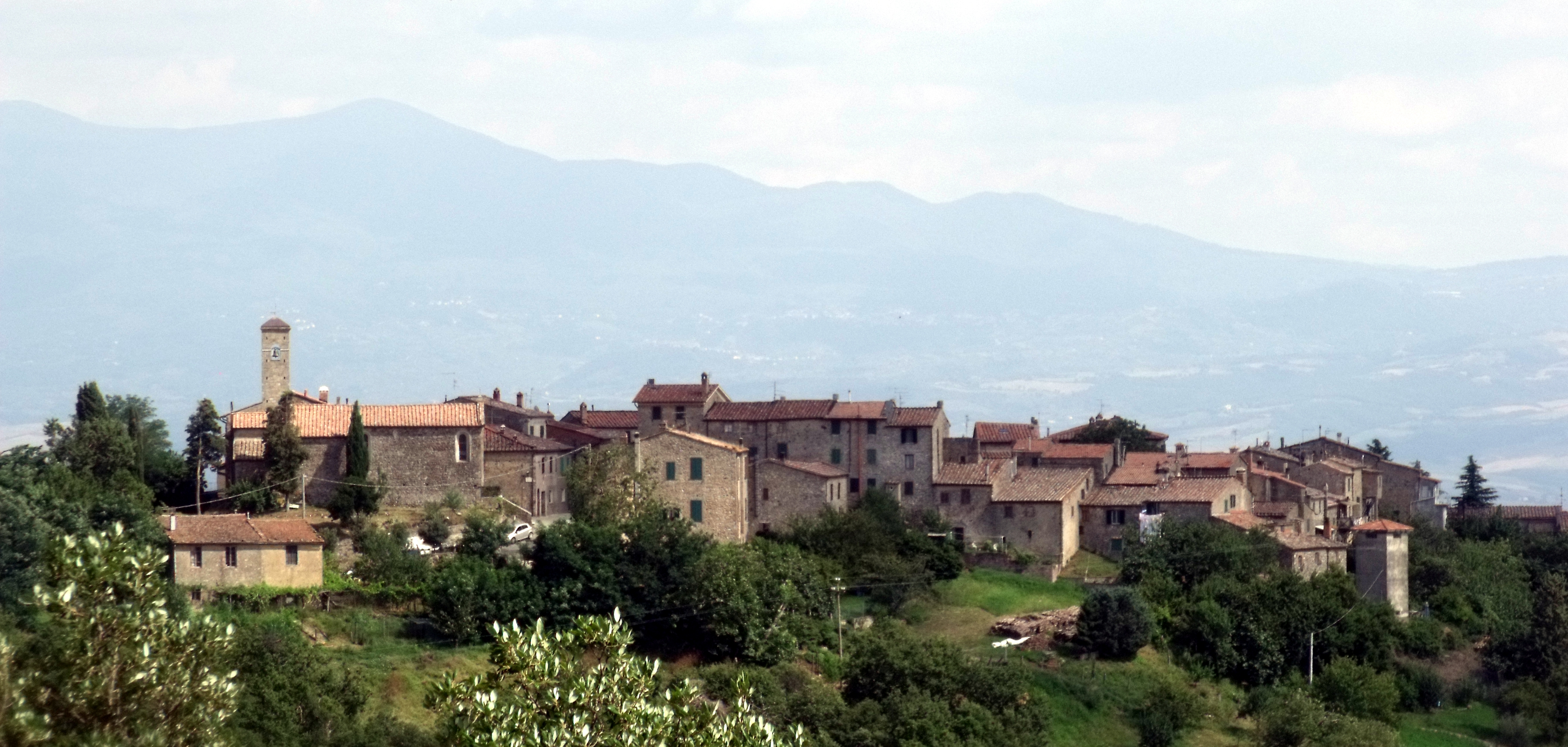
- View of Casale di Pari

- Location of Casale di Pari in Italy
- Coordinates: 43°03′13″N 11°17′27″E
- Country: Italy
- Region: Tuscany
- Province: Grosseto (GR)
- Comune: Civitella Paganico
- Elevation: 481 m (1,578 ft)

Population (2011)
  - Total: 184
- Demonym: Casalini
- Time zone: UTC+1 (CET)
  - Summer (DST): UTC+2 (CEST)
- Postal code: 58048
- Dialing code: (+39) 0564

Casale di Pari is a village in Tuscany, central Italy, administratively a frazione of the comune of Civitella Paganico, province of Grosseto, in the area of the Ombrone Valley. At the time of the 2001 census its population amounted to 176.

Italian comics artist Aurelio Galleppini was born in Casale di Pari.

== Geography ==
Casale di Pari is about 41 km from Grosseto and 10 km from Civitella Marittima, and it is situated on the slopes of the hill of Pari, near the Ombrone and Farma rivers.

== Main sights ==
- San Donato (15th century), main parish church of the village, it was restructured in the 18th century.
- Episcopal Palace, a building built in 1573.
- Well of Casale di Pari, ancient well situated in the main square of the village.

== Notable people ==
- Giuseppe Domenico Felli (1839–1897), sculptor
- Aurelio Galleppini (1917–1994), comics artist, known for Tex

== Bibliography ==
- Aldo Mazzolai, Guida della Maremma. Percorsi tra arte e natura, Le Lettere, Florence, 1997.

== See also ==
- Civitella Marittima
- Dogana, Civitella Paganico
- Monte Antico
- Paganico
- Pari, Civitella Paganico
