= Fagnani =

Fagnani is a noble Italian surname derived from various places called Fagnano. Notable people with the surname include:

- Antonietta Fagnani Arese (1778–1847), Italian noblewoman and woman of letters
- Francesca Fagnani (born 1976) is an Italian journalist, writer and television presenter
- Maria Seymour-Conway (née Fagnani; 1771–1856), British noblewoman
- Nina Fagnani (1856–1928), American painter of portrait miniatures
- Prospero Fagnani (1588–1678), Italian canon lawyer
