= Civitella Paganico =

- Comune
- Comune di Civitella Paganico
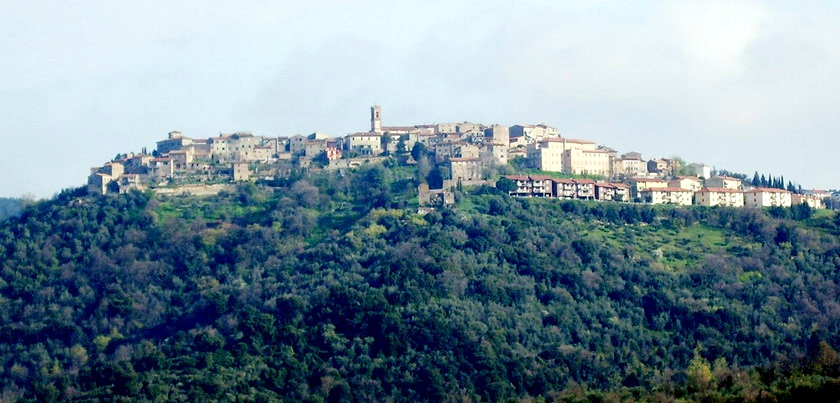
- View of Civitella Marittima

- Coat of arms

- Location within Italy Location within Tuscany
- Coordinates: 42°59′42″N 11°16′54″E
- Country: Italy
- Region: Tuscany
- Province: Grosseto (GR)
- Frazioni: Casale di Pari, Civitella Marittima, Dogana, Monte Antico, Paganico, Pari

Government
  - Mayor: Alessandra Biondi

Area
  - Total: 192.9 km^{2} (74.5 sq mi)
- Elevation: 329 m (1,079 ft)

Population (30 June 2017)
  - Total: 3,213
  - Density: 16.66/km^{2} (43.14/sq mi)
- Demonym: Civitellini
- Time zone: UTC+1 (CET)
  - Summer (DST): UTC+2 (CEST)
- Postal code: 58045
- Dialing code: 0564
- Patron saint: St. Fabian
- Saint day: 20 January
- Website: Official website

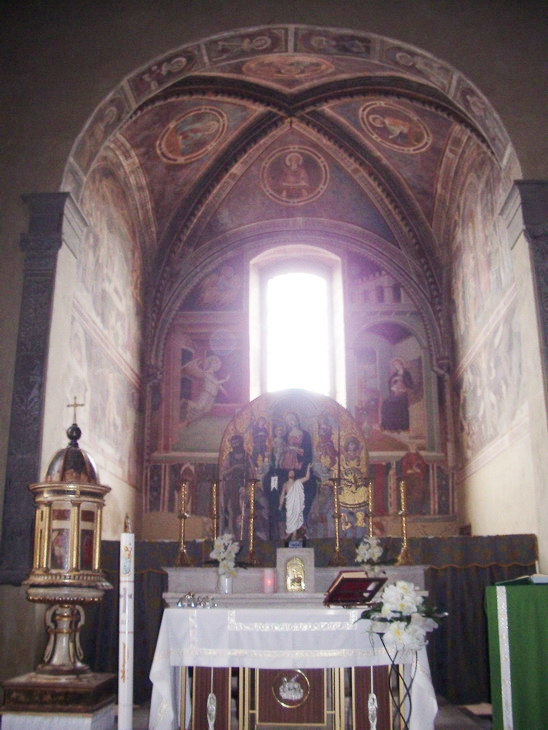
Frescoes in the church of San Michele in Paganico

Civitella Paganico is a comune (municipality) in the Province of Grosseto in the Italian region Tuscany. It features agricultural land, the main economy of the region, interspersed with dense forest. It is home to a variety of plant and animal species. Civitella Paganico is home to the Petriolo hot springs, which have been enjoyed by travelers for thousands of years.

Civilization in Civitella Paganico likely dates back to the Palaeolithic age. It is home to Etruscan and Roman remains. During the Middle Ages, the land was controlled by the Ardengheschi family, the Republic of Siena, and the Grand Duchy of Tuscany. As of 2013, it is home to 3291 people, of which 15% are foreigners.

Civitella Paganico contains a number of small villages, the largest of which is Paganico. The municipal seat is located in Civitella Marittima. Civitella Paganico is also home to an Etruscan tomb that was found undisturbed in 2007. The remains of 30 people were found in the small enclosure.

== History ==
Evidence of civilization in Civitella Paganico dates back to the Palaeolithic age. The village of Pari retains evidence of Etruscan and Roman habitation. During the 12th century, Civitella Paganico was owned by the Ardengheschi family. Beginning in 1254, the family began to reduce their holdings as the land came under the control of the Republic of Siena, selling the last of it to Sienese families in 1371. Following the fall of the Republic in 1555, much of the land was annexed by the Grand Duchy of Tuscany.

=== Petriolo hot springs ===
The Petriolo hot springs were known in ancient times and were possibly frequented by the Etruscans and Romans. Written mention of it dates back to 1130. As the site gained famed for alleged curative properties during the Middle Ages, numerous famous people came to visit. Pope Pius II frequented the site, seeking a cure for his gout. A number of Papal Bulls were issued from the Civitella Paganico as a result. The Republic of Siena built cabins on the site and instituted a tax on bathers. Originally, there were four baths on the site, one of which remains today. A resort hotel is currently under construction.

=== Archaeology ===
In 2007, an archaeology student named Andrea Marcocci unearthed an undisturbed Etruscan tomb in Civitella Paganico, near the castle of Casenovole. The site, nicknamed the "Tomb of the Badger" because of a badger den at the tomb's entrance, dates to between third and second century BC, a time when the Etruscan civilization was in the process of being conquered by the Romans. Marcocci first found the opening in 1991, but kept it a secret for 16 years, thinking it would be robbed. When logging nearby threatened to uncover the site, Marcocci, who grew up in the area, decided it was time to investigate the site. He teamed up with other students and amateur archeologists to excavate the site.

The excavation team found a narrow corridor that led to a 2 metres (6.6 ft) long, 1.79 metres (5.9 ft) wide burial chamber filled with dirt. When the dirt was excavated, Marcocci and his colleagues found 80 artifacts, including vases (urns), mirrors of ceramic and bronze, coins, and rings. Of the urns, 25 were terracotta, 3 stone, and 2 bronze. The ashes of 30 people were discovered, an unusually high number for a single Etruscan tomb. Marcocci hypothesized the urns belonged to a single family, with the smaller urns belonging to their servants.

== Geography ==
Civitella Paganico is located in the Province of Grosseto. It is bordered on the north and east by the Province of Siena, on the south by the comunes of Campagnatico and Cinigiano, and on the west by Roccastrada comune. The territory is within the valley of the Ombrone river. The municipal seat is located in the frazione of Civitella Marittima.

Civitella Paganico covers 19,271 hectares (74.41 sq mi). The hilly landscape is marked by areas of dense forest interspersed with cultivated farm land. The forests host a wide variety of plant life including juniper, oak, and cypress trees. Animal life includes deer, hare, pheasant, and wild boar. Elevation in the comune ranges from 44 to 596 metres (144 to 1,955 ft) above sea level. On the northern edge of Civitella Paganico lie the Petriolo hot springs.

=== Subdivision ===
As of 2013, Civitella Paganico is home to 3291 people. It contains a number of frazioni (towns and villages). Casale di Pari is the highest point of the comune. Casenovole was once an important court of the Counts of Ardengheschi. Civitella Marittima, a hilltop town of 350, dates to the Etruscan period. Dogana is a small village in the countryside. Monte Antico is home to a famous castle. Paganico, the most populous town of the comune, was built by the Republic of Siena. It is home to the church of San Michele Arcangelo, which houses several frescoes painted by Biagio di Goro Ghezzi, and the only intermediate school of the comune. Pari is located near the Petriolo hot springs and was the favorite home of 19th-century writer Federigo Tozzi.

== Economy ==
The economy of Civitella Paganico is largely dependent on agriculture.

== Government ==
=== List of mayors ===
Mayor	Term start	Term end	Party
Fosco Monaci	1985	1990	Italian Socialist Party
Loris Petri	1990	2004	Christian Democracy/Italian People's Party
Paolo Fratini	2004	2014	Independent (centre-left)
Alessandra Biondi	2014	Incumbent	Independent (centre-left)

== Culture ==
The population is 12.7% children under 15, 26.6% people aged 65 or older, and 60.7% people aged 15–64. 50.1% of the population is married. 15.3% of residents are foreigners, with natives of Romania making up the largest portion, followed by Morocco, and Macedonia.

The patron saints of Civitella Paganico are Saint Fabian and Saint Sebastian.

== Transports ==
- Civitella Paganico railway station
