= Villa Fagnano =

Coordinates: 43°22′29″N 11°20′28″E

The Villa Fagnano is a baroque-style rural palace structure located near Vagliagli, a hamlet of Castelnuovo Berardenga, a few miles outside Siena, in the region of Tuscany, Italy.

The house was erected in 1698 by the Signor Bandini Piccolomini on at the site of a former fortress house, using the designs of Giovanni Battista Piccolomini. An inventory from 1840 noted that the villa was decorated with paintings by Francesco Simonini, and that the chapel had an altarpiece by Casolani, possibly Alessandro.

The villa retains a walled Giardino all'italiana with ordered geometric blocks of flowerbeds, framed by box hedges and punctuated with lemon trees in vases. In the center is a circular fountain with a modern statue of Neptune and an allegory of the four seasons, both by the sculptor Romanelli. In the garden is a nymphaeum with a fishpond and three niches adorned with statues.
