= Monte Antico =

Monte Antico Monte Antico Alto / Scalo
- Frazione
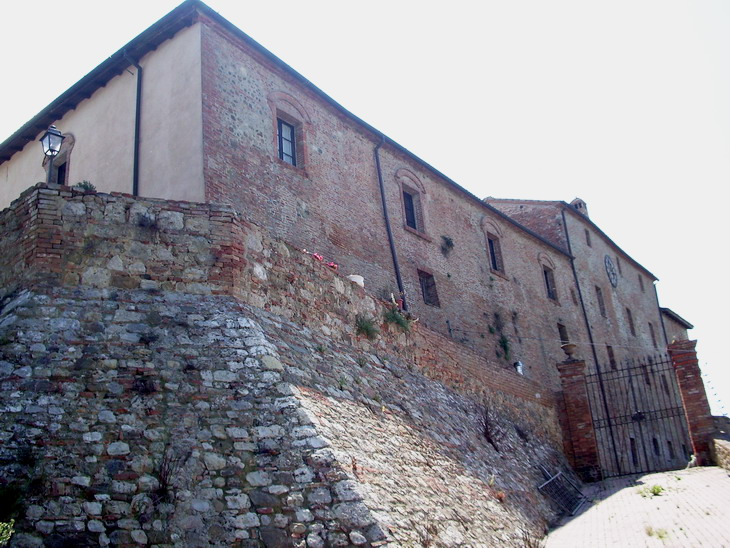
- The castle of Monte Antico

- Location of Monte Antico in Italy
- Coordinates: 42°58′58″N 11°21′49″E
- Country: Italy
- Region: Tuscany
- Province: Grosseto (GR)
- Comune: Civitella Paganico
- Elevation: 77 m (253 ft)

Population (2011)
  - Total: 22
- Demonym: Montanticai
- Time zone: UTC+1 (CET)
  - Summer (DST): UTC+2 (CEST)
- Postal code: 58048
- Dialing code: (+39) 0564

Monte Antico is a village in Tuscany, central Italy, administratively a frazione of the comune of Civitella Paganico, province of Grosseto, in the area of the Ombrone Valley. At the time of the 2001 census its population amounted to 33.

== Geography ==
Monte Antico is about 35 km from Grosseto and 18 km from Civitella Marittima, and it is situated where river Ombrone and river Orcia meet.

It is composed by two hamlets, Monte Antico Alto, where it is situated the ancient castle, and Monte Antico Scalo, the modern neighbourhood near to the train station.

== History ==
Monte Antico originated as a settlement before the year 1000, occupying a dominant position over the Ombrone valley as a possession of the Ardengheschi family, who built an early castle. During the 14th century the site passed to the Buonsignori and subsequently to the Salimbeni family, before coming under the control of the Tolomei in the late 15th century.

Following the opening of the Siena–Grosseto railway line in 1872, a railway station was established at the foot of the castle.

After World War II, in connection with the land reform launched in Maremma in 1951, the area near the railway station was selected for the construction of a modern service village. Designed by architect Antonio Provenzano between 1954 and 1958, the village included a central courtyard square, a church, and a social building.

== Main sights ==
=== Castle ===
The Monte Antico Castle forms the historic core of the village, originating as a settlement of the Ardengheschi family, and is situated on an elevated position above the modern centre. The former church of Saint Thomas the Apostle, deconsecrated and re-built in the 20th century in Romanesque Revival, is also located next to the castle.

=== Church of Saint Thomas the Apostle ===
The church of Saint Thomas the Apostle (San Tommaso Apostolo) is the main place of worship of the village and is located in the modern centre near the railway station. It preserves the dedication of the former medieval church of the castle. The church was built by the Ente Maremma as part of the foundation of the new service centre, to a design by architect Provenzano, and was completed in 1961. From 10 November 1986 to 31 August 2013, it served as the parish church. The building has a single nave and a rectangular plan and is preceded by a large forecourt with an octagonal fountain at its centre. The gabled façade features a central rose window and a portico supported by square pillars. The apse is rectangular in plan and covered by a barrel vault; the exterior is finished in plaster, with stone cladding on the lower sections.

== Transport ==
The village is served by its own station on the Grosseto-Siena railway. From 1872 to 1927 it functioned as an intermediate station on the original route via Asciano, and from 1927 it has served as a junction between this line and the shorter route via Buonconvento.

== See also ==
- Casale di Pari
- Civitella Marittima
- Dogana, Civitella Paganico
- Paganico
- Pari, Civitella Paganico
