= Giuseppe Domenico Felli =

Italian sculptor (1839–1897)

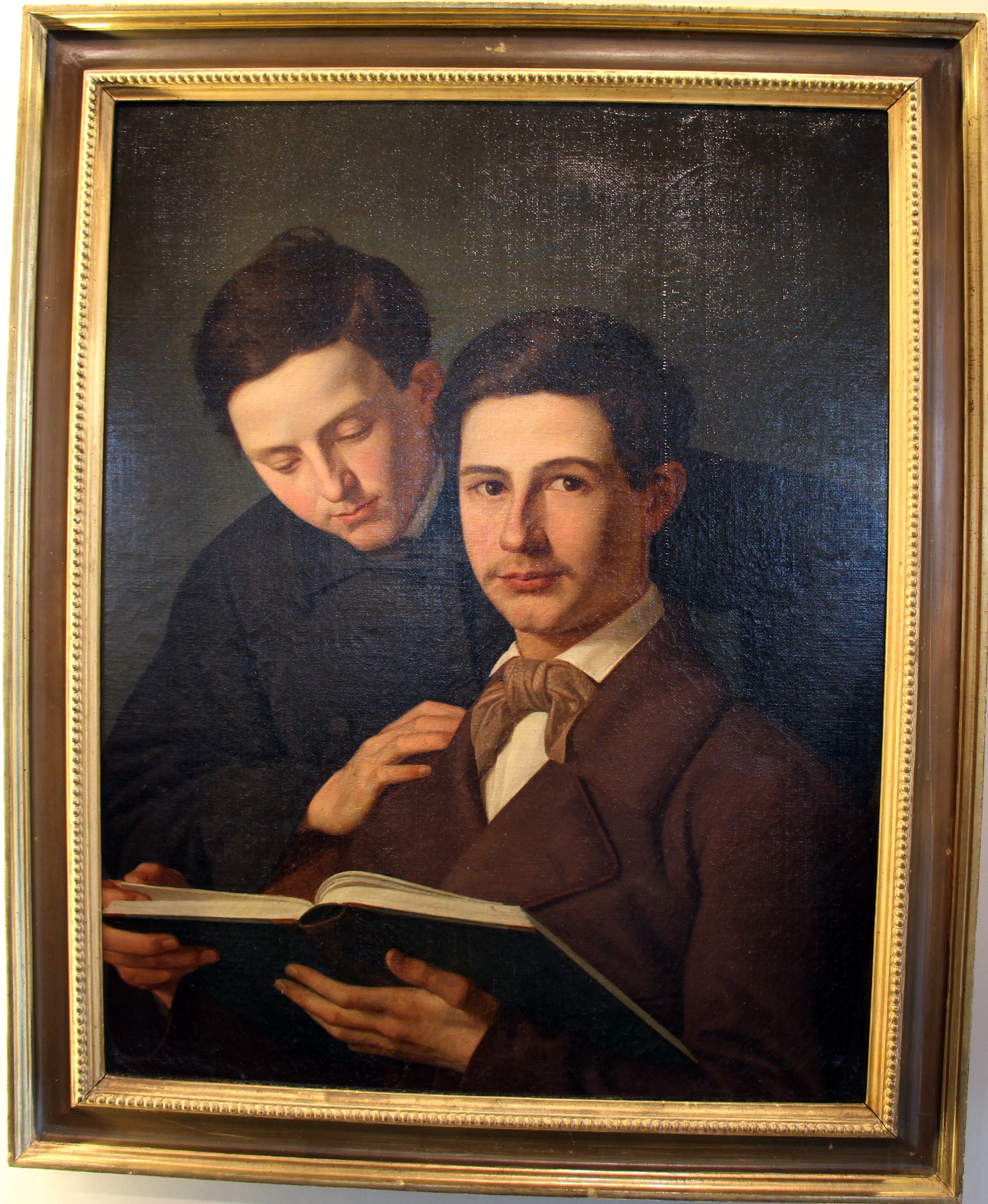
- Felli (left) portrayed alongside Alessandro Franchi by Giovanni Bruni (1855)
- Born: 19 March 1839; Casale di Pari, Grand Duchy of Tuscany
- Died: 5 December 1897 (aged 58); Florence, Kingdom of Italy
- Occupation: Sculptor

Giuseppe Domenico Felli (19 March 1839 – 5 December 1897) was an Italian sculptor, active mainly in his native Tuscany.

== Life and career ==
Born in Casale di Pari in 1839, Felli was enrolled at the Institute of Fine Arts in Siena, where he studied under teachers such as Enea Becheroni, Luigi Mussini, Salvatore Gabrielli, Lorenzo Doveri, and Giovanni Bruni. After working as an assistant in Tito Sarrocchi's studio, he volunteered in the Second Italian War of Independence and later moved to Florence, attending the Academy of Fine Arts and becoming a pupil of Giovanni Dupré.

Felli distinguished himself as a funerary sculptor, creating monuments and medallions, including the Genio della Morte in the cemetery of Misericordia in Siena. He also participated in various competitions for designing the façade of Florence Cathedral, becoming part of the artistic debate and competing multiple times without being selected. Additionally, he worked on decoration and sculpture projects for churches and cemeteries, such as for the church of the Propositura in Castel del Piano and the cemetery of Misericordia in Grosseto.

After a brief stay in Rome, he settled in Florence, where he worked as a sculptor, painter, and ceramist, participating in exhibitions and contests. From 1874, he was a modeller at the National Museum of Anthropology in Florence, directed by Paolo Mantegazza, a position he held until his death. In this role, he contributed to the restoration of artifacts and the creation of mannequins and busts of indigenous populations. He was a member of the Society for the Promotion of Arts in Florence and participated in the founding of the Applied Arts School for Industry in Pesaro, although he later found the method too technical for his preferences.

Felli died in December 1897 in Florence. He was buried in the Romito cemetery.

== Sources ==
- Enrico Crispolti; Anna Mazzanti; Luca Quattrocchi, eds. (2006). Arte in Maremma nella prima metà del Novecento. Milan: Silvana Editoriale.
- Tamara Gigli Sanesi; Giorgio Bonfiglioli (2019). Giuseppe Domenico Felli scultore. Grosseto: Innocenti.
- Carlo Sisi; Ettore Spalletti (1994). La cultura artistica a Siena nell'Ottocento. Siena: Monte dei Paschi.
