= Pari, Tuscany =

Pari
- Frazione
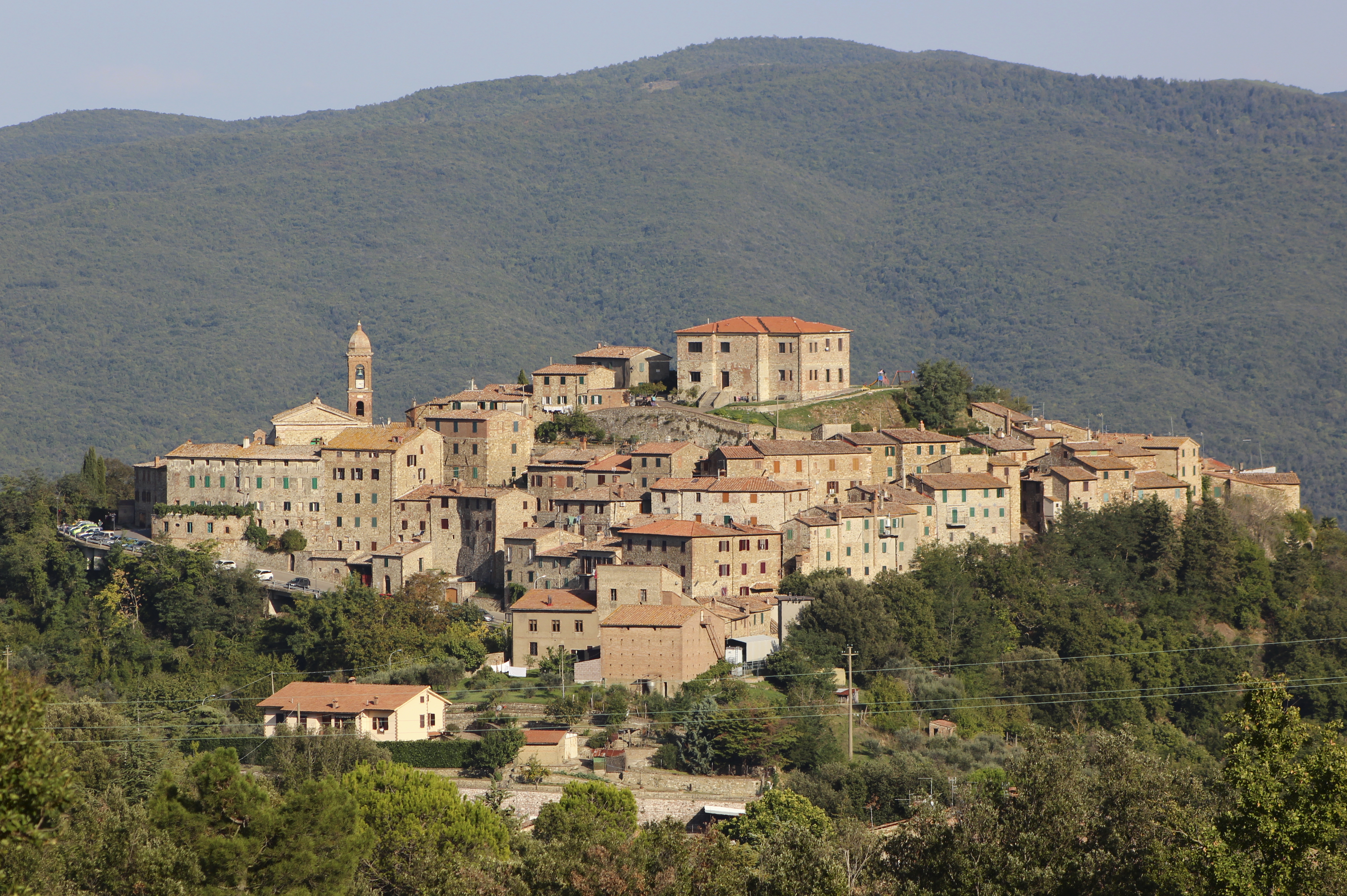
- View of Pari

- Location of Pari in Italy
- Coordinates: 43°03′48″N 11°19′11″E
- Country: Italy
- Region: Tuscany
- Province: Grosseto (GR)
- Comune: Civitella Paganico
- Elevation: 377 m (1,237 ft)

Population (2011)
  - Total: 177
- Demonym: Parigiani
- Time zone: UTC+1 (CET)
  - Summer (DST): UTC+2 (CEST)
- Postal code: 58040
- Dialing code: (+39) 0564

Pari is a village in Tuscany, central Italy, administratively a frazione of the comune of Civitella Paganico, province of Grosseto, in the area of the Ombrone Valley. At the time of the 2001 census its population amounted to 204.

Pari is about 44 km from Grosseto and 13 km from Civitella Marittima, and it is situated on a hill near the Ombrone and Farma rivers.

== Main sights ==
- San Biagio, main parish church of the village, it was restructured in 1460 and lately in the 19th century
- Oratory of Santa Croce, old church of the 16th century
- Palazzo di Giustizia, former court and prison of the village
- Ancient wells of Pari
  - Well of Piazza Castelfidardo
  - Well of Piazza della Chiesa
- Walls of Pari, old fortifications which surround the village since the 12th century
- Pari Center for New Learning, a non-profit educational center directed by physicist F. David Peat, who co-authored the book Science, Order, and Creativity with theoretical physicist David Bohm. The center has hosted, with the support of its renowned fellows from academia and the arts, the academy Accademia dei Pari. It hosts international conferences on the role of trust and ethics in the world of economics and business, and conferences on the relationship between religion and science.

== Bibliography ==
- Aldo Mazzolai, Guida della Maremma. Percorsi tra arte e natura, Le Lettere, Florence, 1997.

== See also ==
- Casale di Pari
- Civitella Marittima
- Dogana, Civitella Paganico
- Monte Antico
- Paganico
