= Dogana, Civitella Paganico =

Dogana
- Frazione
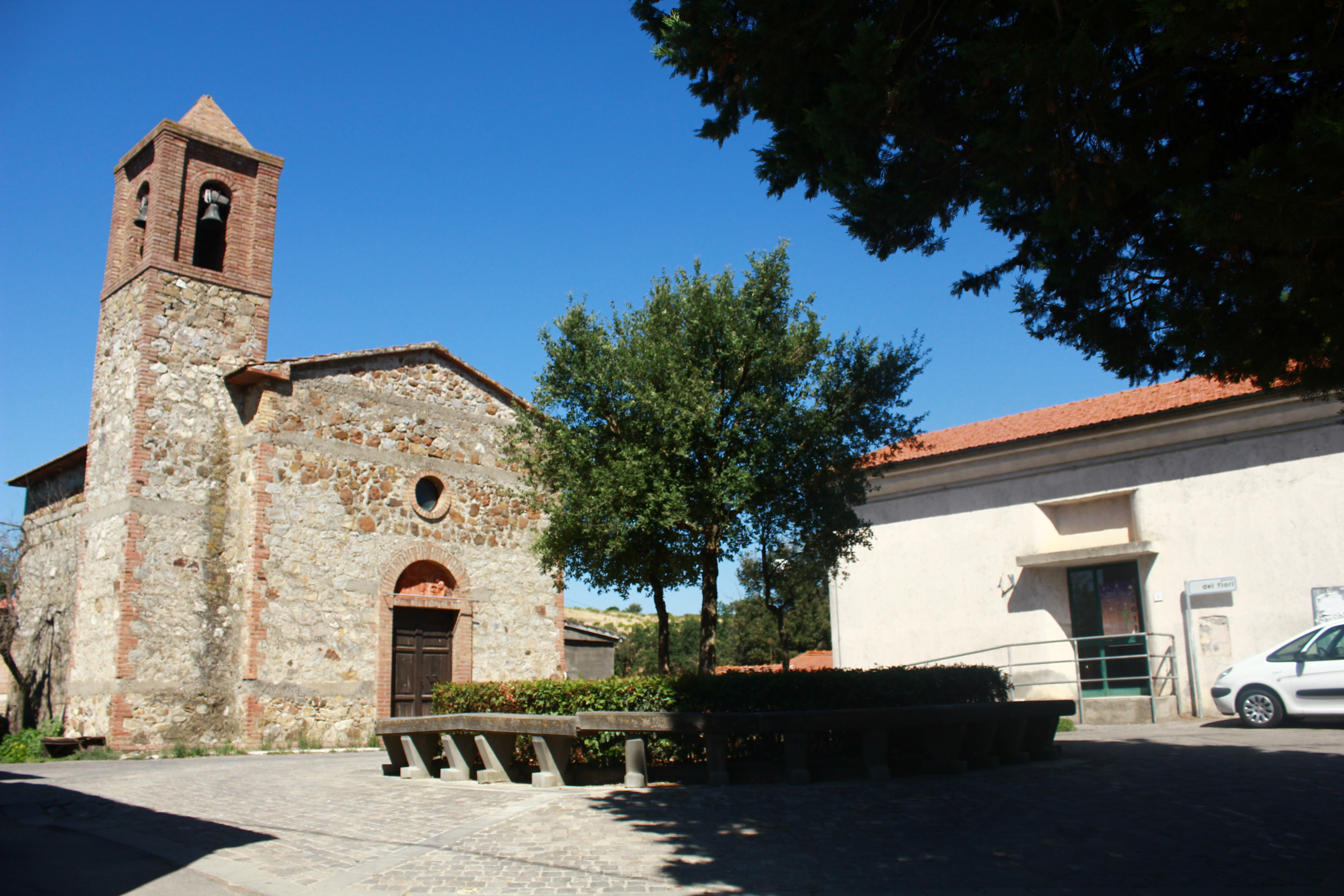
- The church of Maria Bambina in Dogana

- Location of Dogana in Italy
- Coordinates: 42°58′22″N 11°19′4″E
- Country: Italy
- Region: Tuscany
- Province: Grosseto (GR)
- Comune: Civitella Paganico
- Elevation: 206 m (676 ft)

Population (2011)
  - Total: 25
- Time zone: UTC+1 (CET)
  - Summer (DST): UTC+2 (CEST)
- Postal code: 58048
- Dialing code: (+39) 0564

Dogana is a village in Tuscany, central Italy, administratively a frazione of the comune of Civitella Paganico, province of Grosseto. At the time of the 2001 census its population amounted to 38.

Dogana is about 32 km from Grosseto and 7 km from Paganico, and it is situated on a hill between the Ombrone and Lanzo rivers. It was the ancient dogana (customs) during the Republic of Siena.

== Main sights ==
- Maria Bambina, main parish church of the village, it was built in 1955.
- Arc of Borgo, small and picturesque loggia, it is the access to the square of the village.
- Citernone farmhouse, it is attested in a document of 1717.

== Bibliography ==
- Lidia Calzolai, Paolo Marcaccini, I percorsi della transumanza in Toscana, Edizioni Polistampa, Florence, 2003.

== See also ==
- Casale di Pari
- Civitella Marittima
- Monte Antico
- Paganico
- Pari, Civitella Paganico
