= Quercegrossa =

- Frazione
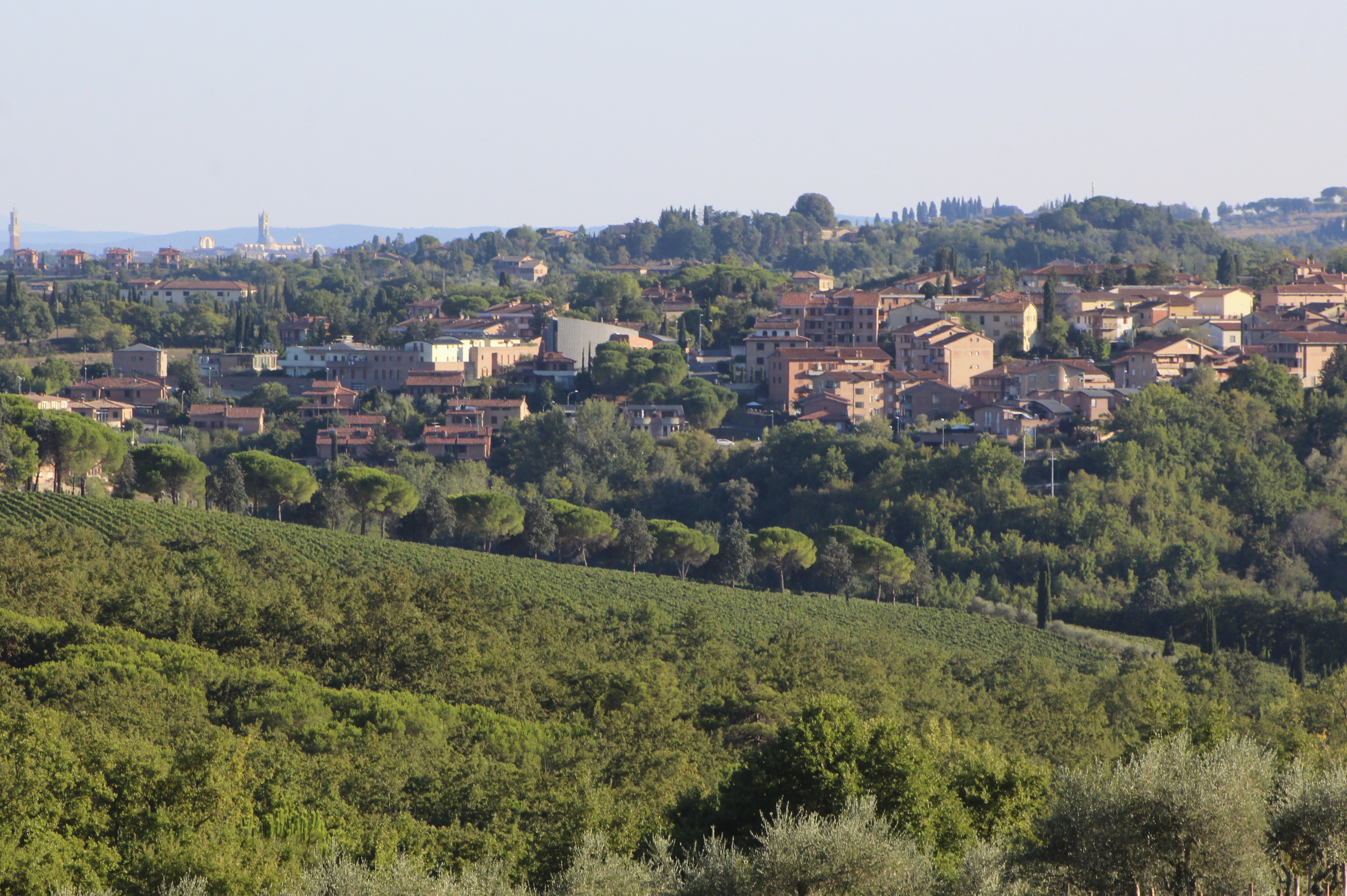
- View of Quercegrossa

- Location of Quercegrossa in Italy
- Coordinates: 43°23′38″N 11°18′28″E
- Country: Italy
- Region: Tuscany
- Province: Siena (SI)
- Comune: Castelnuovo Berardenga; Monteriggioni
- Elevation: 342 m (1,122 ft)

Population (2011)
  - Total: 1,482
- Time zone: UTC+1 (CET)
  - Summer (DST): UTC+2 (CEST)

Quercegrossa is a village in Tuscany, central Italy, administratively a frazione of the comuni of Castelnuovo Berardenga and Monteriggioni, province of Siena. Quercegrossa is about 12 km from Siena.

It is the birthplace of artist Jacopo della Quercia.

== Main sights ==
- Santi Giacomo e Niccolò, main parish church of the village
