= Casetta =

- Frazione
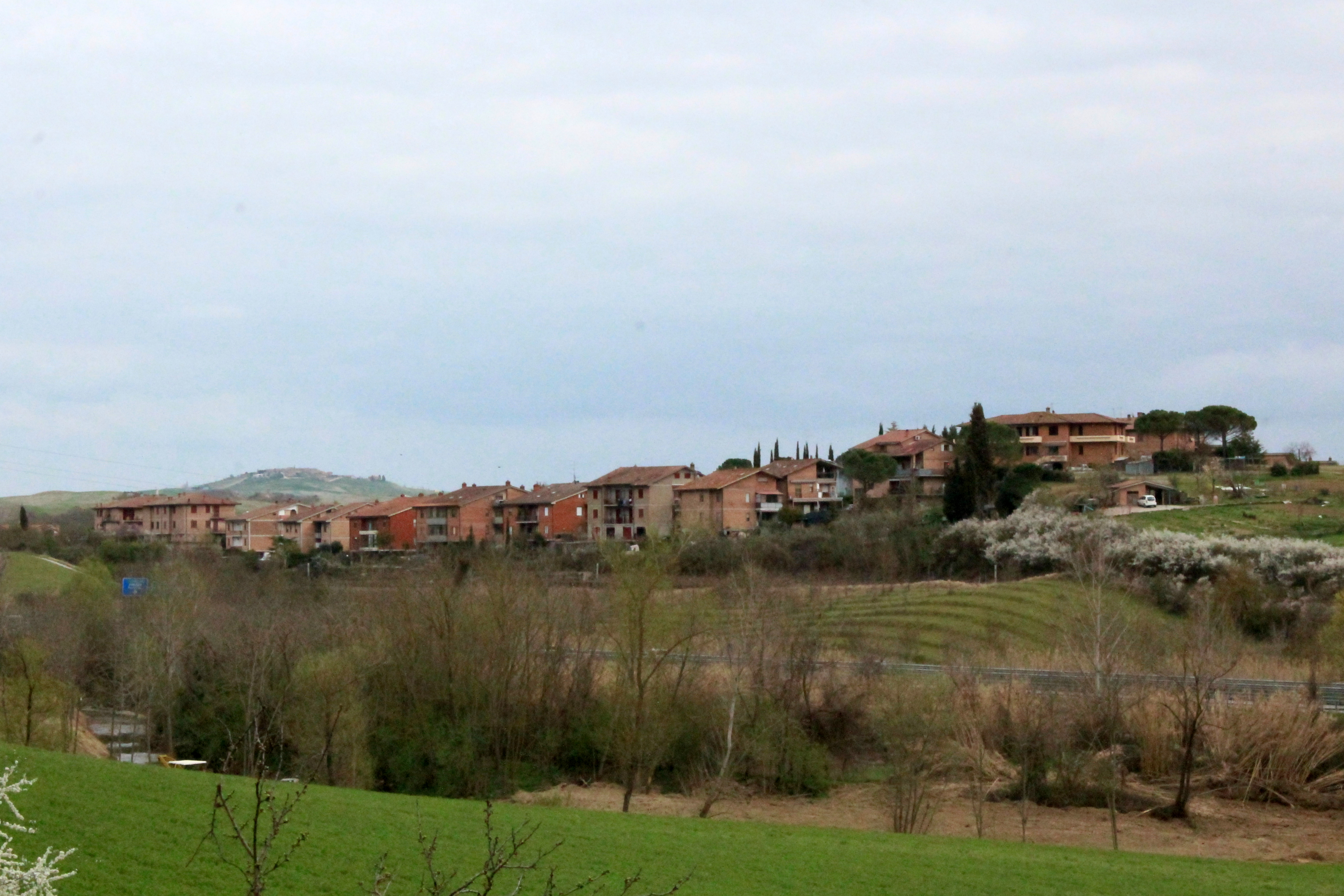
- View of Casetta

- Location of Casetta in Italy
- Coordinates: 43°18′13″N 11°25′32″E
- Country: Italy
- Region: Tuscany
- Province: Siena (SI)
- Comune: Castelnuovo Berardenga
- Elevation: 207 m (679 ft)

Population (2011)
  - Total: 489
- Time zone: UTC+1 (CET)
  - Summer (DST): UTC+2 (CEST)

Casetta is a village in Tuscany, central Italy, administratively a frazione of the comune of Castelnuovo Berardenga, province of Siena. At the time of the 2001 census its population was 396.

Casetta is about 10 km from Siena and 11 km from Castelnuovo Berardenga.
