= Pianella, Castelnuovo Berardenga =

Pianella
- Frazione
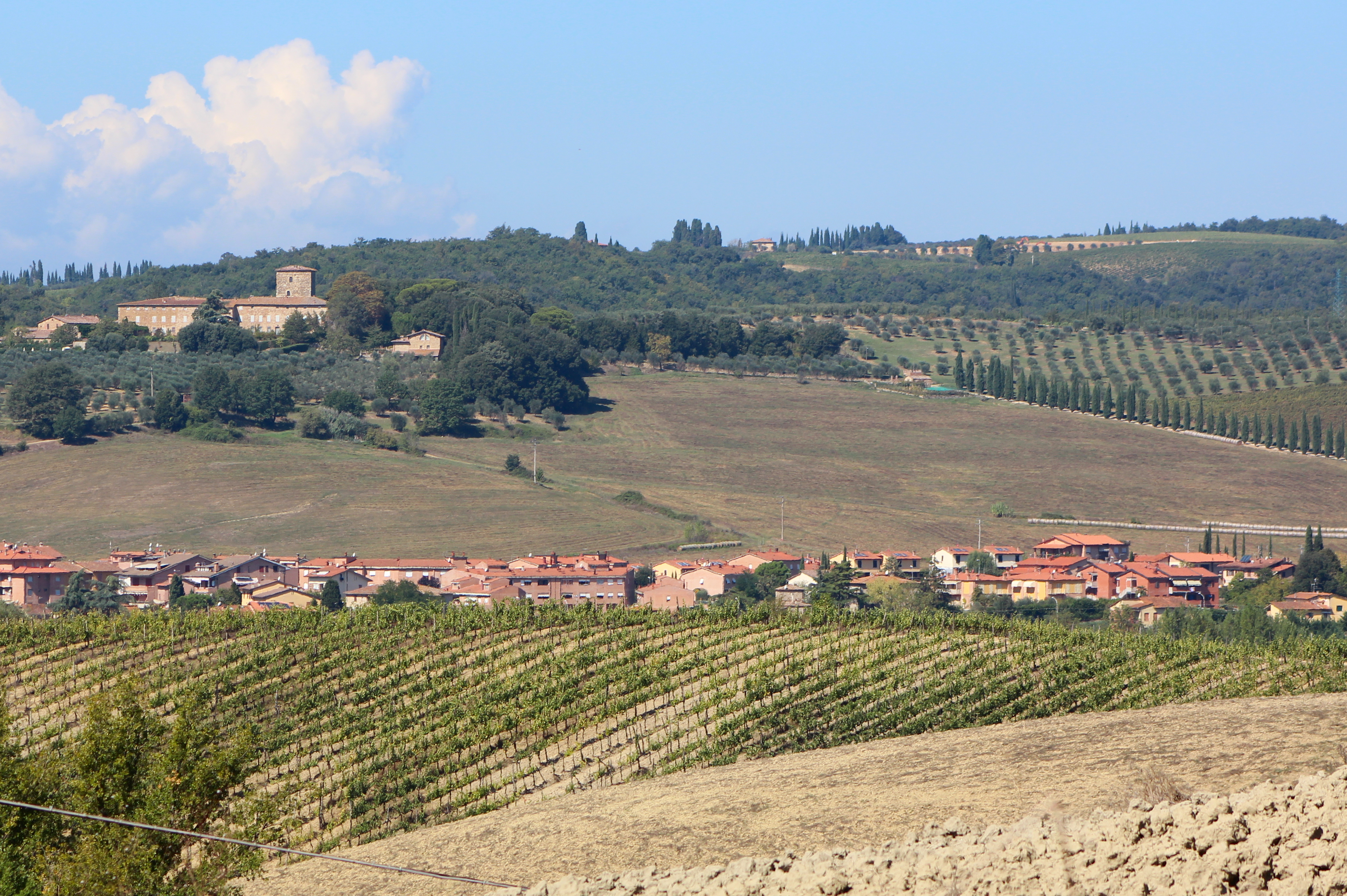
- View of Pianella

- Location of Pianella in Italy
- Coordinates: 43°21′13″N 11°24′58″E
- Country: Italy
- Region: Tuscany
- Province: Siena (SI)
- Comune: Castelnuovo Berardenga
- Elevation: 226 m (741 ft)

Population (2011)
  - Total: 567
- Time zone: UTC+1 (CET)
  - Summer (DST): UTC+2 (CEST)

Pianella is a village in Tuscany, central Italy, administratively a frazione of the comune of Castelnuovo Berardenga, province of Siena. At the time of the 2001 census its population was 468.

Pianella is about 13 km from Siena and 12 km from Castelnuovo Berardenga.
