= Civitella Paganico railway station =

Railway station in Italy

Civitella Paganico
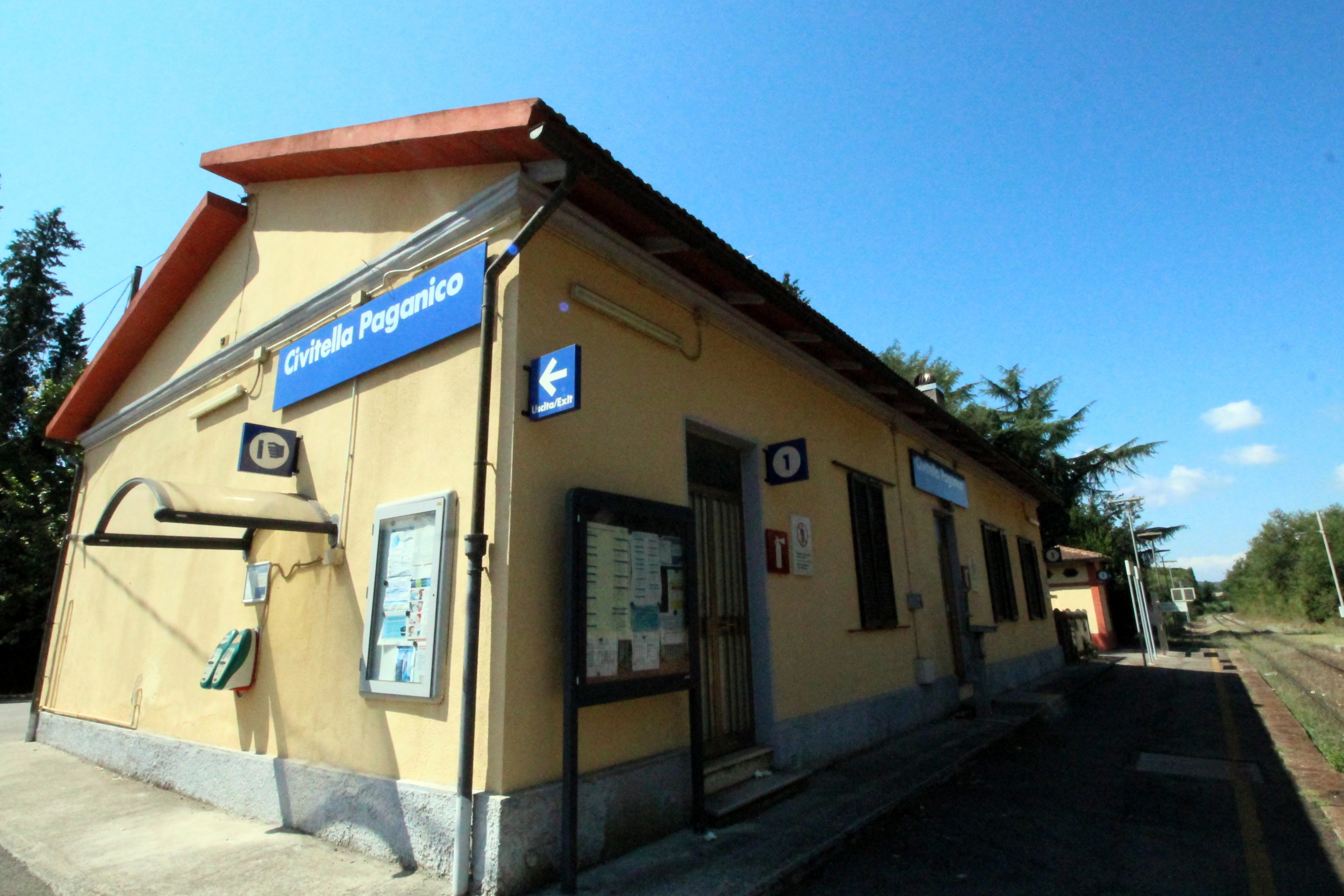

General information
- Location: Via della Stazione, Paganico 58045; Civitella Paganico, Grosseto, Tuscany; Italy
- Coordinates: 42°56′24.32″N 11°16′59.7″E
- Operator: Rete Ferroviaria Italiana; Trenitalia
- Line: Siena–Grosseto
- Tracks: 1

Other information
- Classification: Bronze

History
- Opened: 1872; 154 years ago
Location
- Location within Tuscany Location within Italy

Civitella Paganico railway station is an Italian railway station on the Siena–Grosseto railway line, located in Paganico, in the municipality of Civitella Paganico, Province of Grosseto, Tuscany.

== History ==
The station opened in 1872 following the inauguration of the Siena–Grosseto railway line. It was originally named "Paganico", but the name was changed to "Paganico Grossetano" on 12 April 1909. In 1928, it was renamed "Civitella Paganico".

== Train services and movements ==
Regular passenger services to the station consist of regionale and regionale veloce services, which run to Grosseto, Siena, and Florence SMN.

== See also ==
- History of rail transport in Italy
- List of railway stations in Tuscany
- Rail transport in Italy
- Railway stations in Italy
