= Pievasciata =

- Frazione
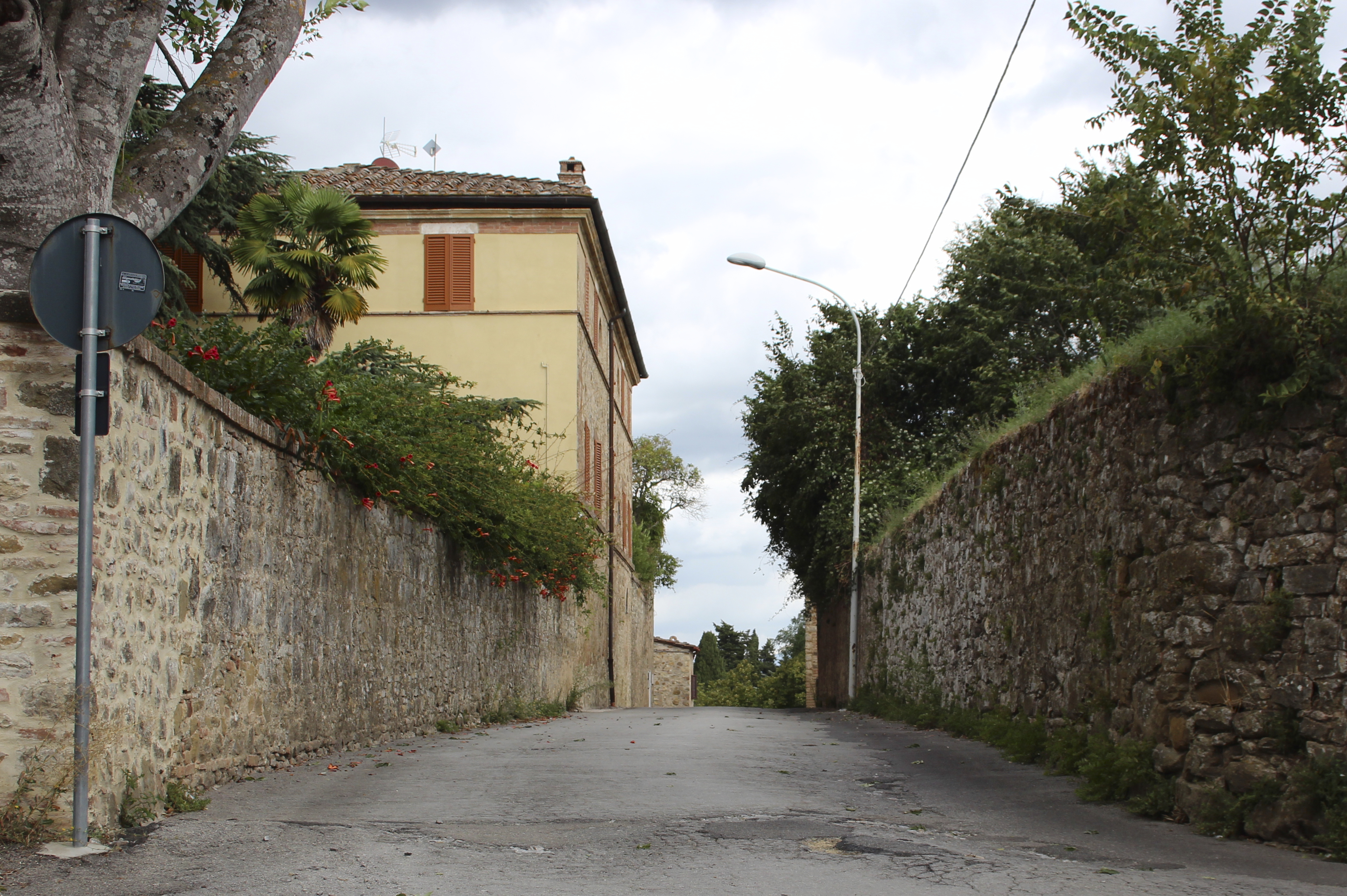

- Location of Pievasciata in Italy
- Coordinates: 43°23′21″N 11°23′7″E
- Country: Italy
- Region: Tuscany
- Province: Siena (SI)
- Comune: Castelnuovo Berardenga
- Elevation: 430 m (1,410 ft)

Population (2011)
  - Total: 134
- Time zone: UTC+1 (CET)
  - Summer (DST): UTC+2 (CEST)

Pievasciata is a village in Tuscany, central Italy, administratively a frazione of the comune of Castelnuovo Berardenga, province of Siena. At the time of the 2001 census its population was 52.

Pievasciata is about 13 km from Siena and 19 km from Castelnuovo Berardenga.
