= San Giovanni a Cerreto =

- Frazione
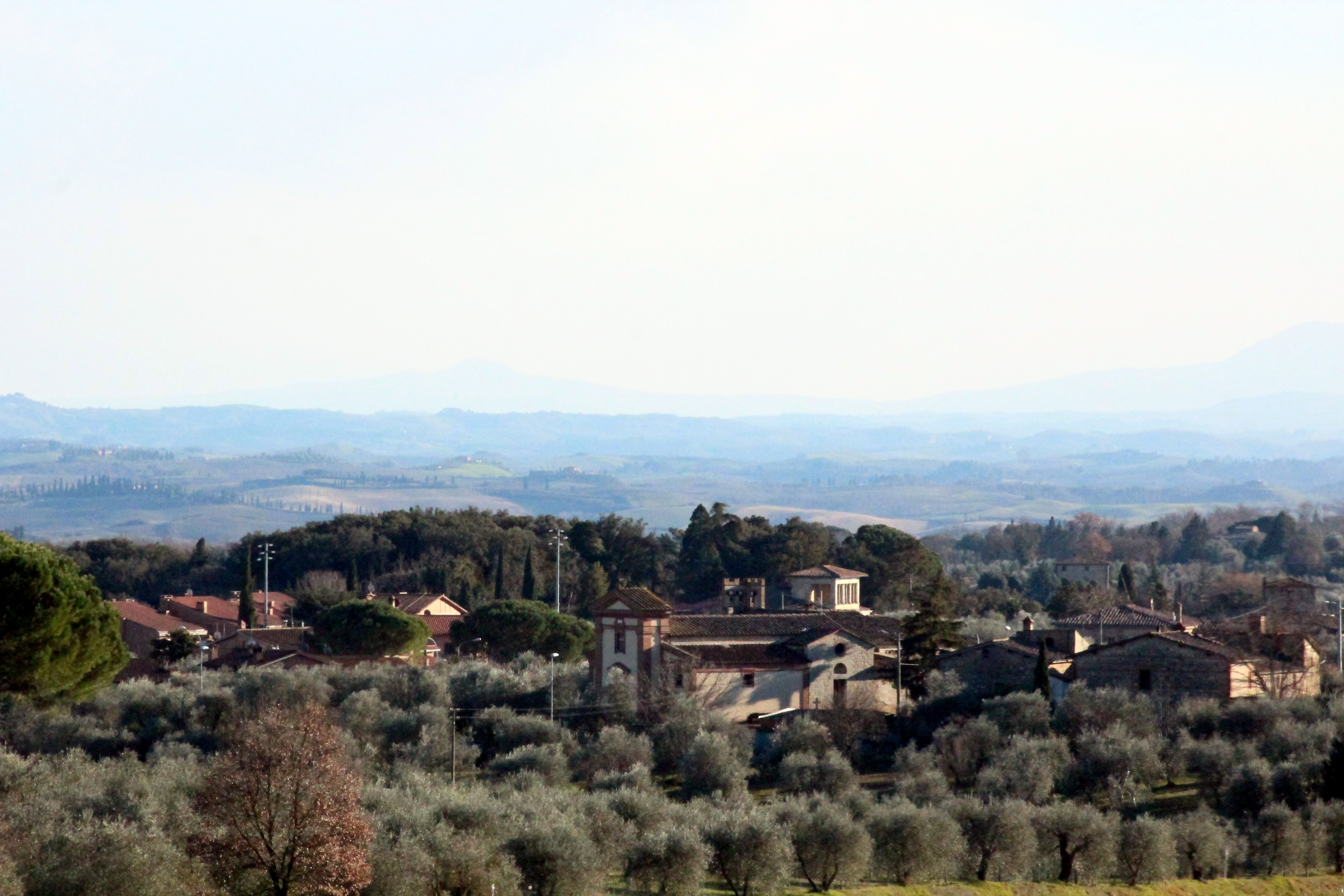
- View of San Giovanni a Cerreto

- Location of San Giovanni a Cerreto in Italy
- Coordinates: 43°20′50″N 11°23′58″E
- Country: Italy
- Region: Tuscany
- Province: Siena (SI)
- Comune: Castelnuovo Berardenga; Siena (partially)
- Elevation: 313 m (1,027 ft)

Population (2011)
  - Total: 276
- Time zone: UTC+1 (CET)
  - Summer (DST): UTC+2 (CEST)

San Giovanni a Cerreto is a village in Tuscany, central Italy, administratively a frazione of the comune of Castelnuovo Berardenga, province of Siena. At the time of the 2001 census its population was 276.

San Giovanni a Cerreto is about 10 km from Siena and 15 km from Castelnuovo Berardenga.
