= Villa di Geggiano, Castelnuovo Berardenga =

Neoclassical-style rural palace in Siena, Tuscany, Italy

Coordinates: 43.3577°N 11.3823°E

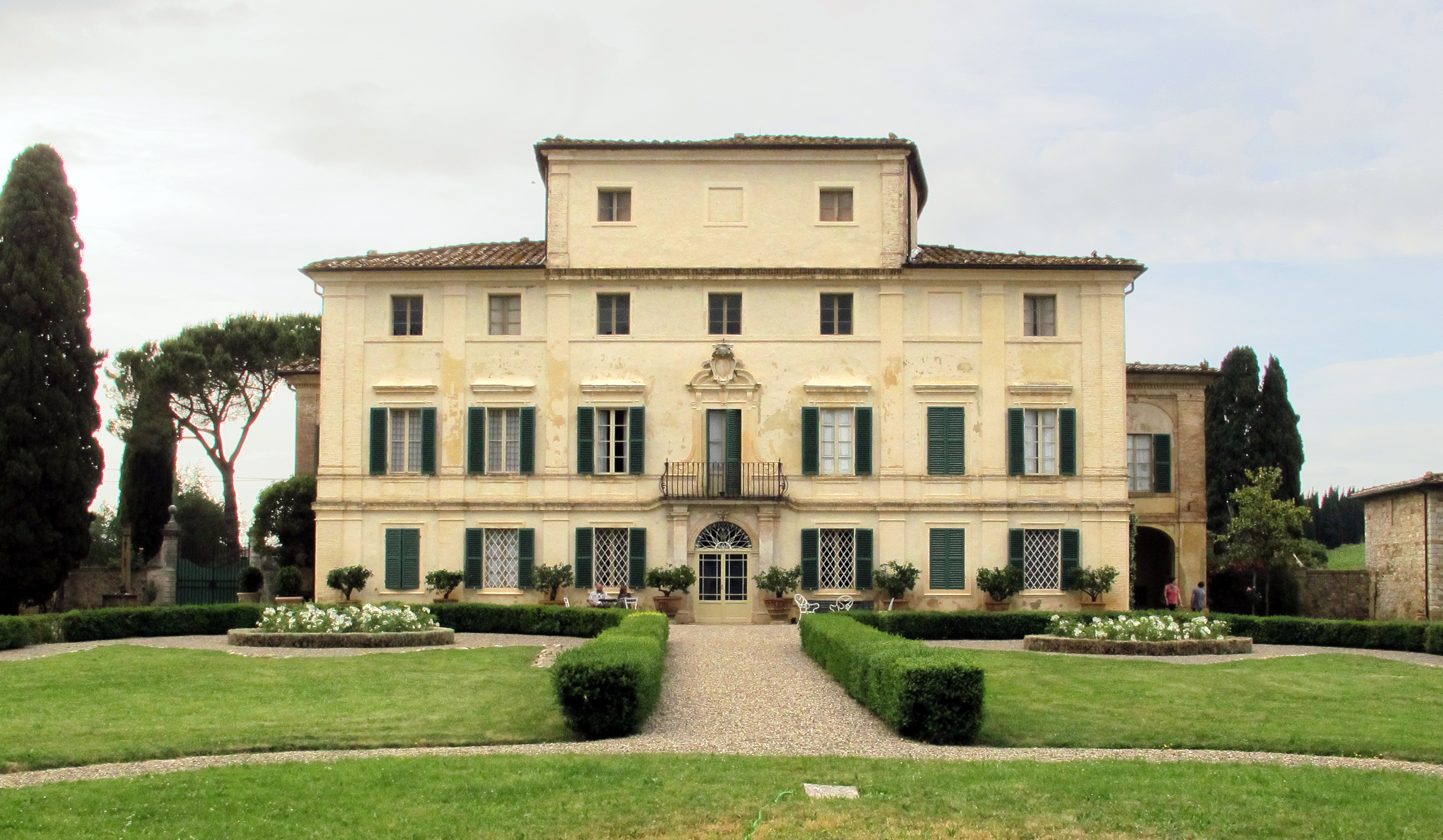
Villa di Geggiano

The Villa di Geggiano is a neoclassical-style rural palace located on Via di Geggiano 1, in the neighborhood of Pianella of the commune of Castelnuovo Berardenga, in province of Siena, region of Tuscany, Italy.

== History ==
A farm house at the site has belonged to the Bianchi Bandinelli family since 1527, when it was included in the dowry of Girolama Santi when she was wed to Girolamo Bandinelli. In 1768, in part to celebrate the marriage of Anton Domenico Bianchi Bandinelli with Cecilia Chigi Zondadari, the property was converted into an elegant villa with its private chapel and gardens.

The interiors contain frescoes (1768–1779) depicting portraits of the family and friends, and of the seasons painted by Ignazio Moder. The stucco work was by François Joseph Bosio, and the Madonna painted for the chapel by Cicori. Further refurbishments were added in the 19th century.

The formal Italianate gardens also have architectural elements elaborated by the sculptor Bosio. It includes an outdoor theater used for performances by Vittorio Alfieri, who was a host at the house. The villa is used for weddings, meetings and events, there are also two rental suites on the property. Villa di Geggiano produces their own branded organic olive oil and houses a winery within the grounds.
