= Santi Giacomo e Niccolò, Quercegrossa =

Roman Catholic parish church in Tuscany, Italy

Coordinates: 43°23′35.34″N 11°18′32.12″E

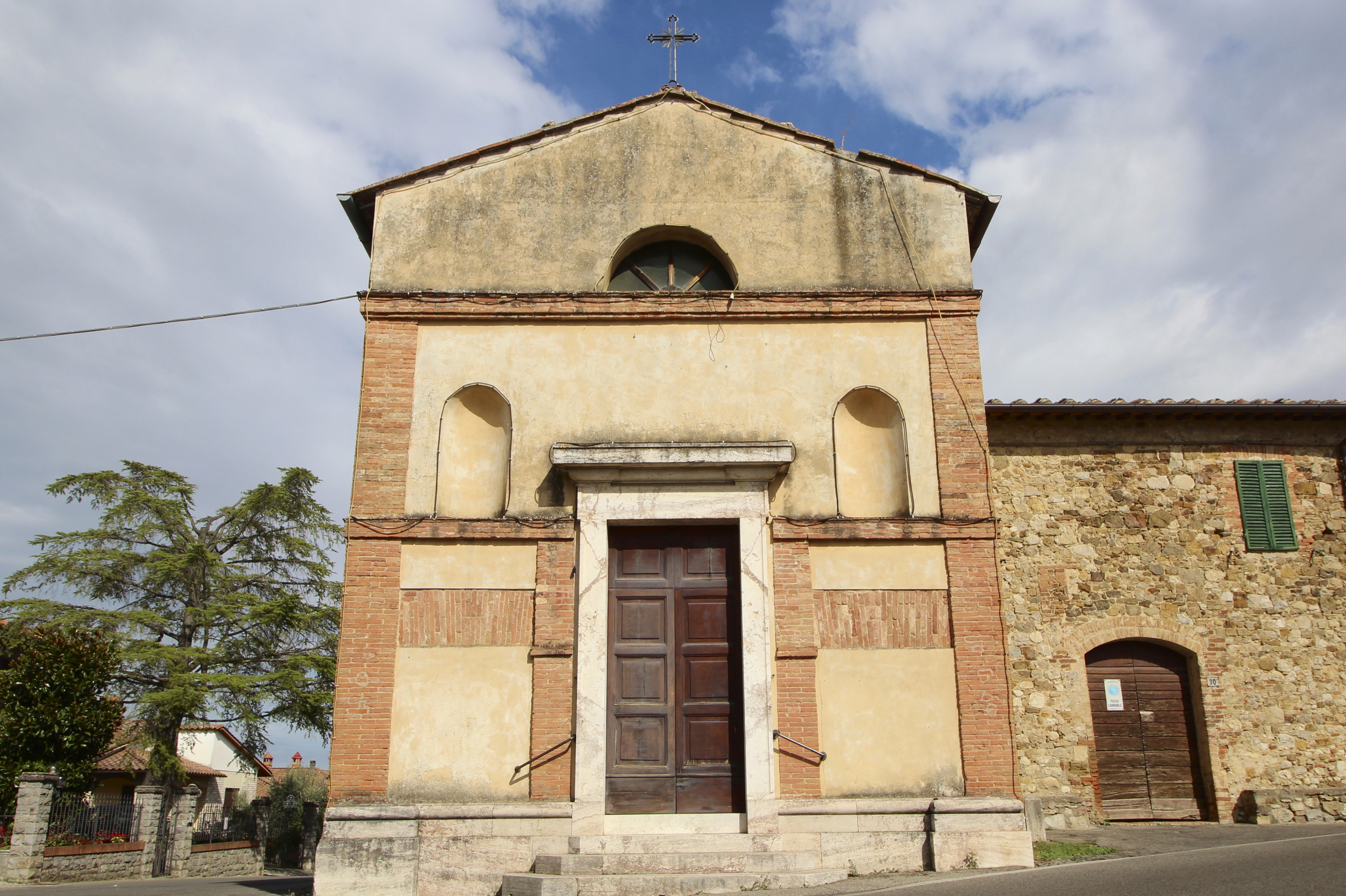
The church Santi Giacomo e Niccolò

Santi Giacomo e Niccolò is a Roman Catholic parish church in the village of Quercegrossa, within the municipal limits of Castelnuovo Berardenga, a few kilometers outside of Siena, region of Tuscany, Italy.

== History ==
The church was originally ancient, built in romanesque-style, but has undergone numerous reconstructions, including major ones in the early 19th century, and in 1957. Traces of the romanesque structure remain on the left side. Once serving a parish church, since 2011 services have mainly transferred to a new parish church. The church still houses a late 15th-century polychrome sculptural group of the Pietà, a masterwork of Francesco di Giorgio Martini, likely assisted by Giacomo Cozzarelli. The work was brought here from the now-razed Olivetan monastery of San Benedetto fuori Porta Tufi in Siena.

An inventory in 1840 also noted the presence of altarpieces depicting San Giacomo by Martelli, a Madonna by Matteo de Giovanni (possibly Matteo Giovanetti), and a processional standard by likely Annibale Mazzuoli.
