= Ponte a Bozzone =

- Frazione
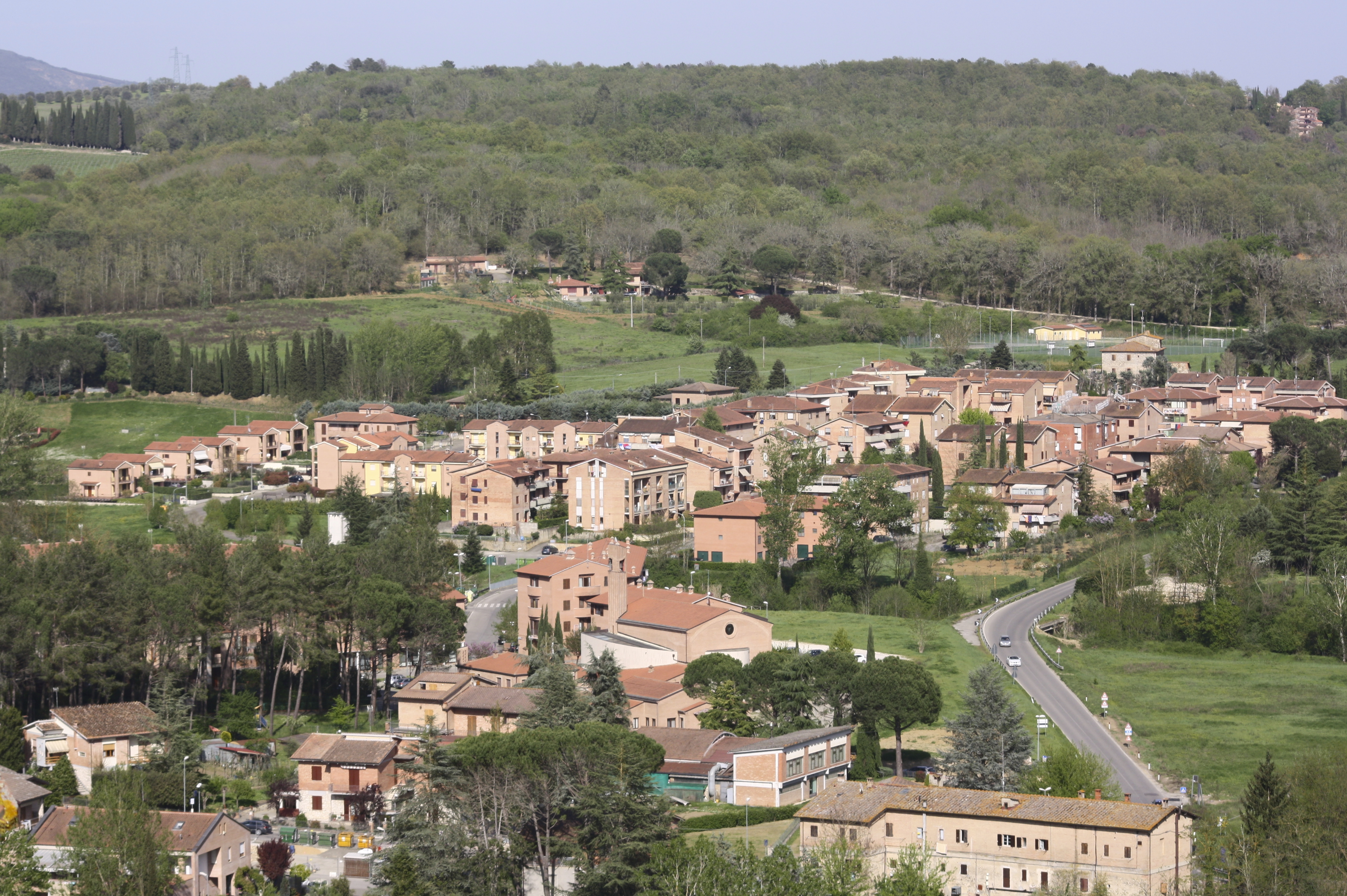
- View of Ponte a Bozzone

- Location of Ponte a Bozzone in Italy
- Coordinates: 43°20′55″N 11°22′21″E
- Country: Italy
- Region: Tuscany
- Province: Siena (SI)
- Comune: Castelnuovo Berardenga
- Elevation: 235 m (771 ft)

Population (2011)
  - Total: 851
- Time zone: UTC+1 (CET)
  - Summer (DST): UTC+2 (CEST)

Ponte a Bozzone is a village in Tuscany, central Italy, administratively a frazione of the comune of Castelnuovo Berardenga, province of Siena. At the time of the 2001 census its population was 630.

Ponte a Bozzone is about 8 km from Siena and 17 km from Castelnuovo Berardenga.

== Sport ==
The 2025 Strade Bianche Donne passed through Ponte a Bozzone.
