= San Michele Arcangelo, Paganico =

Church in Paganico, Italy

Coordinates: 42.931436°N 11.270594°E

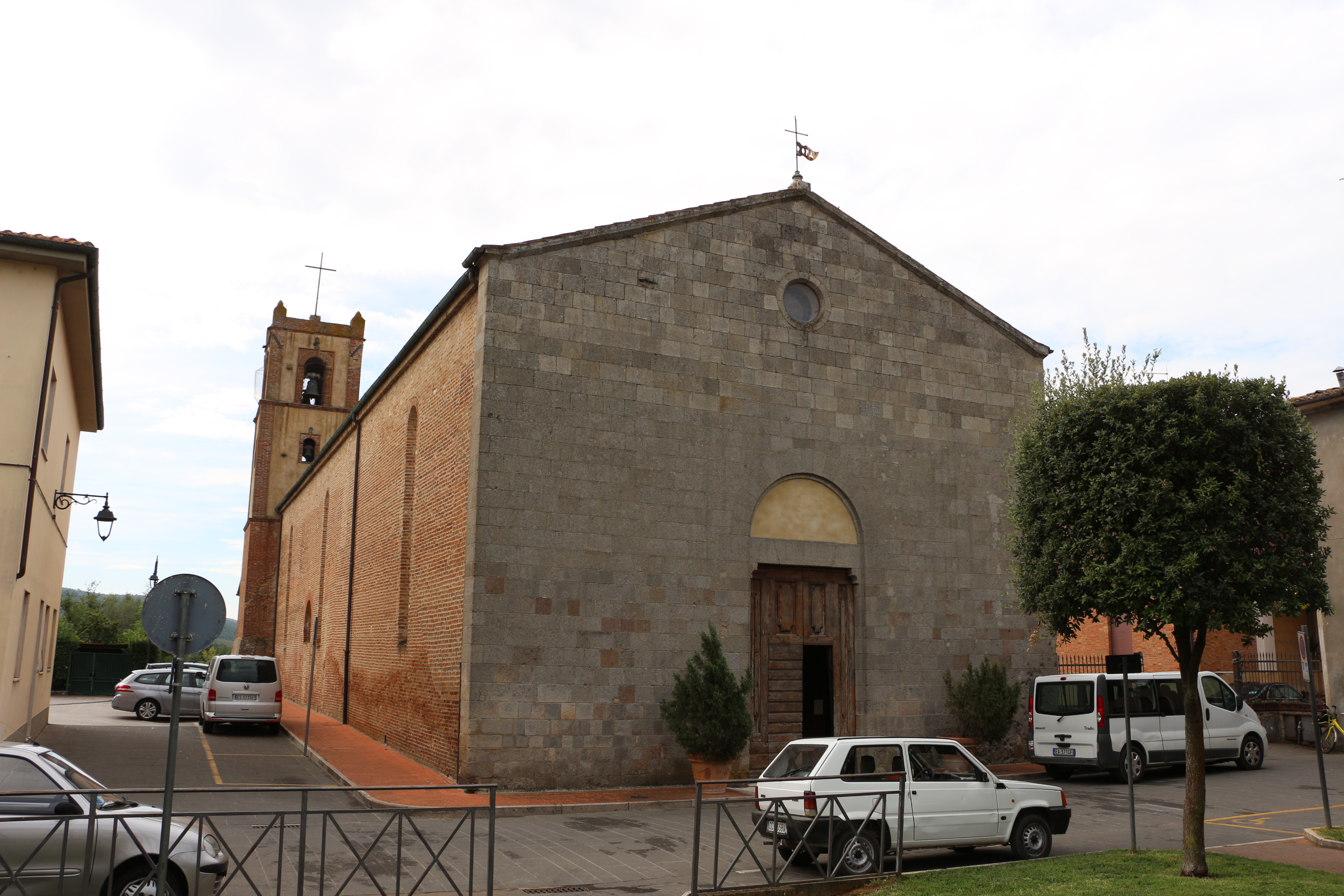
Facade of Church

San Michele Arcangelo is a Romanesque-style, Roman Catholic church located on Piazza della Vittoria #4 in the town of Paganico, Province of Grosseto, region of Tuscany, Italy.

== History ==
This church was commissioned by the monastic order of the Umiliati, who built this church between 1297 and 1345, next to a former convent. The dedication suggests an earlier Lombard church was present at the site. The rectangular building with a single nave has undergone a number of reconstructions. The interiors contain frescoes completed in 1368 by Biagio di Goro Ghezzi, depicting the Story of St Michael, the Annunciation, and the Nativity. In addition, there are allegorical depictions of the four evangelists and portraits of Saints. The style recalls the influence of Ambrogio Lorenzetti. The main altarpiece depicts an Enthroned Madonna and Saints by Guidoccio Cozzarelli. The altar has a wooden ciborium sculpted by Bartolomeo Neroni, also called “il Riccio”. The church houses a polychrome wooden crucifix.

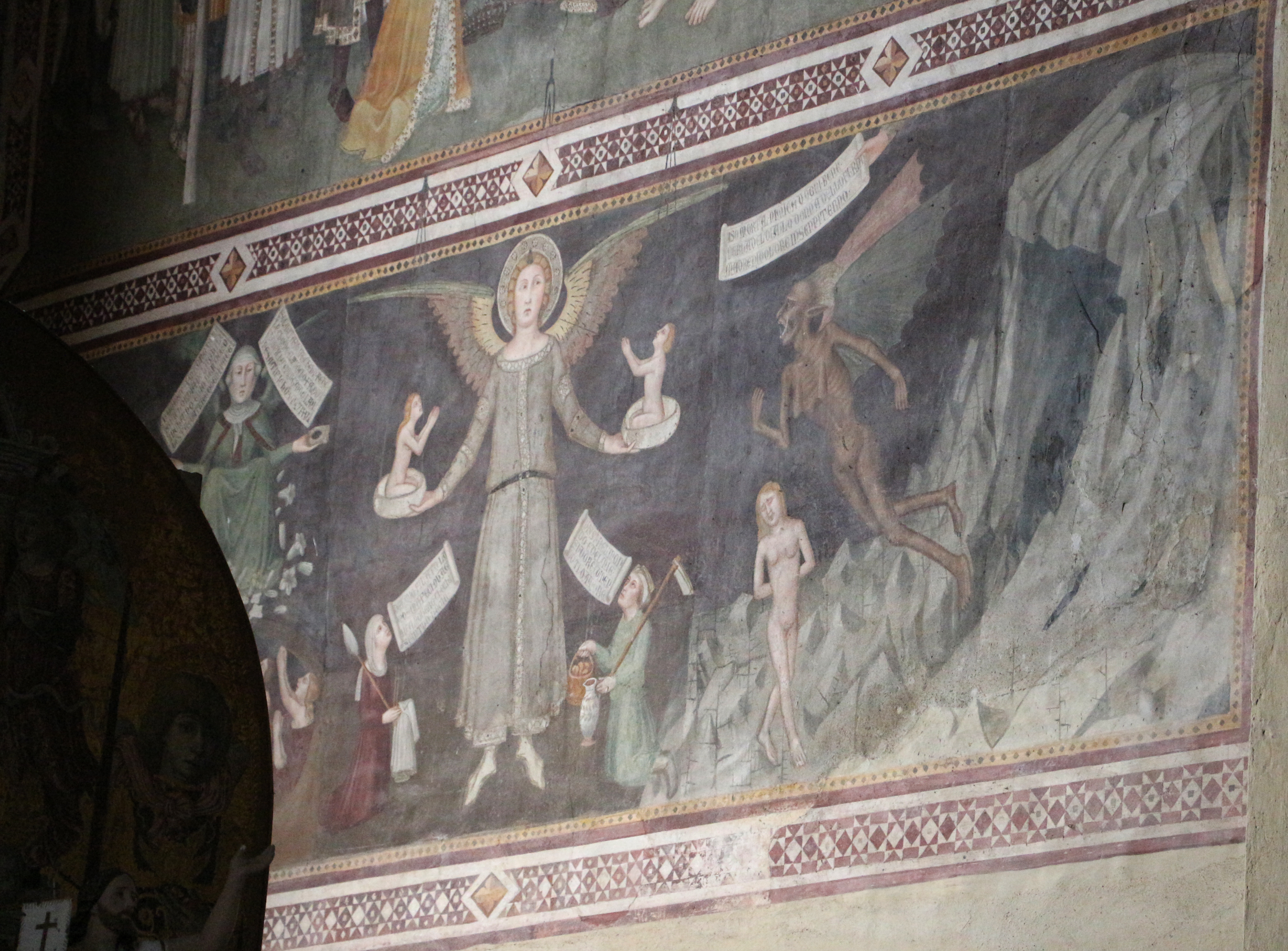
The Last Judgement: Weighing of Souls by Biagio di Goro Ghezzi
