= Prospero Fagnani =

Italian canon lawyer (1588–1678)

Reverend Prospero Fagnani
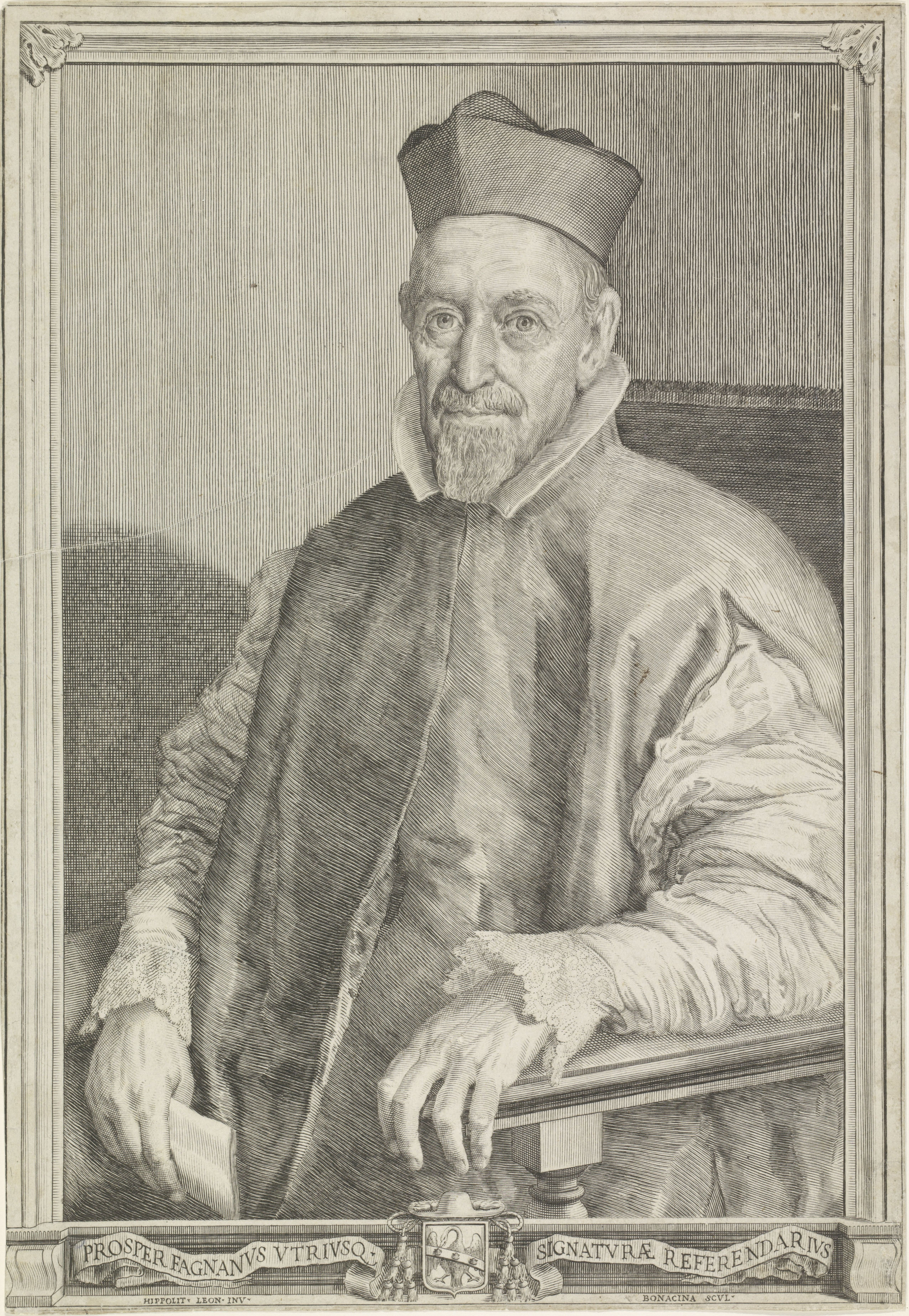
- Engraved portrait of Fagnani by Giovanni Battista Bonacina, based on work by Ippolito Leoni. Rijksmuseum, Amsterdam.
- Born: Prospero Fagnani Boni; 2 July 1588; Sant'Angelo in Vado, Papal States
- Died: 17 August 1678 (aged 90); Rome, Papal States
- Occupations: Catholic priest; canon lawyer; legal scholar
- Known for: Commentary of the Decretals of Gregory IX

Academic background
- Education: University of Perugia

Academic work
- Discipline: Jurisprudence
- Sub-discipline: Canon law

Prospero Fagnani Boni (2 July 1588 – 17 August 1678) was an Italian canon lawyer.

== Biography ==
It is certain that he studied at Perugia. At the age of twenty he was a doctor of civil and canon law; at twenty-two, secretary of the Congregation of the Council. He held this office for fifteen years. He fulfilled the same functions in several other Roman Congregations. It is not certain that he ever lectured on canon law at the Roman University (Sapienza).

He became blind at the age of forty-four. This affliction did not prevent him from devoting himself to canonical studies and from writing a commentary of the Decretals of Gregory IX, which gained for him the title of Doctor Caecus Oculatissimus, i.e. "the Blind yet Most Far-Sighted Doctor". This commentary includes interpretations of the texts of the most difficult of the Decretals of Gregory IX. It is distinguished by the clearness with which the most complex and disputed questions of canon law are explained. The work is also of value for the purpose of ascertaining the practice of the Roman Congregations, especially that of the Congregation of the Council, of which the author quotes numerous decisions.

Pope Benedict XIV gave this work the highest praise, and its authority is still continually appealed to in the Roman Congregations. It is divided, like the Decretals of Gregory IX, into five books. The first edition was published at Rome, in 1661, under the title of Jus canonicum seu commentaria absolutissima in quinque libros Decretalium. It has been reprinted several times.

Fagnani is reproached with excessive rigour in his commentary on the chapter of the Decretals "Ne innitaris" (Book I, De constitutionibus), in which he combats the doctrine of probabilism. Saint Alphonsus calls him magnus rigoristarum princeps, "the great prince of the rigorists" (Homo apostolicus, Tract. I, no. 63; Theologia Moralis, IV, no. 669).
