= Vagliagli =

- Frazione
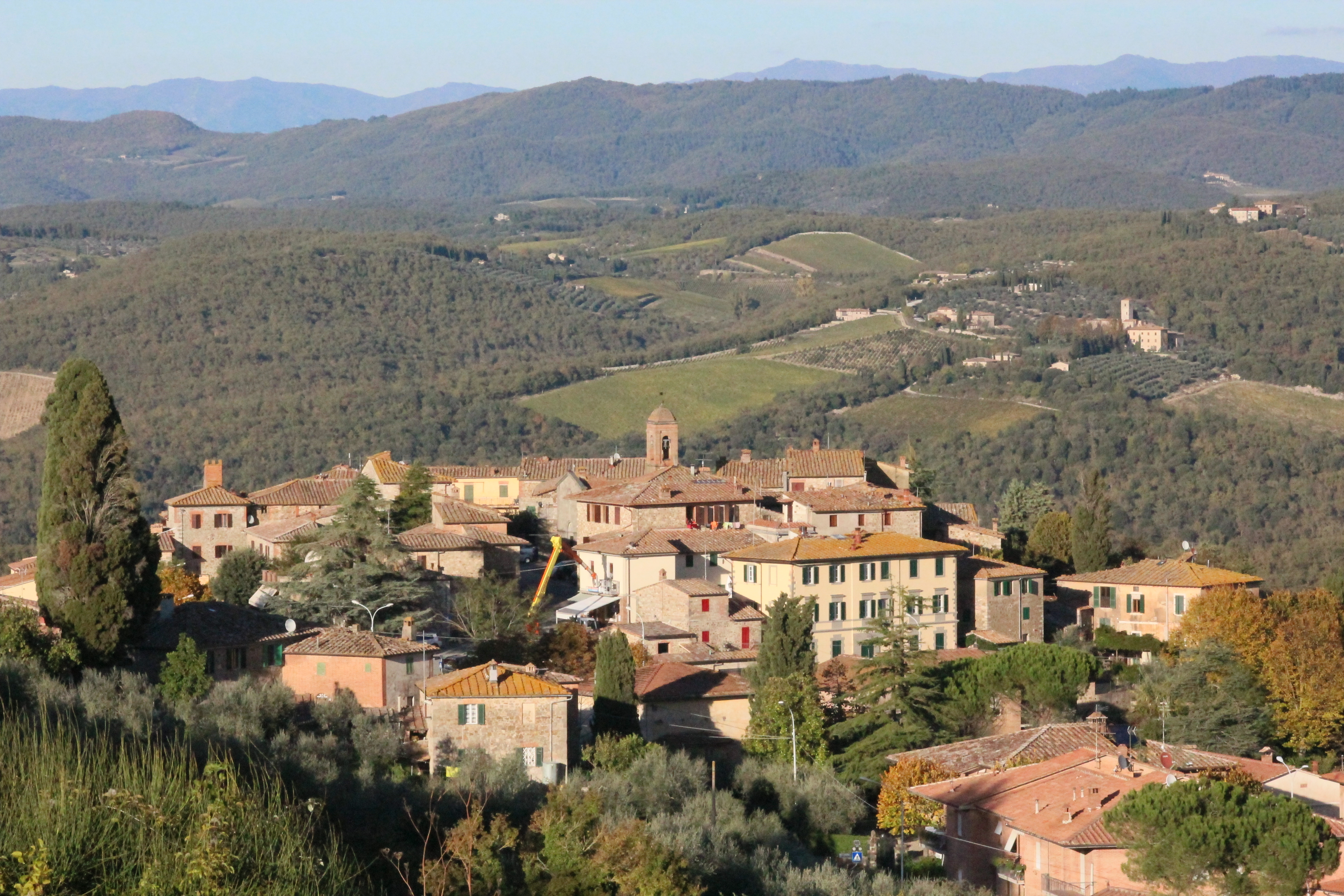
- View of Vagliagli

- Location of Vagliagli in Italy
- Coordinates: 43°25′15″N 11°20′50″E
- Country: Italy
- Region: Tuscany
- Province: Siena (SI)
- Comune: Castelnuovo Berardenga
- Elevation: 511 m (1,677 ft)

Population (2011)
  - Total: 242
- Demonym: Vagliaglini
- Time zone: UTC+1 (CET)
  - Summer (DST): UTC+2 (CEST)

Vagliagli is a village in Tuscany, central Italy, administratively a frazione of the comune of Castelnuovo Berardenga, province of Siena. At the time of the 2001 census its population was 386.

Vagliagli is about 16 km from Siena and 27 km from Castelnuovo Berardenga.
