= San Gusmè =

- Frazione
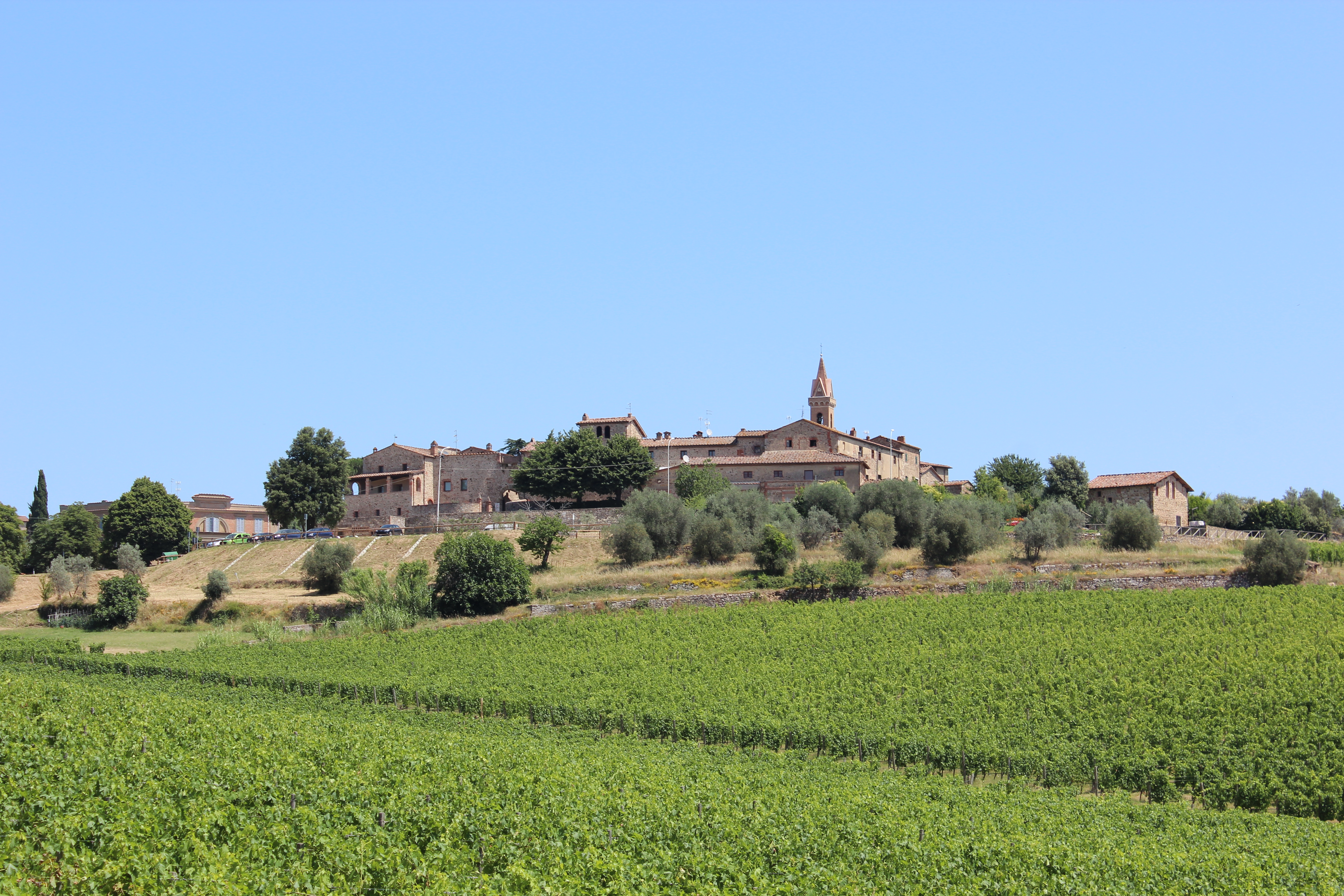
- View of San Gusmè

- Location of San Gusmè in Italy
- Coordinates: 43°23′17″N 11°29′51″E
- Country: Italy
- Region: Tuscany
- Province: Siena (SI)
- Comune: Castelnuovo Berardenga
- Elevation: 461 m (1,512 ft)

Population (2011)
  - Total: 239
- Demonym: Sangusmeini
- Time zone: UTC+1 (CET)
  - Summer (DST): UTC+2 (CEST)

San Gusmè is a village in Tuscany, central Italy, administratively a frazione of the comune of Castelnuovo Berardenga, province of Siena. At the time of the 2001 census its population was 250.

San Gusmè is about 23 km from Siena and 4 km from Castelnuovo Berardenga.
