= Castelnuovo Berardenga =

- Comune
- Comune di Castelnuovo Berardenga
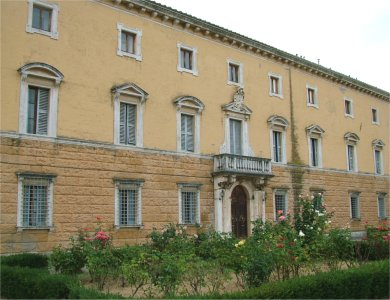
- Villa Chigi.

- Coat of arms

- Location within Italy Location within Tuscany
- Coordinates: 43°20′50″N 11°30′15″E
- Country: Italy
- Region: Tuscany
- Province: Siena (SI)
- Frazioni: Casetta, Monteaperti, Pianella, Pievasciata, Ponte a Bozzone, Quercegrossa, San Giovanni a Cerreto, San Gusmè, Vagliagli, Villa a Sesta

Government
  - Mayor: Fabrizio Nepi

Area
  - Total: 177.11 km^{2} (68.38 sq mi)
- Elevation: 351 m (1,152 ft)

Population (December 2022)
  - Total: 8,933
  - Density: 50.44/km^{2} (130.6/sq mi)
- Demonym: Castelnovini
- Time zone: UTC+1 (CET)
  - Summer (DST): UTC+2 (CEST)
- Postal code: 53019
- Dialing code: 0577
- Saint day: June 5
- Website: Official website

Castelnuovo Berardenga is a comune (municipality) in the province of Siena in the Italian region Tuscany, located about 50 kilometres (31 mi) southeast of Florence and about 14 kilometres (9 mi) east of Siena. Since 1932 it has been included in the Chianti wine-production area.

The Battle of Montaperti between Guelphs and Ghibellines was fought nearby on 4 September 1260.

The territory of Castelnuovo Berardenga borders that of the comuni of Asciano, Bucine, Castellina in Chianti, Gaiole in Chianti, Monteriggioni, Radda in Chianti, Rapolano Terme and Siena.

== Villages and hamlets ==
The comune of Castelnuovo Berardenga includes the frazioni of:

- Casetta
- Monteaperti
- Pianella
- Pievasciata
- Ponte a Bozzone
- Quercegrossa
- San Giovanni a Cerreto
- San Gusmè
- Vagliagli and Villa a Sesta

And the hamlets or smaller villages of:

- Abbazia Monastero
- Barca
- Bivio Santo Stefano
- Bossi
- Campi
- Castell'In Villa
- Castelnuovo Scalo
- Catignano
- Chieci
- Cignano
- Colonna del Grillo
- Corsignano
- Curina
- Geggiano
- Guistrigona
- La Ripa
- Monaciano
- Monastero d'Ombrone
- Pacina
- Petroio
- Poggiarello-La Ripa
- Pontignanello
- Pontignano
- Rosennano
- San Felice
- San Giovanni
- San Piero
- San Vito
- Santa Chiara
- Santa Margherita-La Suvera
- Santa Maria a Dofana
- Sestano
- Stellino
- Villa d'Arceno
- Vitignano

== Main sights ==
- Castello di Montalto

=== Villas ===
- Villa Arceno
- Villa di Catignano o Villa Sergardi
- Villa Chigi Lucarini Saracini
- Villa di Geggiano or Villa Bianchi-Bandinelli
- Villa di Monaciano
- Villa Pagliaia
- Villa di Sestano
- Villa di Fagnano or Villa Terrosi Vagnoli

=== Churches ===
- Propositura dei Santi Giusto e Clemente
- Pieve di Santa Maria a Pàcina
- Pieve di San Felice a Bossi
- Pieve dei Santi Cosma e Damiano (San Gusmè)
- Pieve di San Giovanni Battista (Pieve Asciata)
- Pieve di Santa Maria (Villa a Sesta)
- Chiesa di San Cristoforo a Vagliagli
- Chiesa di San Pietro (Canonica a Cerreto)
- Chiesa di Sant'Ansano a Dofàna
- Chiesa dei Santi Giacomo e Niccolò (Quercegrossa)
- Chiesa di San Giovanni Evangelista (Cerreto)
- Chiesa di San Bartolomeo (Sestano)
- Cappella di San Giovanni (Villa di Arceno)
- Cappella di Santa Croce (Villa Sergardi di Catignano)
- Cappella della Madonna del Rosario (Villa Bianchi-Bandinelli)
- Certosa di Pontignano (Certosa di San Pietro)
- Monastery of San Salvatore (Badia Monastero)
