= Ombrone =

Coordinates: 42°39′31″N 11°00′47″E

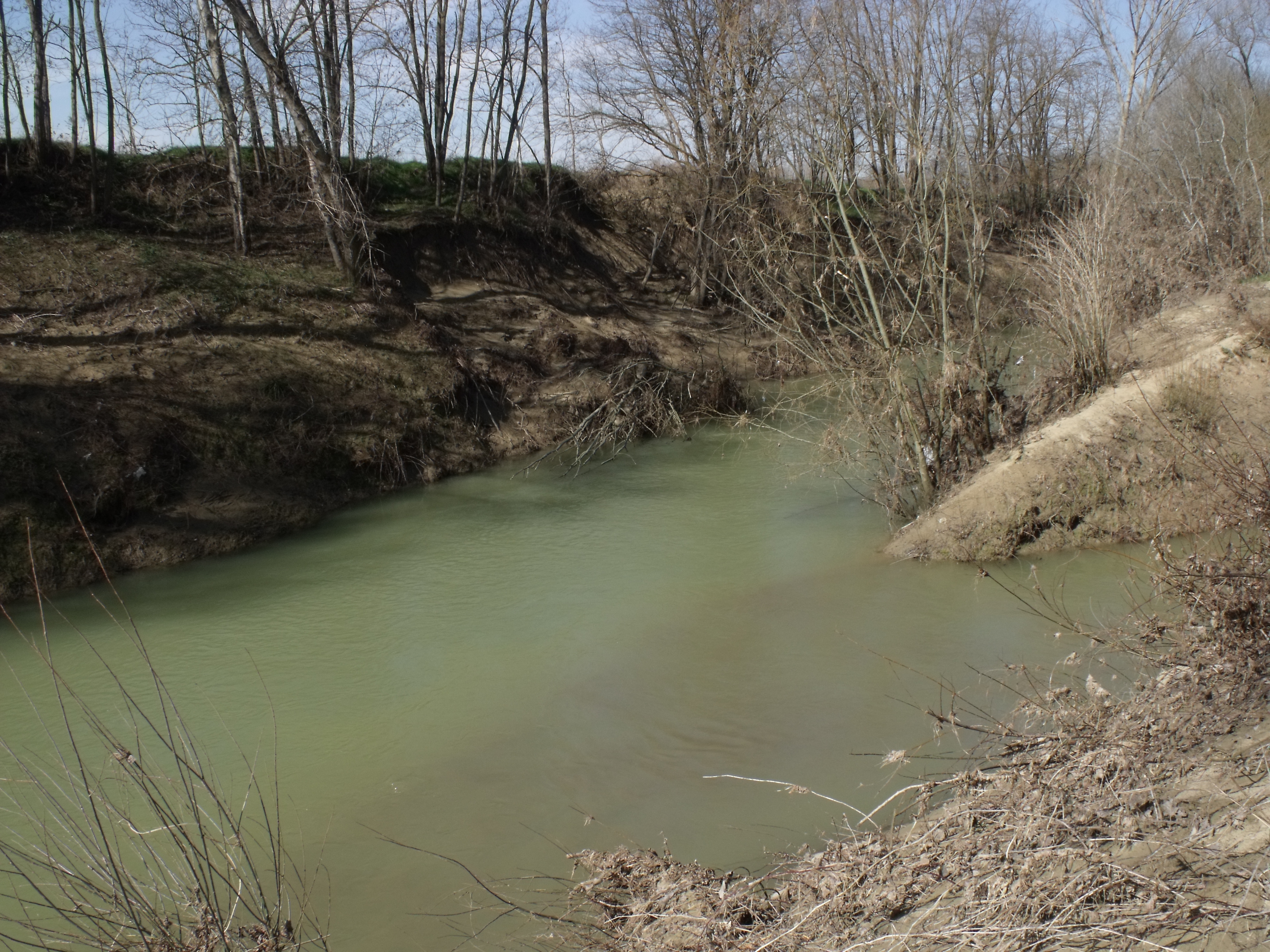
- Confluence of the Arbia (left) and Ombrone (right) south of Buonconvento.

Location
- Country: Italy

Physical characteristics
- Source
  - location: San Gusmè
  - elevation: about 420 m (1,380 ft)
- Mouth
  - location: Tyrrhenian Sea
- Length: 160 km (99 mi)
- Basin size: 3,494 km^{2} (1,349 sq mi)
- Discharge
  - average: 32 m^{3}/s (1,100 cu ft/s) at the mouth

The Ombrone (Latin: Umbro) is a 160-kilometre-long (99 mi) river situated in the provinces of Grosseto and Siena, central Italy.

The Ombrone's source is at San Gusmè, near Castelnuovo Berardenga, on the south-eastern side of the Monti del Chianti. After a twisting route, it receives the waters of the tributaries Arbia, Merse and Orcia before reaching the plain of Grosseto near Istia d'Ombrone.

It subsequently passes through the outskirts of the city of Grosseto, before flowing into the Tyrrhenian Sea at Bocca d'Ombrone.

== See also ==
- Ombrone (department)
