= Ulisse De Matteis =

Florentine artist

Ulisse De Matteis (1827–1910) was a Florentine artist who worked primarily in stained glass. De Matteis created windows for many of the most important monuments in Tuscany and Liguria, including the Bargello, Florence Cathedral, Santa Croce, Santa Trinita, Siena Cathedral, Prato Cathedral, San Michele in Foro in Lucca, Genoa Cathedral, Mackenzie Castle, and San Francesco d'Albaro. De Matteis' work is also found in England, in the Church of St. Mary in Lastingham.

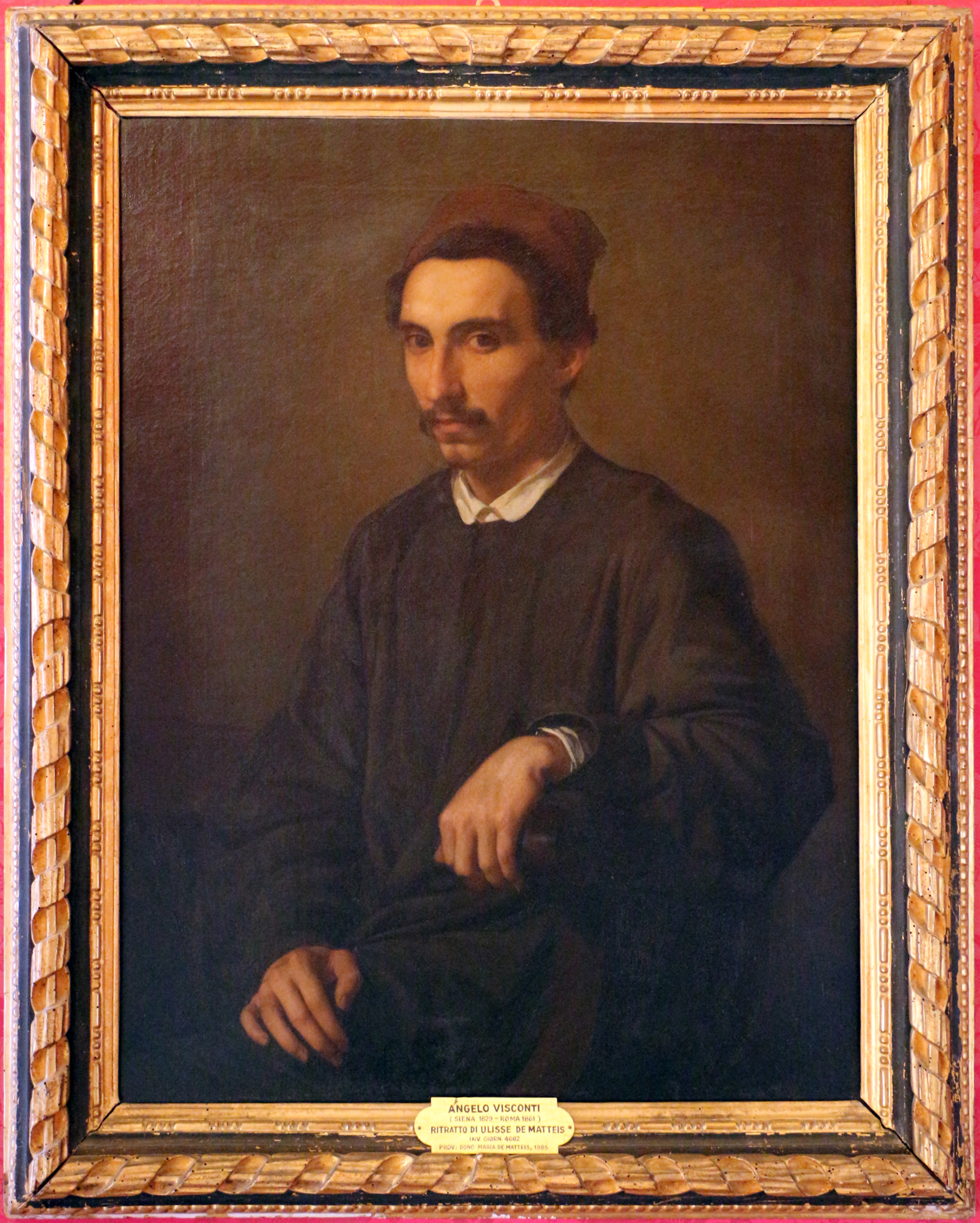
Angelo Visconti, Portrait of Ulisse De Matteis, oil on canvas, 1857. Galleria d'arte moderna, Florence.

== Biography ==
=== Birth and death dates ===
Stained-glass artist Ulisse De Matteis was born in Florence, most likely in 1827. However, Angelo De Gubernatis, in his Dictionary of Living Italian Artists, reports that De Matteis was born in 1828, and this date has been repeated in numerous other biographies of the artist. The baptismal records in the archives of Florence cathedral do not contain a record of any De Matteis births in 1828. There are records in other years for two births, either of which could be the artist Ulisse De Matteis: Giuseppe Enrico Ulisse De Matteis born in 1827 or Enrico Ulisse De Matteis born in 1830. The record of Ulisse's death in the Ufficio Anagrafe (Registry office) in Florence lists his birth year as 1827, making it almost certain that he was born in 1827. Ulisse's death in 1910 is recorded both in his obituary and in the Ufficio Anagrafe in Florence.

=== Early life and the founding of the workshop ===
Early in his life, De Matteis worked in his father Clemente's engraving shop and had planned to continue in his father's profession. However, in 1848, he volunteered for the first Italian War of Independence, when Italians were fighting for liberation from the Hapsburg Austrian Empire, which had ruled Tuscany since the death of the last Medici Gian Gastone in 1737. During the war, De Matteis was imprisoned with the Florentine academic painter Stefano Ussi; apparently, it was Ussi who encouraged De Matteis to abandon engraving and pursue painting.

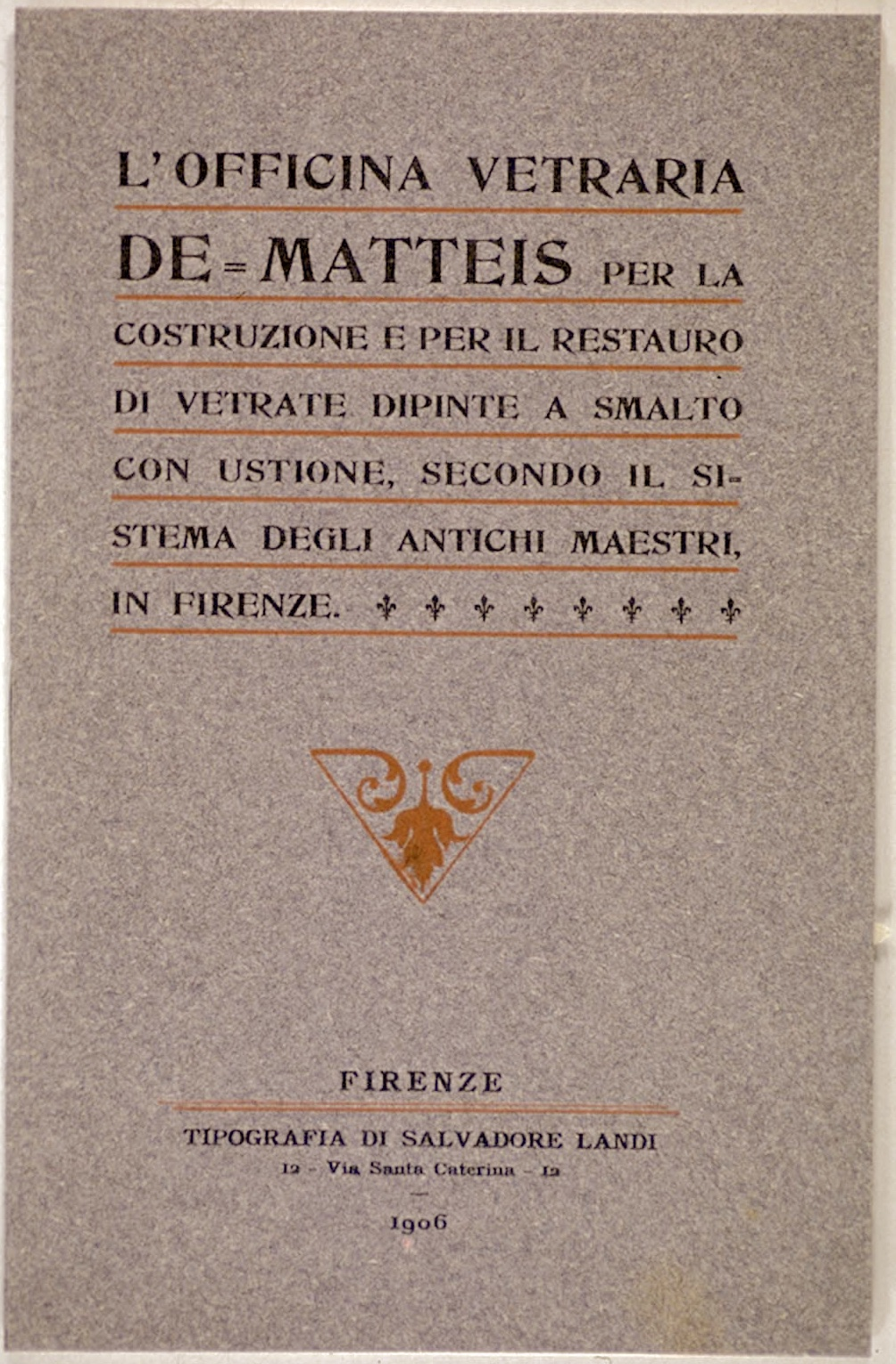
Cover of a catalog for the De Matteis workshop published in 1906 when the firm was run by Sergio and Ulisse De Matteis.

Upon his return to Florence in 1849, De Matteis attended figure drawing classes at the Accademia di Belle Arti and kept company at the Caffè Michelangelo in Via Larga (now Via Cavour), where he came to know the Macchiaioli painters, including Telemaco Signorini and Giovanni Fattori, both noted as his friends in his obituary. This group, described by art historian Albert Boime as "close to the radical working-class movement led by the master baker Giuseppe Dolfi in Florence," advocated for Tuscan independence and for the political unification of the Italian peninsula. De Matteis' working-class background united him with several of the artists who frequented the Caffè Michelangelo, including Vincenzo Cabianca and Giovanni Fattori. The only known extant image of the artist was painted in 1857 by the Sienese artist Angelo Visconti during Visconti's stay in Florence. In the portrait, De Matteis wears a velvet cap similar to those worn by several figures in the entourage of the young king in Benozzo Gozzoli's 1459-60 Procession of the Magi in the chapel of the Palazzo Medici. While the collar is modern, the robe De Matteis wears resembles those worn by men in fifteenth-century Florentine portraits by artists such as Botticelli.

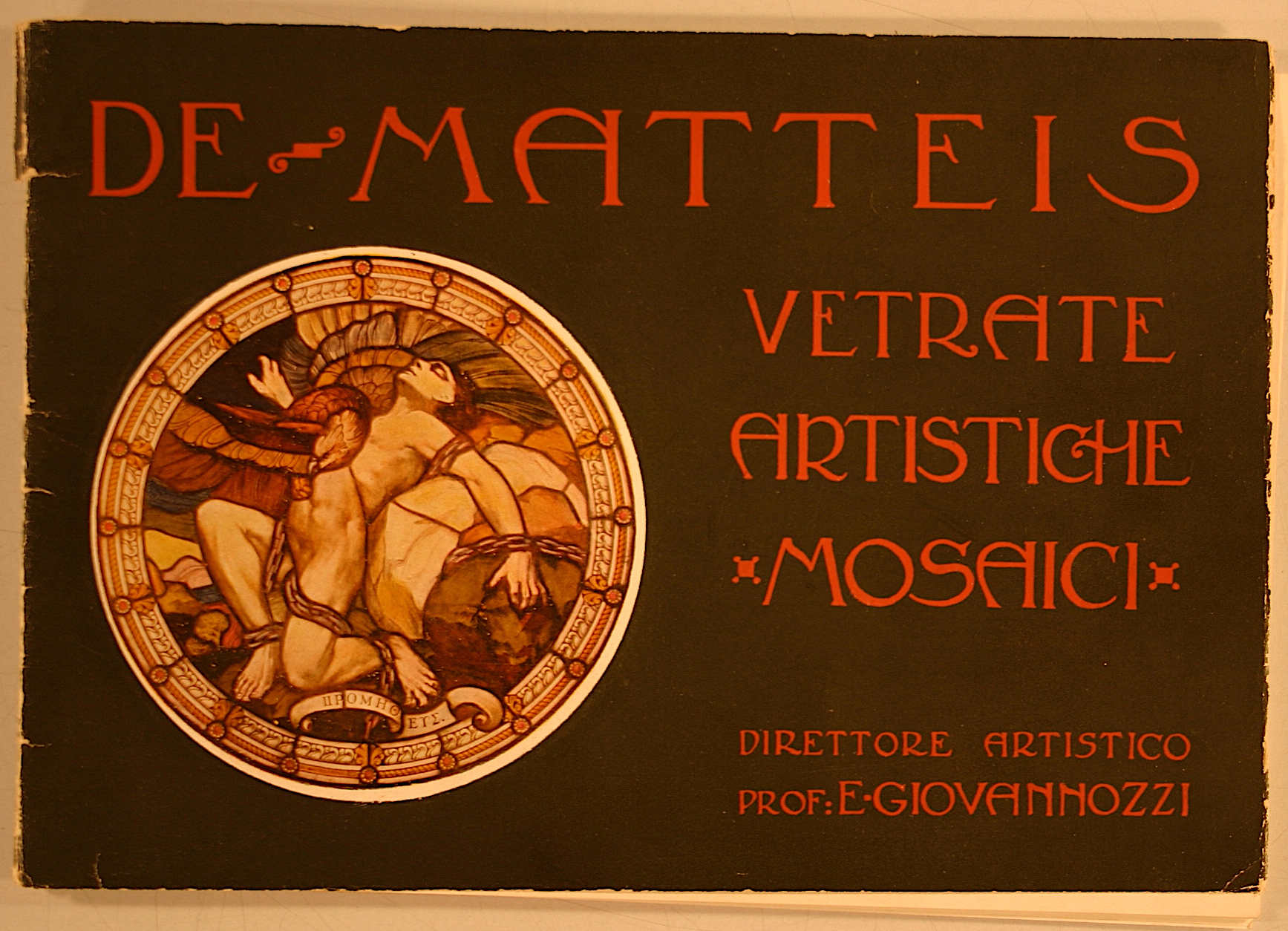
Cover of the 1915 catalog published by the De Matteis firm when it was under the direction of Ezio Giovanozzi, Ulisse De Matteis' son-in-law.

In the 1850s, the painter-restorer Gaetano Bianchi encouraged De Matteis to pursue stained glass; De Matteis then turned to Emilio Bechi, a prominent chemist at the Istituto Tecnico in Florence, for advice on how to make enameled pigments. With capital and workshop space provided by the glass company of Carlo and Giuseppe Francini and the expertise of Natale Bruschi in cutting and leading glass, De Matteis founded his workshop in 1859 in the Via Guelfa in Florence. Throughout their collaboration, which lasted well into the 1880s, Bruschi fabricated the windows according to De Matteis' designs, and De Matteis then painted the glass with enameled pigments—a process that followed the practices of medieval stained-glass artists.

=== Family life and family business ===
At the same time he was preparing to launch his stained-glass workshop, De Matteis married his first wife Elena Paoli. The couple had three children:

- Ferdinando Vittorio Italiano (1859–60)
- Elettra Italia Isolina (1861–1932) grew up in her father's workshop and became an artist herself; her stained-glass windows and paintings were included in several exhibitions.
- Maria Zaira Elisabetta (b. 1863, died as a child)

In 1875, Ulisse married his second wife, the artist Veronica Vespini degli Innocenti (1854 Arezzo-1910 Florence). Veronica was a practicing artist who exhibited her work, sometimes alongside Elettra, her stepdaughter, and Ulisse. Veronica and Ulisse had five children, four of whom survived into adulthood:

- Eva Marzia Luisa (1876–1908)
- Maria Marzia Elettra (b. 1878, likely died as a child)
- Sergio Ettore (1882–1907)
- Rita Landa Giuseppina (b. 1887); married Ezio Giovannozzi (1882–1964) in 1909
- Maria Berta Marzia (1898–1988).

By the late 1890s, the De Matteis workshop was a family enterprise. In a 1979 interview with Maria De Matteis, published in the catalog of an exhibition of her work as a costume designer, she reminisces: "Earlier, as a child, I worked with my father, a painter of stained-glass windows (pittore di vetrate)...And in Corso dei Tintori in Florence, there is, or at least I think it's still there, a stained-glass window that I painted. The family environment was formative for me. My father, like I said, was a painter, and my mother a miniature painter, she made miniature paintings even for the czars. All of my siblings painted, except my sister Rita, pianist and composer, who married the painter Ezio Giovannozzi." Maria De Matteis' memories are attested to in accounts from the time: in an 1896 account of artists in his book Florence Today (Firenze d'oggi), Ugo Matini remarks that all of the family, even the small children, work together on the company's numerous commissions.

Beginning in about 1904, Sergio and Eva De Matteis co-directed the workshop, although correspondence is signed only from Sergio and Ulisse. On November 1, 1906, the firm moved from its workshop at 67 Via Guelfa to the Palazzo Ricasoli-Firidolfi, in Corso dei Tintori 51-Lungarno delle Grazie 6a. Sergio died in 1907 and Eva in 1908, leaving Ulisse and Veronica in deep sorrow and in search of a new workshop director. In a letter dated July 1908, Ulisse De Matteis assures the Opera of the Cathedral in Siena that following the tragic deaths of his two children, one right after the other, the workshop will continue to produce under the direction of Ezio Giovannozzi, the spouse of Rita Landa, with the assistance of the painters Ricciardo Meacci and Arturo Villigiardo. In the letter, written just two years before his own death in 1910, Ulisse laments that while his children will not be able to carry on the traditions he established, he is grateful that such dedicated, talented artists will continue his work.

== Exhibitions and Awards ==
- 1861, Florence, Italian National Exhibition (L'Esposizione nazionale italiana del 1861). Antonio Pavan reports that De Matteis' window of the Assumption of the Virgin created for San Miniato (al Tedesco), Cathedral won a prize at this exhibition. In the exhibition catalog, the window is listed as a product of the Francini company and described as a vetrate gotica—a Gothic stained-glass window. In the list of prizes given at the exhibition is: "Francini, Giuseppe, di Firenze; —per la diligente imitazione di una vetrata gotica rappresentante l'Assunzione (Francini, Giuseppe of Florence;-for the diligent imitation of a Gothic stained-glass window representing The Assumption)."
- 1862, London, International Exhibition. De Matteis won a prize for what Pavan describes as an elegant rectangular window depicting allegories referring to the Italian Risorgimento. This exhibition was held at the South Kensington Museum, now the Victoria and Albert.
- 1869, Padua, Exhibition of Industrial Agriculture and Fine Arts of the Province of Padua (Esposizione agricola industriale e di belle arti della Provincia di Padova). In his observations on the fine arts at the exhibition, the architect and art historian Pietro Selvatico writes that "the stained-glass window of De Matteis and Bruschi of Florence representing the entire figure of the Virgin was well placed with light behind it, so that one could see the vibrancy of the colors and the clean lines that form the drapery folds, taken from the traditions of the 14th century. Too bad the head didn't fit in with the rest of the window and that the colorful border around the window took away from its overall harmony!"
- 1870, Rome, Exhibition of Catholic Art. Antonio Pavan includes an engraving of the window that De Matteis exhibited in Rome and remarks that the window makes it difficult to decide whether cav. De Matteis is more able in the technical aspects of his art or in his designs and inventions, because he is inspired by perfect examples of ancient (antica) Italian art. Because the window was on display at the time Pavan was writing, he tells his readers it's up to them to decide!
- 1873, Vienna, World's Fair. The Francini Company won the "Medaglia del buon gusto" (Medal of good taste) in the ecclesiastical arts section of the exhibition. In a discussion of the Italian ecclesiastical arts on exhibit in Vienna, Ulisse de Matteis is named as the director of the Francini company and Natale Bruschi is named as his collaborator.
- 1877, Florence, Artistic-Industrial Exposition (Esposizione artistico-industriale). According to the exhibition catalog, De Matteis and the Francini company exhibited both drawings of extant stained-glass windows and a stained-glass window. In one of a series of letters written by Antonio Pavan on the 1877 Florence exhibition, he describes "the beautiful stained-glass window painted by Cav. De Matteis of the Francini company. This Madonna Enthroned, designed in the best way possible and colored with unsurpassed confidence and vivacity, received deserved honors at the sacred exhibition in Rome and at the world exhibition in Vienna."
- 1887, Florence, Tuscan Regional Exhibition of Construction Materials, Decorations and Finishing Works. Natale Bruschi, Francini, and De Matteis exhibited separately in this show. De Matteis won a gold medal for his work. The list of works shown by De Matteis include: a medieval stained-glass window; several designs for stained-glass windows representing the "Regina degli Apostoli" (Queen of the Apostles), S. Carlo Borromeo, and Christ; a sketch of one of the large stained-glass windows in the Cathedral of Florence (Santa Maria del Fiore); a medieval style stained-glass window containing a representation of St. George, carried out by Elettra De Matteis; a stained-glass window containing a bust of the Angel of God, carried out by Veronica De Matteis.
- 1889, Rome, Artistic-Industrial Museum, Exhibition of Ceramic and Glass Arts. The index of the catalog for this show includes: De Matteis E. U. e V., which most likely means Elettra, Ulisse, and Veronica De Matteis. The work submitted by the firm is all credited to Veronica De Matteis. The work includes: a stained-glass window painted with vitreous enamels depicting an angel in the center; a stained-glass window showing St. George with an ornamented border; and a window with ornament in the style of Bramante.
- 1890, National Women's Exhibition, Florence (Esposizione Beatrice di Firenze. Mostra nazionale de' lavori femminili in Firenze.). Elettra De Matteis won two silver medals--one for her work in oil, pastel, and watercolor, and one for her stained-glass windows. Veronica De Matteis won a silver medal for her stained-glass windows.

== Commissions 1859-1870 ==
- Florence, Bargello, 1859–60. For the restoration of the Bargello by architect Francesco Mazzei and Gaetano Bianchi, which turned what was a prison into a museum of art, De Matteis made a stained-glass window for the chapel depicting St. John the Baptist and many crown glass windows decorated with coats of arms—all in keeping with the medieval style of the building.
- Florence, Church of Orsanmichele, 1860. Antonio Pavan writes that De Matteis created a large, historiated lunette-shaped window in the same medieval style as the artwork in the church. This window is no longer extant; it was replaced in 1933 with a window by Armando Bruschi.
- San Miniato (al Tedesco), Cathedral, 1861. Pavan records that De Matteis created a circular window in a Gothic style representing the Assumption of the Virgin. This window won him a prize at the 1861 Italian National Exhibition because of its imitation of the style of old windows.
- Siena, Cathedral, Chapel of St. John the Baptist, 1865–66. The window depicting the coat of arms of the Opera of Siena Cathedral was created by the Francini company based on De Matteis' designs.
- Florence, Church of San Giuseppe, 1865–69. For this mortuary chapel, notes Pavan, De Matteis made six large windows with two figures in each, as well as two other circular windows depicting stories of saints.
- San Regolo, Ricasoli chapel in the Castello di Brolio, 1868–69. De Matteis created four large stained-glass windows as well as many windows with coats of arms, according to Pavan—all of which were commissioned by Bettino Ricasoli for the chapel of his castle.
- Florence, Church of Santa Croce, 1869. Pavan praises De Matteis for his completion of the three 14th-century stained-glass windows in the high altar chapel of Santa Croce—the lowest panels of these windows were missing. De Matteis' work was so successful, according to Pavan, that no one could tell where the medieval windows ended and the new ones began. And because of this work, De Matteis was made a Knight of the Crown of Italy. De Matteis went on to create two new windows for private chapels in the transept of Santa Croce: one commissioned by Francis Sloane, and one commissioned by the Guicciardini family. De Matteis was also commissioned by the architect Francesco Mazzei to create a circular window in the opening above the high altar chapel that was discovered during restorations in the 1860s; however, Francis Sloane, who was going to pay for the commission, died in 1871, and there was no funding for the completion of the project.
- Lucca, Church of San Michele in Foro, 1870. Pavan writes that De Matteis' success at Santa Croce earned him commissions to create windows for San Michele in Foro in Lucca and the Cathedral of Prato (see below). The 1906 De Matteis catalog lists the four nave windows with two Apostles in each, three apse windows, and two facade windows created by the firm for San Michele in Foro.

=== Gallery of work 1859-1870 ===
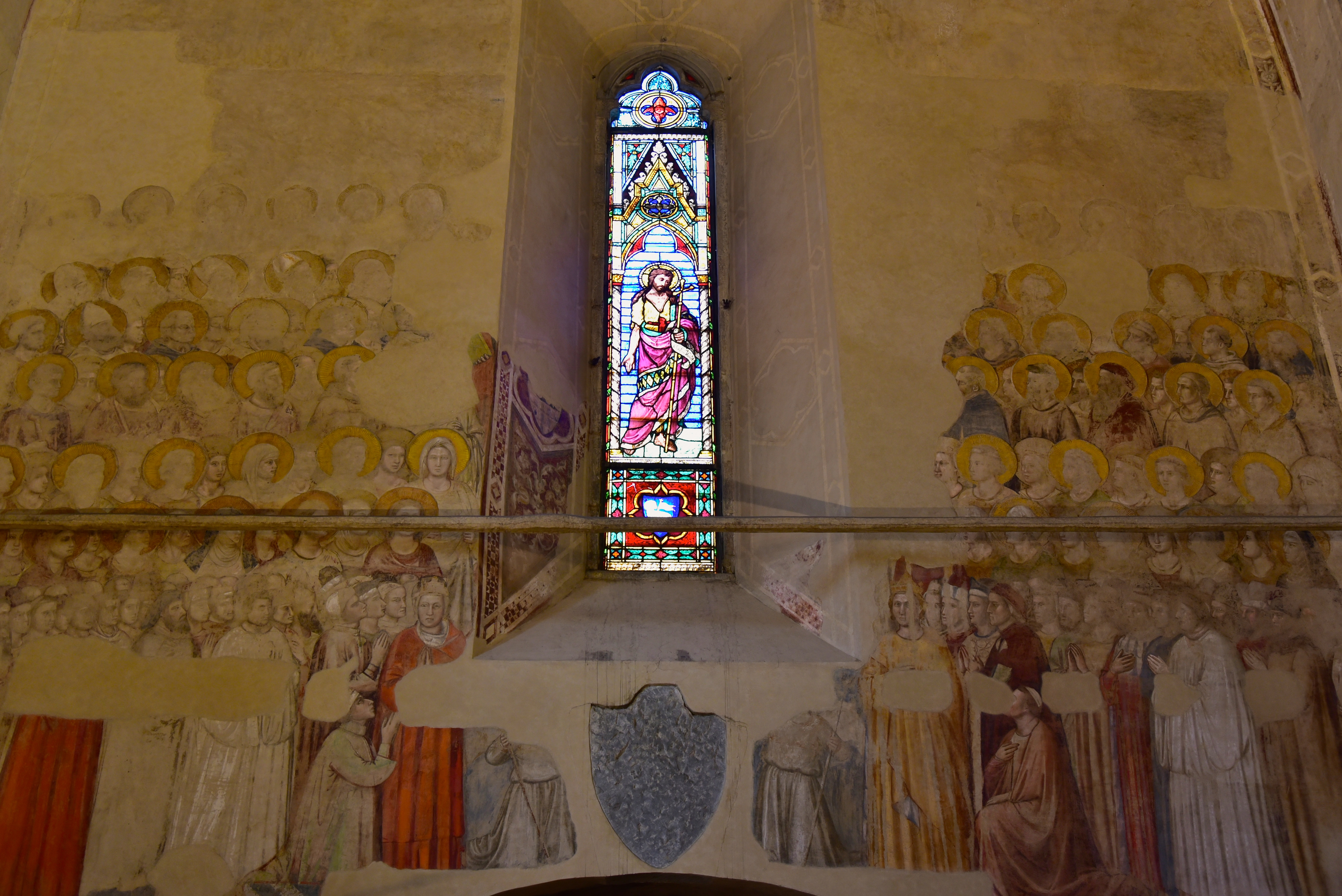
Ulisse De Matteis, Stained-glass window of St. John the Baptist, in the chapel of the Magdalene, Bargello, Florence, 1859.

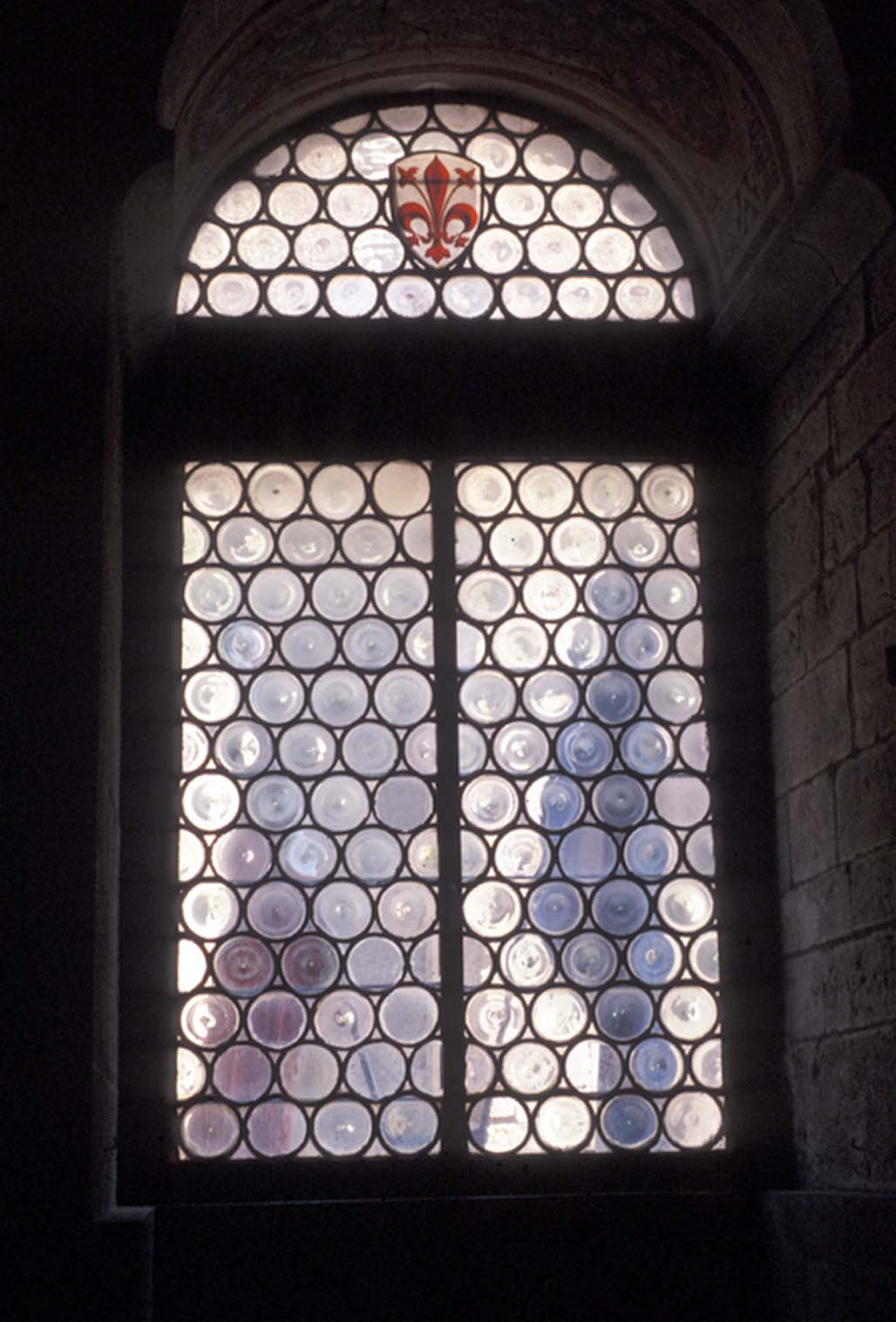
Ulisse De Matteis, crown-glass window with the Florence coat of arms, Bargello, Florence, 1859.

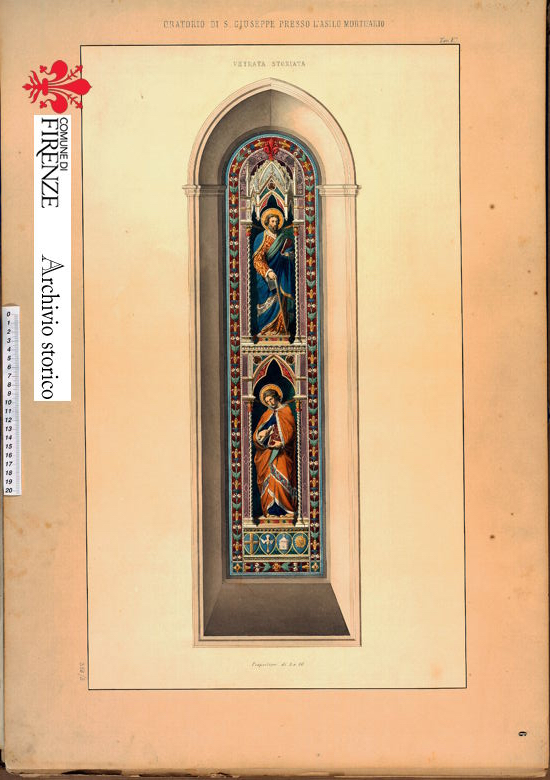
Watercolor drawing of a stained glass window created by Ulisse De Matteis ca. 1865 for the oratory of San Giuseppe in Florence. From the Archivio storico comunale Firenze.

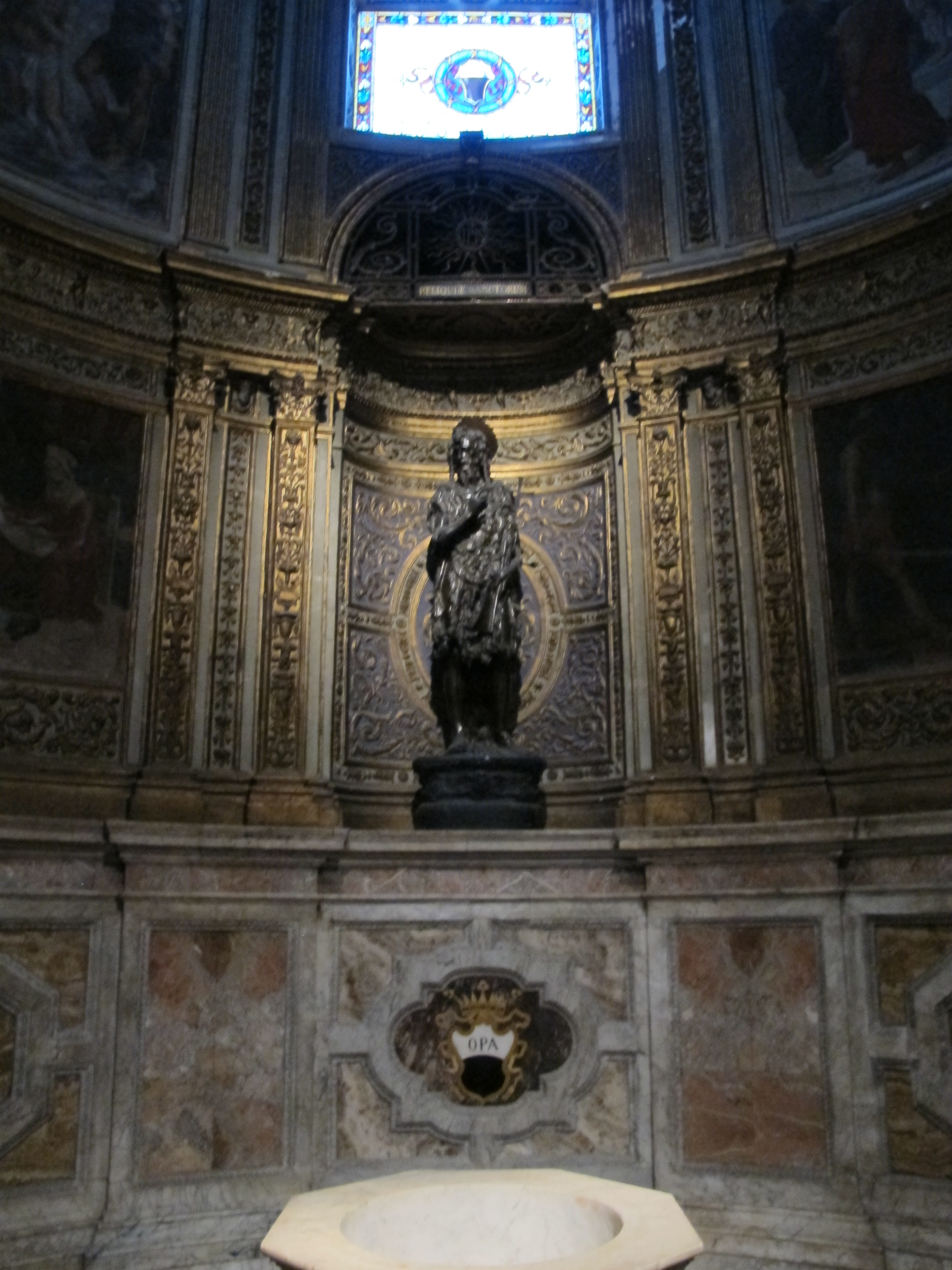
Ulisse De Matteis, stained-glass window in the chapel of St. John the Baptist in Siena Cathedral, 1865–66.

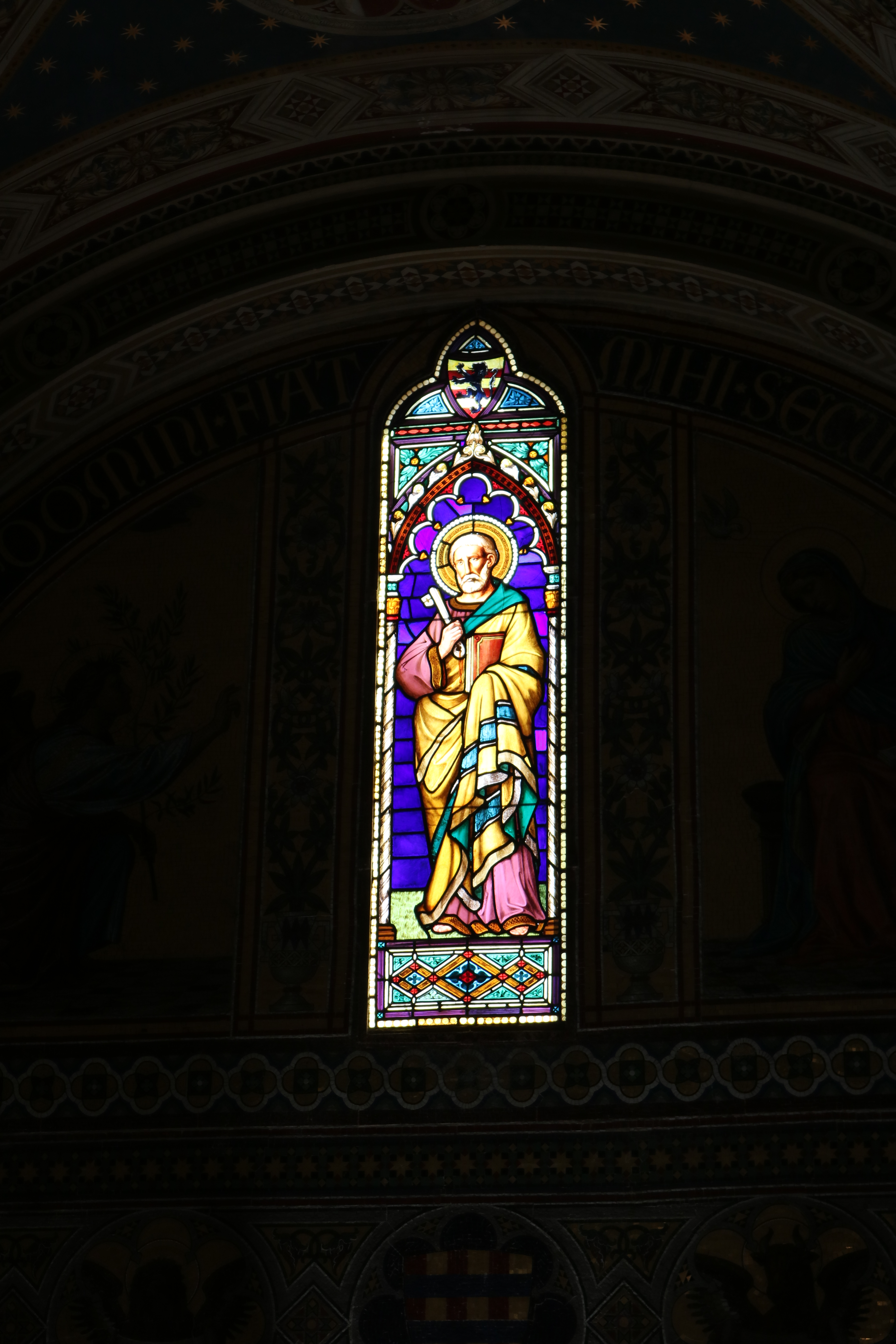
Ulisse De Matteis, Stained-glass window depicting St. Peter, from the Ricasoli Chapel at Castello di Brolio, 1868–69.

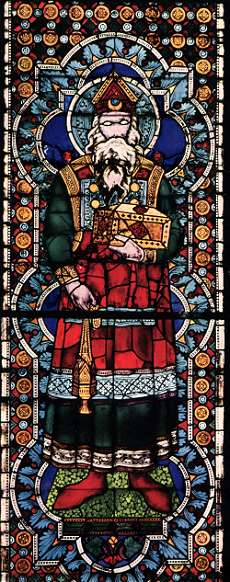
Fourteenth-century stained-glass window from the high altar chapel of Santa Croce, Florence. The part above the central iron bar is medieval; the part below the bar was created by Ulisse De Matteis in 1869.

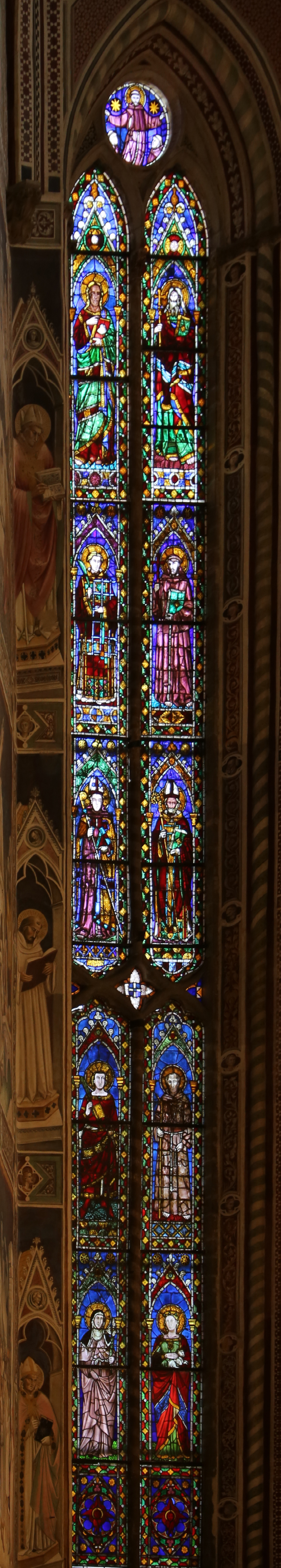
Fourteenth-century stained-glass window from the high altar chapel of Santa Croce, Florence. The lower halves of the female saints at the bottom of the window, as well as the two very lowest decorative panels containing red seraph heads, were created in 1869 by Ulisse De Matteis.

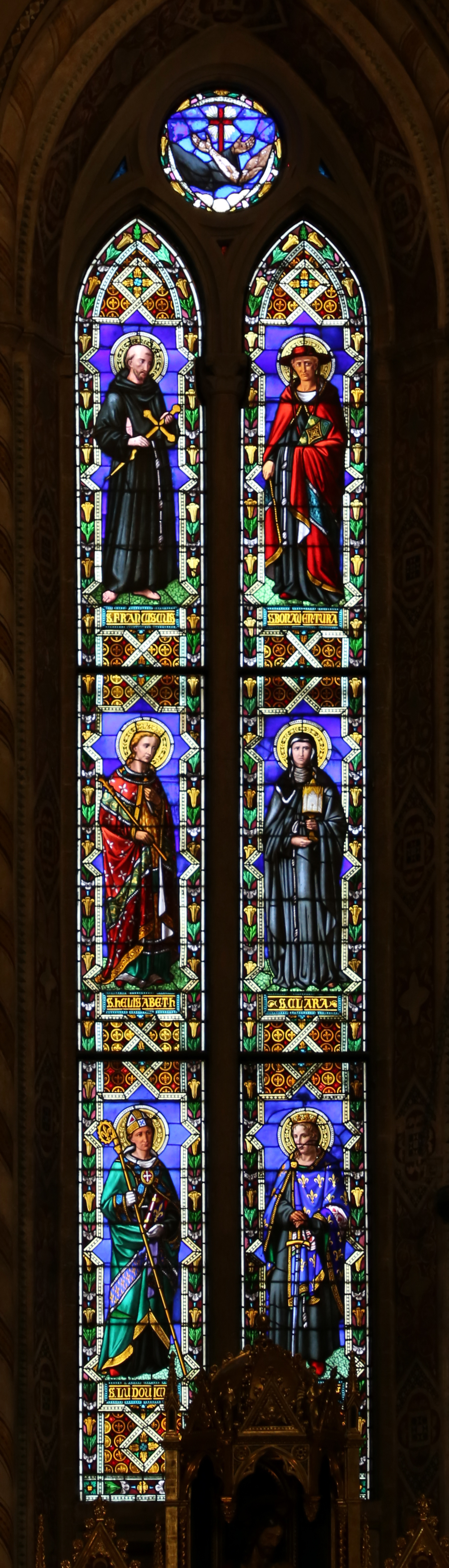
Ulisse De Matteis, Stained-glass window for the Guicciardini chapel, Santa Croce, Florence, 1869. The window bears the inscription: STA FRANCINI FIRENZE 1869 U. DE MATTEIS F*E. Ci N BRUSCHI.

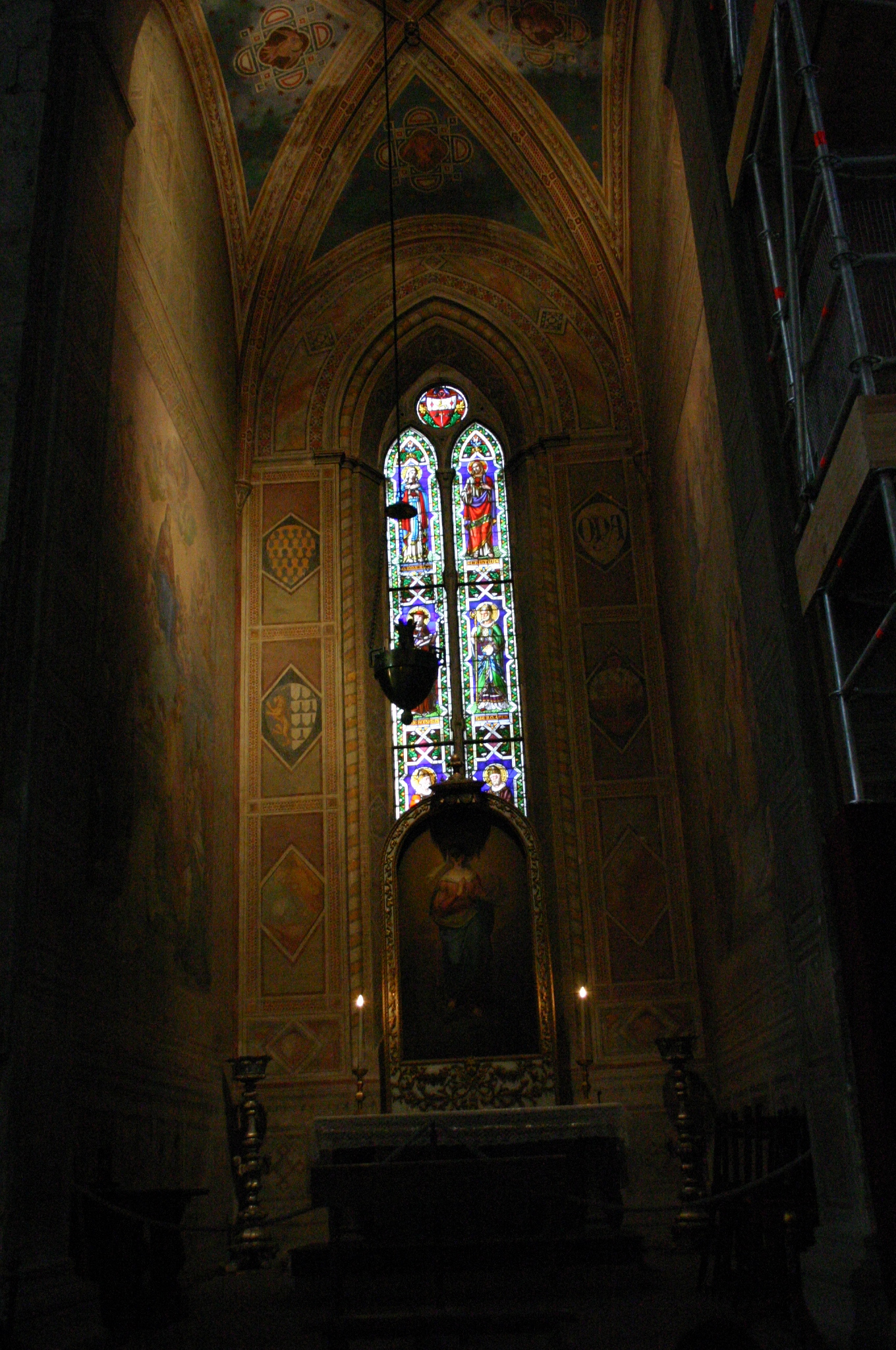
Ulisse De Matteis, Stained-glass window created for the Spinelli-Sloane chapel, Santa Croce, Florence, 1869.

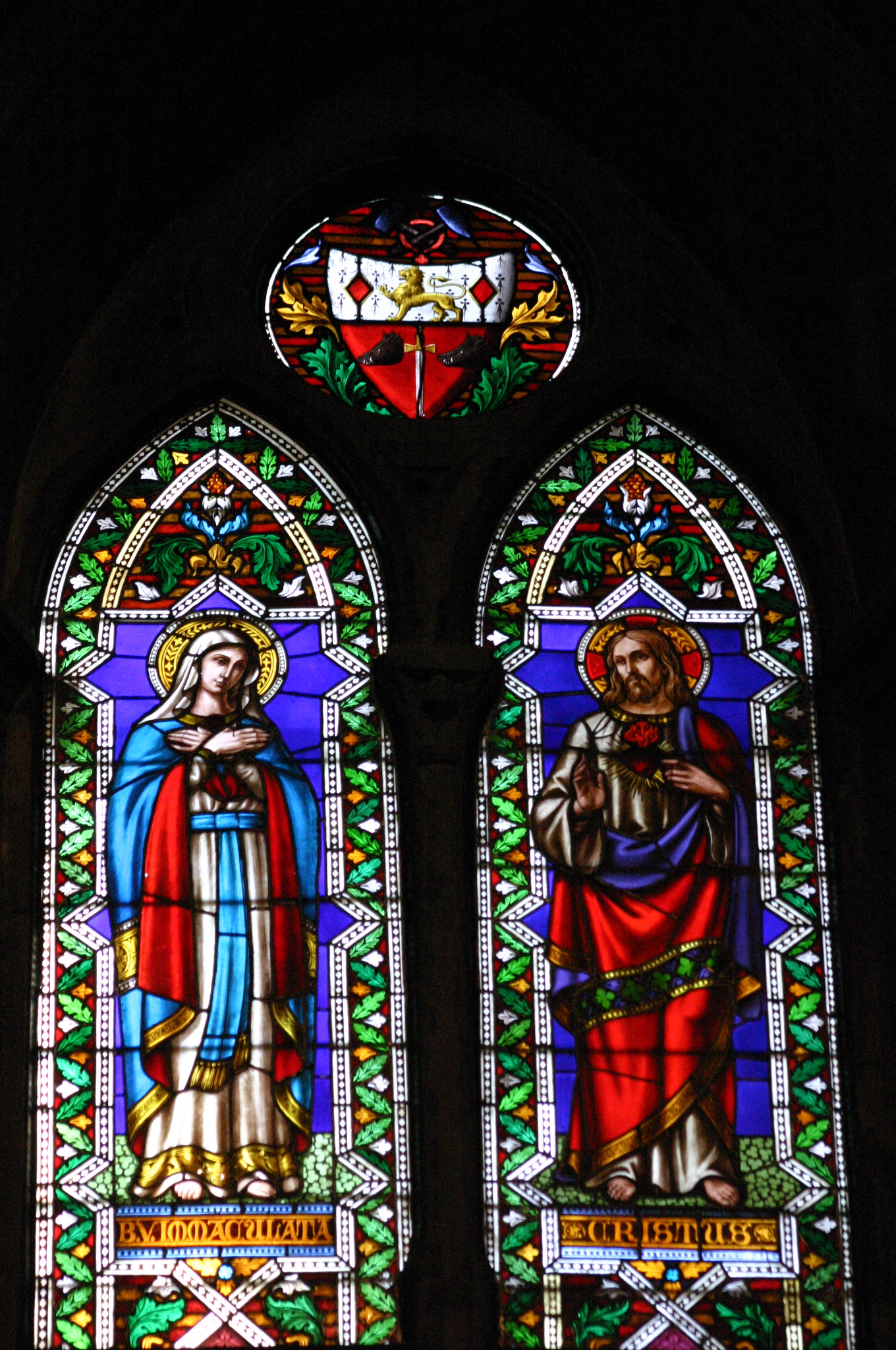
Ulisse De Matteis, detail of the Virgin Mary and Christ, from a stained-glass window dedicated to the Immaculate Conception in Spinelli-Sloane chapel, Santa Croce, Florence, 1869.

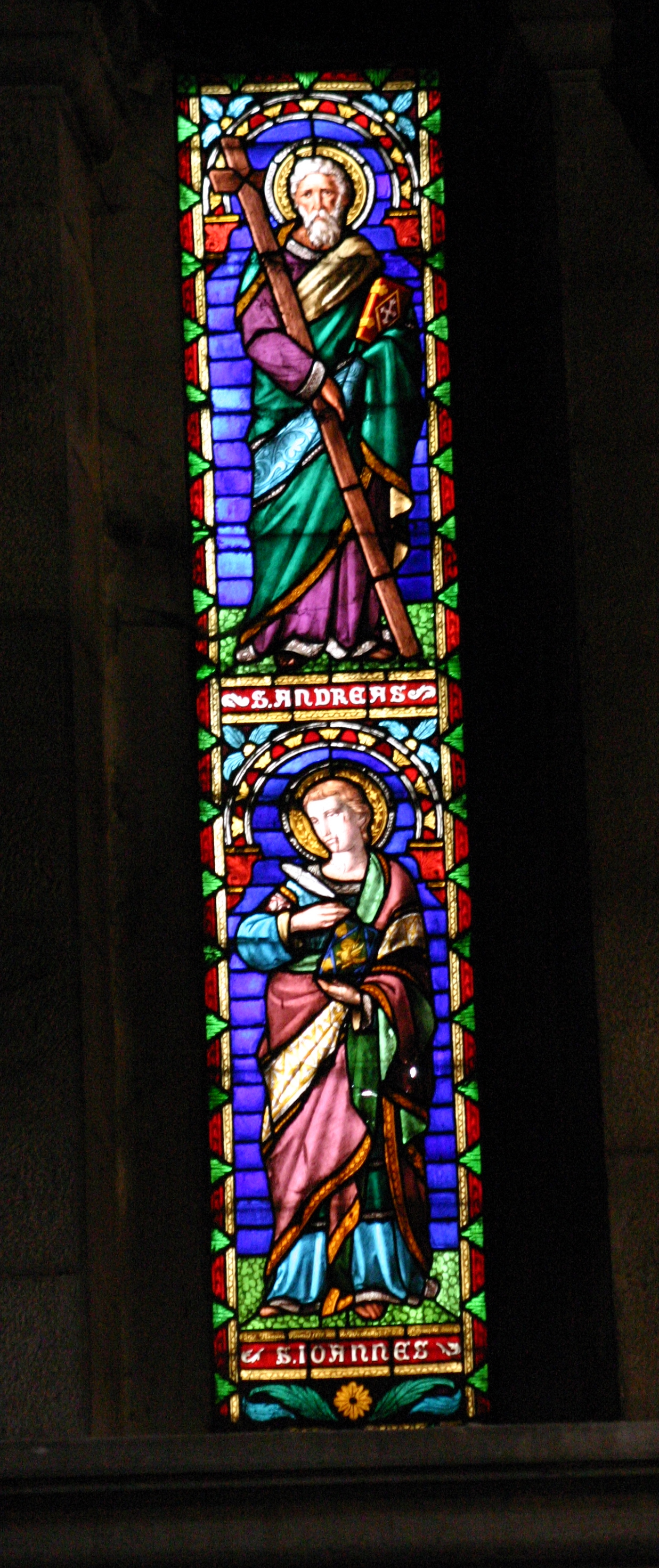
Ulisse De Matteis, Stained-glass window of saints Andrew and John, Lucca, San Michele in Foro. 1870. The inscription under St. John reads: Sta Francini Firenze 1870 U De Matteis N Bruschi.

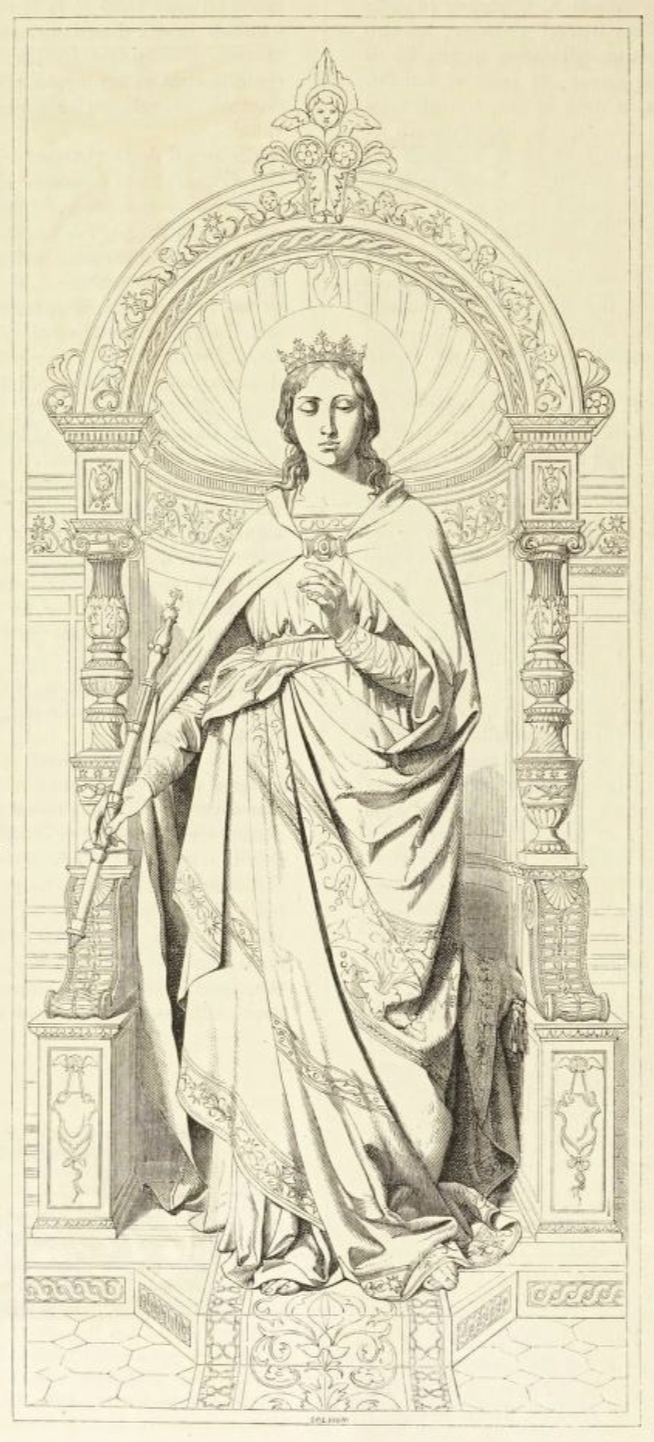
An engraving of the stained glass window that Ulisse De Matteis entered in the Roman exhibit of Catholic art in 1870. Included in: Antonio Pavan, "Della pittura su vetro e del laboratorio De Matteis," L'arte in Italia III (1870): 68–69.

== Commissions, 1870-1879 ==
- Genoa, Rubattino-Rebizzo chapel in the Cemetery of Staglieno, 1871. When Bianca Rebizzo died in 1869, Raffaele Rubattini erected a chapel in her memory. The painter Nicolò Barabino frescoed the interior, and Ulisse De Matteis created stained-glass windows for the upper parts of the chapel based on drawings by Barabino.
- Florence, San Michele Visdomini, 1872. Receipts in the archive of the church indicate that De Matteis created four large windows containing busts of Christ the Redeemer (S.S. Redentore), St. Joseph (S. Giuseppe), St. Michael (S. Michele), and St. John (S. Giovanni). The bill that the firm sent to the church attests that all of the painting was created with enamels by the artist Ulisse De Matteis, and that the leading of the windows was done according to the style of craftsmanship from the 1500s. The windows are in the nave of the church; two are visible in the top corners of this photograph.
- Florence, Certosa del Galluzzo, Church of San Lorenzo, ca. 1870–80. The De Matteis catalog from 1906 lists a large circular window with a figure of Christ the Redeemer and a figural window for a side chapel, commissioned by the Certosini. The specific date of the windows is uncertain; however, the window of Christ the Redeemer is visible in a photograph of the choir stalls in the church taken by Giacomo Brogi (Edizioni Brogi 4348) ca. 1870–80.
- Prato, Church of San Domenico, 1872. Restorations to the church began in the 1860s. One of the last campaigns in 1872 involved opening up the large, pointed arch on the wall behind the choir. De Matteis created a large window depicting the Assumption of the Virgin with St. Francis and St. Dominic to fit into this newly opened space.
- Prato, Cathedral, 1870–74. When Antonio Pavan was writing in 1870, De Matteis had just been commissioned to create windows for Prato Cathedral, many based on drawings by Pietro Pezzati. De Matteis created a window in the chapel of the Angioli Custodi (Guardian Angels), a window for the St. Lawrence chapel, a window of the Resurrection of Christ in the Vinaccessi Chapel, which is signed and dated, as well as windows in the transepts depicting a variety of saints. De Matteis also restored the windows in the high altar chapel.
- Siena, Oratory of the Kitchen, House of St. Catherine, 1874. De Matteis created the two windows on either side of the high altar. Marchese Pieri Nerli Ferdinando paid for the window.
- Florence, Palazzo Medici, Magi chapel, 1875–76. De Matteis was commissioned to create a stained-glass window for the chapel as part of a restoration campaign. The window contained decorative elements that were taken from the chapel itself. The window was removed when the chapel was once again restored in 1911. See a photo of the chapel before this restoration in the Alinari collection.
- Florence, Laurentian Library, 1876. De Matteis created a window in the same style as those painted by Giovanni da Udine in the 16th century for the library reading room. The De Matteis window is inscribed: Sta^{o}: Francini U De Matteis N. Bruschi U De Matteis Firenze 1876.
- Genoa, Cathedral of San Lorenzo, 1876. All of the historiated stained-glass windows in the chapel of St. John the Baptist. The windows in the lower level depict: Abraham, Moses, David, Daniel, Joseph, Joachim, Anna, and Simeon. The windows in the dome depict angels and Christ. All of the windows have been restored several times, most notably after the cathedral was damaged by a bomb in World War II.
- Fiesole, Castle of Vincigliata, 1875–80. De Matteis created several windows for the castle while it was being restored by John Temple Leader. None of the windows survives, however, because the castle was used to house prisoners of war during WWII and was ransacked at the end of the war. A photograph of the window De Matteis created for the chapel at Vincigliata, which contained four 16th-century glass roundels surrounded by grotteschi and other motifs painted by De Matteis, is in the Fratelli Alinari photo archive: https://www.alinari.it/item/en/1/595890. As Francesco Baldry notes, this window resembles those in the Laurentian library, where De Matteis was working at the same time he was working at Vincigliata.

=== Gallery of Work 1870-1879 ===
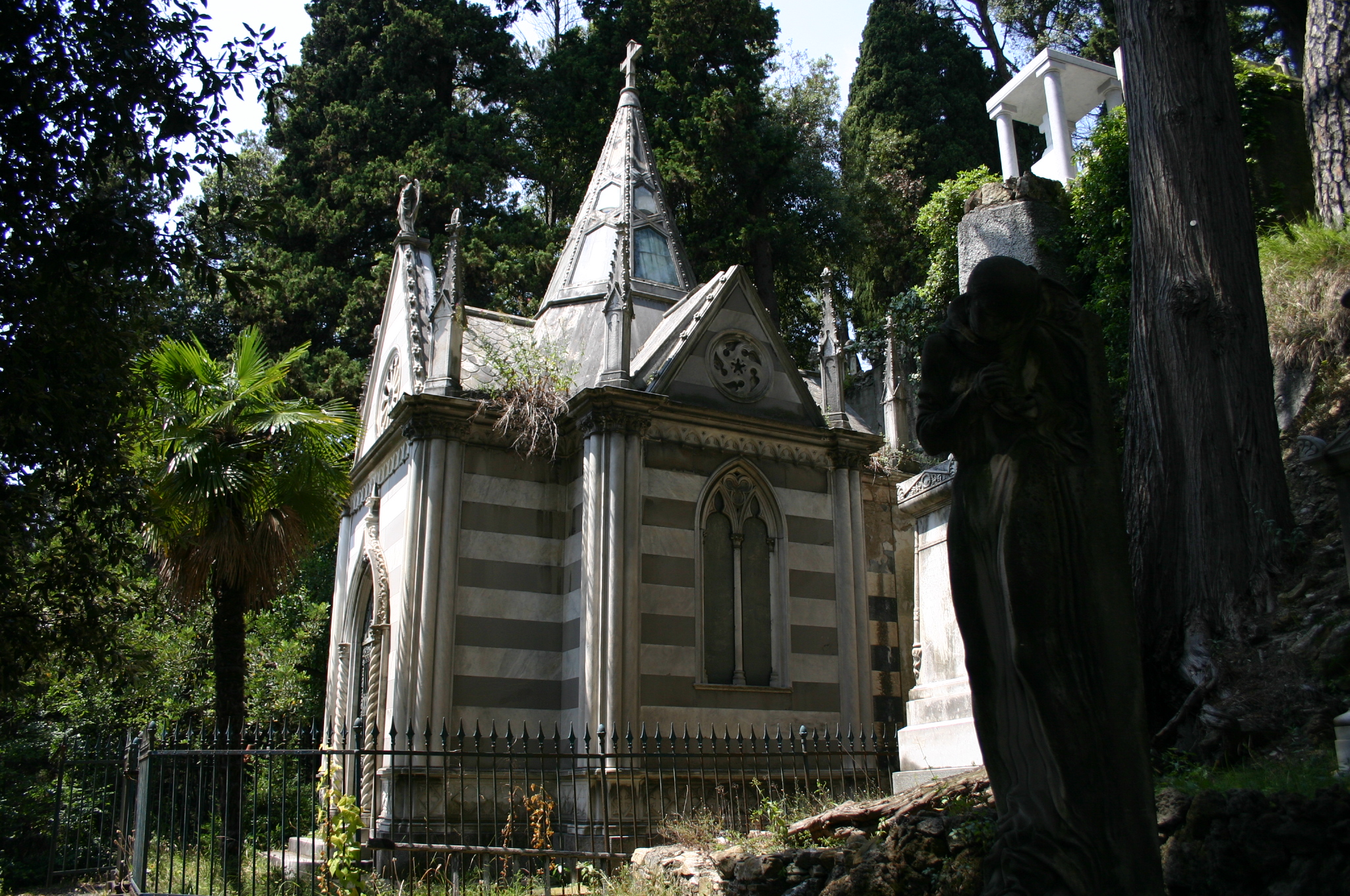
G.B. Resasco (architect), Rubattino-Rebizzo chapel, Staglieno Cemetery, Genoa, 1870. The chapel spire contains stained-glass windows by Ulisse De Matteis.

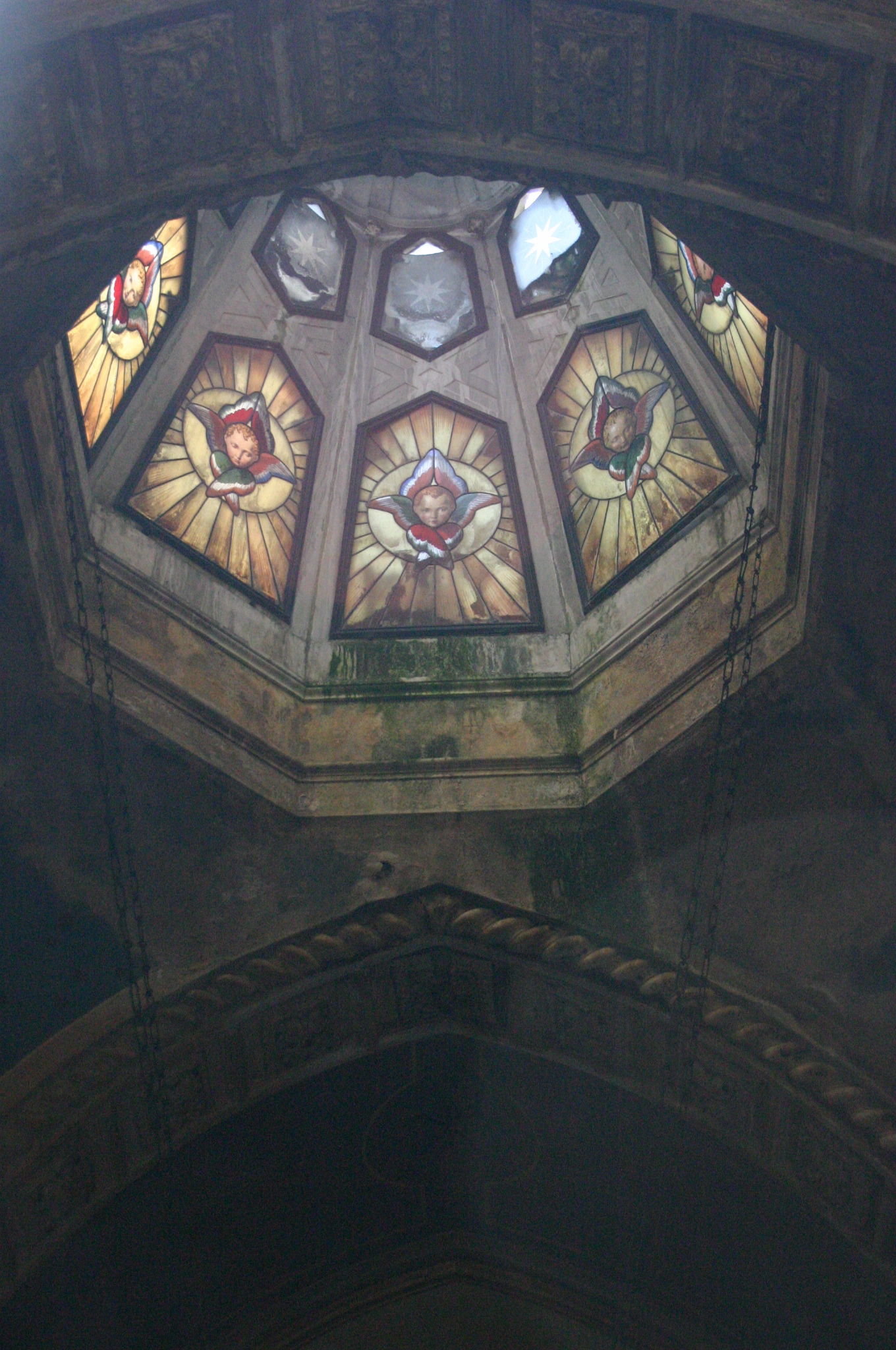
Ulisse De Matteis, stained-glass windows in the spire of the Rubattino-Rebizzo chapel, Staglieno Cemetery, Genoa, 1871.

G.B. Resasco (architect), Rubattino-Rebisso chapel, Staglieno Cemetery, Genoa, 1870. The spire contains stained-glass windows created by De Matteis in 1871.

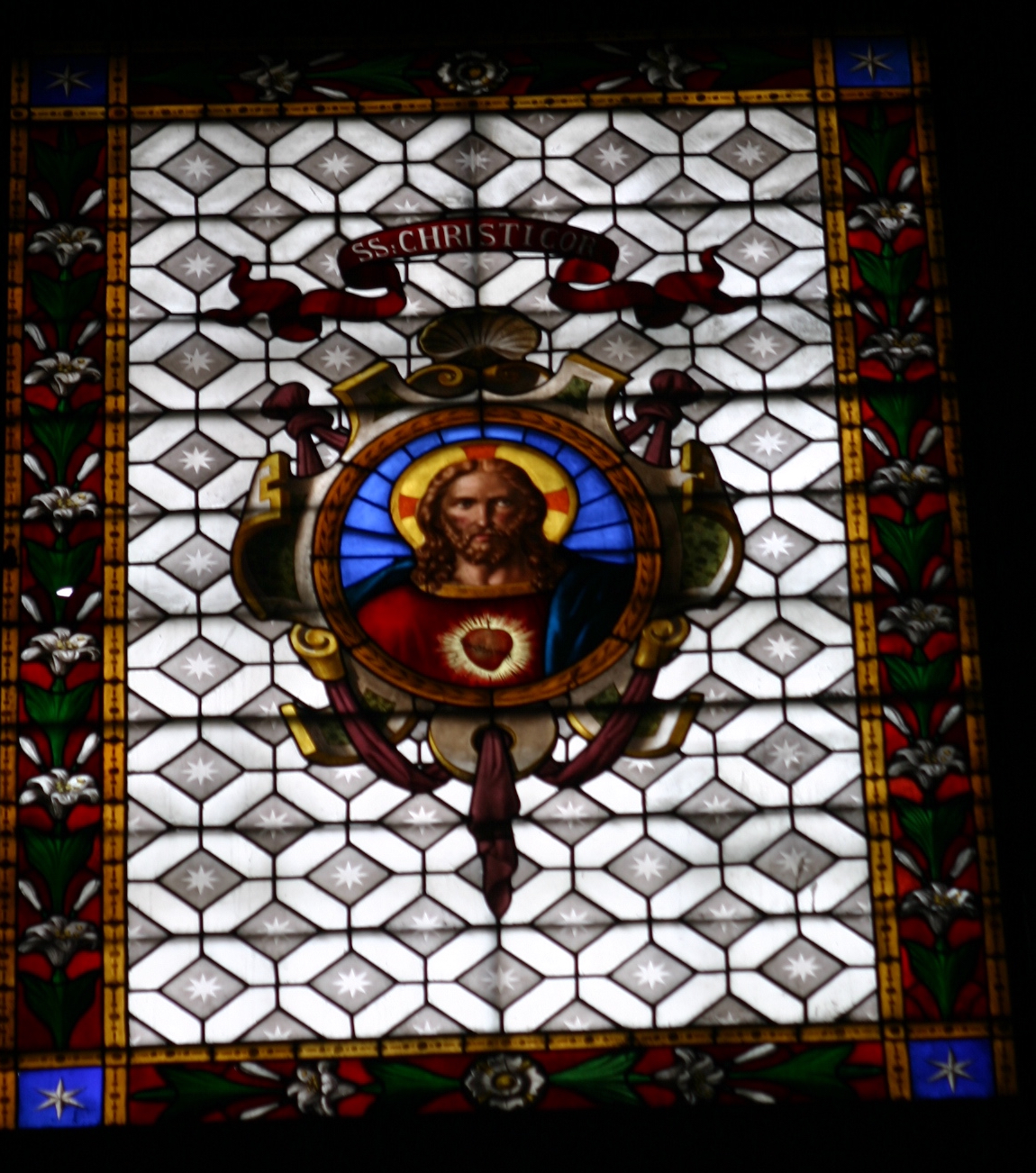
Ulisse De Matteis, Stained-glass window depicting Christ (S.S. Redentore), Church of San Michele Visdomini, Florence, 1872.

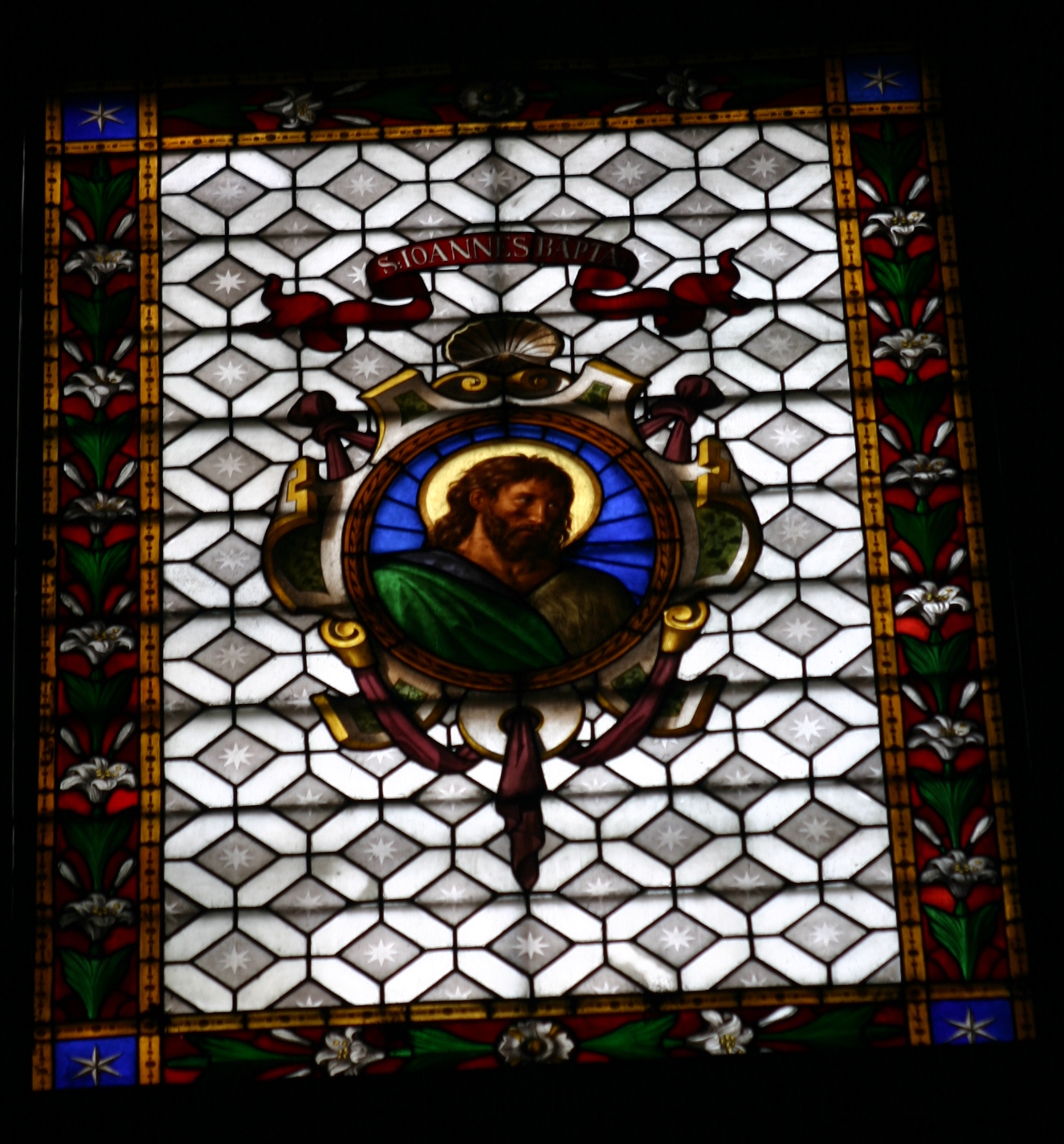
Ulisse De Matteis, Stained-glass window depicting St. John (S. Giovanni), Church of San Michele Visdomini, Florence, 1872.

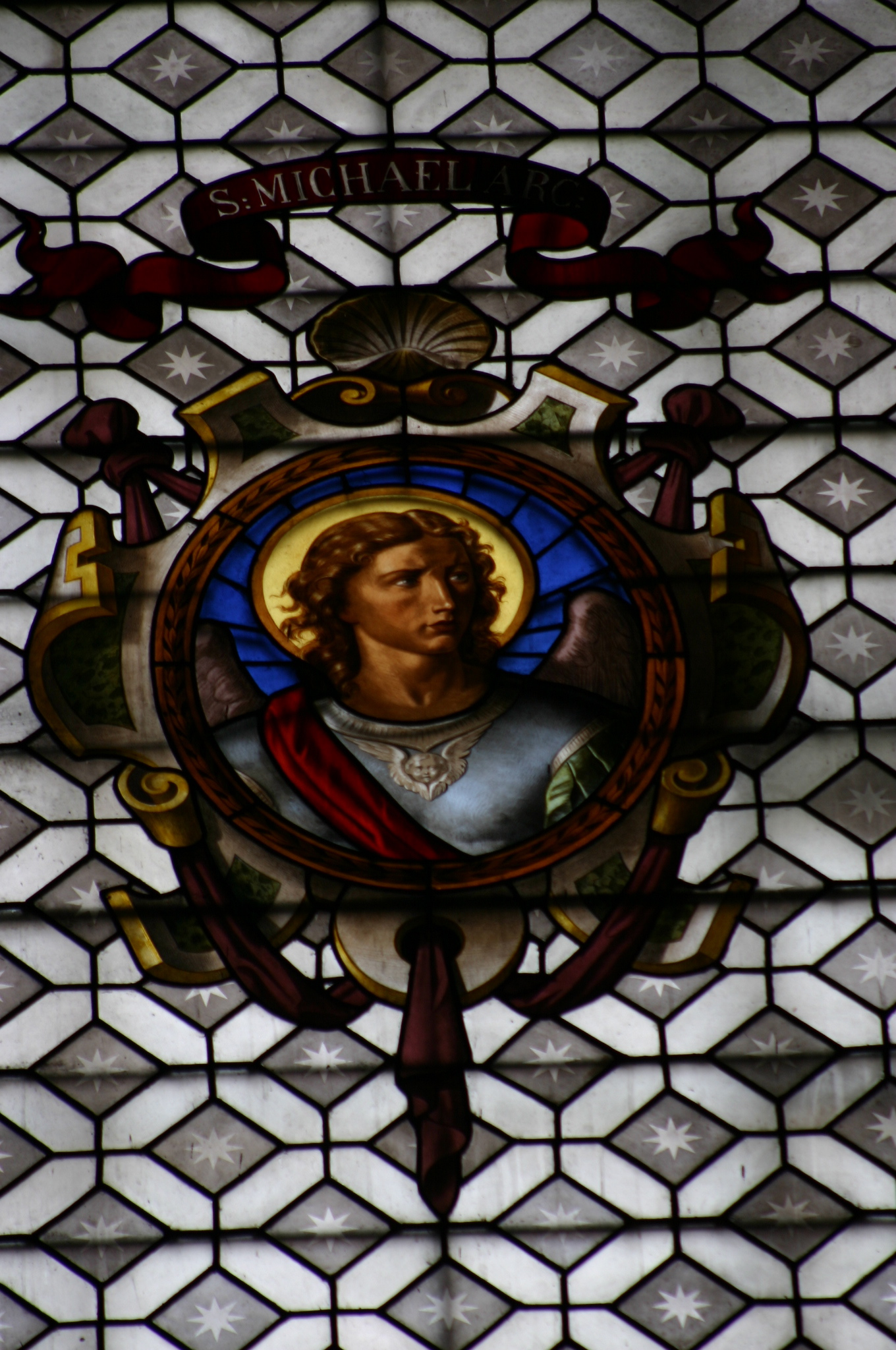
Ulisse De Matteis, detail of stained-glass window depicting St. Michael (S. Michele), Church of San Michele Visdomini, Florence, 1872.

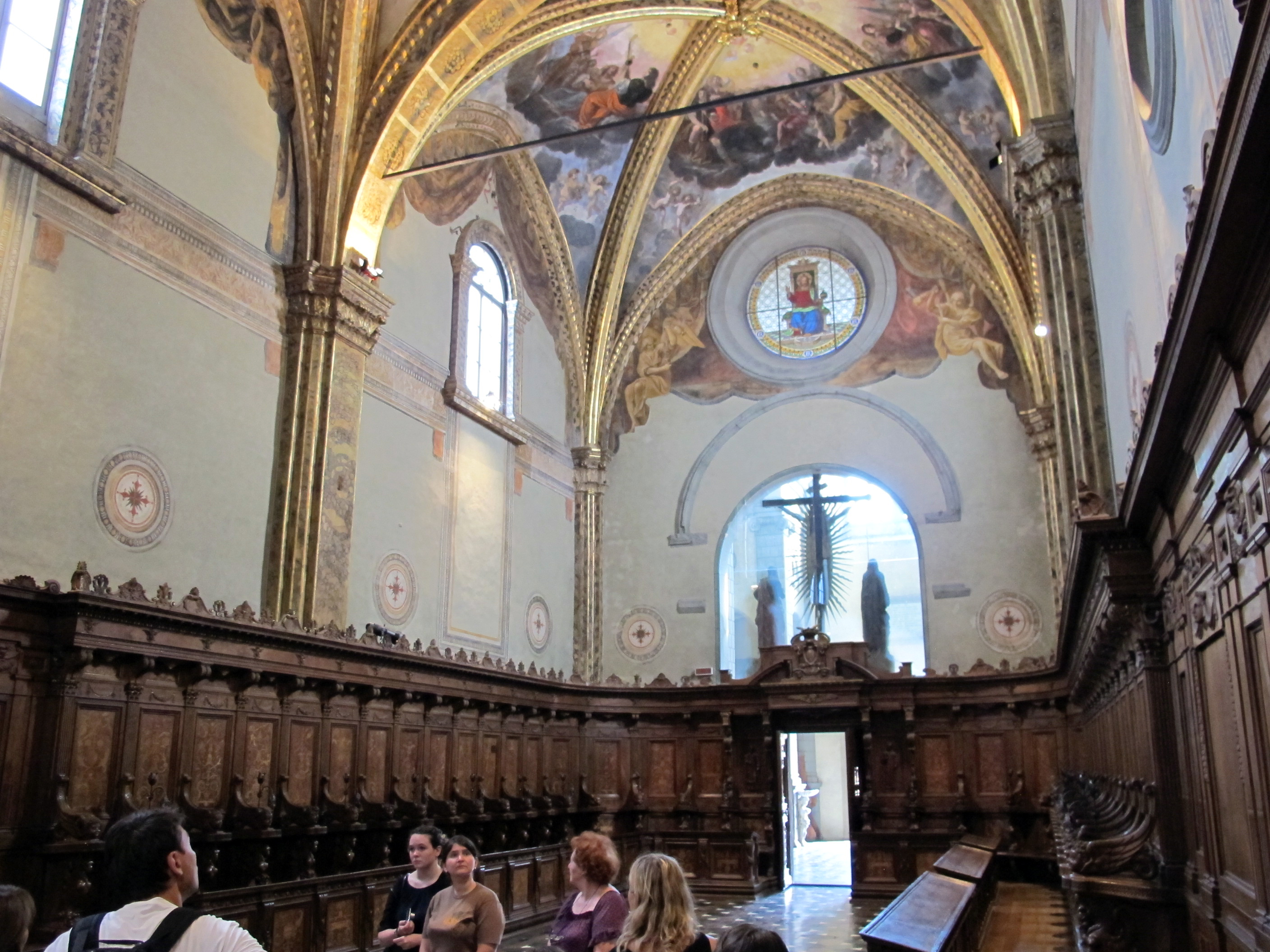
Interior of the church of San Lorenzo in the Certosa del Galluzzo near Florence. The window of Christ the Redeemer was made by Ulisse De Matteis ca. 1870–80.

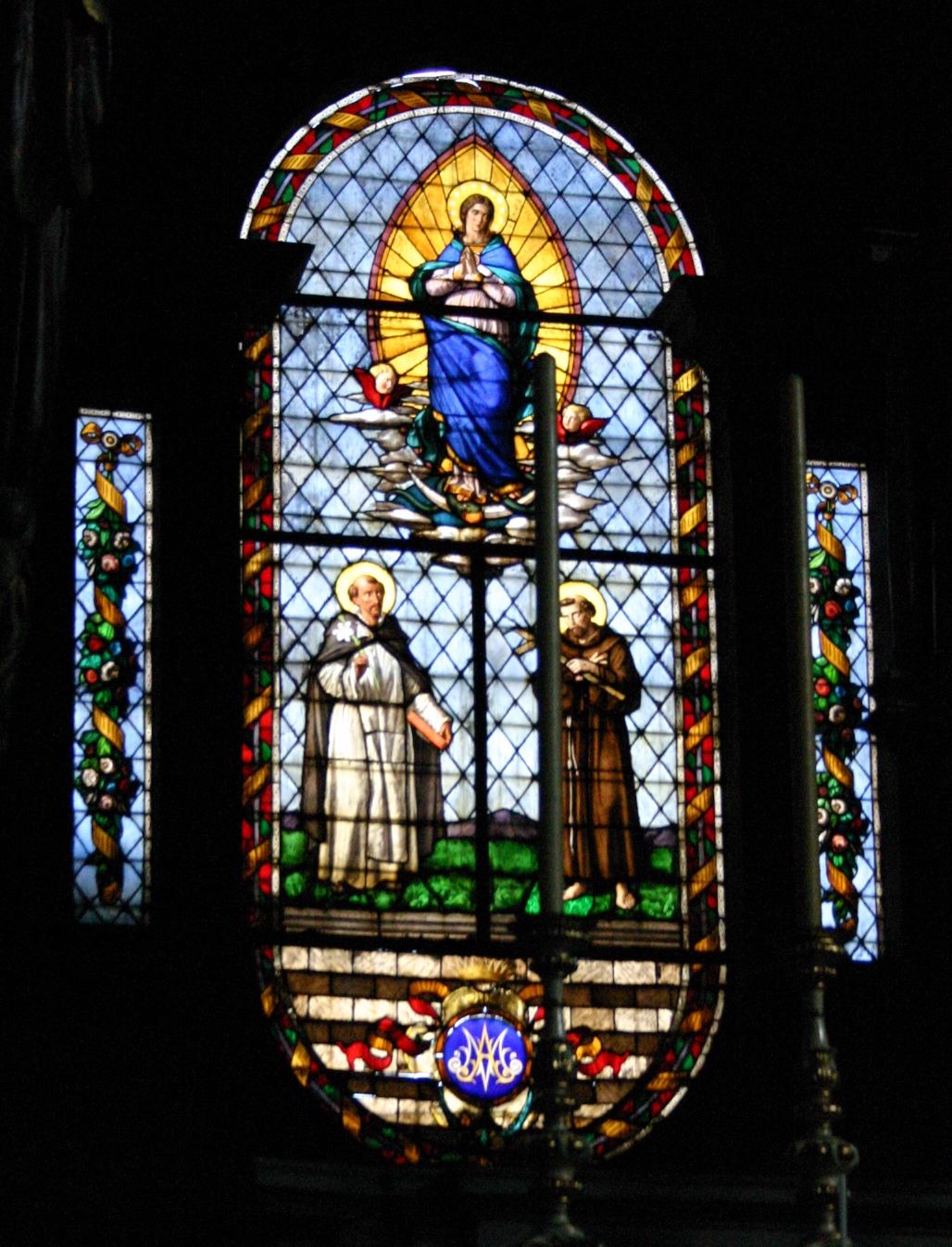
Ulisse De Matteis, Stained-glass window of the Assumption of the Virgin with Saints Dominic and Francis. Church of San Domenico, Prato. 1872.

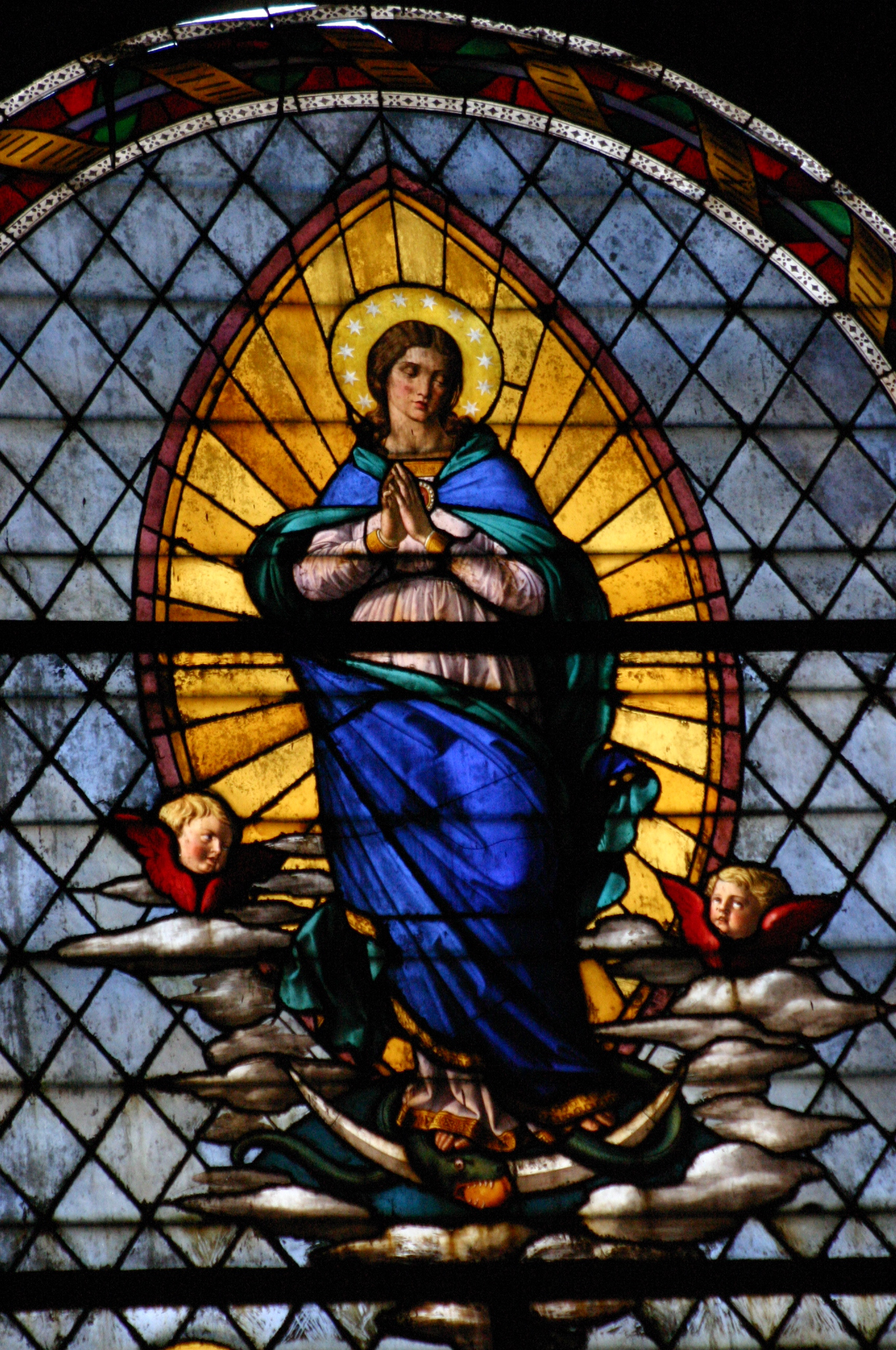
Ulisse De Matteis, Detail of a stained-glass window of the Assumption of the Virgin with Saints Dominic and Francis. Church of San Domenico, Prato. 1872.

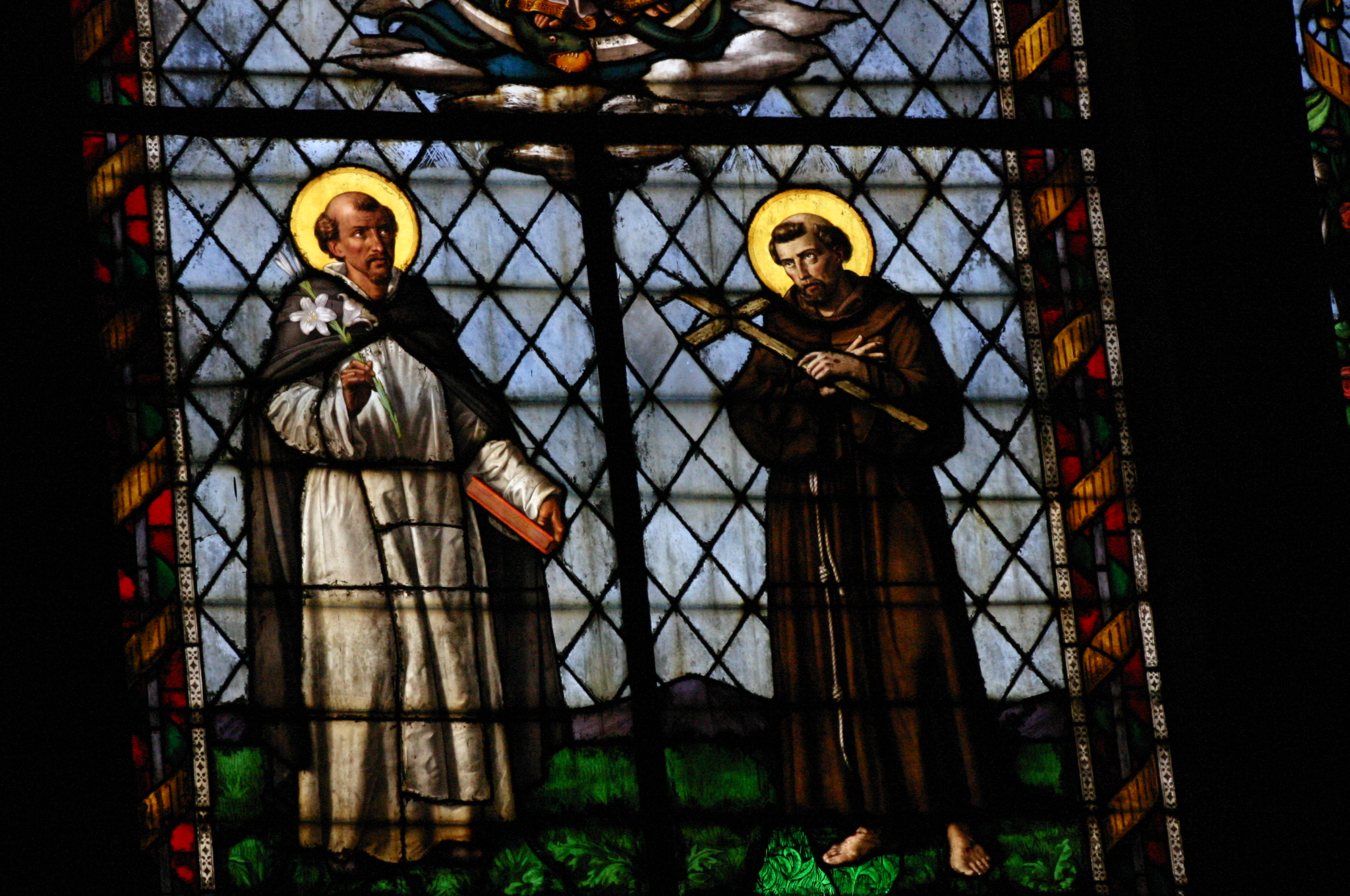
Ulisse De Matteis, Detail of a stained-glass window of the Assumption of the Virgin with Saints Dominic and Francis. Church of San Domenico, Prato. 1872.

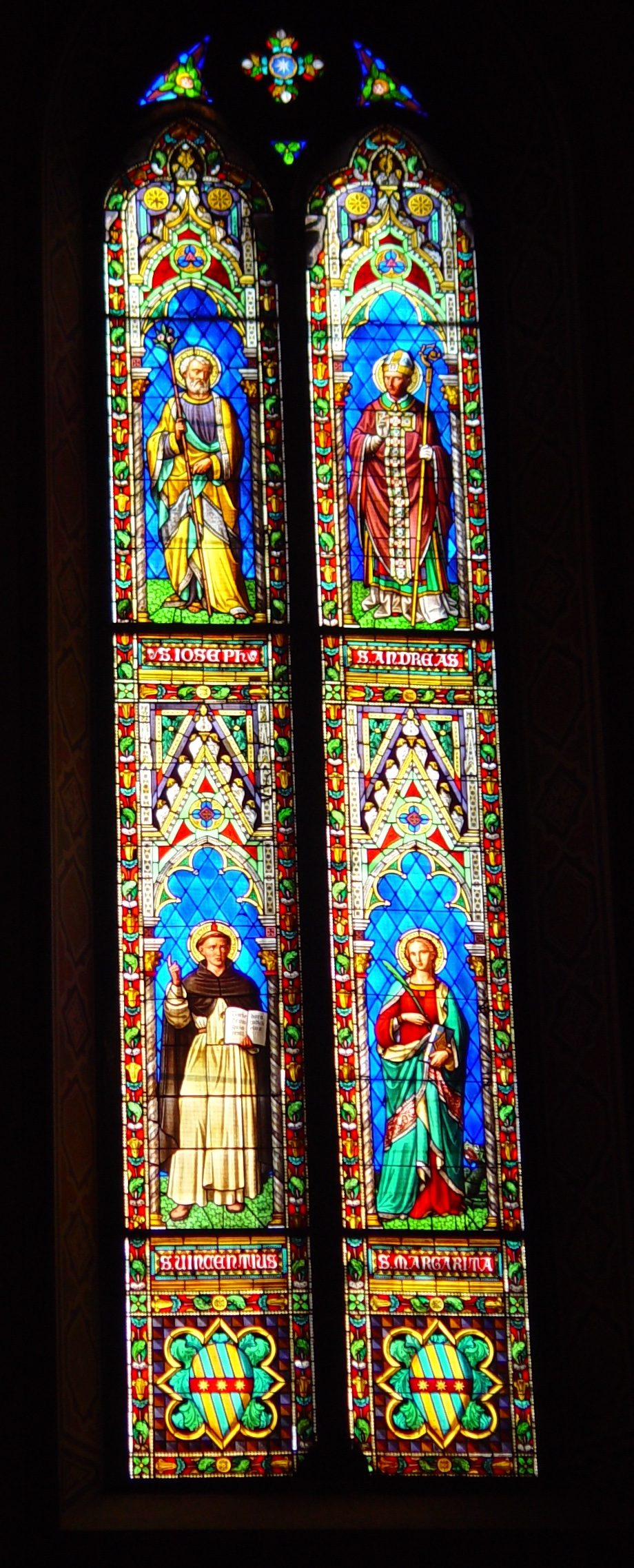
Ulisse De Matteis, stained-glass window depicting saints Joseph, Andrew, Vincent, and Margarita, transept of Prato Cathedral, 1870–71.

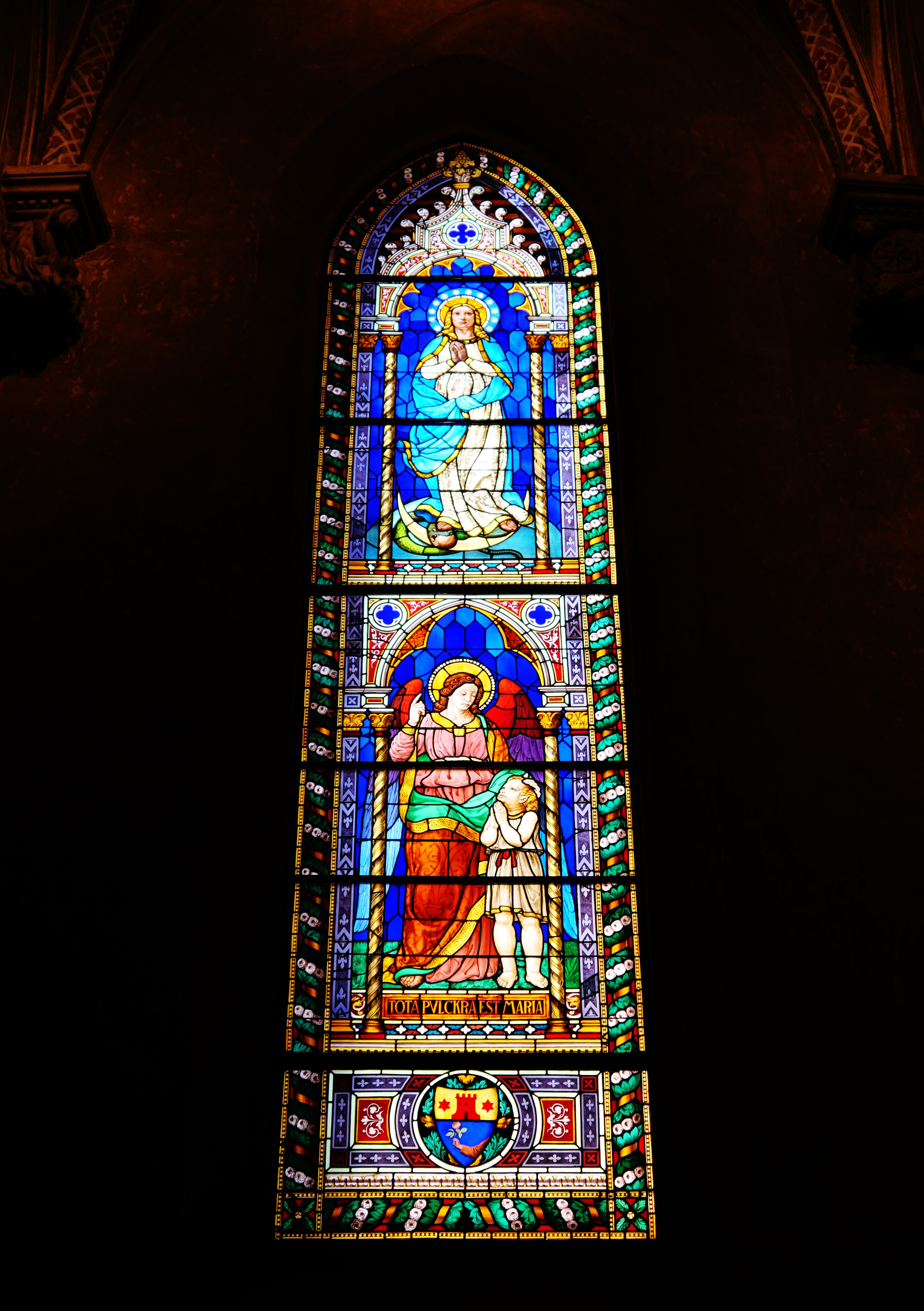
Ulisse De Matteis, Stained-glass window depicting the Assumption of the Virgin and a Guardian Angel, Prato Cathedral, chapel of the Guardian Angels/Assumption, 1871.

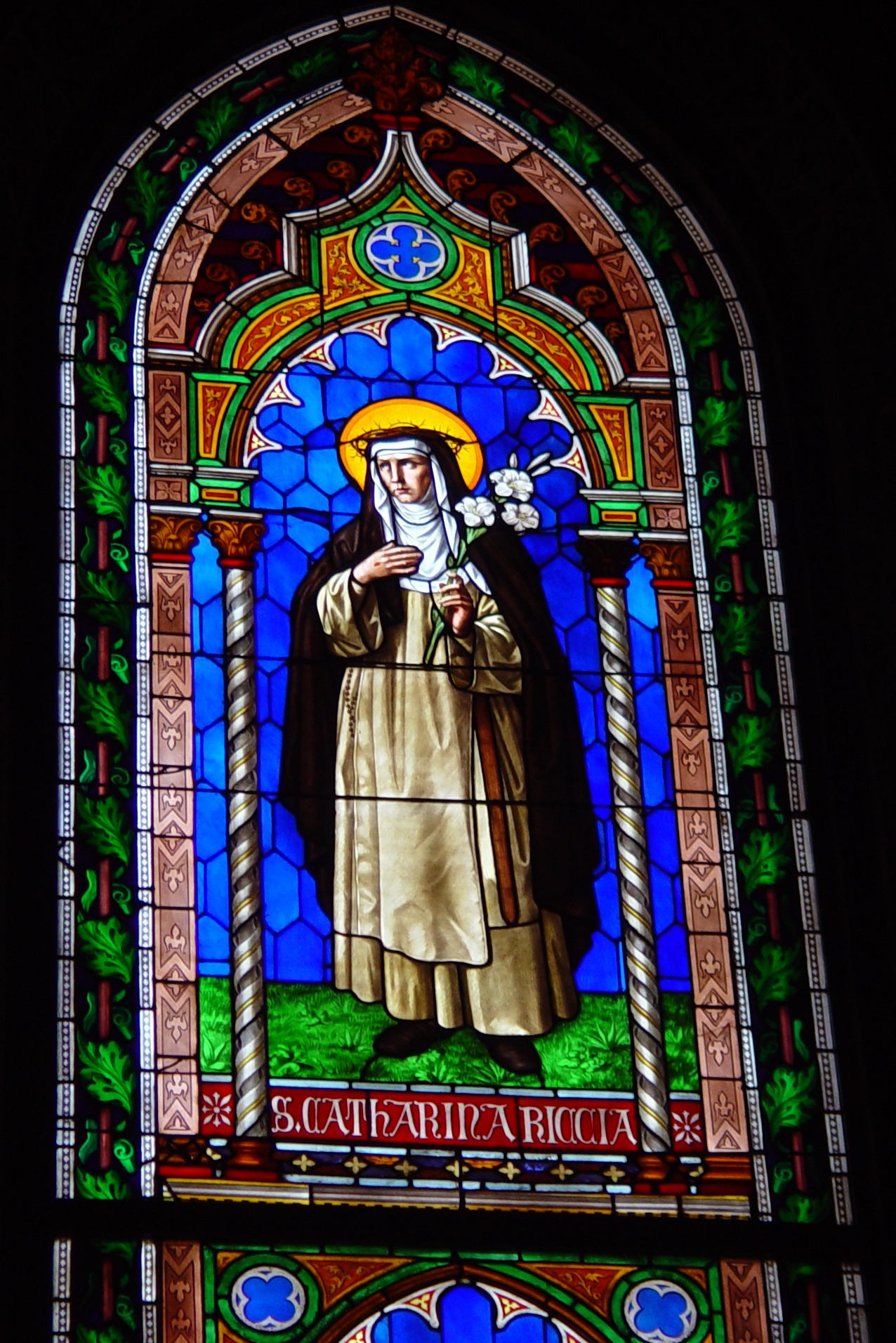
Ulisse De Matteis, Detail of the stained-glass window in the Manassei Chapel showing St. Caterina Riccia, Prato Cathedral, 1872.

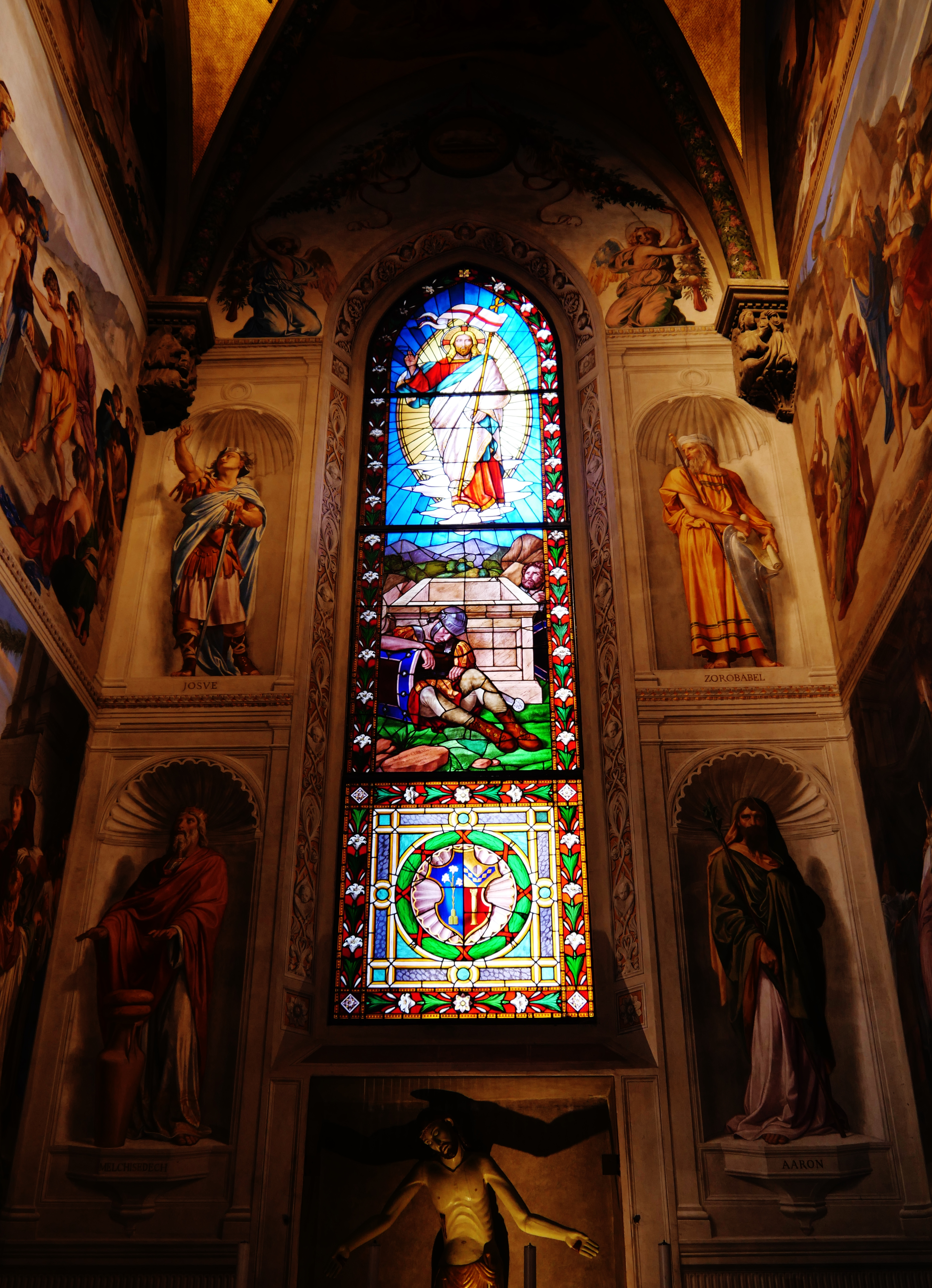
Ulisse De Matteis, Stained-glass window of the Resurrection of Christ, Prato Cathedral, Vinaccesi chapel, 1874.

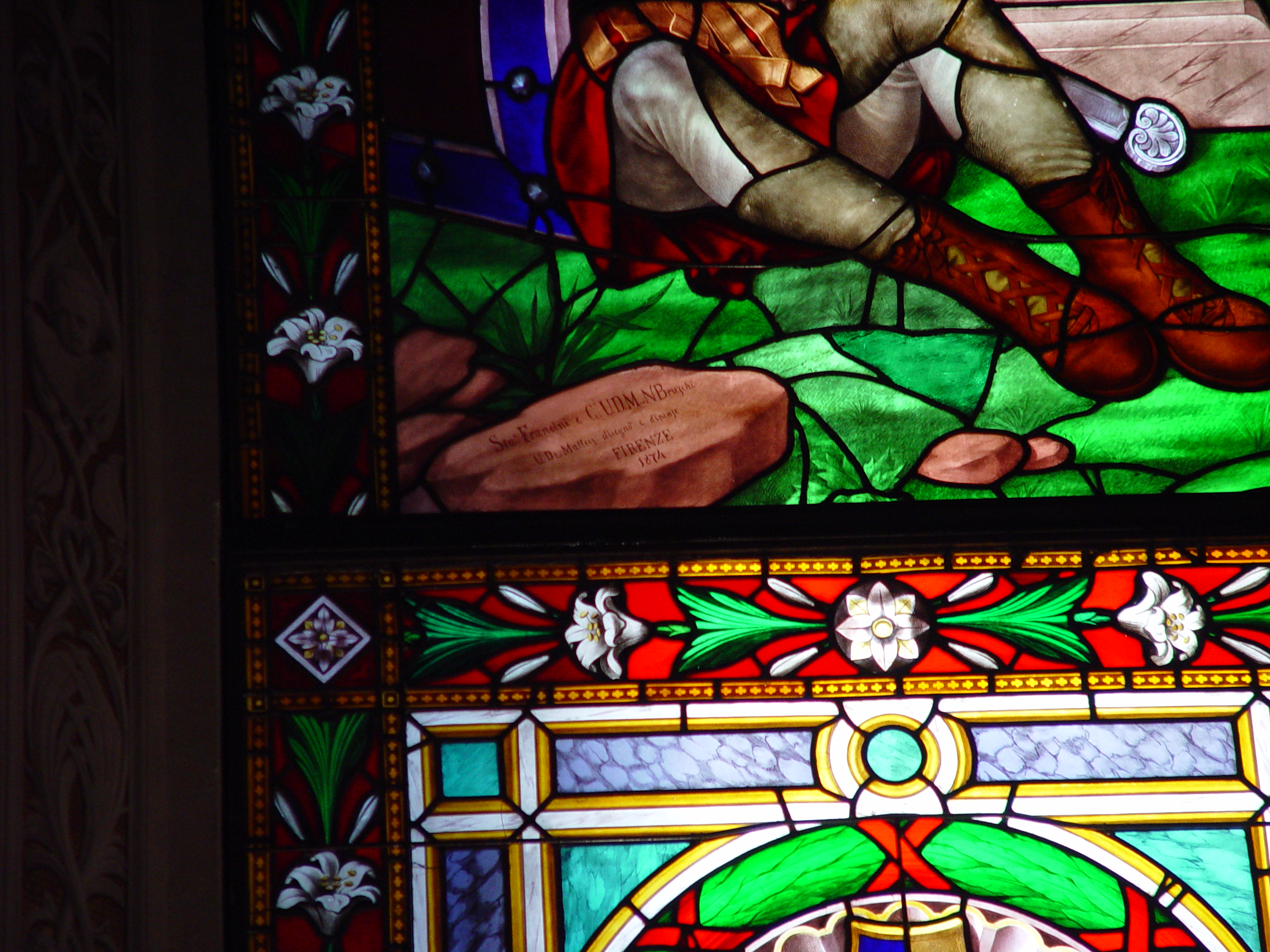
Ulisse De Matteis, detail of a stained-glass window depicting the Resurrection of Christ created for the Vinaccessi Chapel in the Cathedral of Prato, 1874. The inscription on the rock reads: Sta Francini e Co. U.D.M. N. Bruschi | U. De Matteis disegnò e dipinse | FIRENZE 1874.

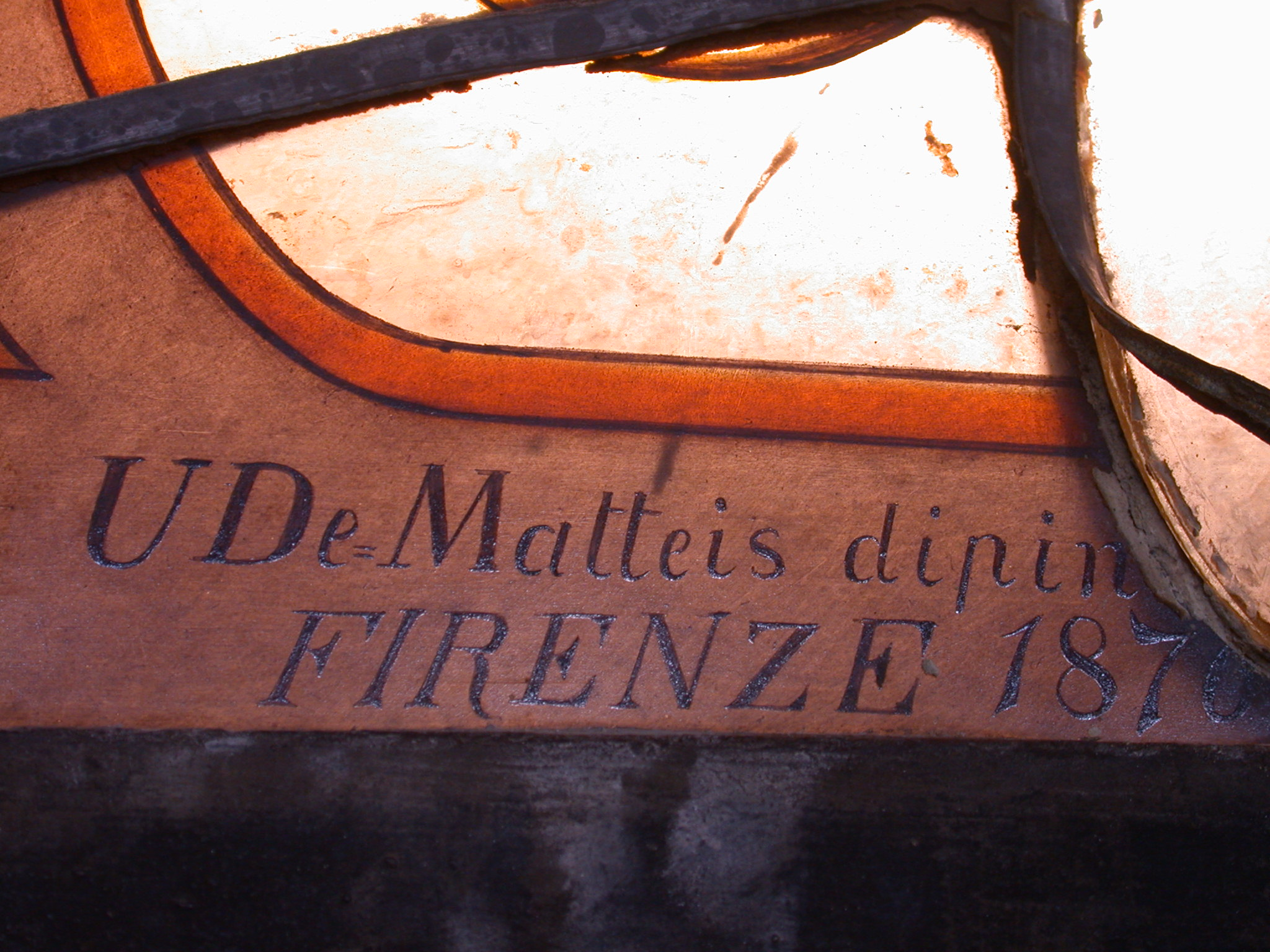
Ulisse De Matteis, inscription on a window in the Laurentian library, 1876.

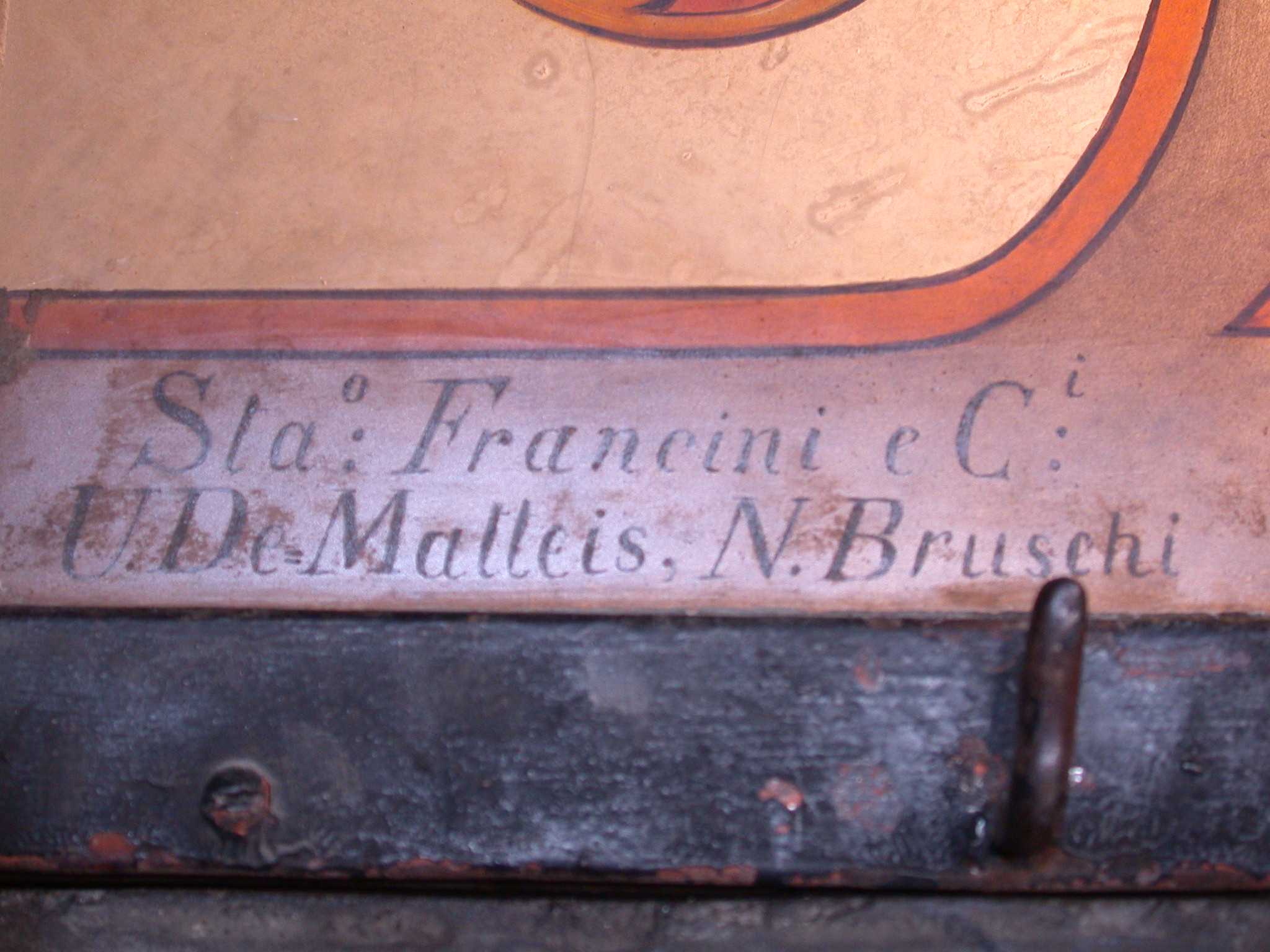
Ulisse De Matteis, inscription on a window in the Laurentian library, 1876.

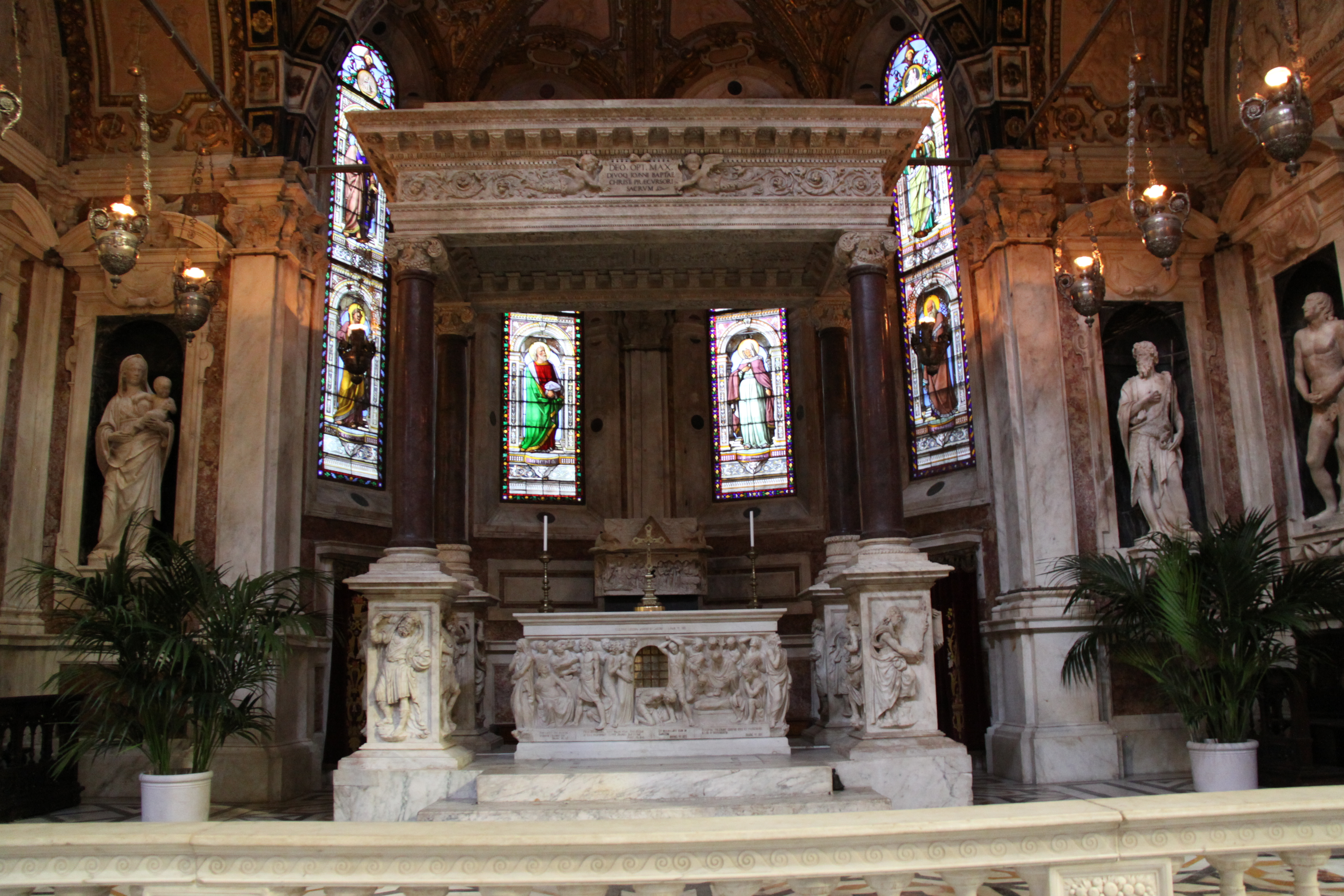
Genoa, Cathedral. Chapel of St. John the Baptist. All of the stained-glass windows in the chapel were created by De Matteis in 1876.

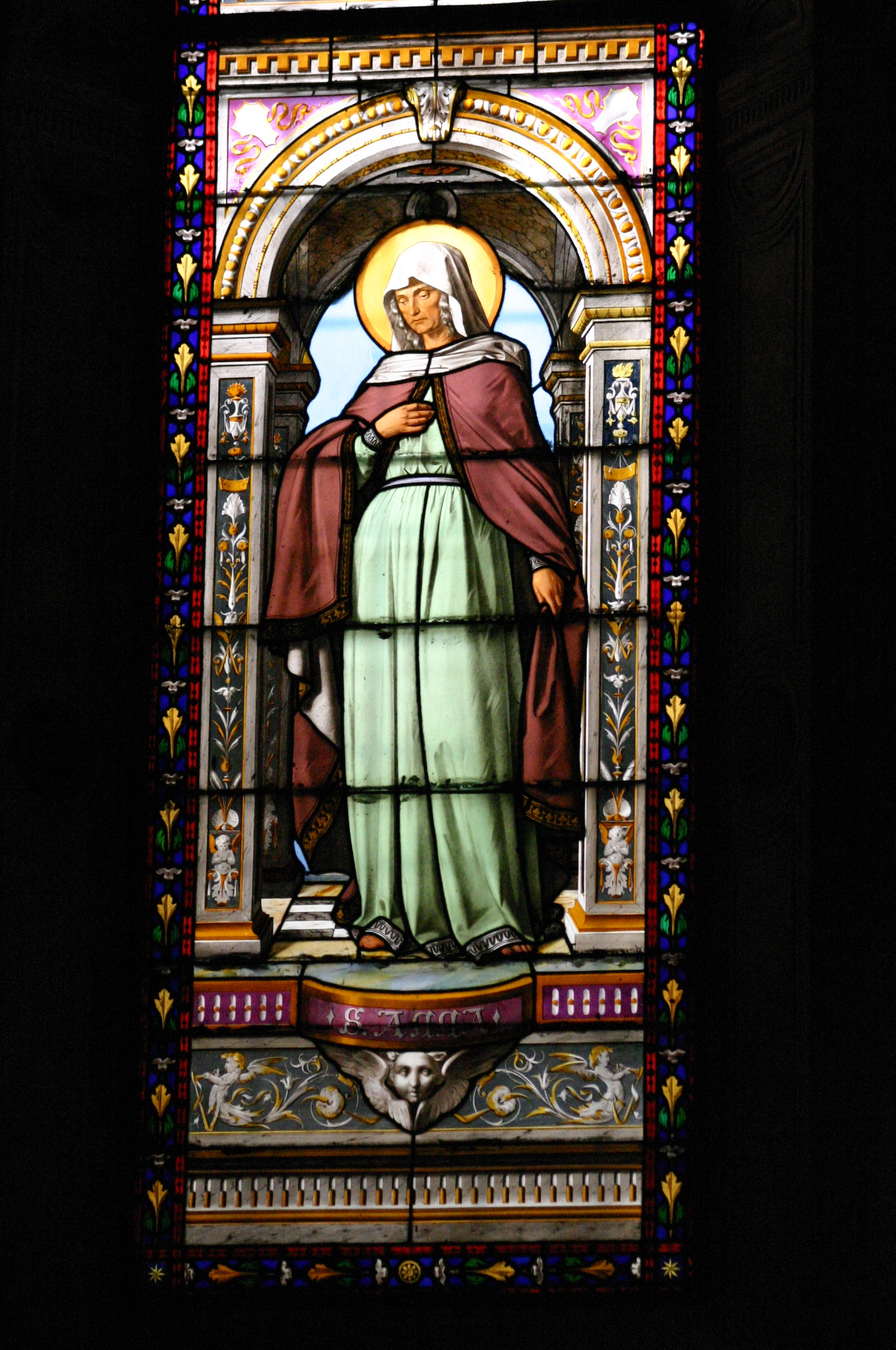
Ulisse De Matteis, Stained-glass window of St. Anne, Genoa Cathedral, Chapel of St. John the Baptist, 1876.

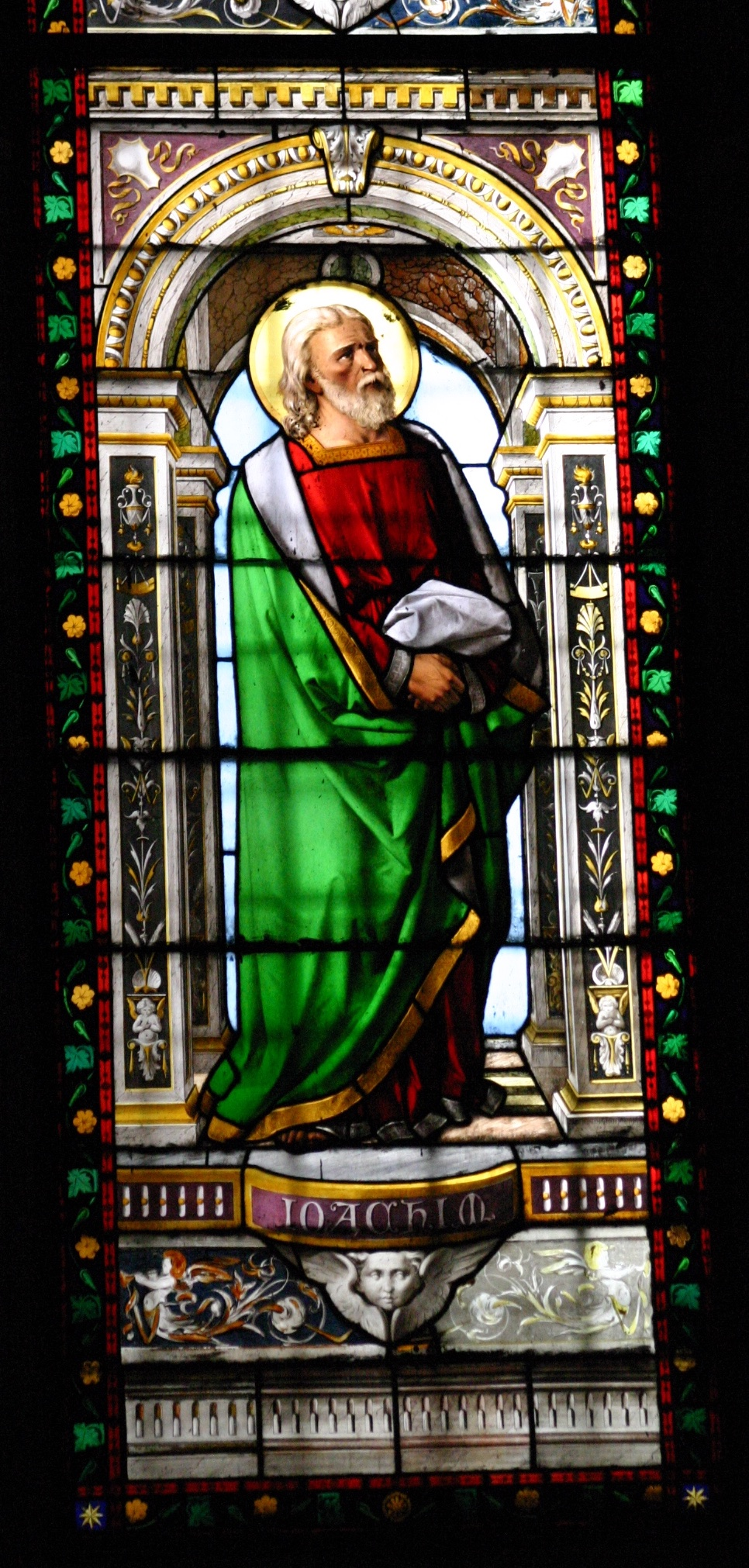
Ulisse De Matteis, Stained-glass window of St. Joachim, Genoa Cathedral, Chapel of St. John the Baptist, 1876.

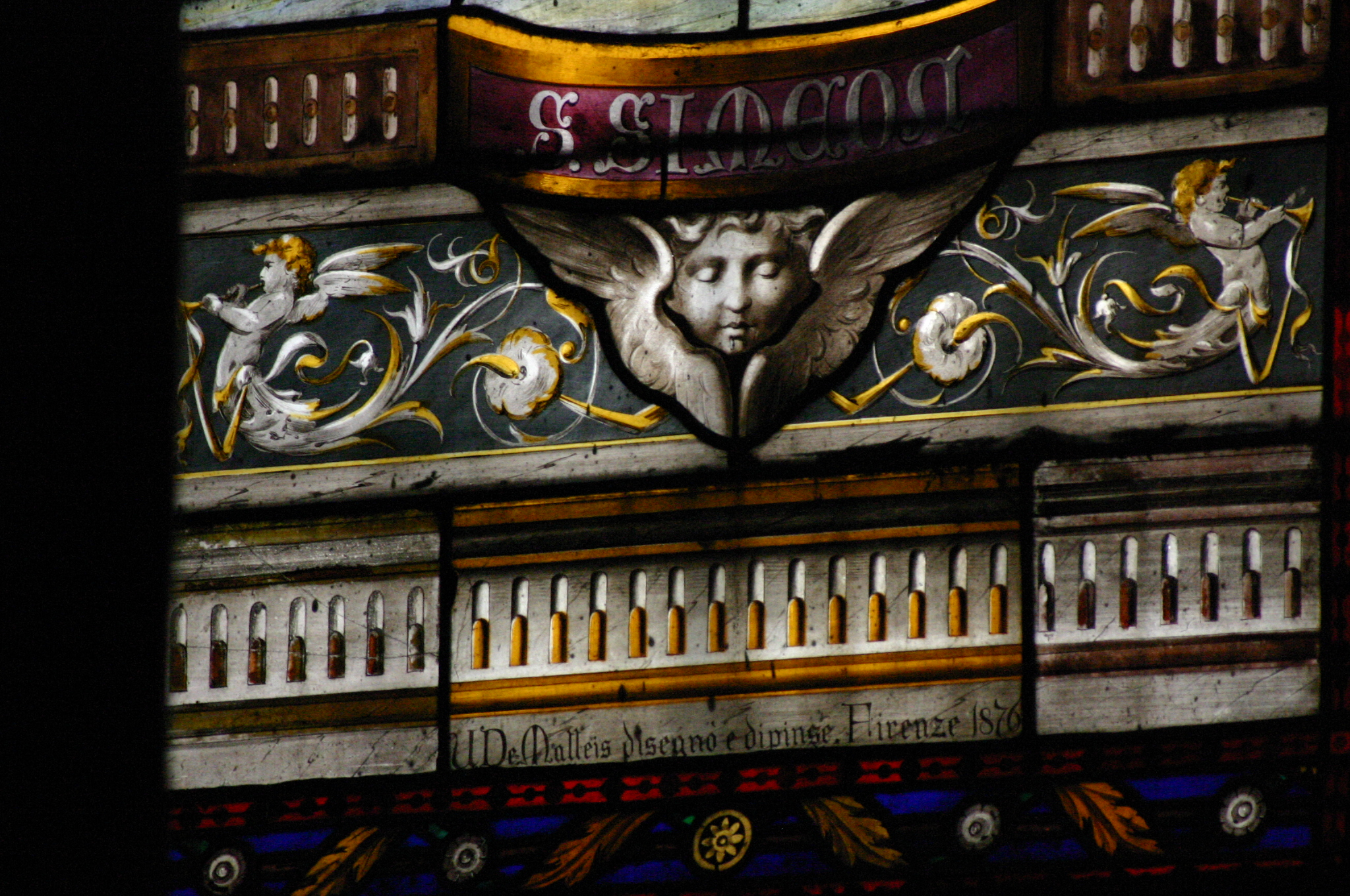
Genoa, cathedral. Chapel of St. John the Baptist. Detail of a stained glass window of St. Simeon that contains the inscription: U De Matteis disegno e dipinse. Firenze 1876.

== Commissions 1880-1895 ==
- Lastingham, UK, Church of St. Mary, 1880. During the restoration of the church, funded by Sydney Ringer, De Matteis was commissioned to create five windows in the chancel of the church. They depict: the Nativity, the Crucifixion of Christ, the Resurrection of Christ, Christ with Annie Ringer (the daughter of Sydney and Anne Ringer), and Christ with a Lily. The Crucifixion window includes the inscription: Sta. Francini e C: U.DM.N. Bruschi, Firenze 1880, U. De Matteis disegno e dipinse.
- Florence, Stibbert Museum, 1880s. The 1906 De Matteis catalog notes that the firm made the windows for the Castello Stibbert that became the Stibbert Museum. The windows are mainly crown glass with coats of arms at the top. There are numerous documents, bills, and letters about the creation of these windows in the Stibbert Museum archive. There was a great deal of exchange between Natale Bruschi and members of the De Matteis family; the letters often contain details about the De Matteis family, indicating that the De Matteis knew Frederick Stibbert personally.
- Florence, Old American Church, 1881–82. This church in the Piazza del Carmine was destroyed when the congregation moved to its current space in the Via Rucellai ca. 1910. One stained-glass window from the old church was preserved and reinstalled in the new church; although there is no signature on the window, it fits the description in the 1906 De Matteis catalog of a large window with detailed decoration created for the American Church. The window is currently installed behind the church organ, making it difficult to see.
- Siena, Cathedral, ca, 1880–1895. During the 1880s and 90s, De Matteis created numerous new stained-glass windows and restored old ones for Siena cathedral during restoration projects overseen by Giuseppe Partini, who served as the head architect of the cathedral. In addition to the commissions listed below, De Matteis also made crown glass windows, some decorated with coats of arms, for various parts of the cathedral complex, including the Siena Baptistery.
  - Siena, Cathedral, nave clerestory windows, 1881–83. Partini enlarged the clerestory of the cathedral, and the newly enlarged windows were filled with stained glass made by De Matteis. Between 1881 and 1883, De Matteis created large crown glass windows decorated with small images of blue and red seraphim for the central nave clerestory windows.
  - Siena, Cathedral, eastern nave clerestory windows, later 1880s. The windows in the clerestory of the eastern part of the nave are decorated with the coats of arms and portraits of Sienese popes, including: Pope Gregory VII (Aldobrandeschi), Pope Alexander III (Bandinelli-Cerretani), Pope Pius II (Piccolomini), Pope Pius III (Piccolomini-Todeschini), Pope Marcellus II (Cervini), Pope Paul V (Borghese), Pope Alexander VII (Chigi), and Pope Leo XIII (Pecci).
  - Siena, Cathedral, dome drum windows, 1888. De Matteis created twelve windows depicting the Apostles, which were installed in the drum of the dome in 1888.
  - Siena, Cathedral, dome lantern windows, 1892. In 1890, there was a fire in the lantern of the dome. A new marble lantern was built, and De Matteis equipped it with eight crown glass windows in 1892. The style and color palette of these windows reference medieval Italian glass--most notably 14th-century stained-glass windows in the church of Santa Croce in Florence.
- Chiusi, Concattedrale di San Secondiano, 1887–94. As part of the substantial restoration of the church by architect Giuseppe Partini, De Matteis created several windows, including: the ten crown glass nave windows and the windows in the counterfacade, which depict which depict Christ Pantocrator, Quinto Velio, Blessed Bishop Mark, Blessed Nerania Martyr, St. Paul, and St. Peter.

=== Gallery of Work 1880-1895 ===
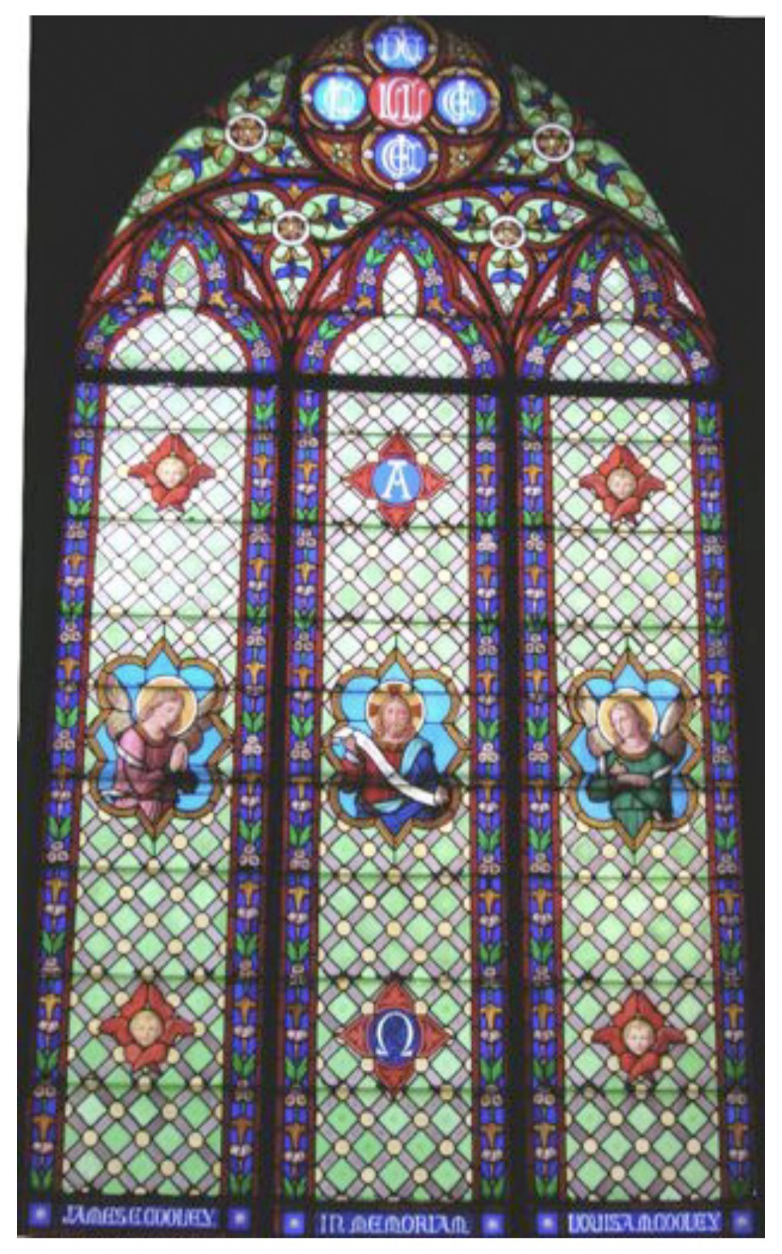
Ulisse De Matteis, Stained-glass window from the Old American church in Florence, ca. 1881–82. Currently installed in St. James Episcopal Church in Florence.

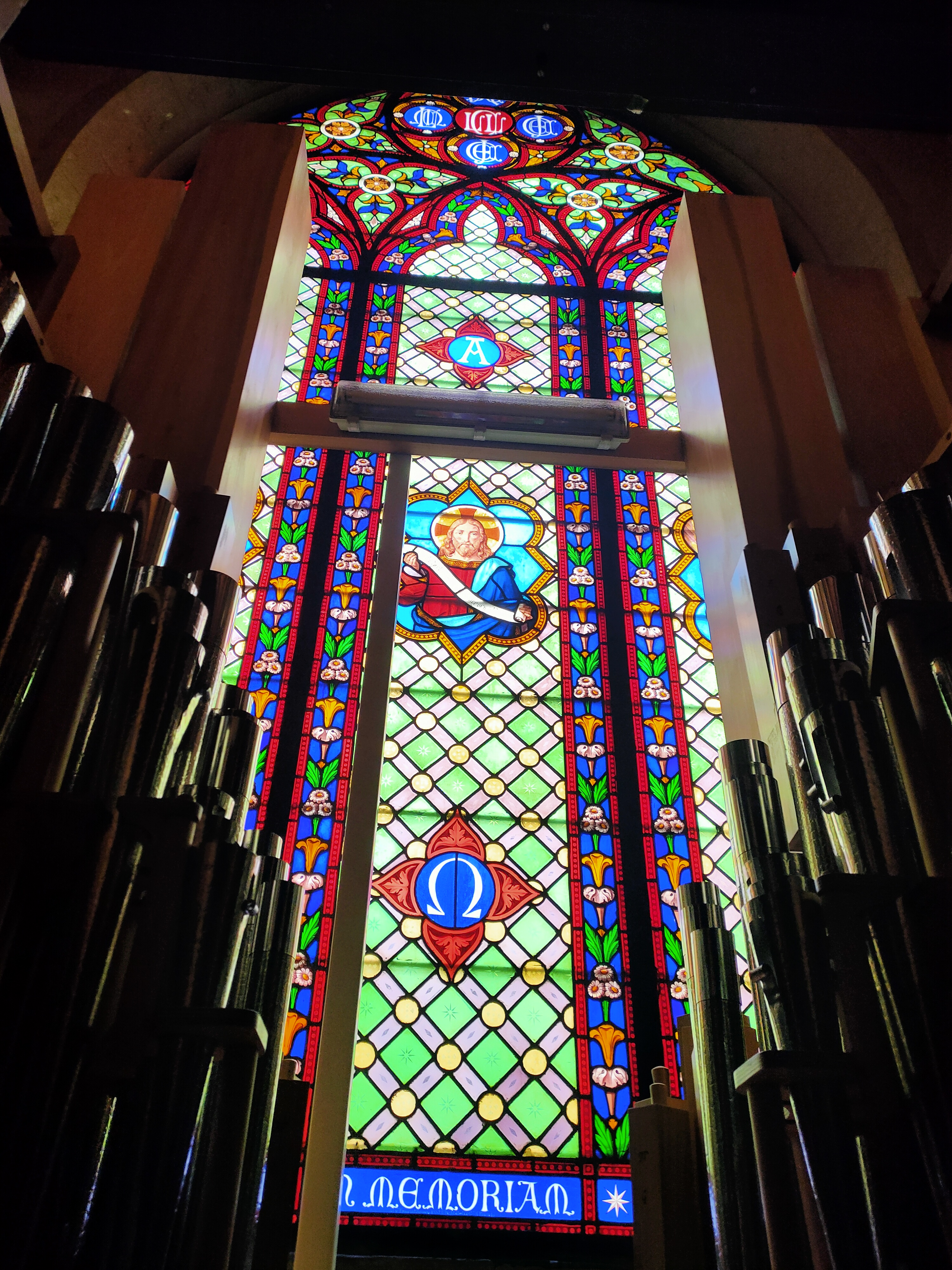
Ulisse De Matteis, detail of the stained-glass window from the Old American church in Florence, ca. 1881–82. Currently installed in St. James Episcopal Church in Florence.

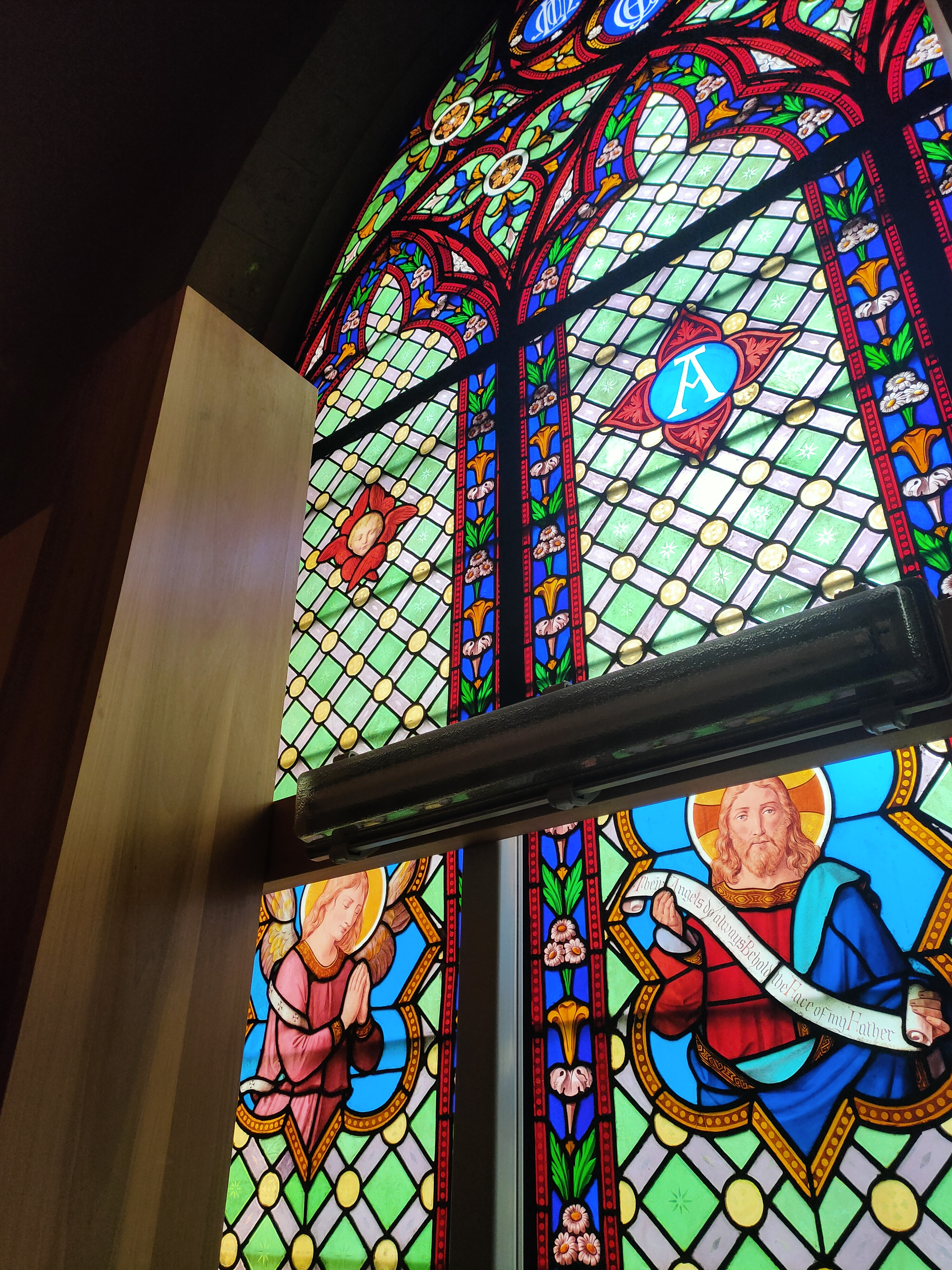
Ulisse De Matteis, detail of Christ and Angel from the stained-glass window from the Old American church in Florence, ca. 1881–82. Currently installed in St. James Episcopal Church in Florence.

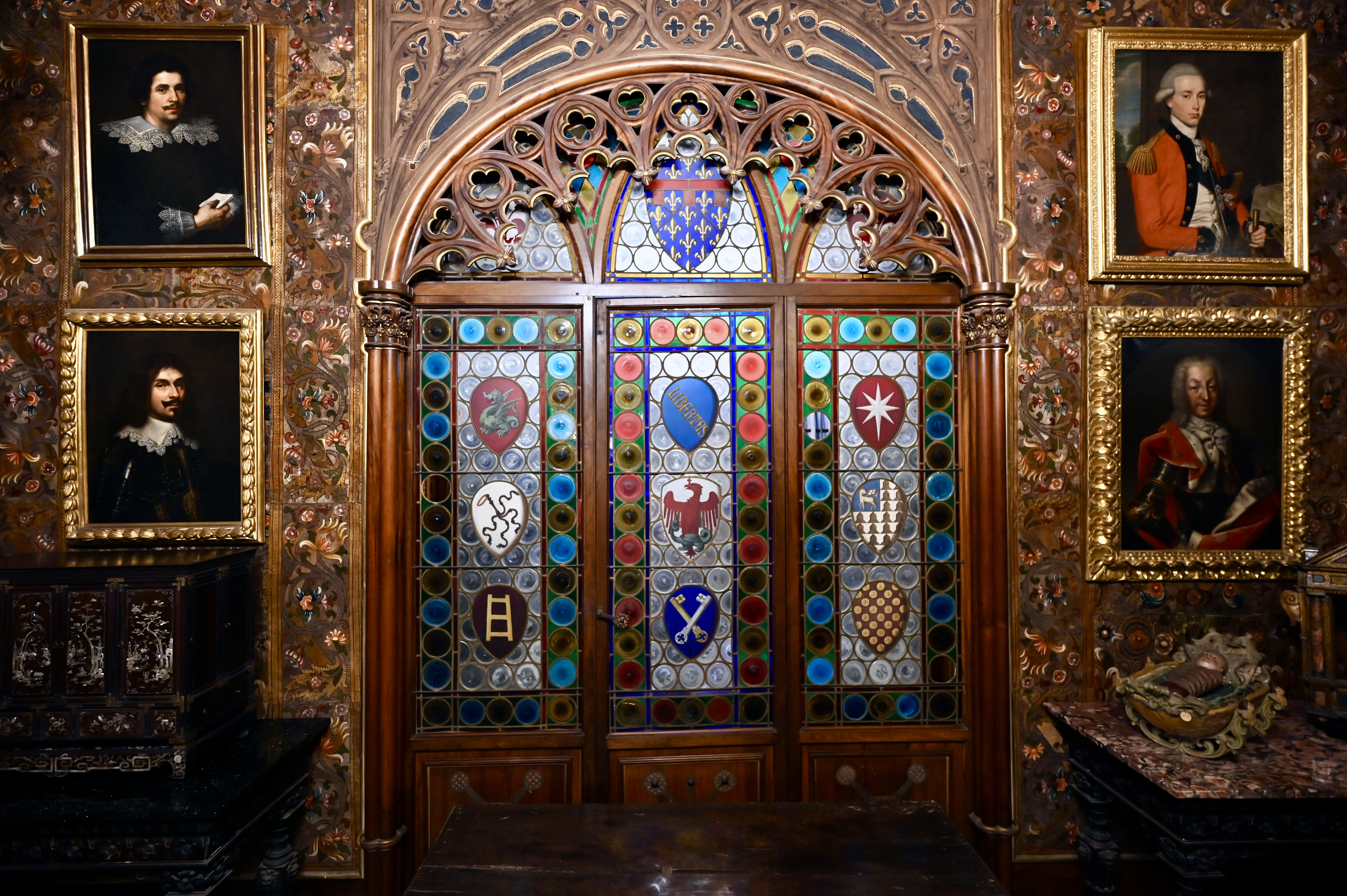
Ulisse De Matteis, Stained glass window in the Stibbert Museum, 1880s.

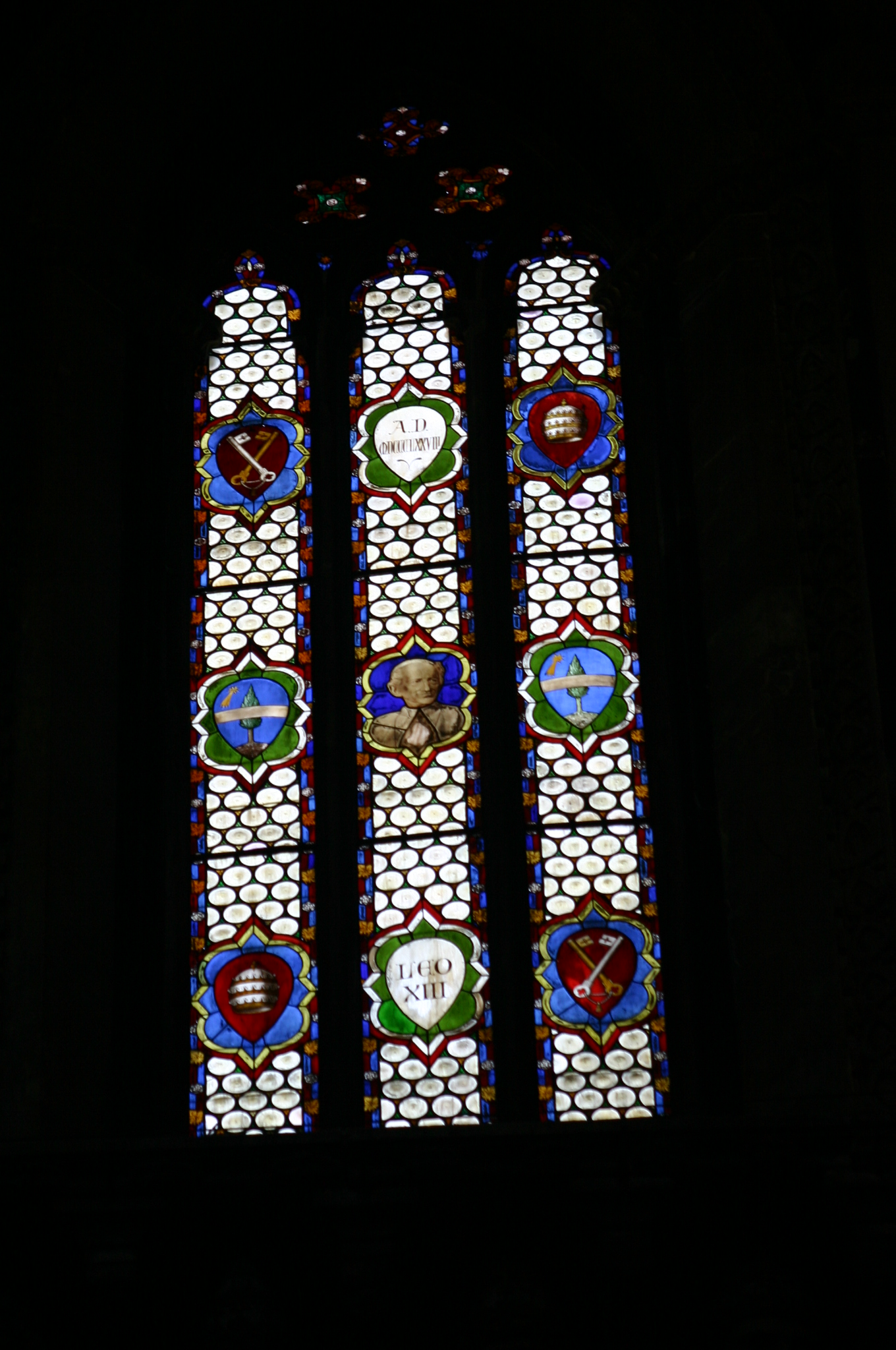
Ulisse De Matteis, Stained-glass window dedicated to Pope Leo XIII, Siena Cathedral clerestory, ca. 1885–89.

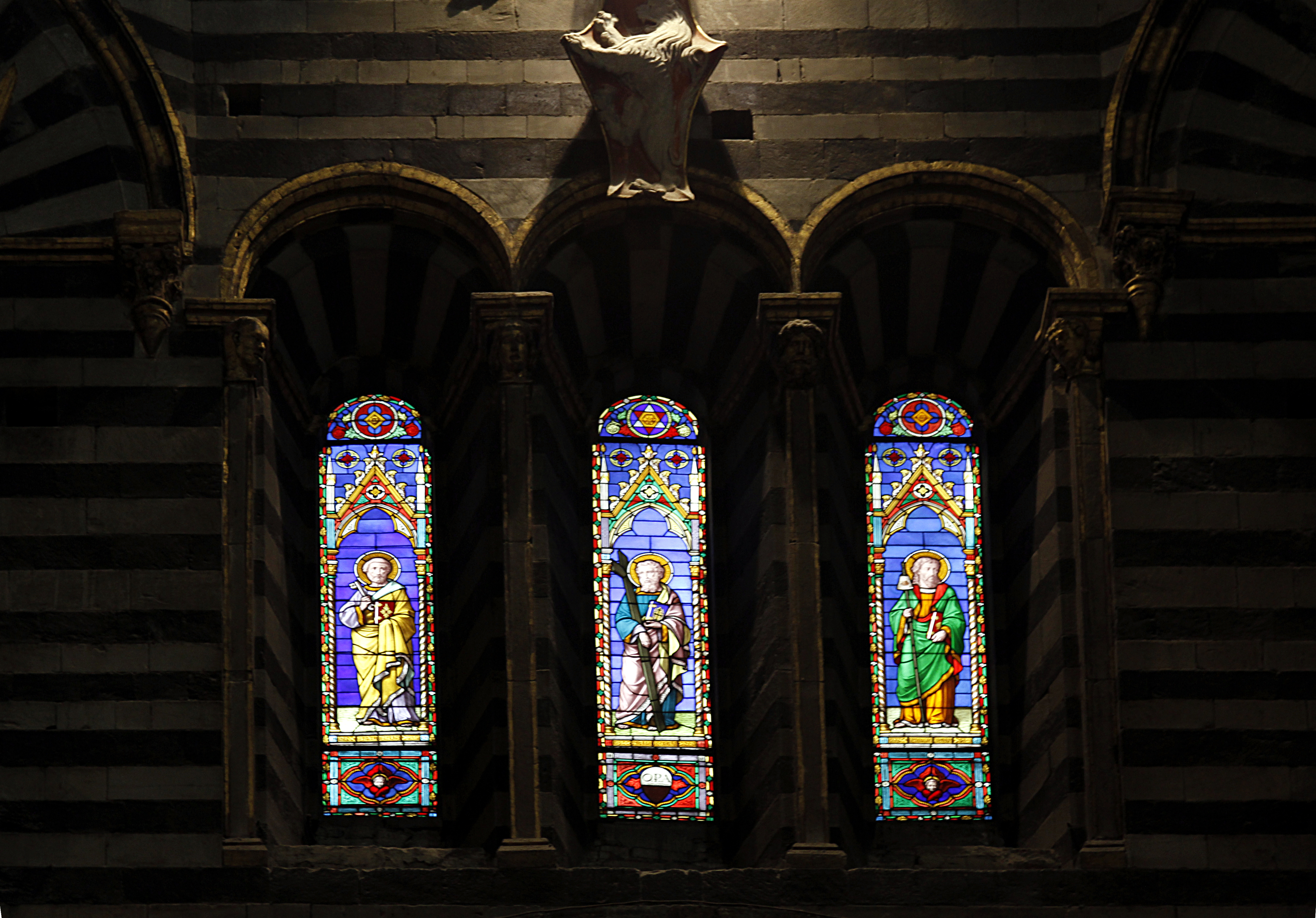
Ulisse De Matteis, Stained-glass windows depicting three Apostles in the drum of the dome of Siena Cathedral, installed in 1888.

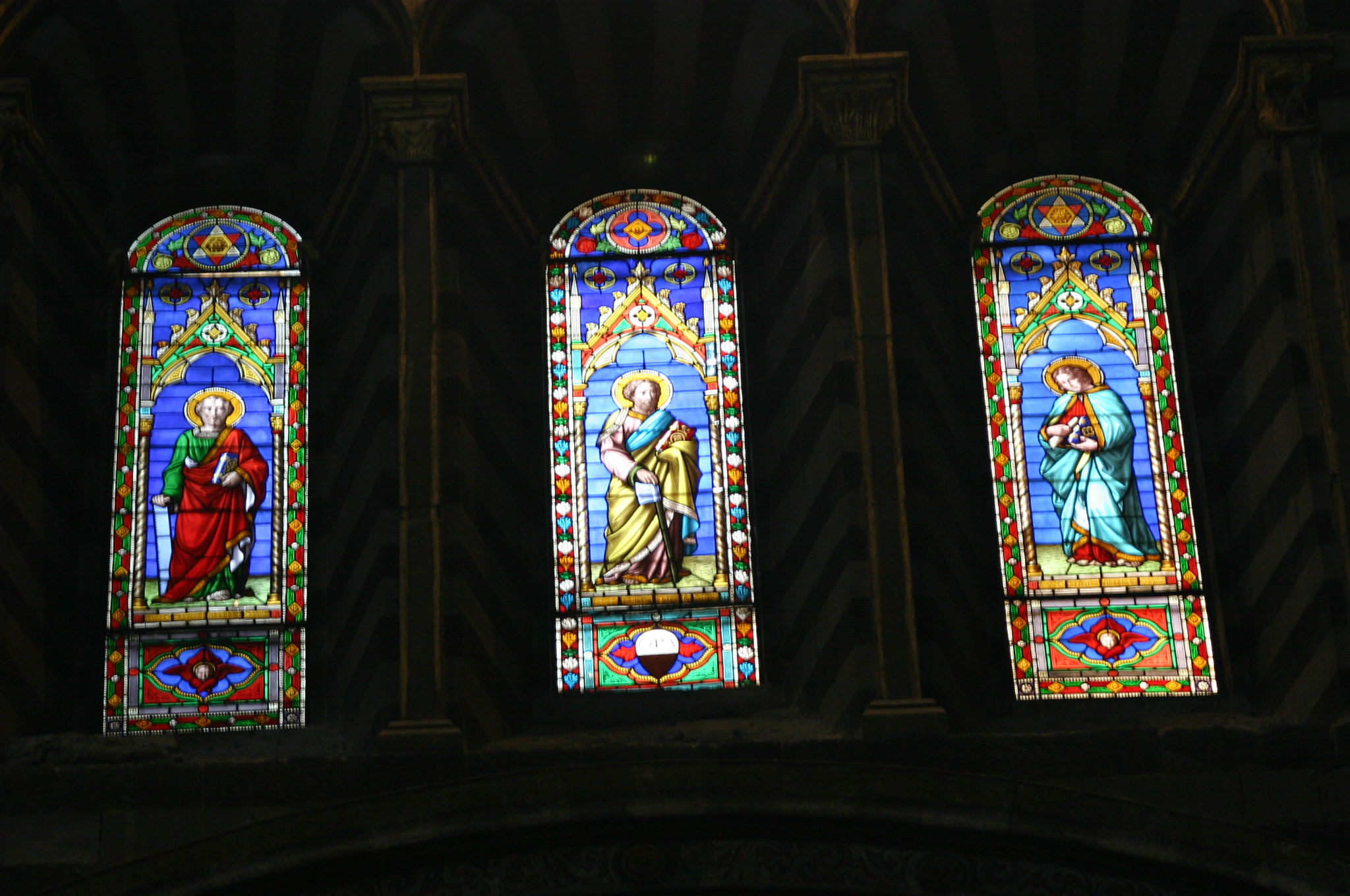
Ulisse De Matteis, Stained-glass windows depicting three Apostles in the drum of the dome of Siena Cathedral, installed in 1888.

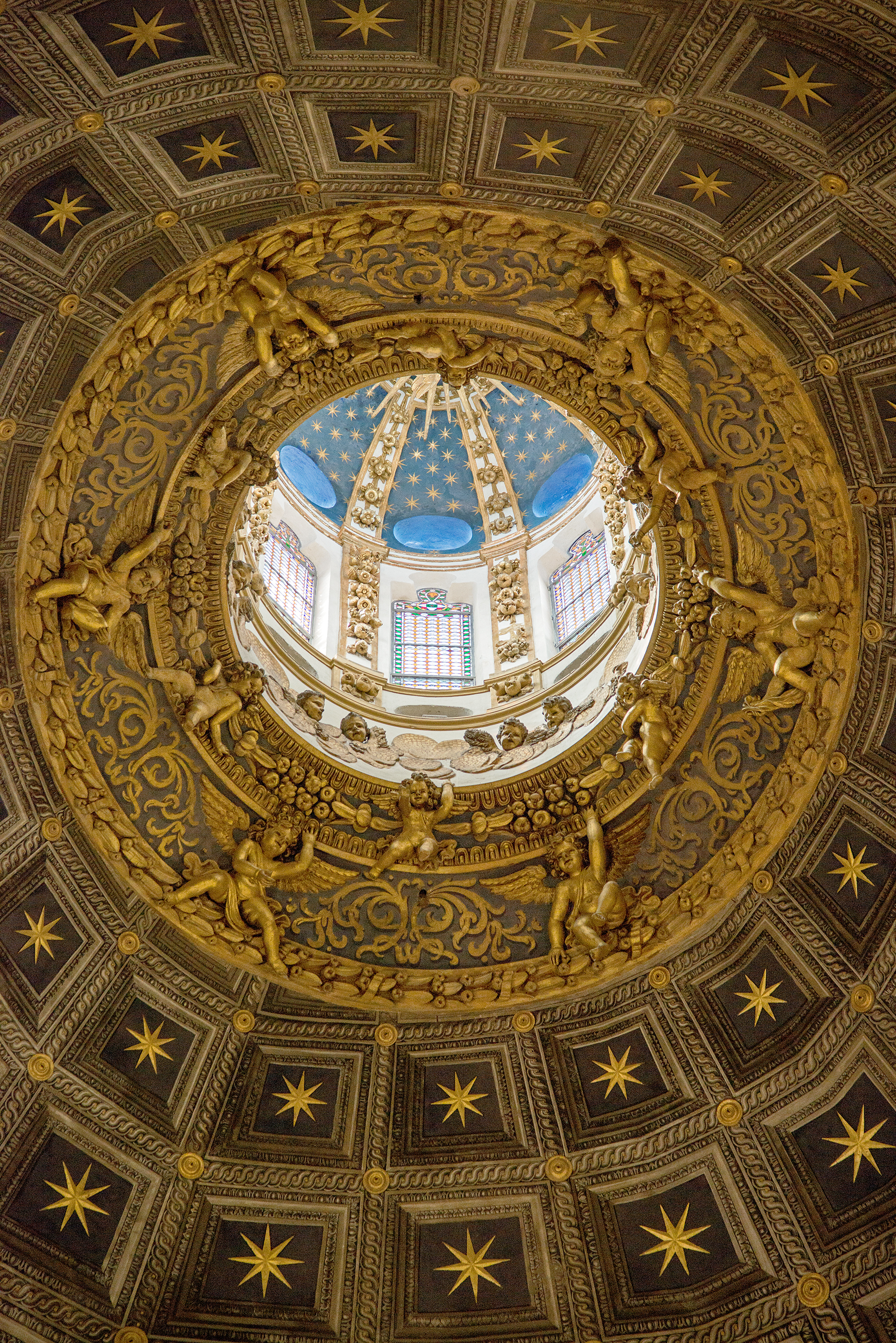
Dome of Siena Cathedral, view into the lantern with crown glass windows created by Ulisse De Matteis and installed in 1892.

== Commissions 1895-1902 ==
- Florence, Santa Maria Novella, Sacristy window, 1895. De Matteis was commissioned by the city of Florence to restore this window, created ca. 1389 based on drawings by the painter Niccolò di Pietro Gerini, and also to add a scene of the Nativity, which was missing from the original. De Matteis commented on his work in Santa Maria Novella in an 1898 interview in the British journal The Studio: An Illustrated Magazine of Fine and Applied Art: "I would defy any one to separate the modern work from the ancient in those windows. Even I who put them up can scarcely tell where the old work ends and mine begins."
- Florence, Santa Trinita, apse window, 1897. The De Matteis firm's 1906 and 1915 catalogs both describe the window as "A large apse window divided into sections, with a representation of the Trinity and the figures of six saints of the Vallombrosian Order, commissioned by a parish committee as part of the general restoration of the monumental Church." The restoration of the church was overseen by architect Giuseppe Castelazzi, who sought to return the church to what he believed to be its original, medieval state. The window is signed and dated: ULISSE DE MATTEIS DISEGNÒ E DIPINSE. FIRENZE 1897. The window was damaged during WWII and restored by the Polloni studio in 1946, as an additional inscription on the window indicates.
- Siena, Santa Maria in Portico a Fontegiusta, ca. 1897–1900. De Matteis created various crown glass windows decorated with coats of arms for the church, probably during the restoration campaign of the 1890s.
- Florence (Soffiano), Funerary chapels of the Torrigiani and Brini families, 1898. According to both De Matteis catalogs, the firm created windows for each of these chapels located in the Soffiano cemetery designed by architect Michelangiolo Maiorfi (1823–1906) and constructed between 1896 and 1898.
- Siena, San Clemente dei Servi, 1899. De Matteis created all of the windows in the church, from the crown glass windows to the five figural windows in the high altar chapel. De Matteis' work was part of the restoration campaign overseen by Agenore Socini. During this time, the five pointed windows in the high altar area, which had been covered, were opened and framed in marble. According to the signature on the window depicting Sts. Giuliana and Giovanna, "U. De Matteis carried out and painted, Florence, 1899, with drawings of the three figures in the center by A. Franchi and the others by G. Catani."
- Arezzo, Sant'Andrea dei Pigli, 1900. De Matteis created several stained-glass windows for the church, which was constructed by architect Pilade Ghiandai between 1890 and 1899, following the destruction of the medieval church on the site.
- Siena, Oratory of Santa Caterina (now called the Church of St. Elizabeth of the Visitation), 1896–1901. De Matteis created two windows for the apse of this church during a redecoration overseen by Alessandro Franchi and architect Agenore Socini. One window depicts St. Agnes in the central roundel and the other St. Sabina.

=== Gallery of work 1895-1902 ===
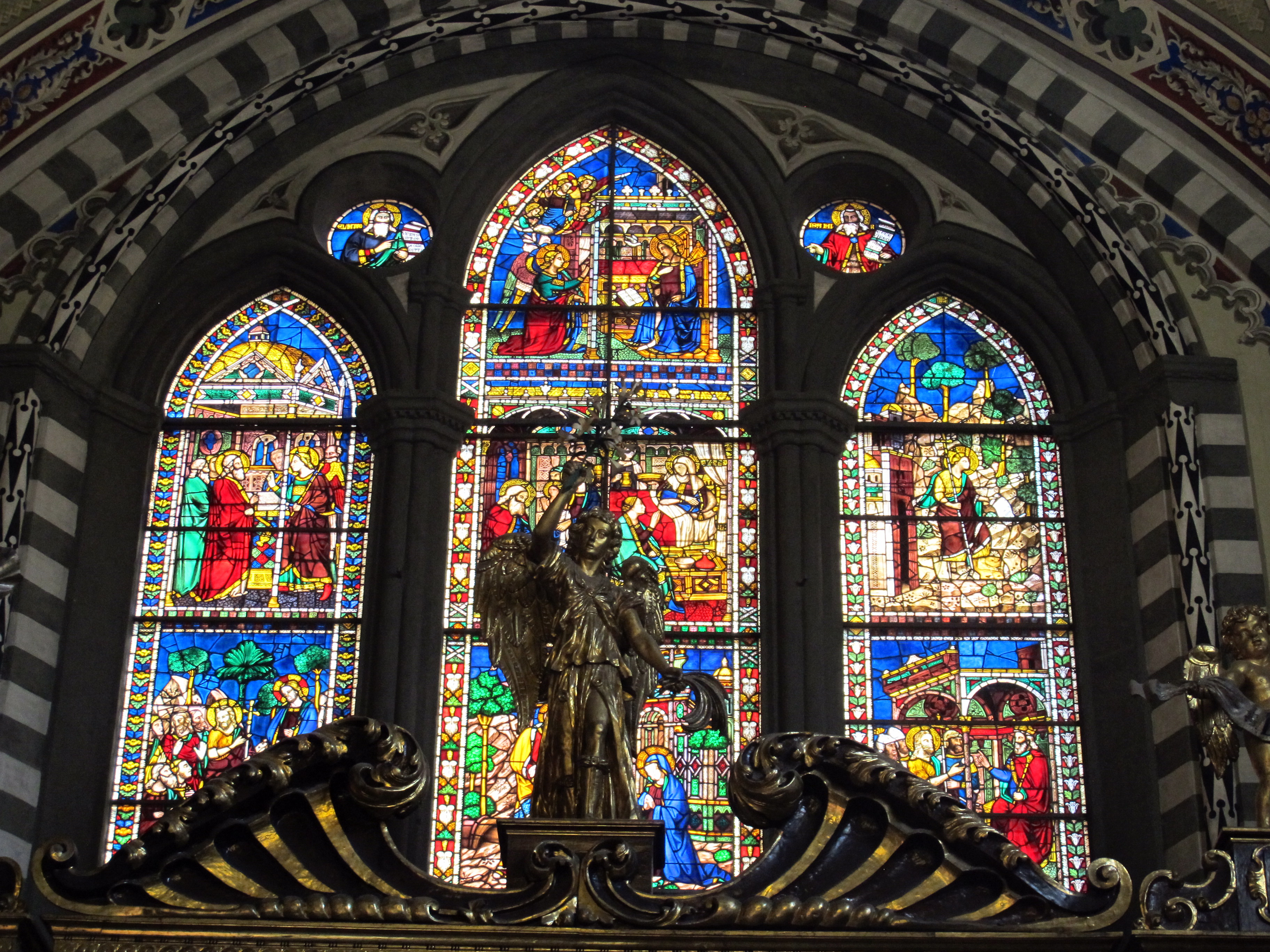
Stained-glass window from ca. 1389 in the Sacristy of Santa Maria Novella, Florence. The whole window was restored in 1895 by the De Matteis firm. The bottom central panel depicting the Nativity was created ex novo by De Matteis in 1895.

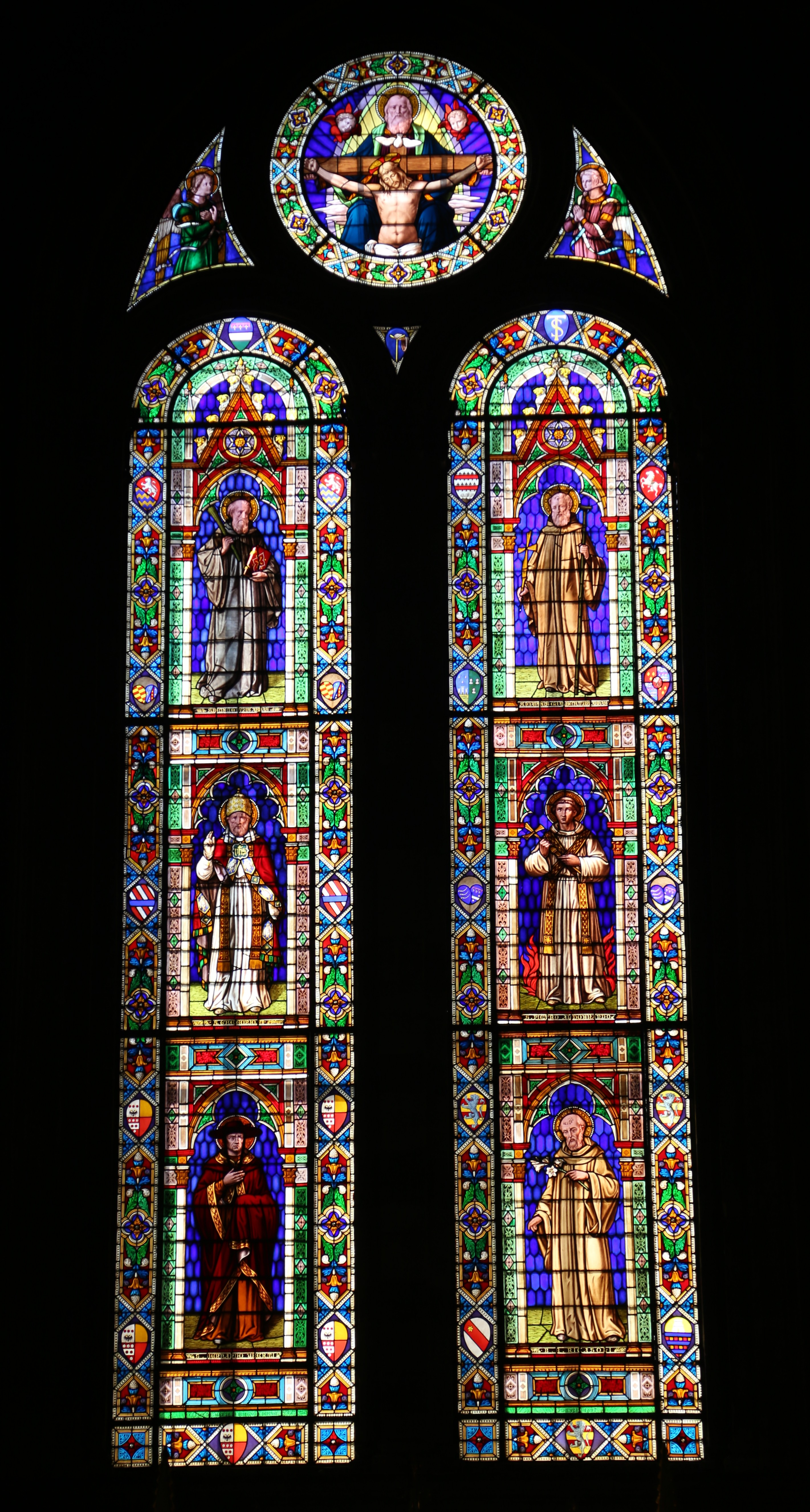
Ulisse De Matteis, stained-glass window depicting Benedictine and Vallombrosian saints, Santa Trinity, Florence, 1897.

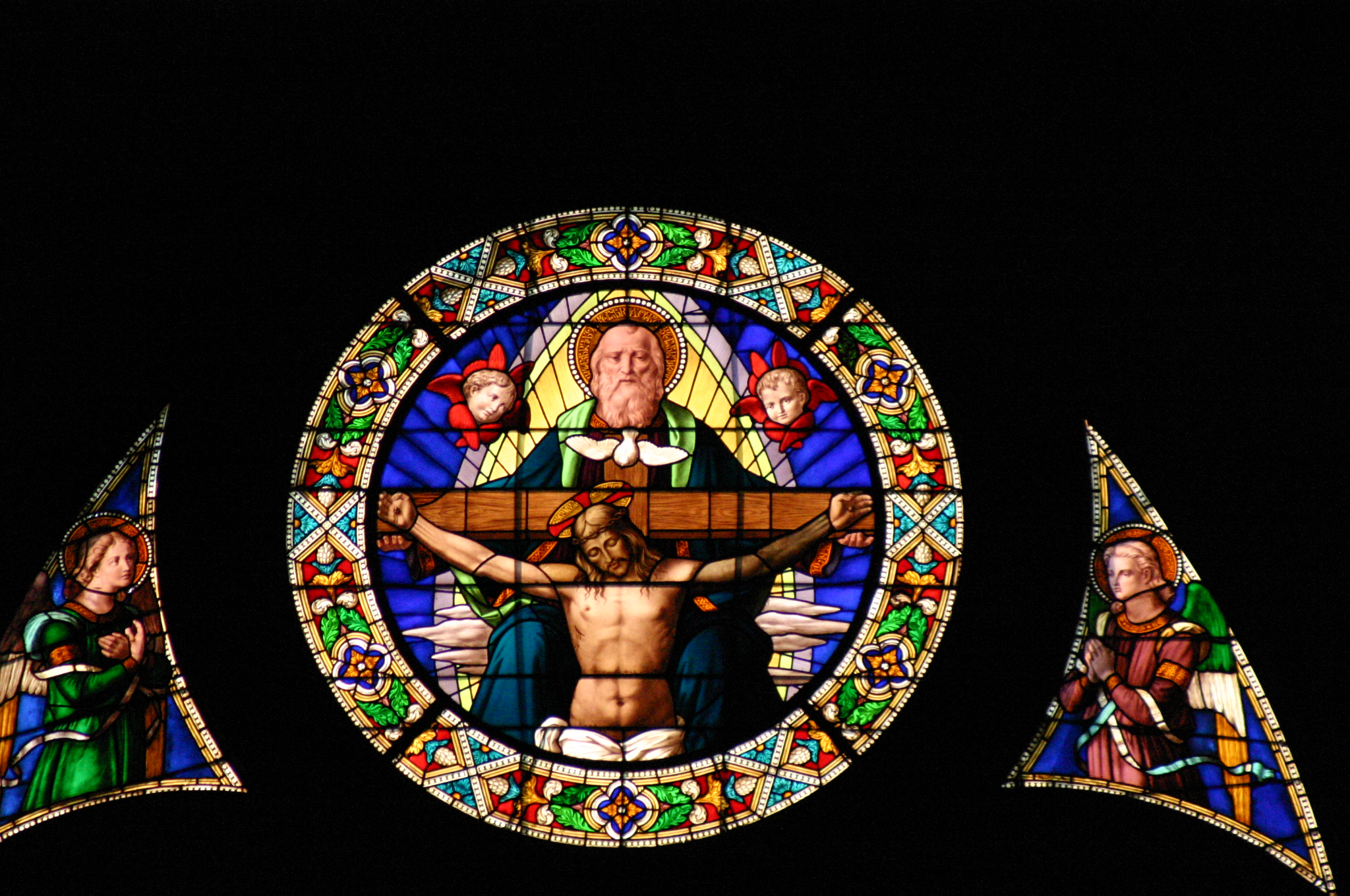
Ulisse De Matteis, Trinity, detail of the stained glass window in the apse of Santa Trinita, Florence. 1897.

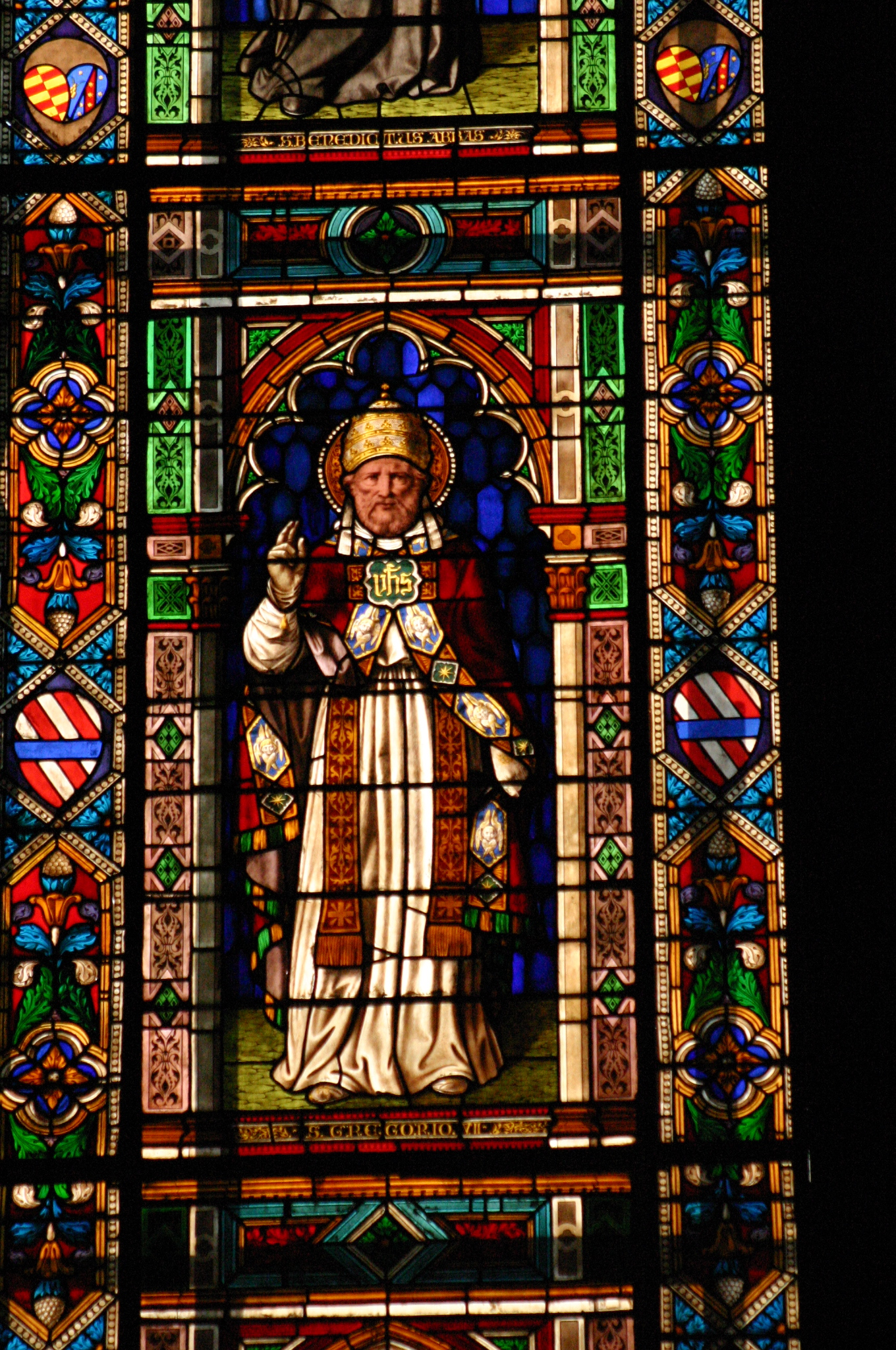
Ulisse De Matteis, St. Gregory, detail of the stained glass window in the apse of Santa Trinita, Florence. 1897.

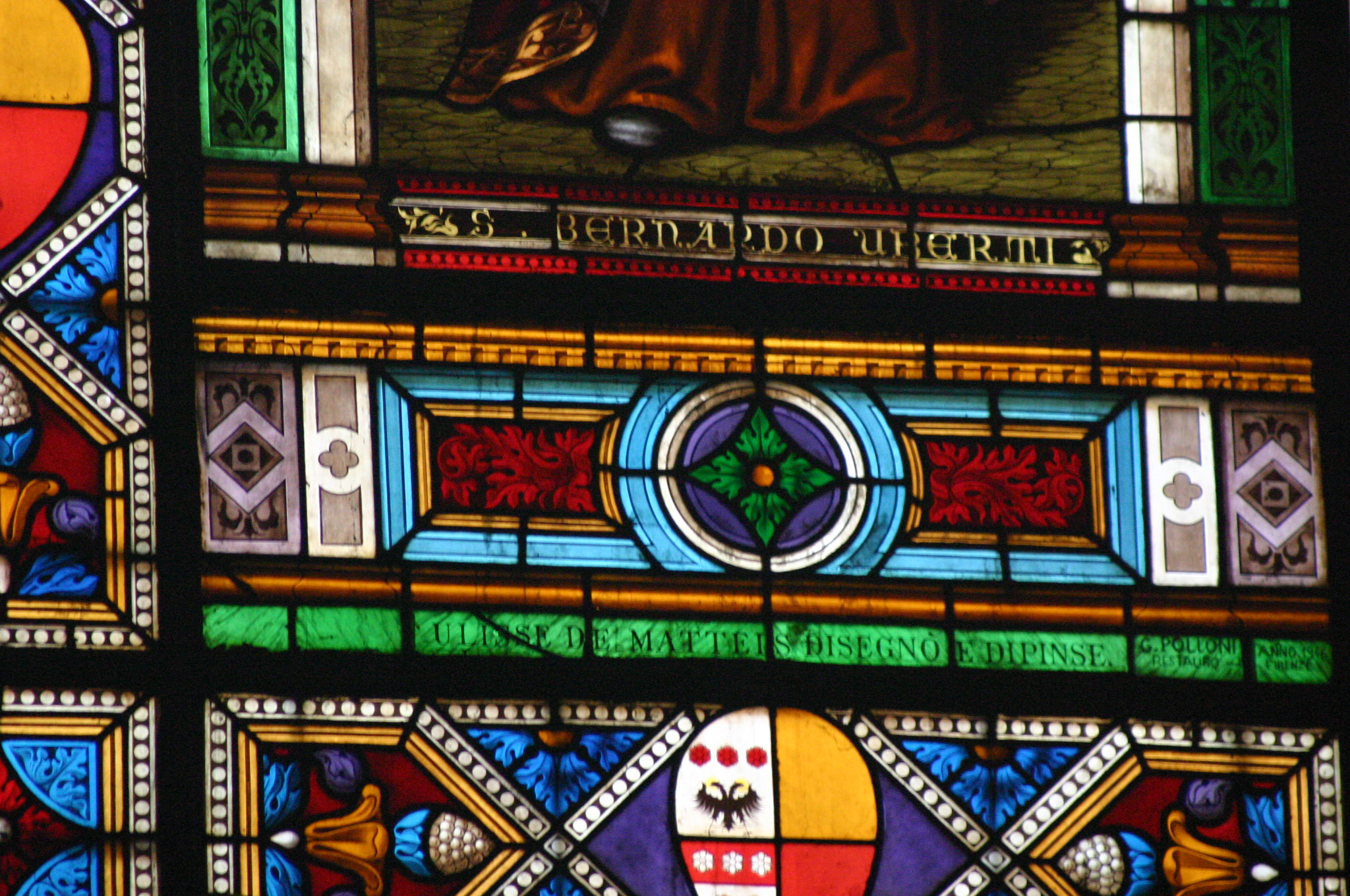
Ulisse De Matteis, detail showing signatures of De Matteis and Polloni, stained glass window in the apse of Santa Trinita, Florence. 1897.

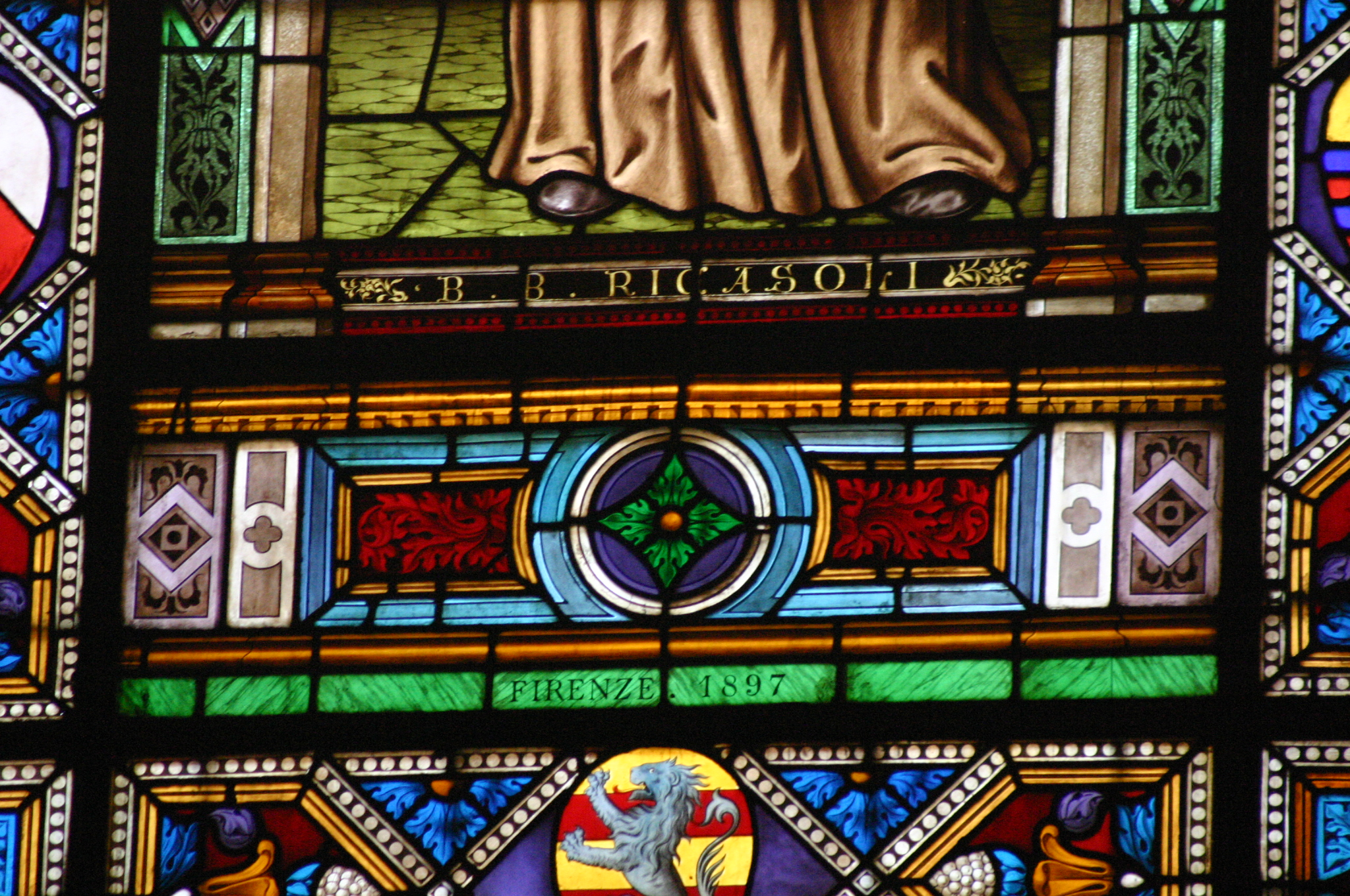
Ulisse De Matteis, detail showing place and date, stained glass window in the apse of Santa Trinita, Florence. 1897.

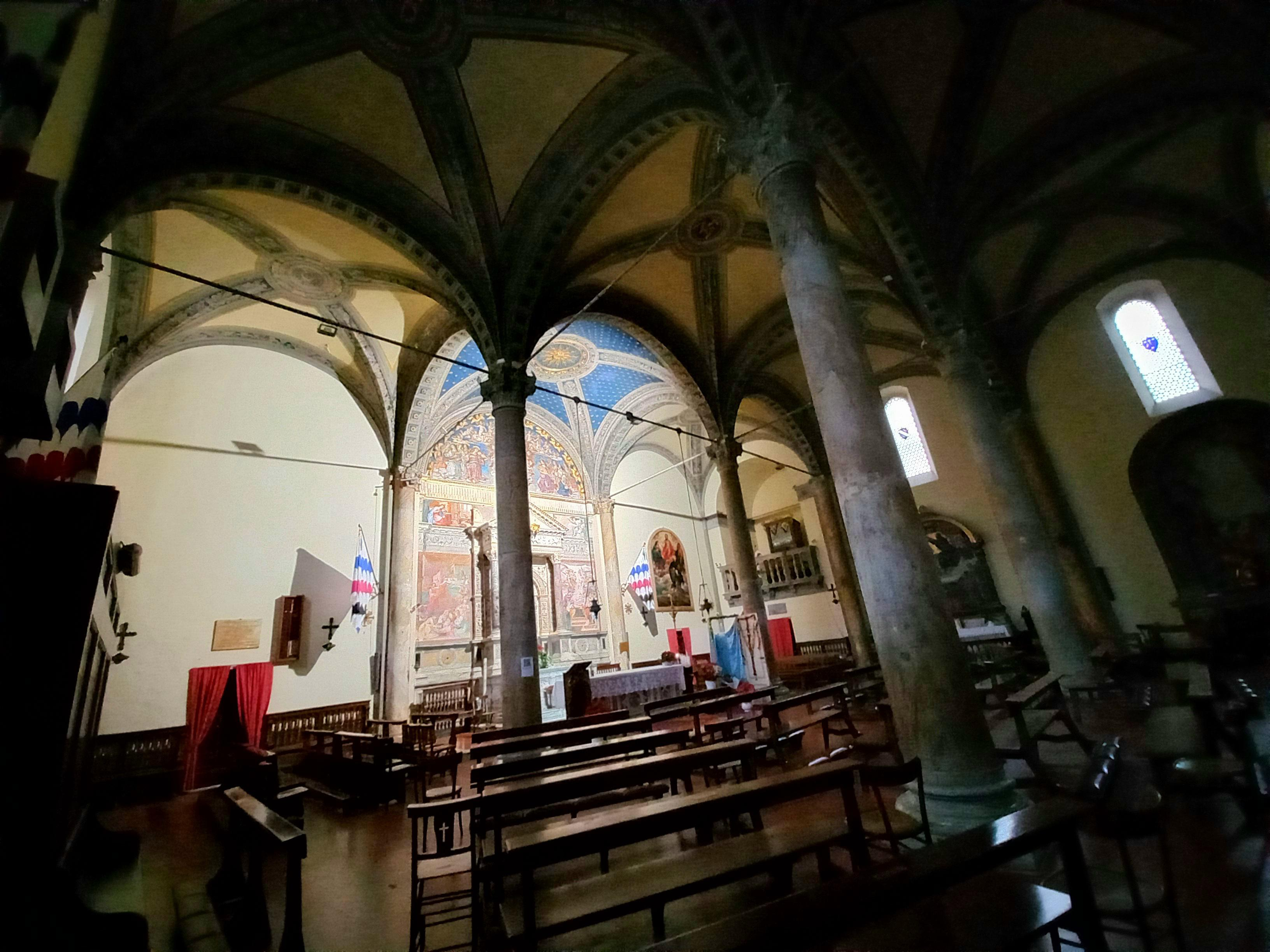
Interior of the church of Santa Maria in Portico a Fontegiuta in Siena, showing two windows with coats of arms created by Ulisse De Matteis, ca. 1897–1900.

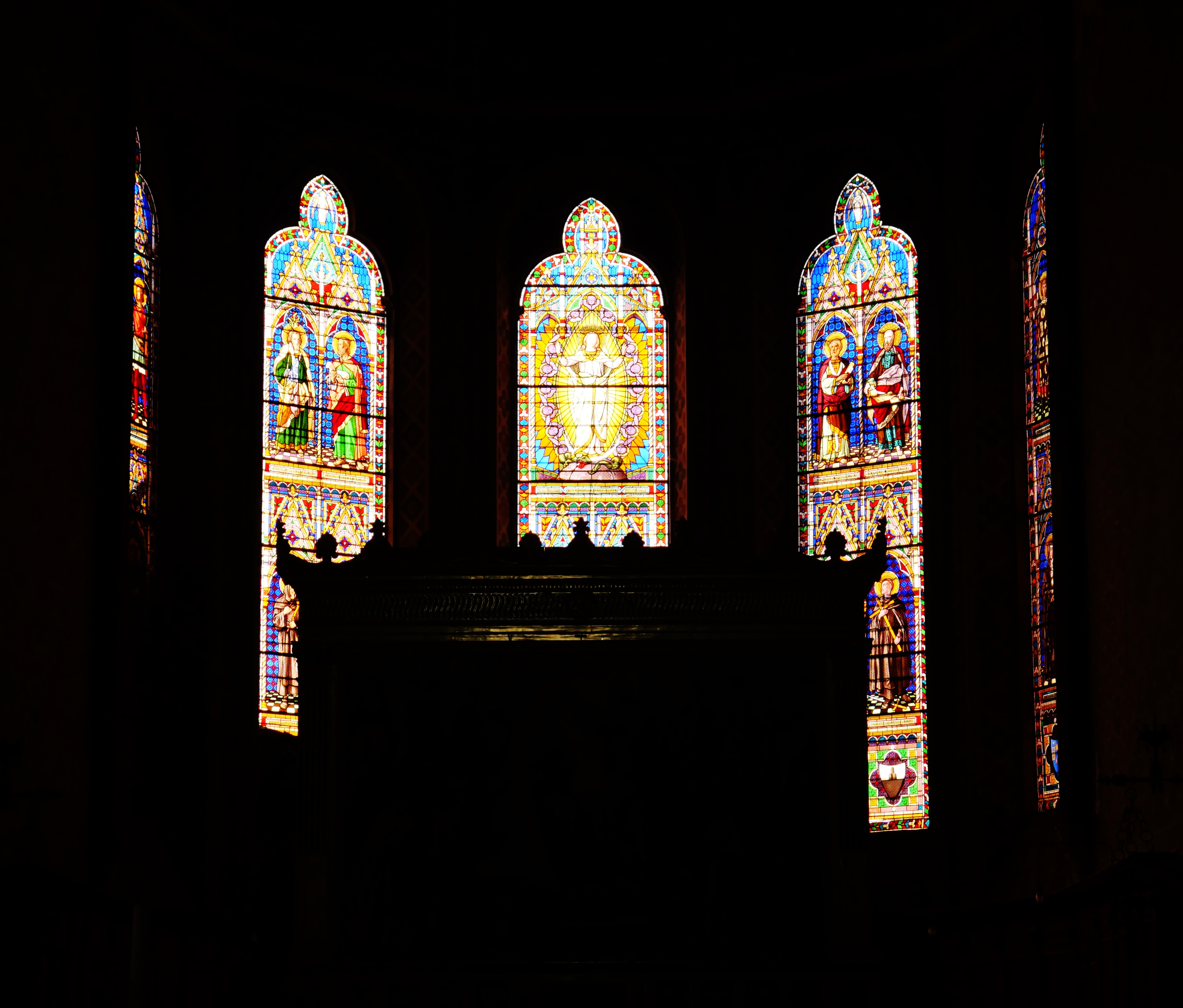
Ulisse De Matteis, five stained-glass windows in the high altar chapel of Santa Maria dei Servi in Siena, 1899. The window designs were created by Alessandro Franchi and Giuseppe Catani.

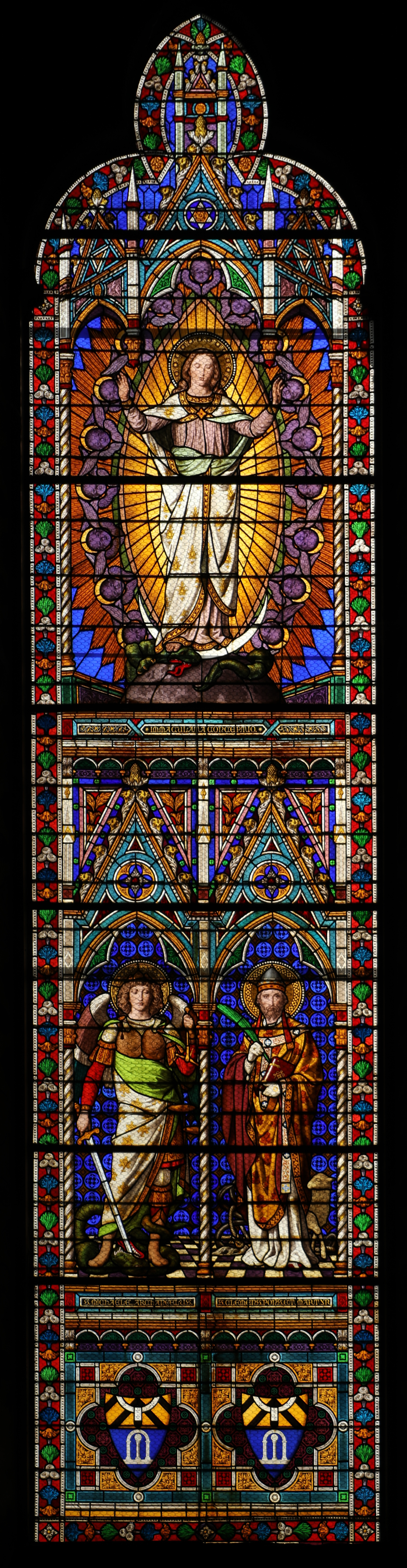
Ulisse De Matteis, Stained-glass window in the high altar chapel of Santa Maria dei Servi in Siena, 1899. The window designs were created by Alessandro Franchi and Giuseppe Catani. This central window shows the Assumption of the Virgin above the Archangel Michael and St. Clement.

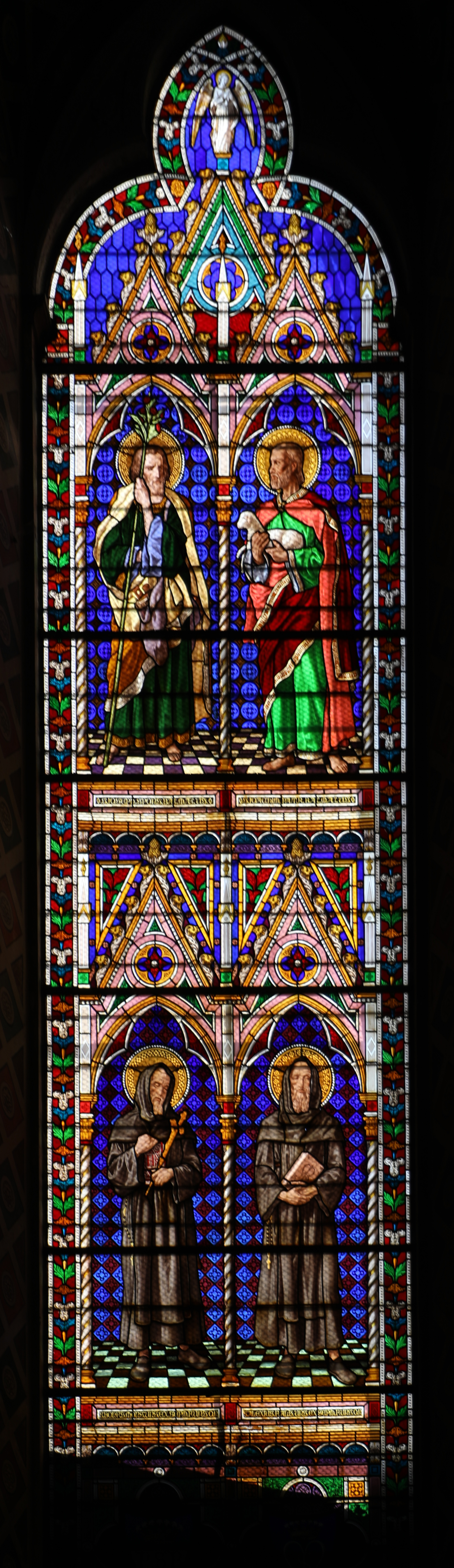
Ulisse De Matteis, Stained-glass window in the high altar chapel of Santa Maria dei Servi in Siena, 1899. The window designs were created by Alessandro Franchi and Giuseppe Catani. This window shows: St. Joseph, Joachim, St. Bonagiunta, and St. Alessio.

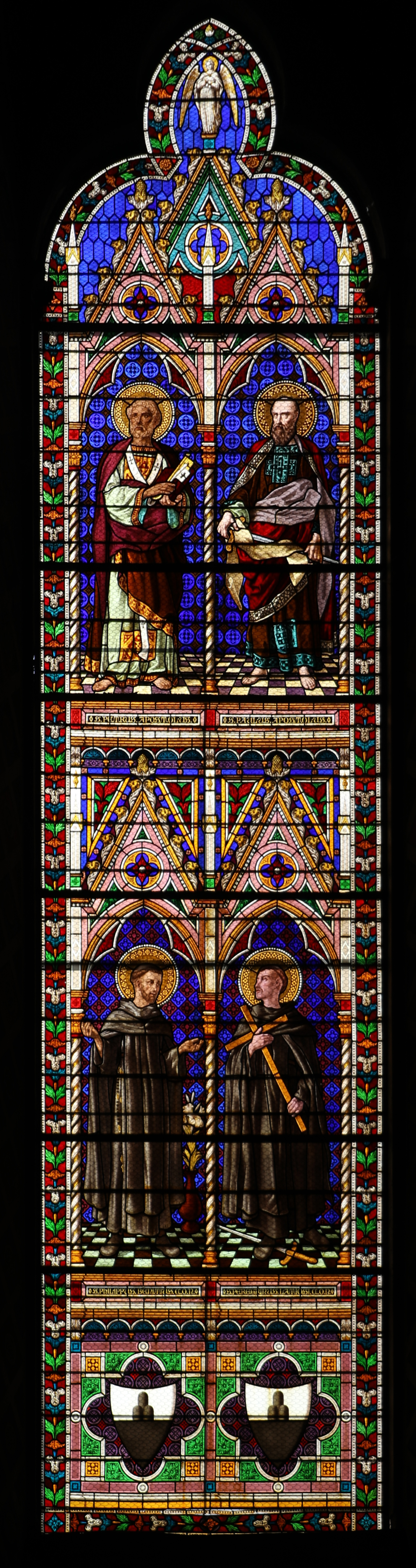
Ulisse De Matteis, Stained-glass window in the high altar chapel of Santa Maria dei Servi in Siena, 1899. The window designs were created by Alessandro Franchi and Giuseppe Catani. This window shows St. Peter, St. Paul, St. Philip, and St. Peregrinus.

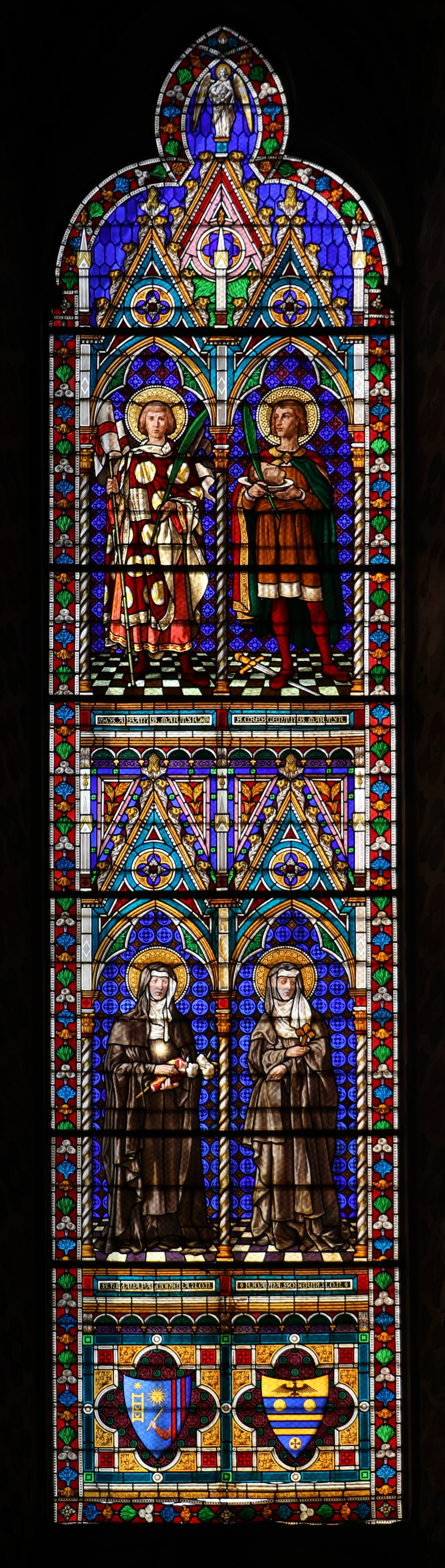
Ulisse De Matteis, Stained-glass window in the high altar chapel of Santa Maria dei Servi in Siena, 1899. The window designs were created by Alessandro Franchi and Giuseppe Catani. This window depicts St. Ansanus, St. Crescentius, St. Giuliana Falconieria, and Blessed Joanna Soderini.

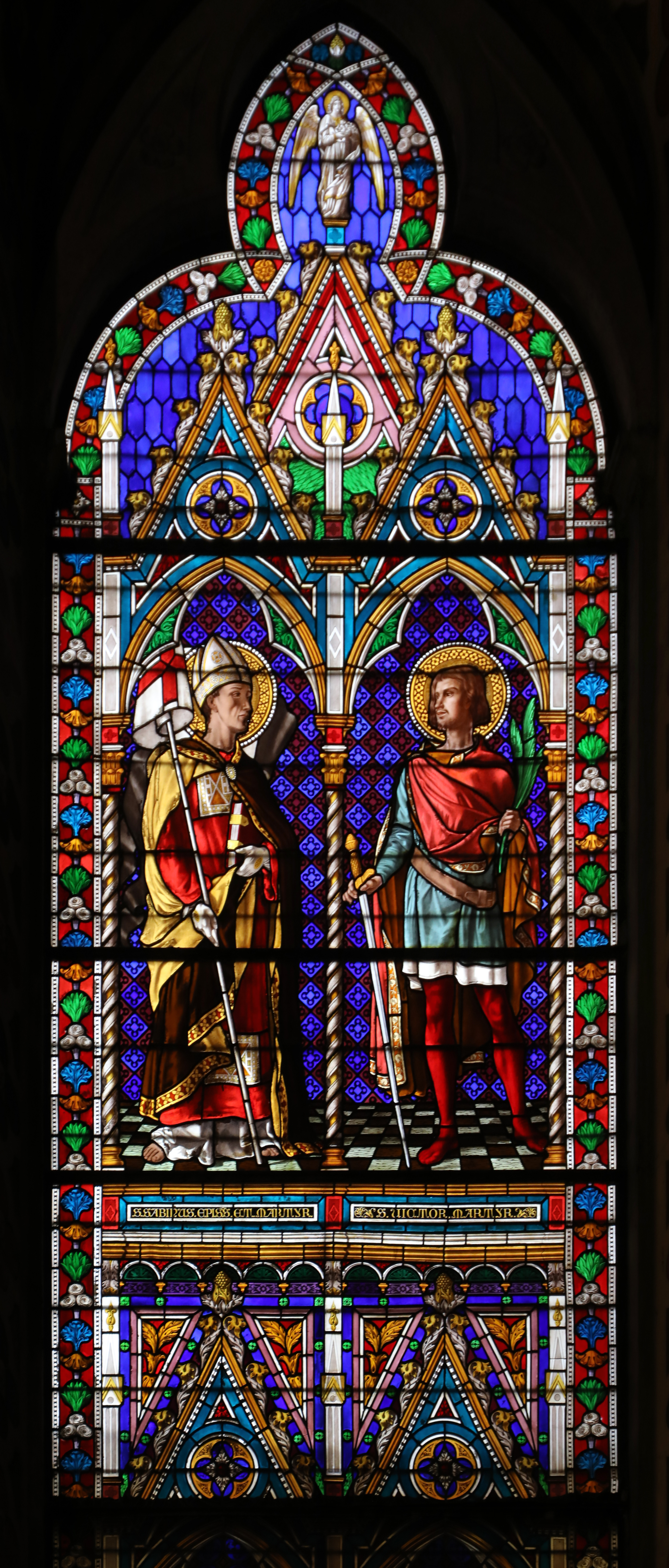
Ulisse De Matteis, Stained-glass window in the high altar chapel of Santa Maria dei Servi in Siena, 1899. The window designs were created by Alessandro Franchi and Giuseppe Catani. This detail shows St. Sabinus and St. Victor.

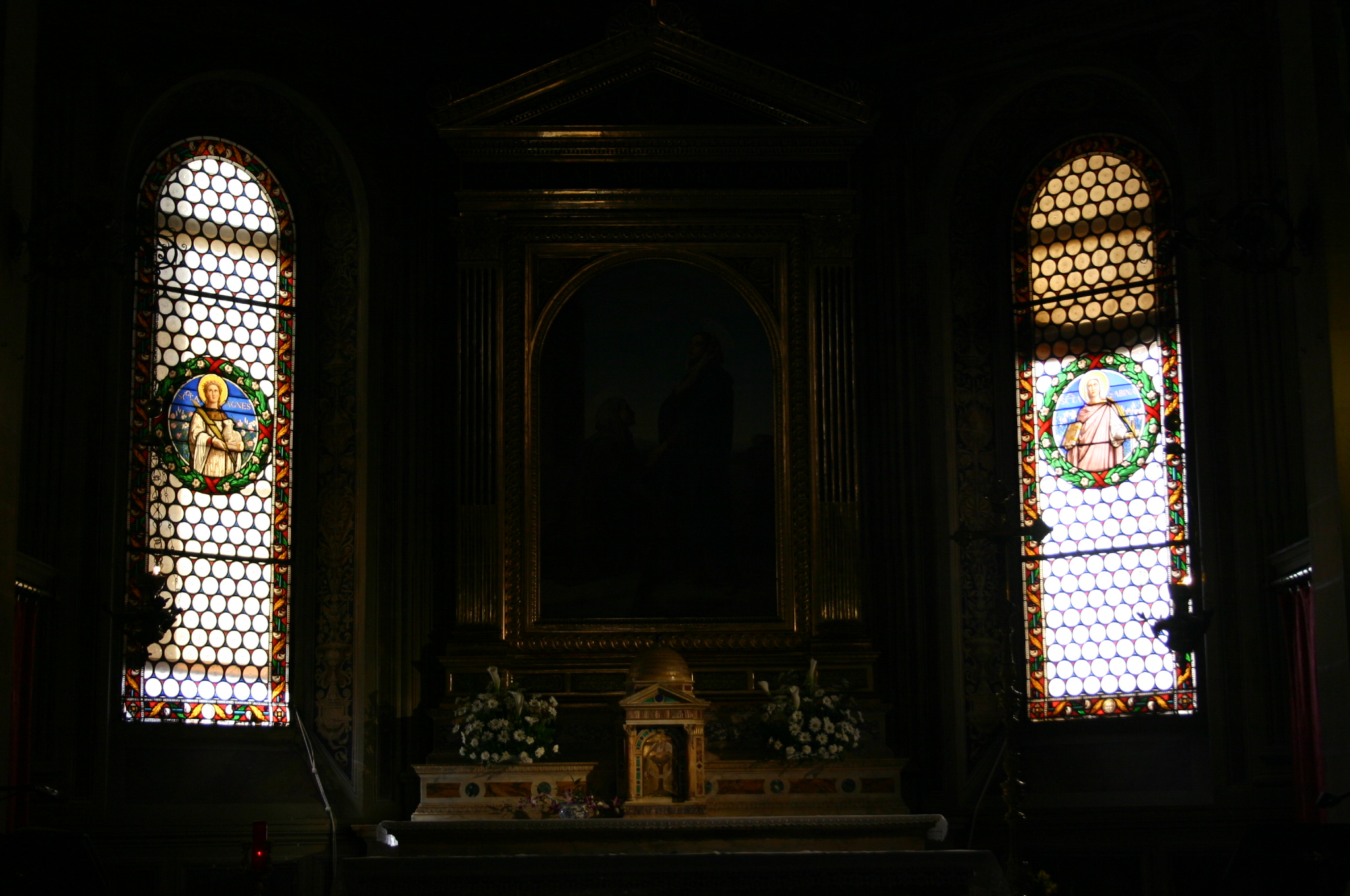
Church of St. Elizabeth of the Visitation, Siena, altar area, with two stained-glass windows created by Ulisse De Matteis, 1896–1901.

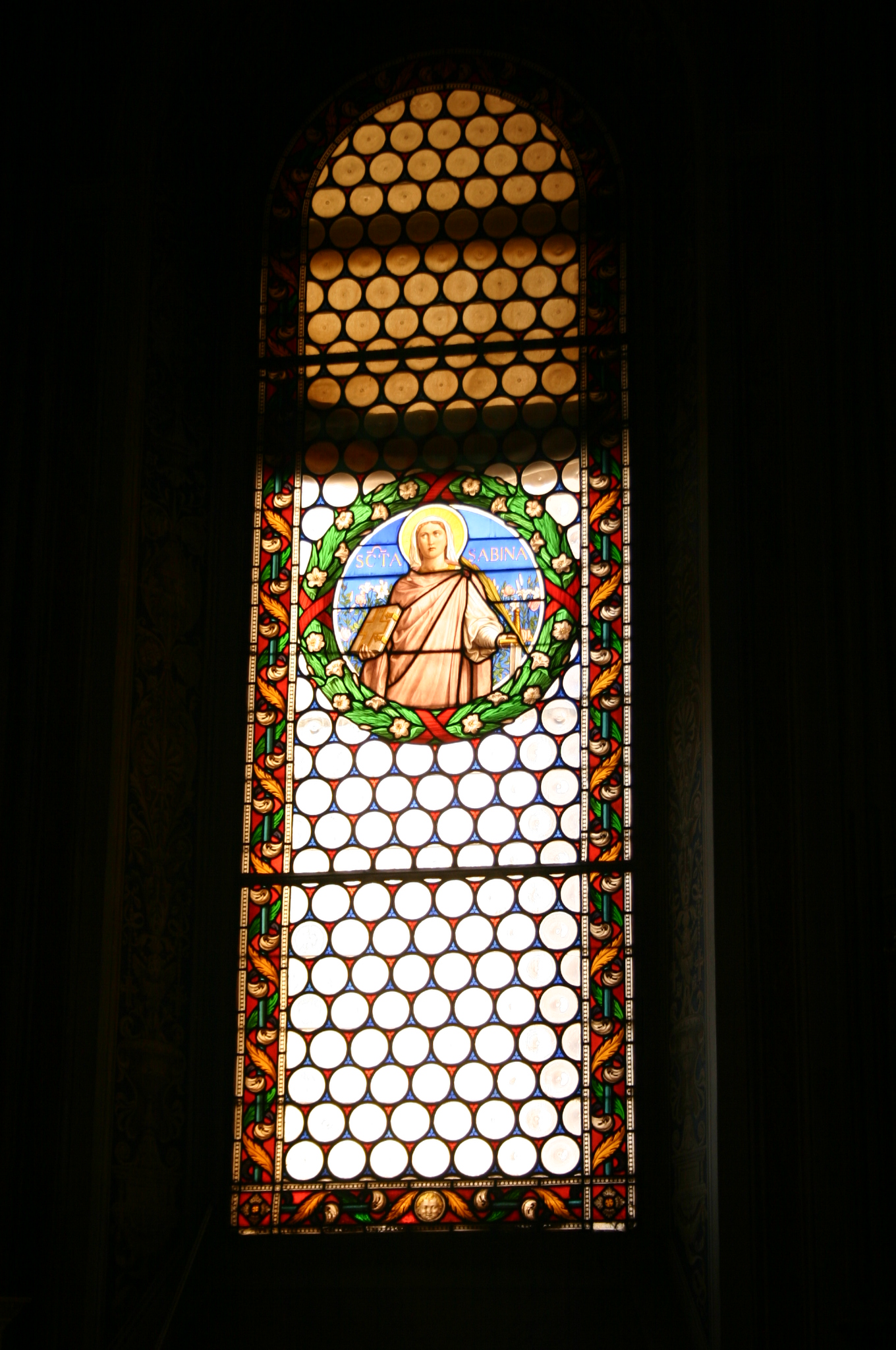
Ulisse De Matteis, stained-glass window with St. Sabina, from the church of St. Elizabeth of the Visitation, Siena, 1896–1901.

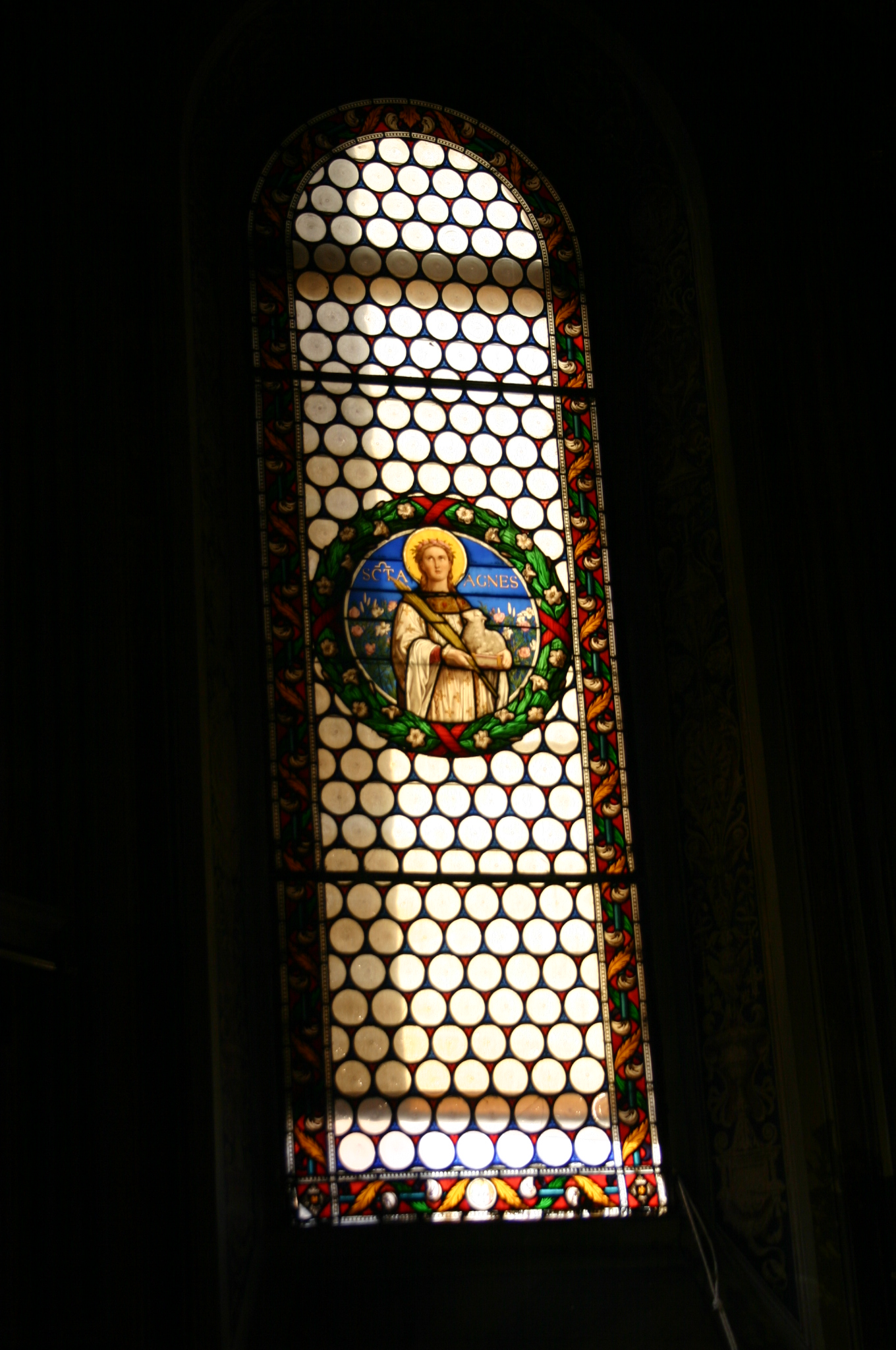
Ulisse De Matteis, stained-glass window with St. Agnes, from the church of St. Elizabeth of the Visitation, Siena, 1874.

== Commissions 1903-1908, Sergio and Ulisse De Matteis ==
- Genoa, Mackenzie Castle chapel windows, 1903. The lancet windows depicting Saints Michael and Liberamus in the chapel of the Mackenzie Castle are likely the earliest windows signed by Sergio and Ulisse De Matteis, indicating that the father and son were officially collaborating by this date, when Sergio was 21 years old. The 1906 catalog lists the commission as "two figural stained-glass windows for the chapel and the windows in the sacristy of the chapel." Scottish insurance broken Evan Mackenzie commissioned Florentine architect Gino Coppedè to build the castle from 1893 to 1905.
- Albaro (near Genoa), San Francesco d'Albaro, 1904. San Francesco d'Albaro. Genova. The 1906 De Matteis catalog reports that the firm made 29 windows with figures for the church, commissioned by Carlo Marcello Bombrini and another two windows with allegorical decoration for the sacristy of the church, commissioned by the Marchesa Carrega. Most of these windows remain in the church. The windows in the sacristy contain the inscriptions "Ulisse e Sergio De Matteis fecero" (Ulisse and Sergio De Matteis created)" and "Firenze 1904" (Florence, 1904). The windows in the facade depict St. Bonaventure, the Assumption of the Virgin, and St. Anthony of Padua. The clerestory and side aisle windows depict numerous saints, including Matthew, Timothy, Anna, Michael, Simon, Anthony, and Francis. The Virgin Mary is also featured in several windows.
- Genoa, Mackenzie Castle stairwell windows, 1906. These windows are light in palette and allow the stairwell to be flooded with light. They are inscribed: DE MATTEIS FIRENZE 1906.
- Pisa, Cathedral, 1906. The stained-glass window depicting St. Joseph holding the Christ child, located on the left side of the high altar chapel in Pisa Cathedral, is signed Ulisse e Sergio De Matteis, Firenze (Florence) and dated 1906, though the window is not included in the 1906 catalog.
- Siena, San Niccolò del Carmine, 1906–07. Sergio and Ulisse created many windows for the church, including a splendid image of the Virgin and Child enthroned in the altar area, a large circular window over the apse containing an image of Christ the Redeemer surrounded by the Four Evangelists, and several bull's eye glass windows with decorative elements and coats of arms in other parts of the church. Two side windows contain the arms of Leopoldo Bufalini and Gaspero Olmi, both benefactors of the church. The De Matteis windows were installed as part of a restoration of the church, which was funded by the Monte dei Paschi bank of Siena. Vittorio Mariani was the lead architect on the restoration. The church was reopened for worship on July 14, 1907.
- Arezzo, San Giovanni Fuorcivitas, 1908. The De Matteis firm's 1915 catalog reports that they created all of the historiated windows in the church. An article from 1907 on the church reports that a window was made for the church by Ulisse and Sergio De Matteis, based on fragments of windows by Niccolò di Piero Tedesco found during an excavation. The first four windows in the nave on the left are signed and dated 1908.

=== Gallery of work 1903-1908 ===
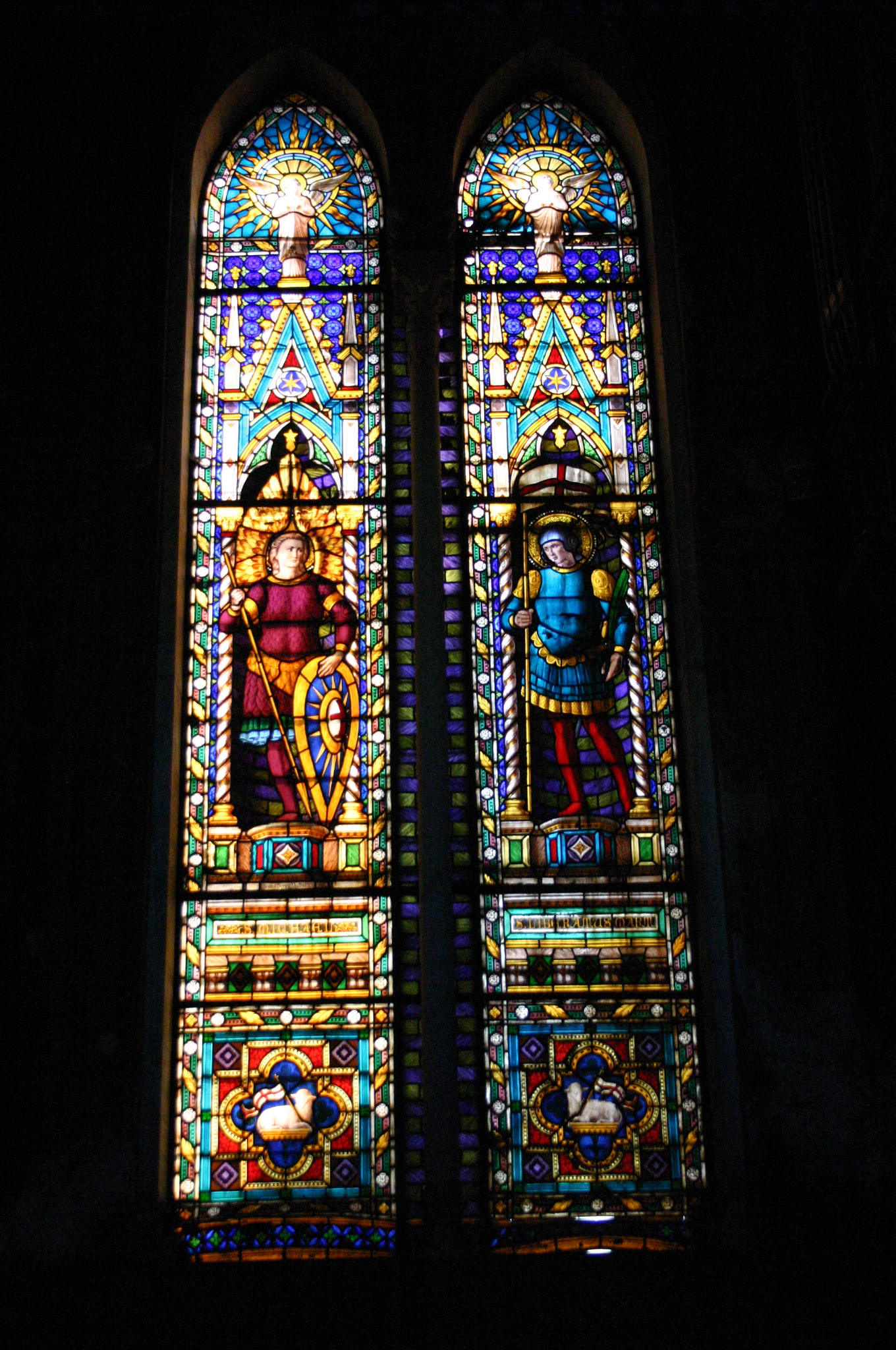
Ulisse and Sergio De Matteis, stained-glass window depicting saints Michael and Liberamus, chapel of the Castello Mackenzie, signed and dated 1903.

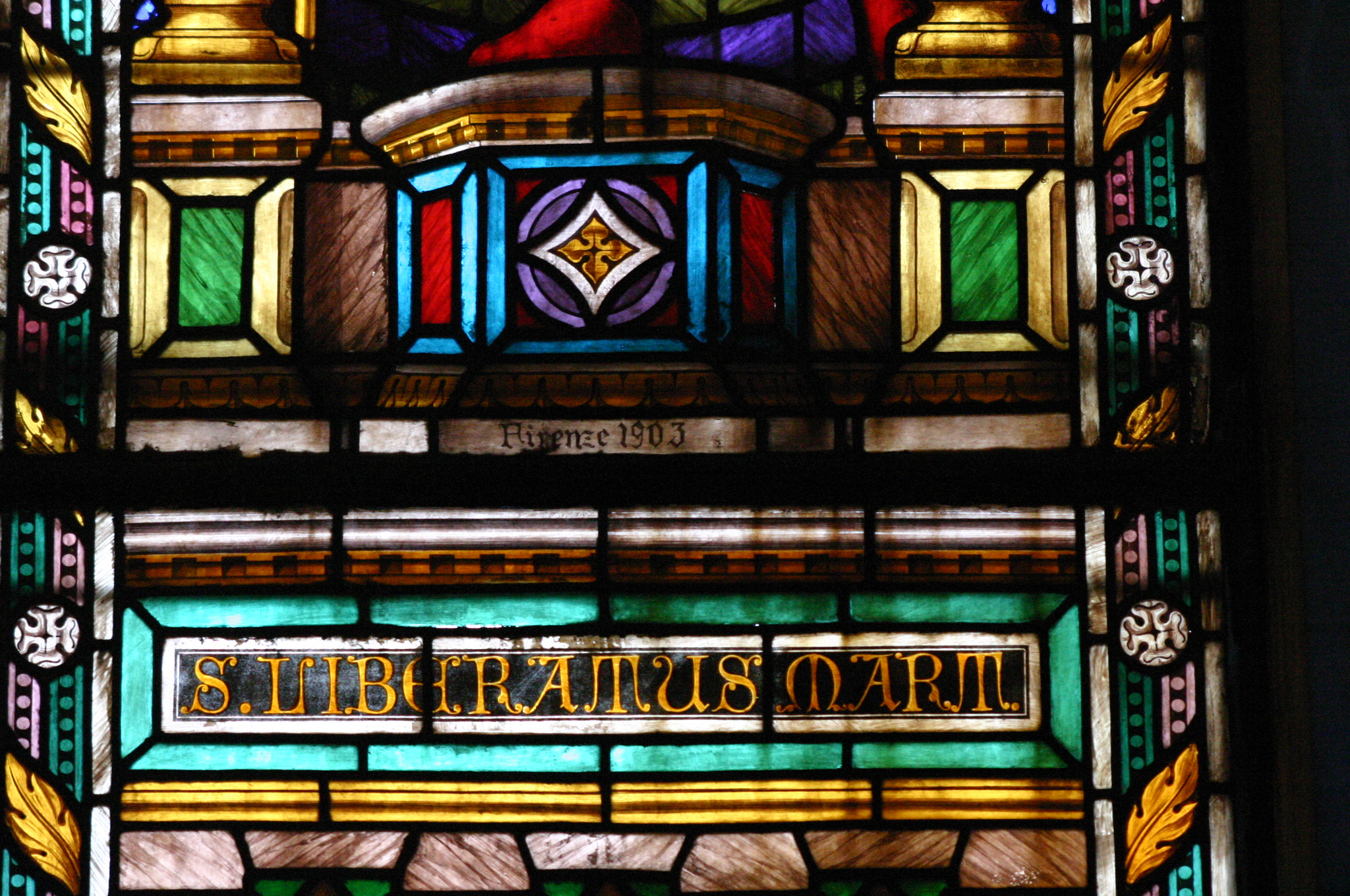
Ulisse and Sergio De Matteis, detail (with date) of the stained-glass window in the chapel of the Castello Mackenzie, Genoa. 1903.

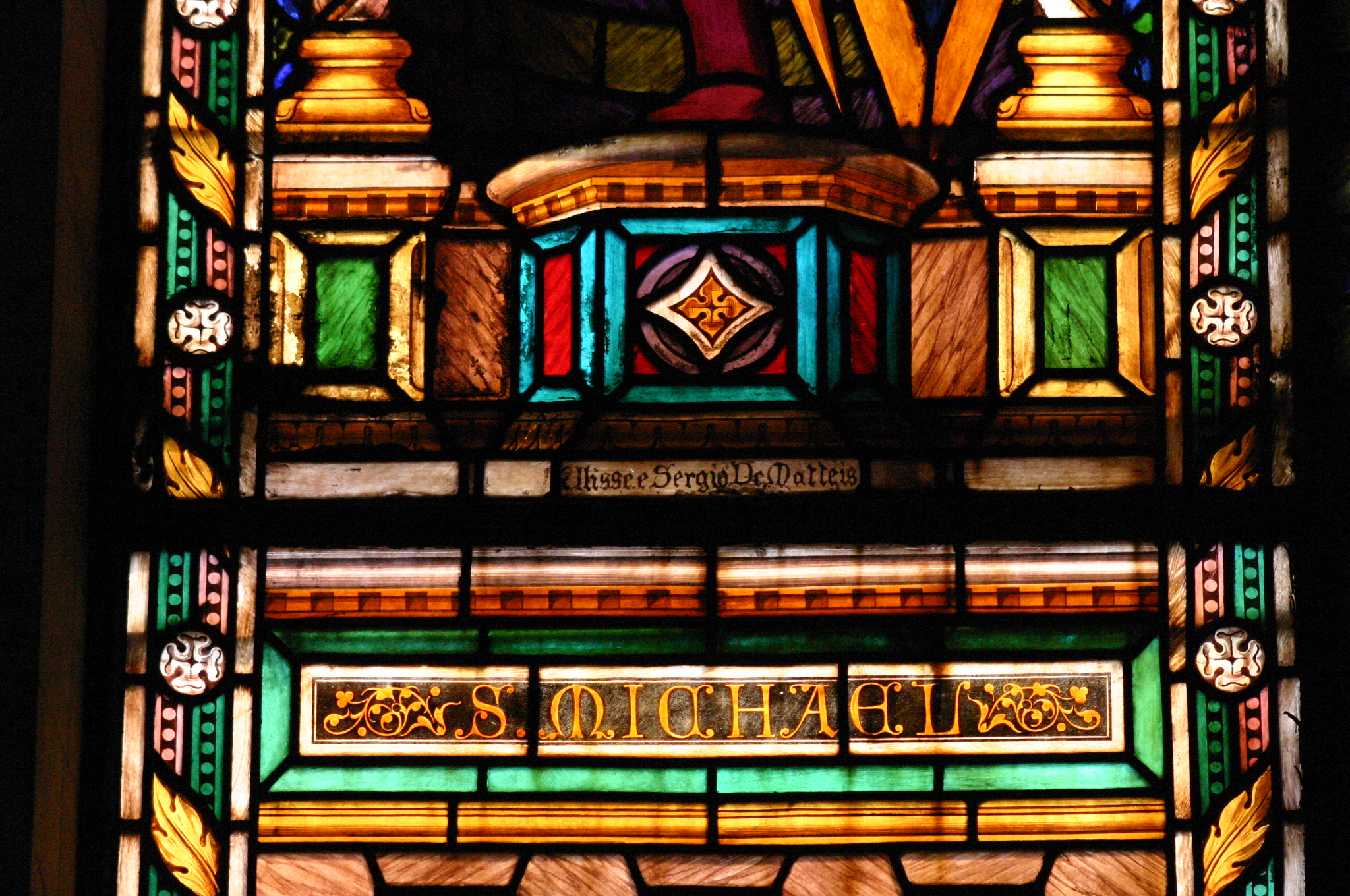
Ulisse and Sergio De Matteis, detail (with signature) of the stained-glass window in the chapel of the Castello Mackenzie, Genoa. 1903.

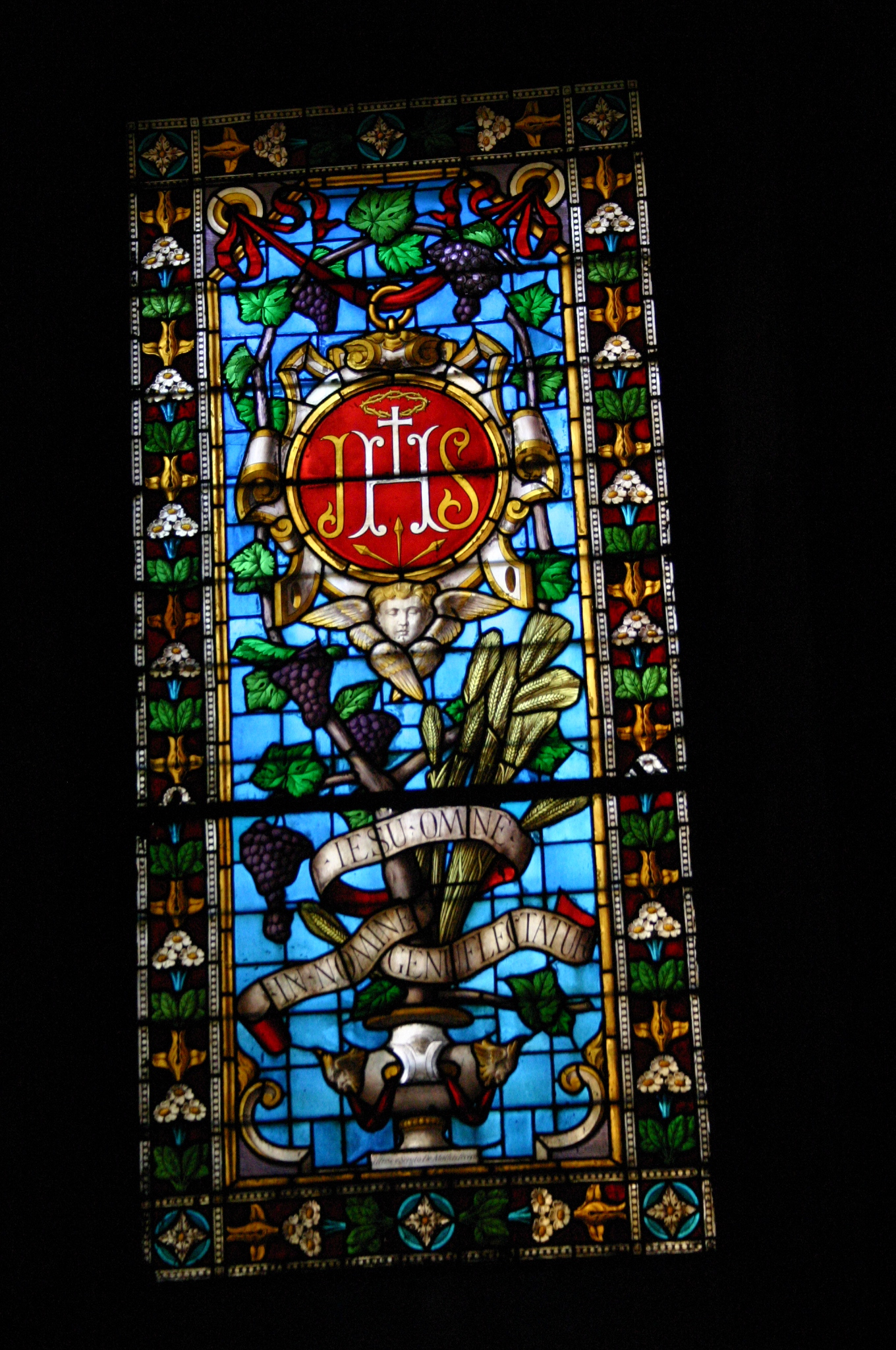
Sergio and Ulisse De Matteis, stained-glass window in the sacristy of San Francesco d'Albaro, 1904.

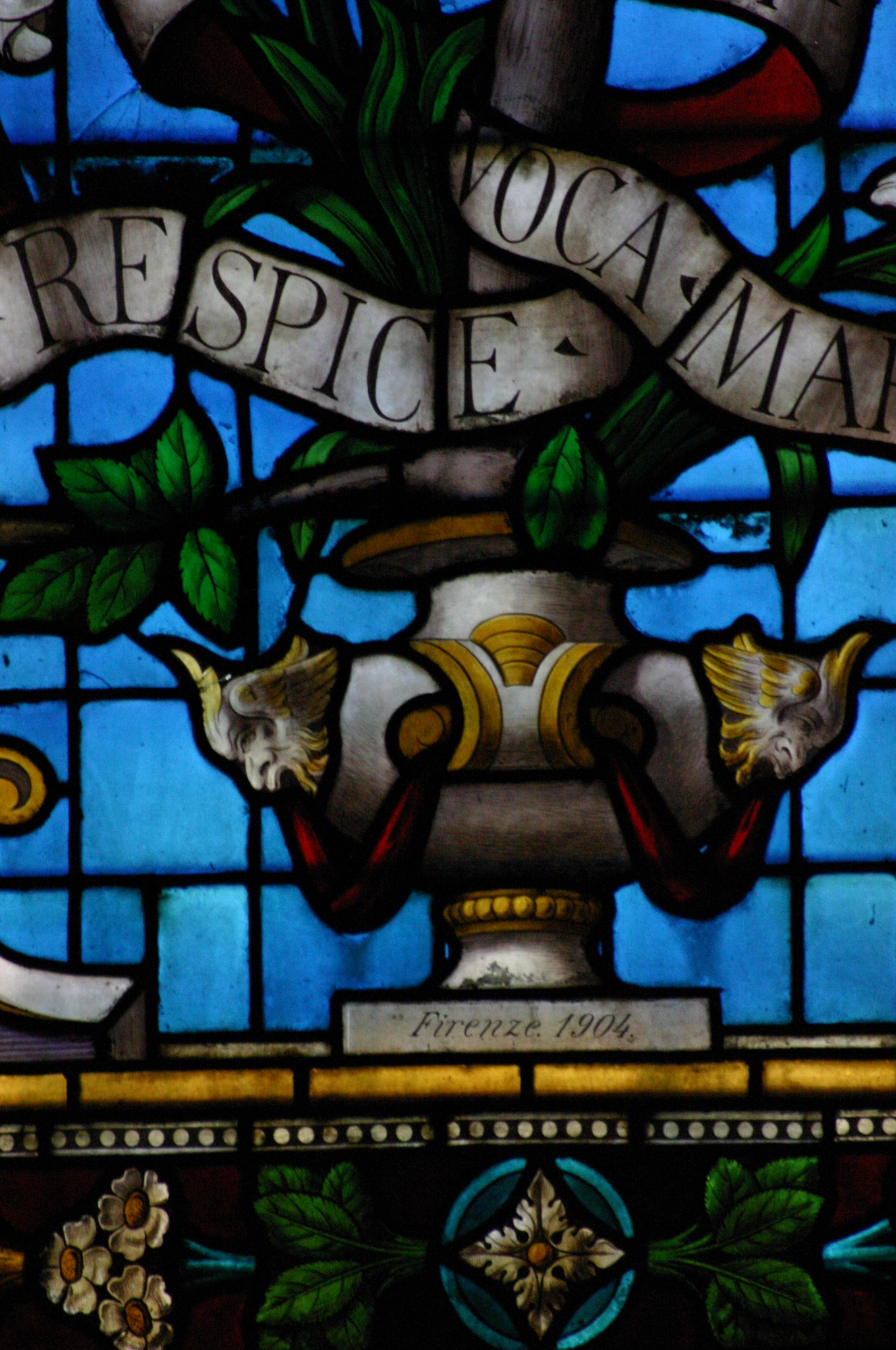
Detail of De Matteis stained-glass window in the sacristy of San Francesco d'Albaro showing date, 1904.

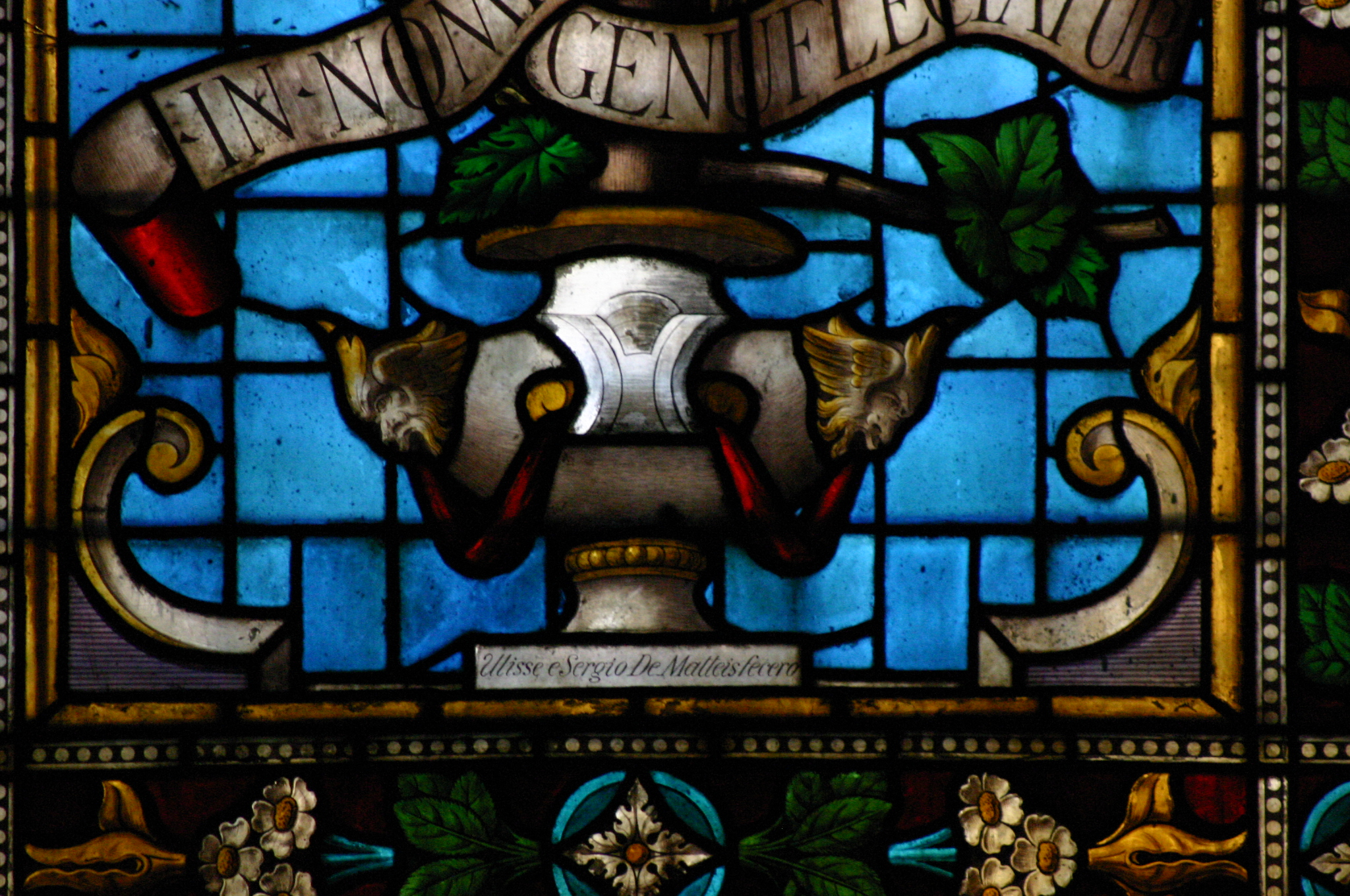
Detail of De Matteis signature on a stained-glass window in the sacristy of San Francesco d'Albaro, 1904.

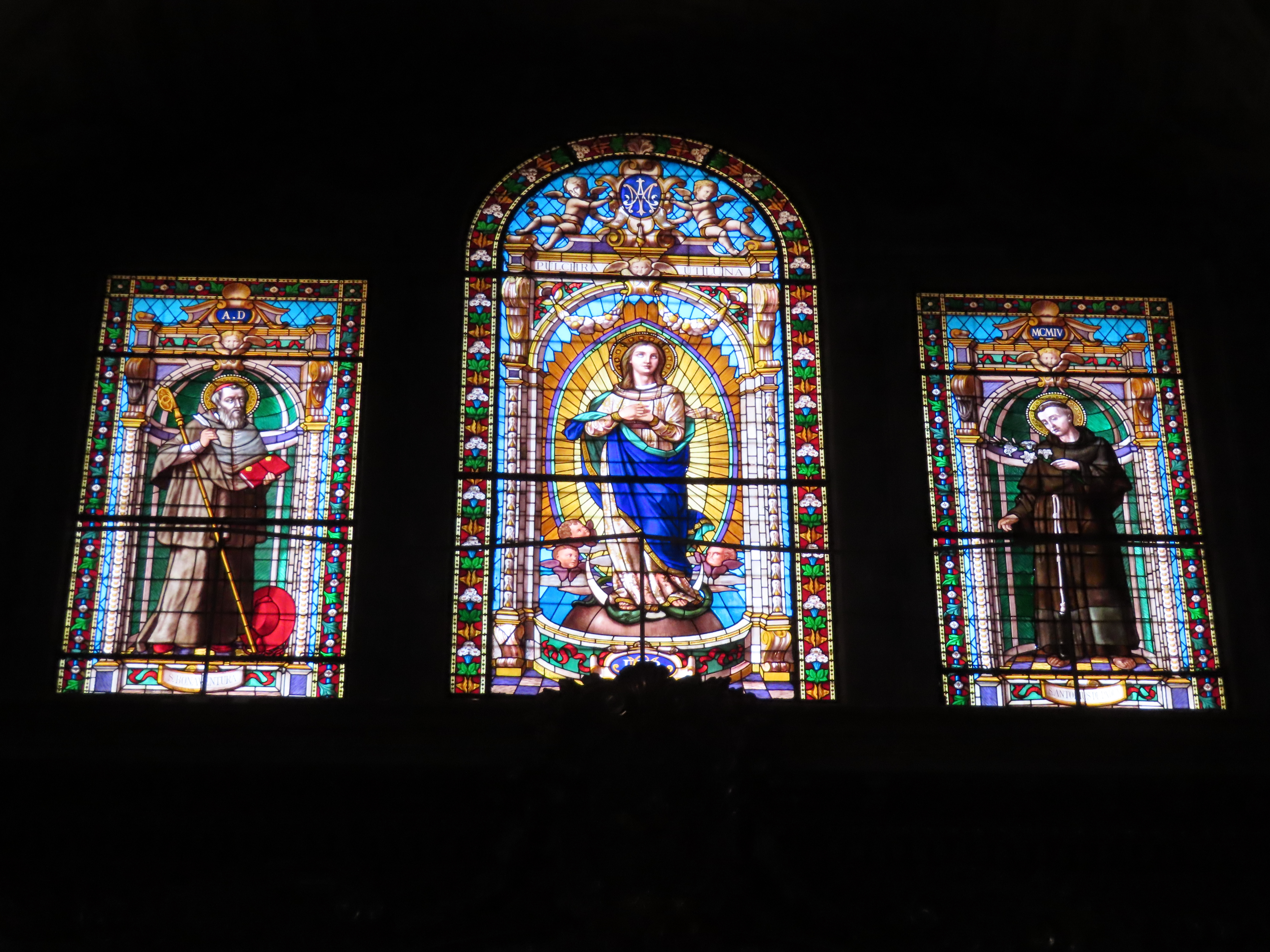
Sergio and Ulisse De Matteis, stained-glass windows depicting St. Bonaventure, the Assumption of the Virgin, and St. Anthony of Padua, from the facade of San Francesco d'Albaro, near Genoa, 1904.

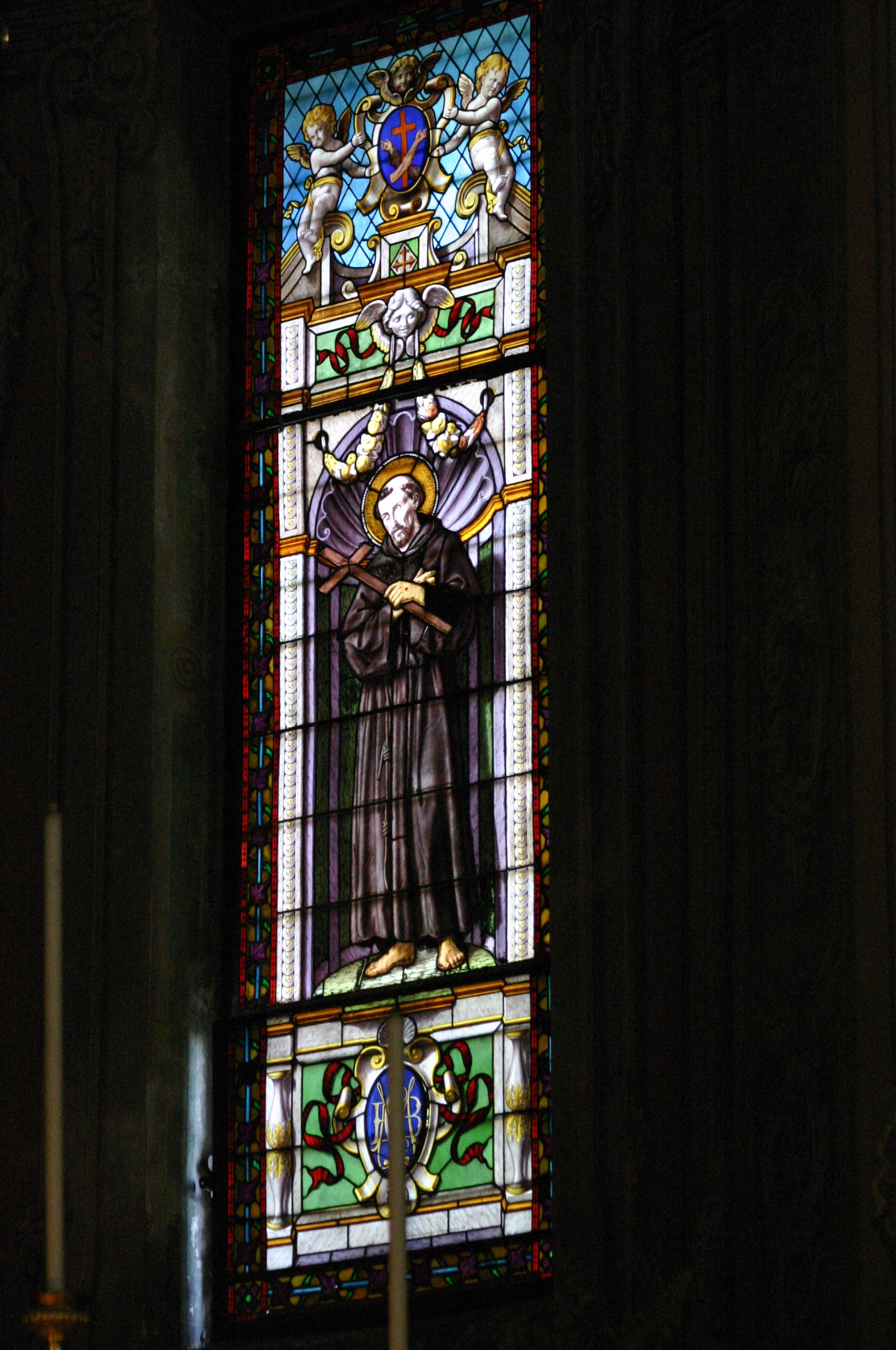
Sergio and Ulisse De Matteis, stained-glass window of St. Francis, from the high altar of San Francesco d'Albaro (Genoa), 1904.

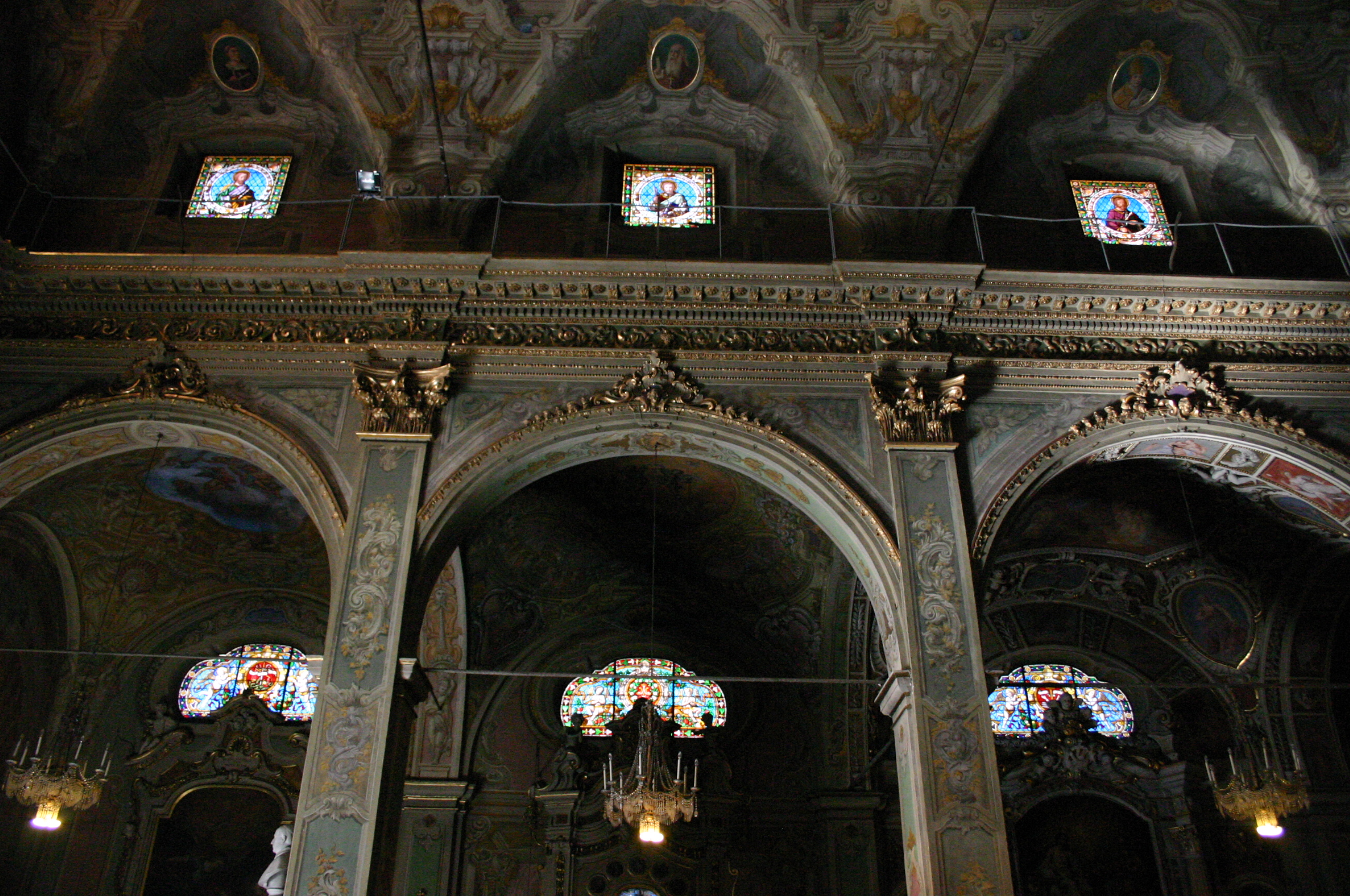
Side aisle chapels and clerestory, San Francesco d'Albaro (Genova), showing stained glass windows by Ulisse and Sergio De Matteis, 1904.

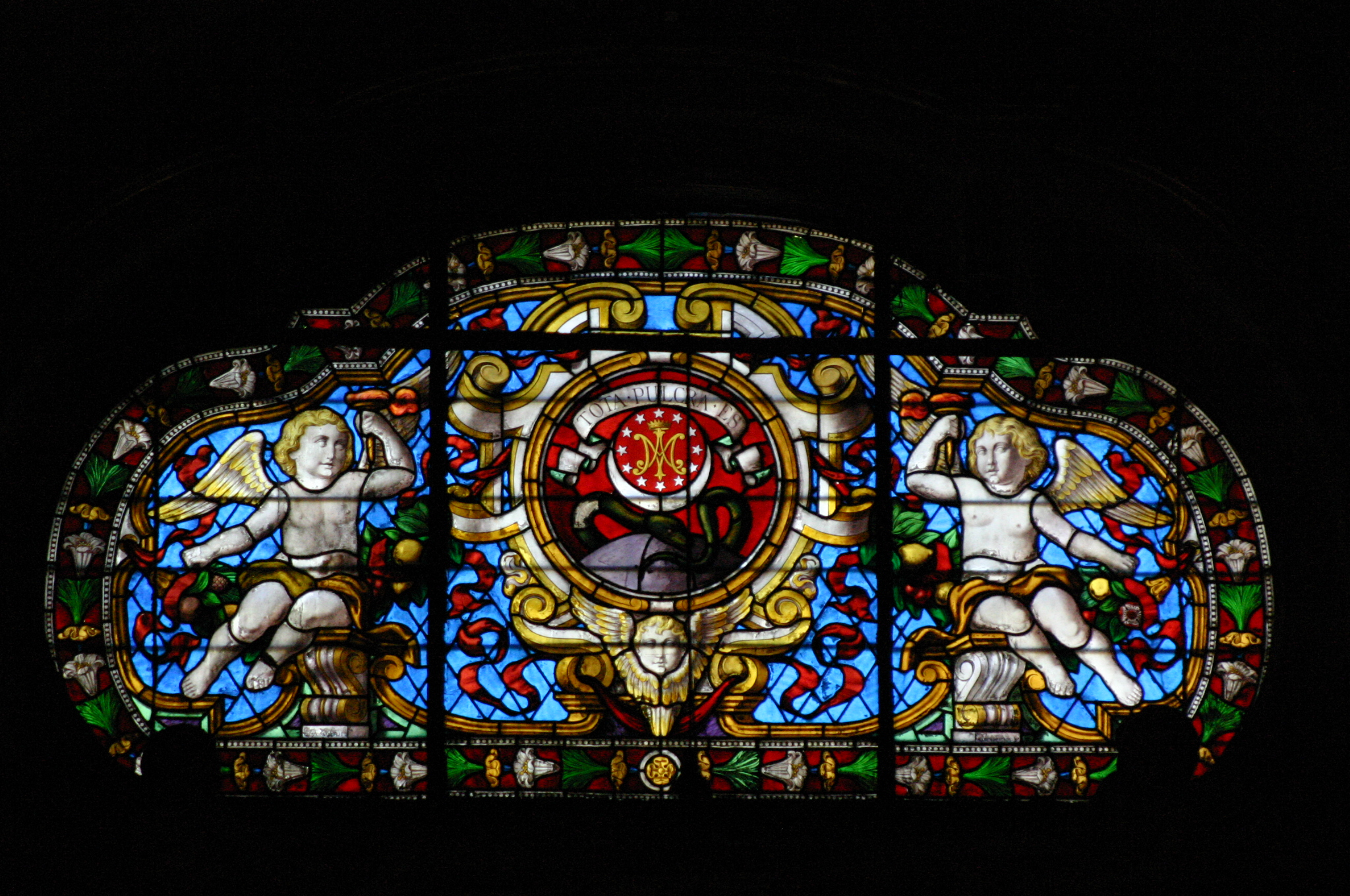
Ulisse and Sergio De Matteis, Stained-glass window from a side aisle chapel in the church of San Francesco d'Albaro (Genoa), 1904.

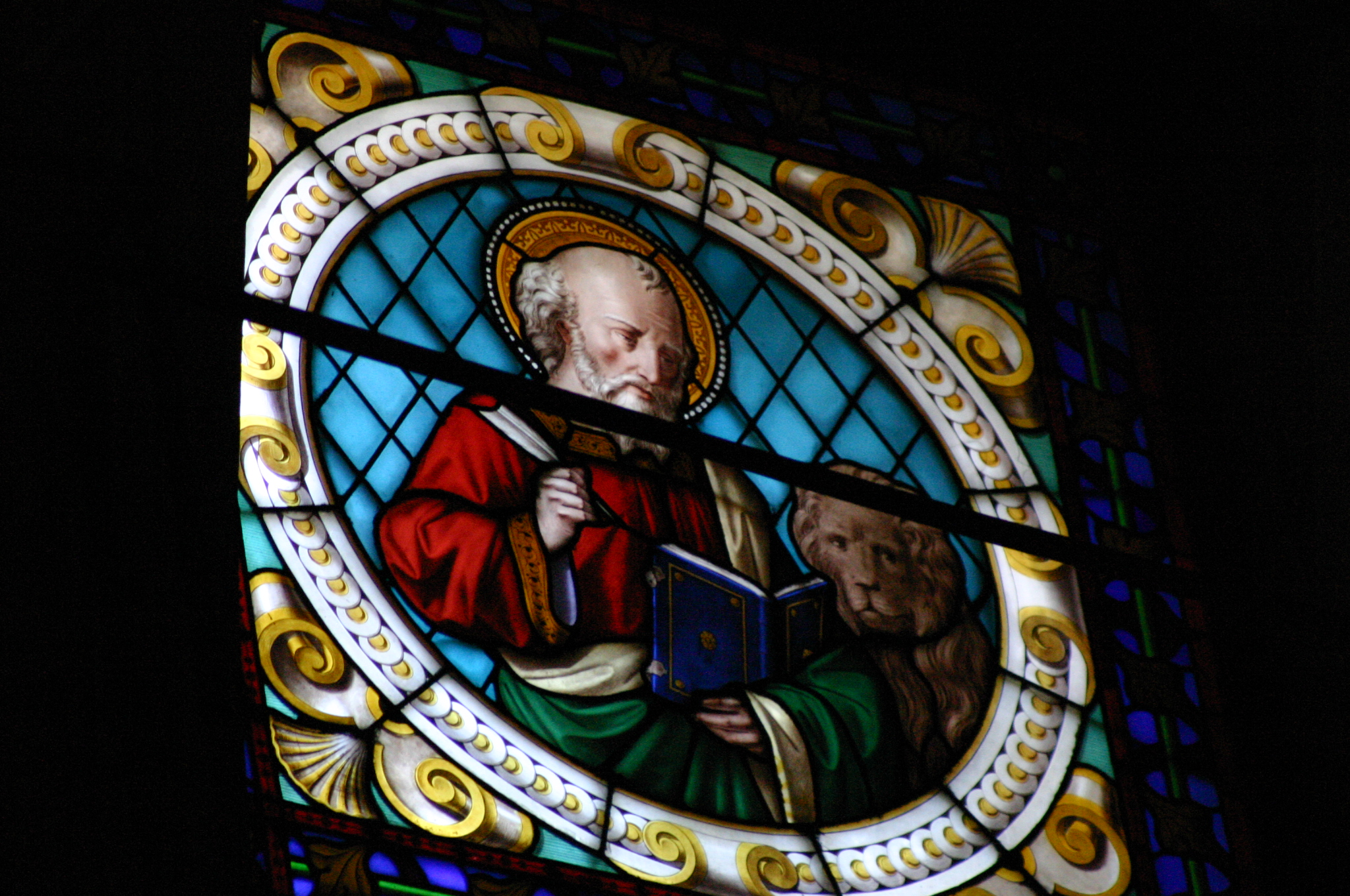
Sergio and Ulisse De Matteis, stained-glass window of St. Mark, from the clerestory of San Francesco d'Albaro (Genoa), 1904.

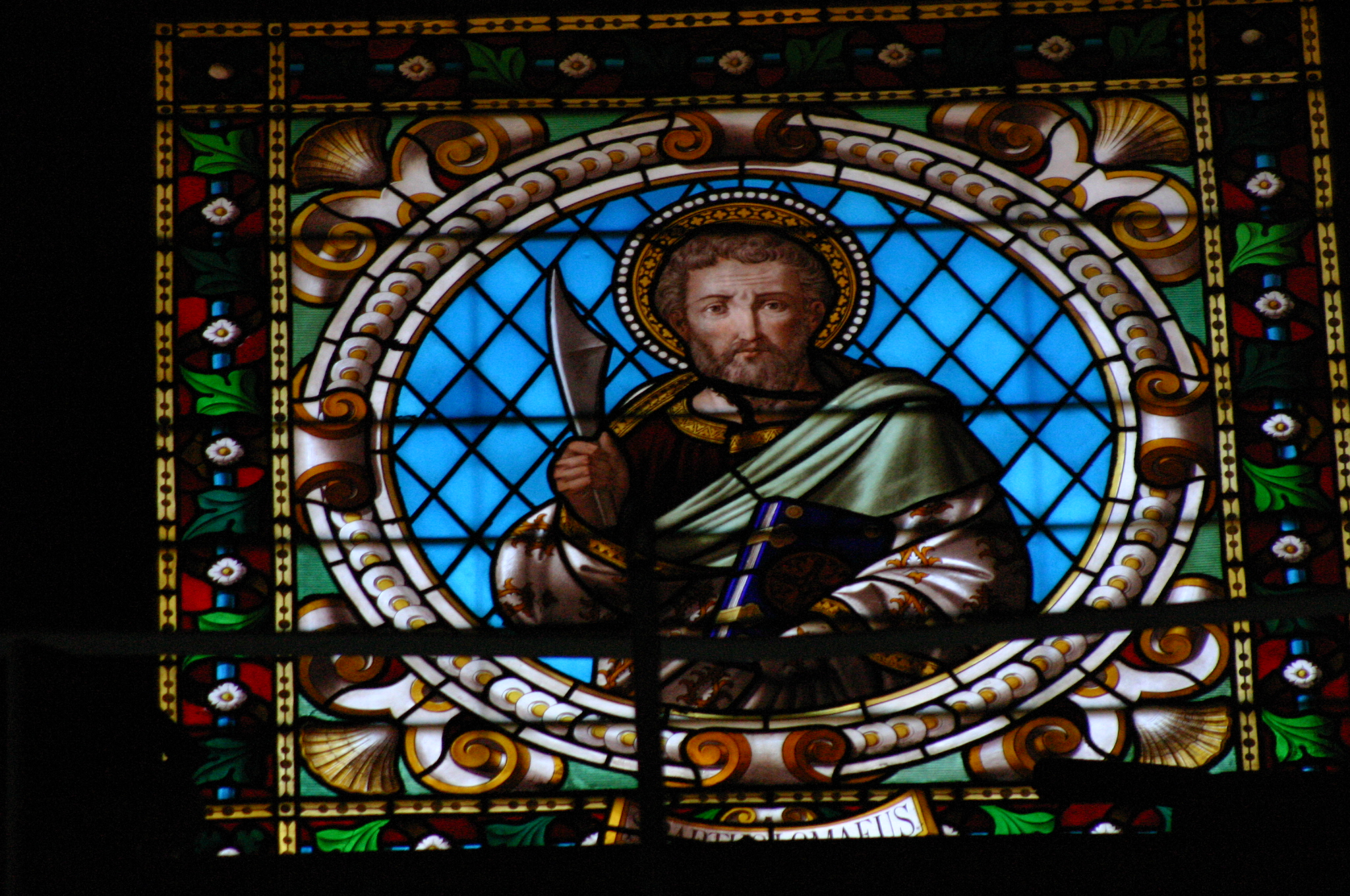
Sergio and Ulisse De Matteis, stained-glass window of St. Bartholomew, from the clerestory of San Francesco d'Albaro (Genoa), 1904.

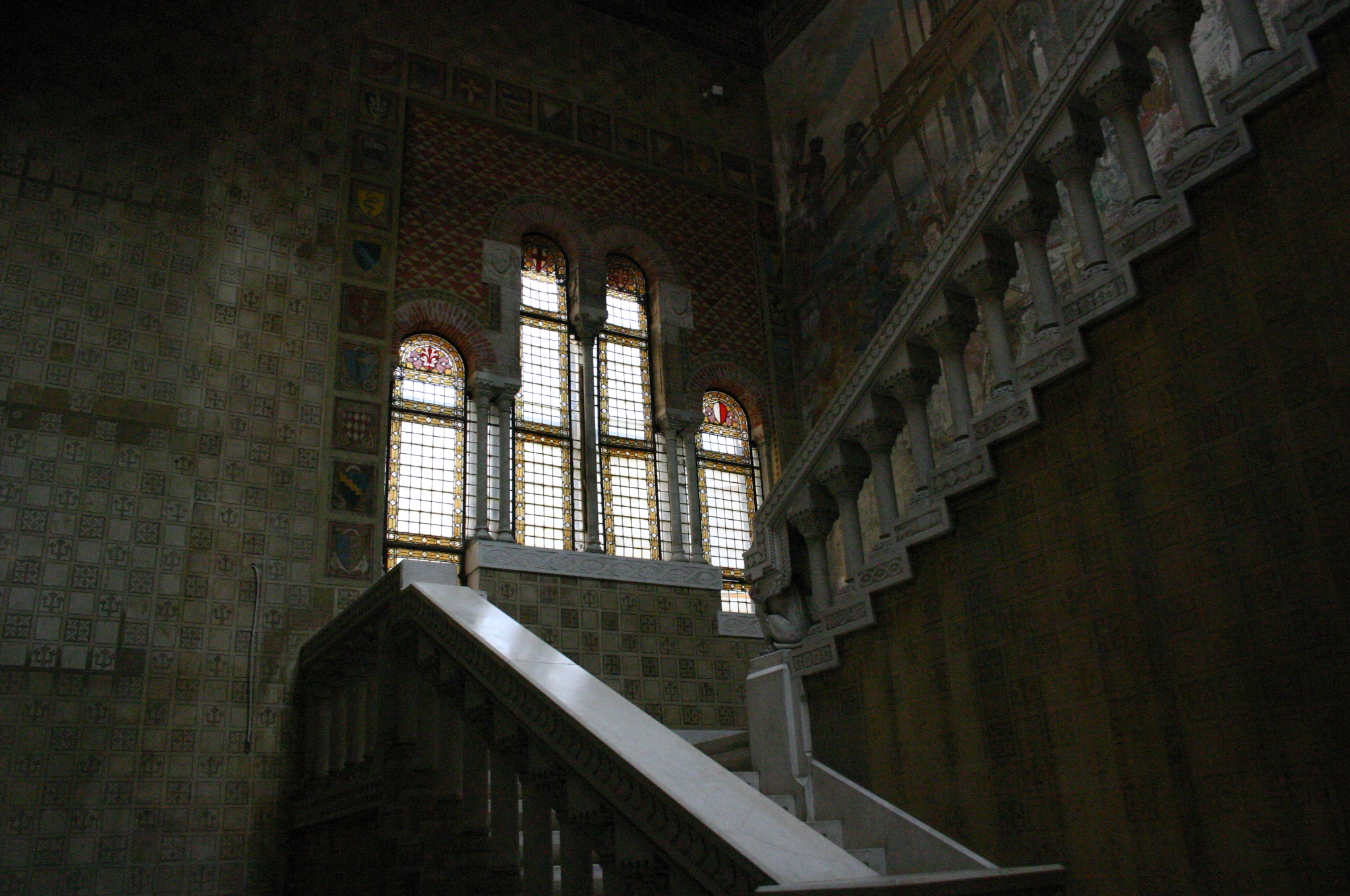
De Matteis, Stained-glass window in the Castello Mackenzie, Genoa, Italy. 1906.

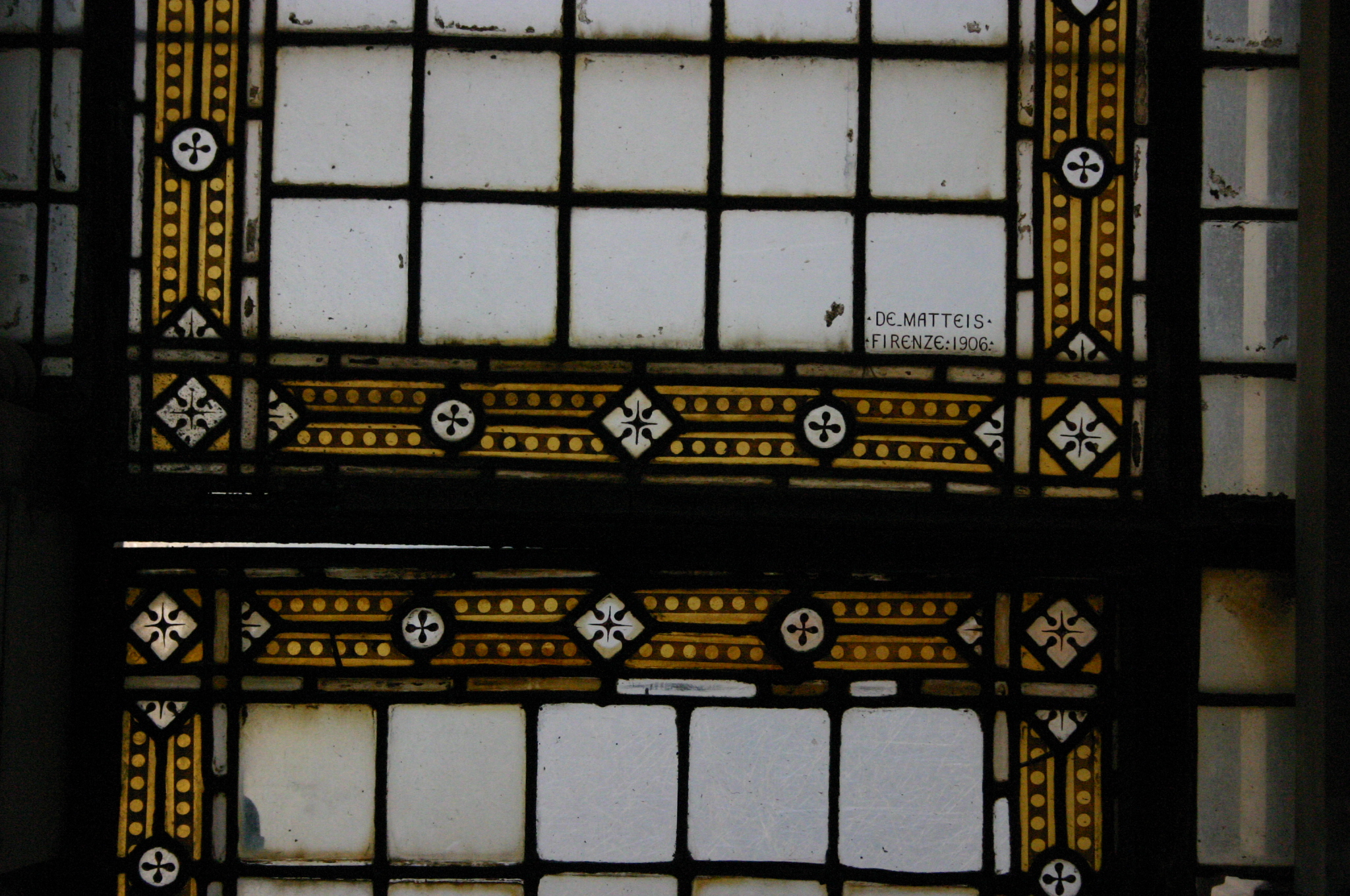
De Matteis, signature and date on a stained-glass window in the Castello Mackenzie, Genoa, Italy. 1906.

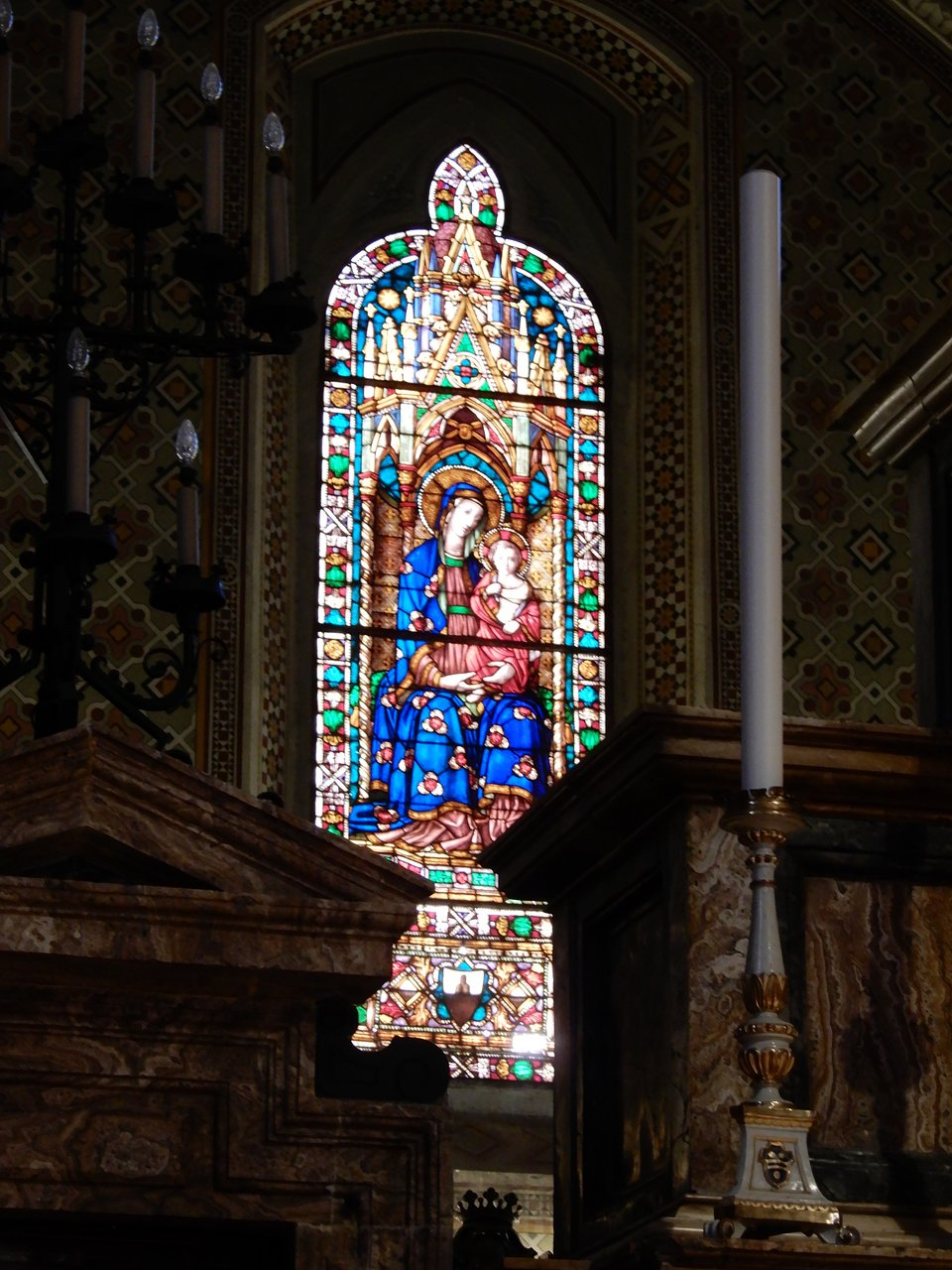
Ulisse and Sergio De Matteis, Stained-glass window of the Virgin and Child Enthroned, Church of San Niccolò del Carmine, Siena, 1906.

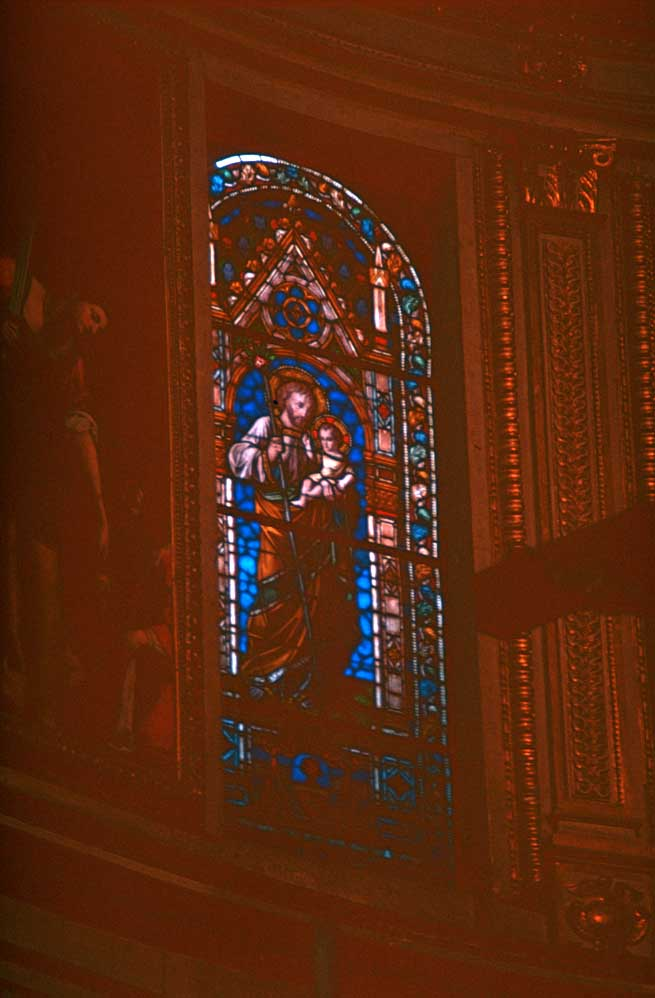
Ulisse and Sergio De Matteis, St. Joseph(?) holding the Christ Child, Pisa Cathedral, ca. 1907.

== Frequent Artistic Collaborators ==
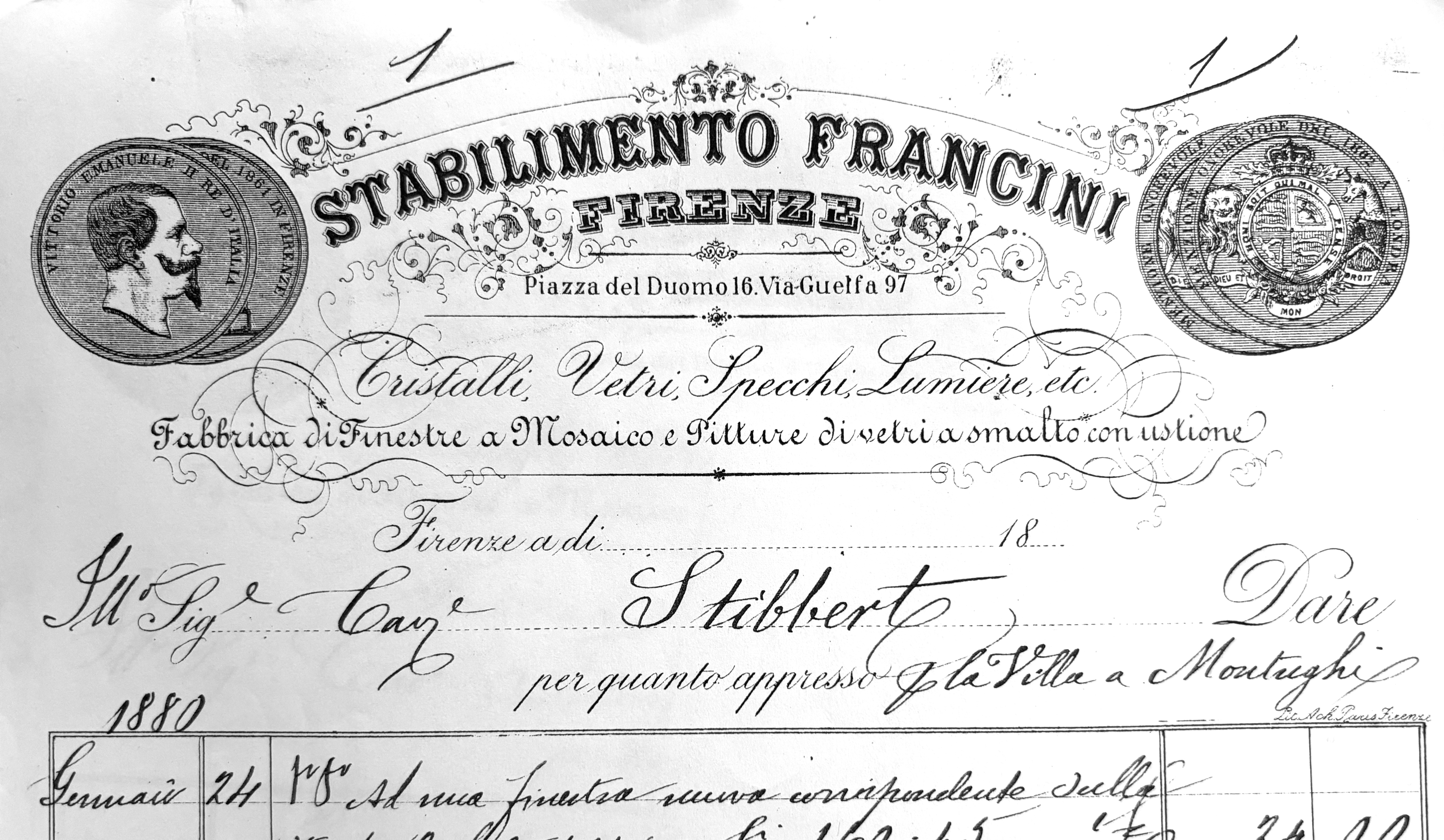
- Copy of a bill sent by the Francini Glass Company to Frederick Stibbert in 1880.
  Giuseppe and Carlo Francini (brothers). The Francini company, in existence since at least 1845, helped De Matteis found his stained-glass company in 1859 by providing capital. According to Antonio Pavan, Giuseppe Francini ran a successful company in San Giovanni Valdarno that produced tableware and employed more than 60 people. The Francini company also had a glass shop in the center of Florence, which supplied glass for De Matteis' commissions. Many of the earliest commissions that De Matteis received are credited to the Francini company; for example, the window of the Assumption of the Virgin created for San Miniato (al Tedesco) Cathedral is credited to G. Francini in the catalog of the 1861 Florence exhibition, where it won a prize. The collaboration between De Matteis and Francini likely lasted until around 1905, when the Francini company seems to have closed shop--by 1905, it's no longer listed in Indicatore generale della città e provincia di Firenze.
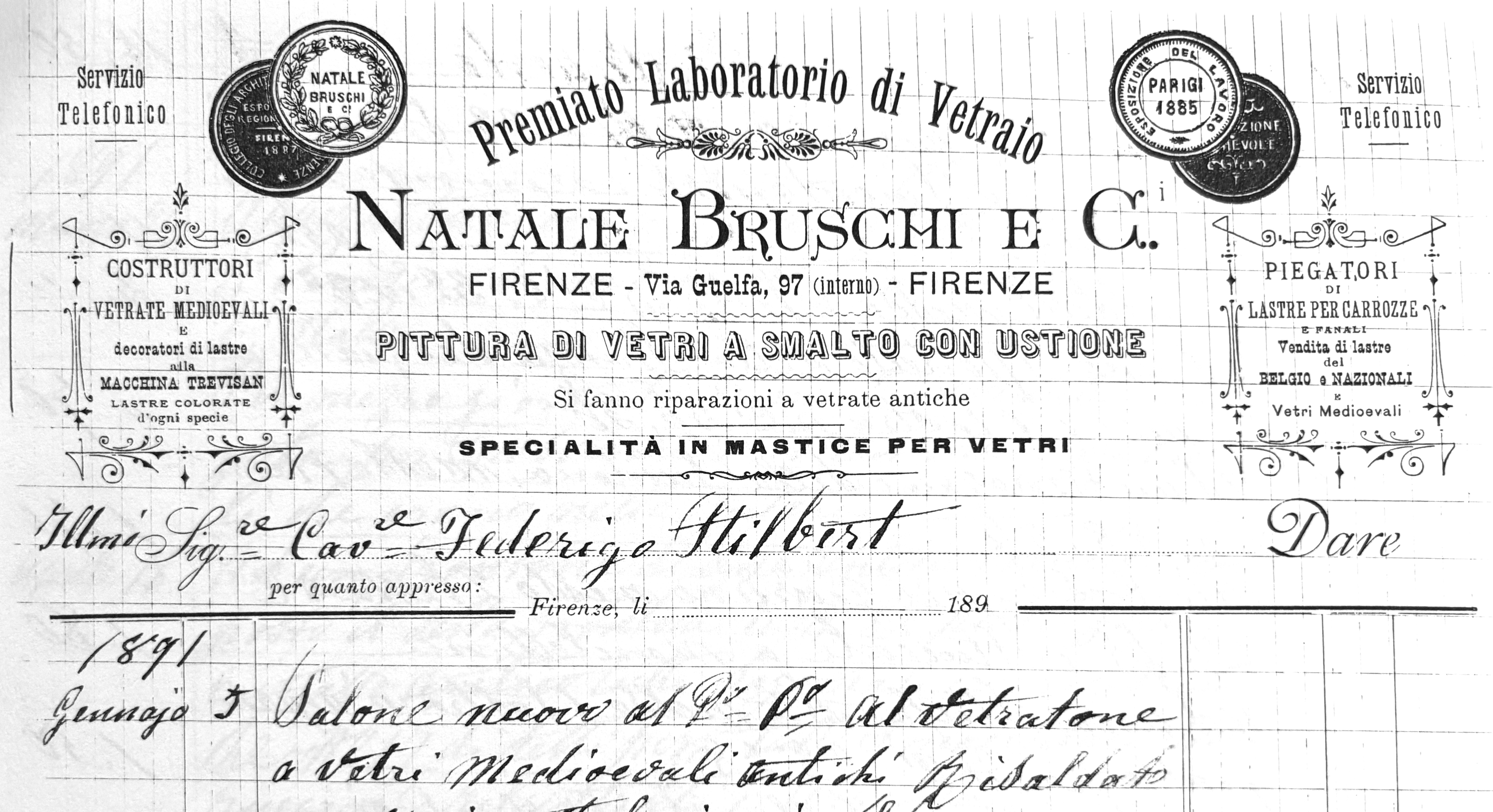
- Copy of a bill sent by Natale Bruschi to Frederick Stibbert in 1891.
  Natale Bruschi. From the beginning of his career, De Matteis also collaborated regularly with the glazier Natale Bruschi. Throughout their collaboration, which lasted well into the 1880s, Bruschi fabricated the windows according to De Matteis’ designs, and De Matteis then painted the glass with enameled pigments—a process that followed the practices of medieval stained-glass artists. For example, the documents in the archives of the San Miniato (al Tedesco) Cathedral note that while the painting of the stained-glass window was entrusted to Ulisse De Matteis, the glasswork was carried out by Natale Bruschi. Several of De Matteis' most important commissions contain both his and Natale Bruschi's signature, including the windows in the Spinelli-Sloane and Giucciardini chapels in Santa Croce, the Castello Brolio chapel, San Michele in Foro in Lucca, Prato Cathedral, and St. Mary's in Lastingham. Documents show that Natale Bruschi also worked with De Matteis on the windows in San Michele in Visdomini in Florence and that the two artists were involved in the same projects well into the 1890s. The Antica Officina del Vetro Bruschi was revived in 1995 and is still in operation today in Florence.
- Gaetano Bianchi (1819–92). According to the early history of the firm, the famed painter-restorer Gaetano Bianchi encouraged Ulisse De Matteis to pursue the art of stained glass. The two artists were part of the same circle and were likely friends. Bianchi and De Matteis both worked on the restoration of the Bargello in the late 1850s and 60s, at San Miniato (al Tedesco) Cathedral in the 1860s, at Santa Croce (Florence) throughout the 1860s, and at the Palazzo Medici-Riccardi in the 1870s, at the Castle of Vincigliata in the 1870s, and at the Stibbert Museum in the 1880s.
- Pietro Pezzati (1828–1890). De Matteis created several windows for Prato, Cathedral in the early 1870s that were based on the painter Pezzati's designs.
- Alessandro Franchi (1838–1914). During the restoration of the church of Santa Maria dei Servi in Siena, De Matteis created windows for that apse of the church that were based on Franchi's designs. Franchi and De Matteis may have also worked together on the restoration of the Oratory of St. Catherine in Siena, where De Matteis created windows and Franchi oversaw the restoration process in the later 1890s.
- Giuseppe Partini (1842–95). In the 1880s and 1890s, De Matteis and Partini collaborated regularly on the restoration of Siena Cathedral and the Concattedrale di San Secondiano in Chiusi. Bringing light into the interior of medieval churches was an important goal for Partini.
- Veronica Vespini degli Innocenti De Matteis (1854–1910). Veronica was Ulisse's second wife, stepmother to Elettra, and mother of Eva, Sergio, Rita, and Maria. She was an artist, a painter, when she met Ulisse, and she continued to make her own work and collaborate with Ulisse in the stained-glass workshop after they married in 1875. Veronica's youngest daughter Maria reported that her mother was a miniature painter, who even made miniature paintings for the czars. Veronica's name is signed on the De Matteis firm's correspondence with several patrons beginning in the 1880s; Siena Cathedral and the Stibbert Museum both have letters signed by Veronica in their archives. Like Elettra, Veronica also entered work into exhibitions. In the 1887 Tuscan Regional Exhibition of Construction Materials. she showed a stained-glass window containing a bust of the Angel of God. While the index of the 1889 Roman Exhibition of Ceramic and Glass Arts lists the initials of Elettra, Ulisse, and Veronica, the work submitted by the firm is all credited to Veronica De Matteis. In 1890, She won a silver medal for her stained-glass windows in the National Women's Exhibition in Florence (Esposizione Beatrice di Firenze. Mostra nazionale de' lavori femminili in Firenze).
- Elettra Italia Isolina De Matteis (1861–1932). Elettra was the only surviving child from Ulisse's first marriage, and she grew up collaborating with her father and her stepmother Veronica in the studio. She was also an accomplished painter, who apparently made and sold copies of Renaissance paintings. While her work on the firm's public commissions isn't documented (though she was likely an integral part of the workshop), her name is listed in exhibition records. In the 1887 Tuscan Regional Exhibition of Construction Materials, Decorations and Finishing Works, the De Matteis firm showed, among other work, was a medieval style stained-glass window containing a representation of St. George, carried out by Elettra De Matteis. The index of an 1889 Exhibition of Ceramic and Glass Arts in Rome includes the name De Matteis, followed by the initials E, U, and V, which most likely refers to Elettra, Ulisse, and Veronica De Matteis. At the 1890 National Women's Exhibition in Florence (Esposizione Beatrice di Firenze. Mostra nazionale de' lavori femminili in Firenze), Elettra won two silver medals for her work in oil, pastel, and watercolor and for her stained-glass windows.
- Eva Marzia Luisa De Matteis (1876–1908). Eva was the daughter of Ulisse and Veronica De Matteis and was like most her siblings a painter and a collaborator in the family workshop. Beginning in about 1904, Eva co-directed the workshop with her brother Sergio (although correspondence is signed only from Sergio and Ulisse) until her untimely death in 1908.
- Sergio Ettore De Matteis (1882–1907). Sergio was the son of Ulisse and Veronica De Matteis and was like most of his siblings an artist and collaborator in the family workshop. With his sister Eva, Sergio took the helm of the studio in 1904. Before his early death in 1907, he collaborated artistically with his father on several commissions, including the Mackenzie Castle in Genoa (1903 and 1906); the church of San Francesco d'Albaro near Genoa (1904); the church of San Niccolò del Carmine in Siena (1906–07); Pisa Cathedral (1907); and the church of San Giovanni Fuorcivitas in Arezzo (completed 1908).
- Ezio Lorenzo Fabio Giovannozzi (1882–1964). The painter Ezio Giovanozzi married Ulisse and Veronica's daughter Rita Landa De Matteis in 1909. Following the deaths of Sergio and Eva De Matteis, Ezio led the De Matteis workshop with the assistance of the painters Ricciardo Meacci and Arturo Villigiardo. Under Ezio's direction, the firm continued to create stained-glass windows well into the 1920s.

== Bibliography of Sources in English ==
- Silvia Ciappi and Lucia Mannini, La vetrata artistica a Firenze : dal Trecento al Novecento | The Artistic Stained Glass Window in Florence: from the Fourteenth to the Twentieth Century. Florence: Edifir, 2021. Contains text in Italian and English.
- Nancy Thompson, “The Immaculate Conception Window in Santa Croce and the Catholic Revival in Nineteenth-Century Florence,” Nineteenth-Century Art Worldwide 12/1 (Spring 2013).
- Nancy Thompson, “The State of Stained Glass in Nineteenth-Century Italy: Ulisse De Matteis and the vitrail archéologique,” Journal of Glass Studies 52 (2010): 217–31.
- Nancy Thompson, “Reviving the ‘Past Greatness of the Florentine People’: Restoring Medieval Florence in the Nineteenth Century,” in Medieval Art and Architecture After the Middle Ages, eds. Alyce Jordan and Janet Marquart (Cambridge Scholars Press, 2009), pp. 171-94.
- Nancy Thompson, “Stained Glass in Nineteenth-Century Florence: Medieval Reproductions by the Atelier De Matteis,” in Interpreting the Middle Ages: Essays on Medievalism, ed. Susan Ridyard. Sewanee Medieval Studies 13 (2005): 59–81.
- Nancy Thompson, “Architectural Restoration and Stained Glass in Nineteenth-Century Siena: The Place of Light in Giuseppe Partini’s Purismo,” This Year’s Work in Medievalism, ed. Gwendolyn Morgan, XIX (2004): 41–53.
