= Palazzo Spannocchi =

Coordinates: 43.3210°N 11.3308°E

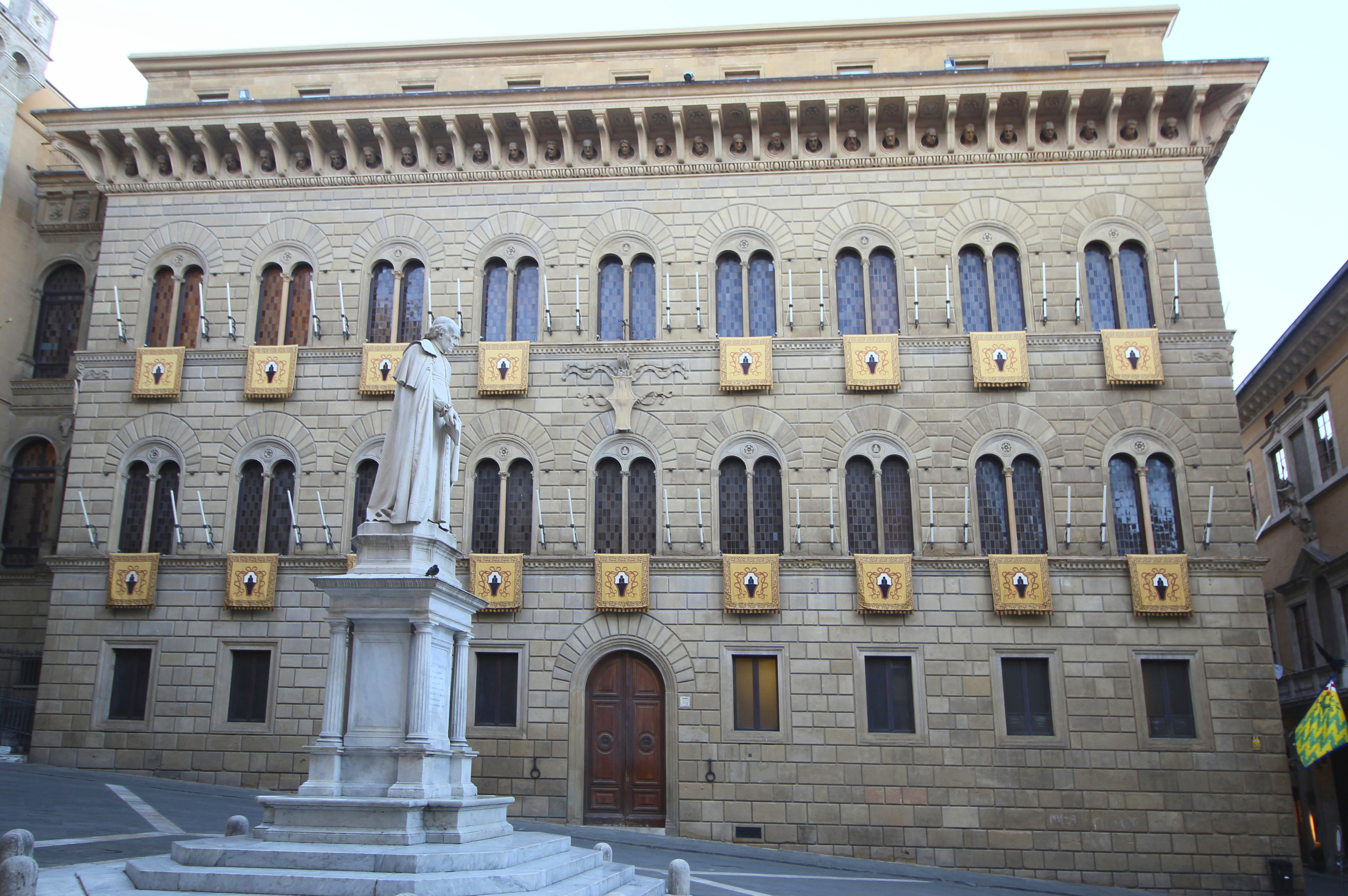
Facade of the Spannocchi palace

The Palazzo Spannocchi is a Renaissance style urban palace located on the Piazza Salimbeni, just off Via Banchi di Sopra in the Terzo di Camollia of the city of Siena, region of Tuscany, Italy. The building was associated with an ancient mercantile family of Siena.

== History ==
It was built in 1473 by Ambrogio Spannocchi, adjacent to the Gothic Palazzo Salimbeni and faces the Mannerist Renaissance Palazzo Tantucci. Spannocchi had been named Treasurer to Pope Pius II of the Sienese Piccolomini Family.

The design and construction was entrusted to the Florentine Giuliano da Maiano. The facade closely parallels the Palazzo Medici Riccardi of Florence built a few decades prior. The sober facade, of smooth stone, has three stories, with mullioned windows with round arches on the second floor. Unlike earlier Gothic palaces, which often afforded transient wooden scaffolds for either balconies or awnings, this palace has a solid protruding ceiling cornice near the roofline with classical busts putatively of Roman emperors. The interior courtyard had a scenic stairwell leading to second floor.

It faces a square with a statue of the Sienese scholar Sallustio Bandini (1882) by Tito Sarrocchi. This entire square was reformulated in the 19th century by removing a garden found in front of the Spannocchi palace.

To the left of this palace, at the bottom of the piazza stands the Gothic style Palazzo Salimbeni (14th-century), also once belonging to an important banking family of Siena, and now historical of the Monte dei Paschi di Siena bank. Across the piazza is the late-Renaissance style Palazzo Tantucci (1548), offices of the bank.

South along Via Banchi di Sopra, are the Palazzo Bichi Ruspoli and Palazzo Tolomei. To the north, along the street is the small church of Santa Maria delle Nevi.
