= Palazzo Palmieri =

Coordinates: 43.321°N 11.332°E

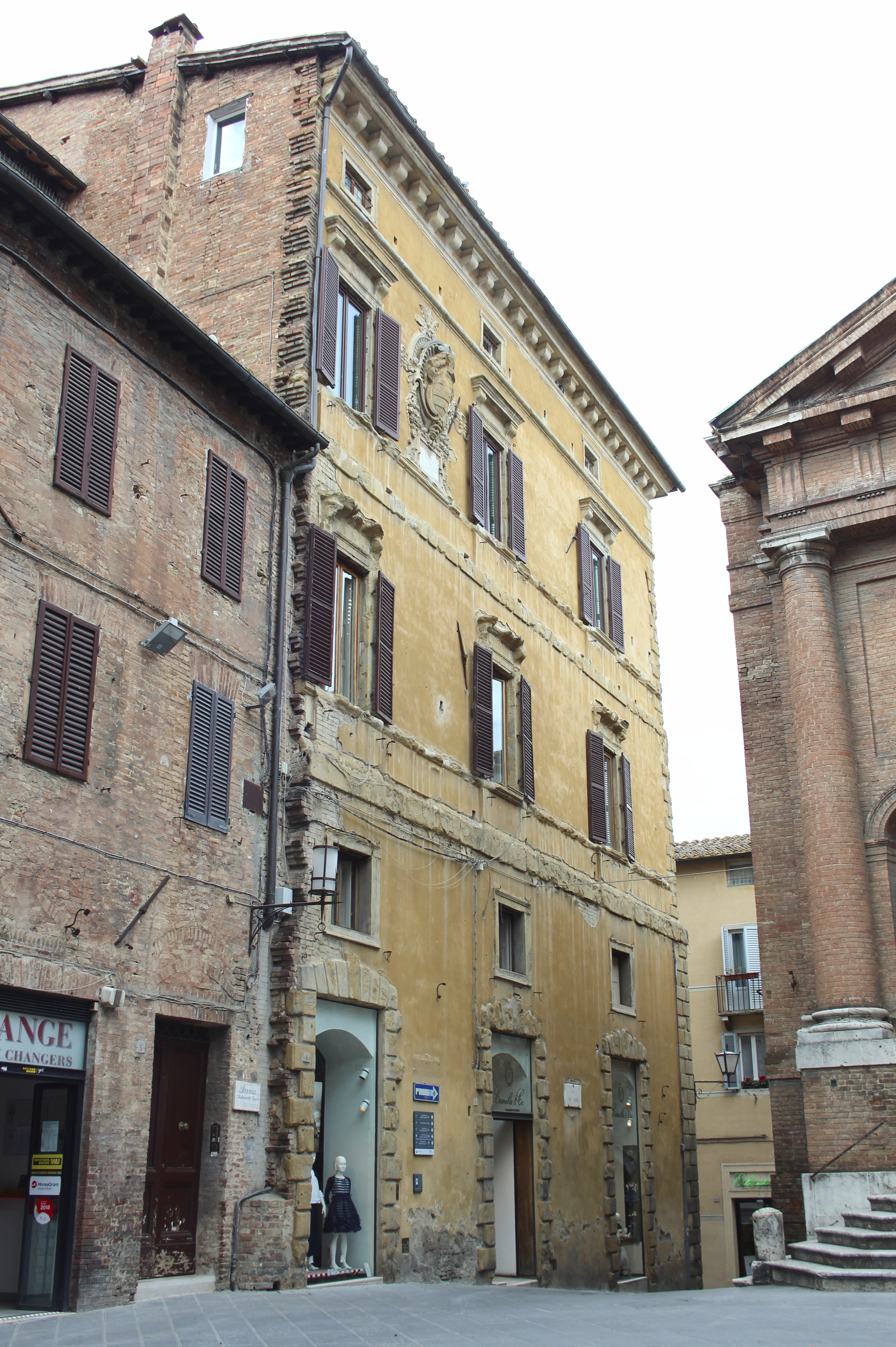
Palazzo Palmieri seen from Piazza Tolomei.

The Palazzo Palmieri, or Palazzo Nuti, is a Mannerist style urban palace, located on Via del Moro #48 in the present contrada of Civetta, Terzo di Camollia of the city of Siena, region of Tuscany, Italy.

The palace stands mostly facing the church of San Cristoforo, with a large Palmieri coat of arms on the third floor corner of the facade that fronts the Piazza Tolomei, which stands in front of Palazzo Tolomei.

== History ==
The palace, whose facade is somewhat dilapidated, was built in the middle of the 16th century by the Palmieri family. The design has been attributed to various architects, including Baldassarre Peruzzi, Giovanni Sallustio, or Antonio Maria Lari also called "Il Tozzo". A plaque on the wall recalls the refurbishment, commissioned by Scipione Palmieri in 1577, of the palace erected by Scipione's father Giovanni. Some of the rooms on the upper floors have ceilings frescoed in the 19th century.
