= Palazzo Tantucci =

Coordinates: 43.321256°N 11.33054°E

The Palazzo Tantucci is a Renaissance style (more specifically Mannerist) urban palace localized on Via dei Montanini, on the Piazza Salimbeni, in the Terzo di Camollia, in the city of Siena, region of Tuscany, Italy. To the palace's right is the Gothic facade of the Palazzo Salimbeni, and across the Piazza with Sallustio Bandini's statue is the Classic Renaissance facade of the Palazzo Spannocchi. All three palaces are owned now by the Monte dei Paschi di Siena, the oldest bank in the world, which arose in the Salimbeni palace.

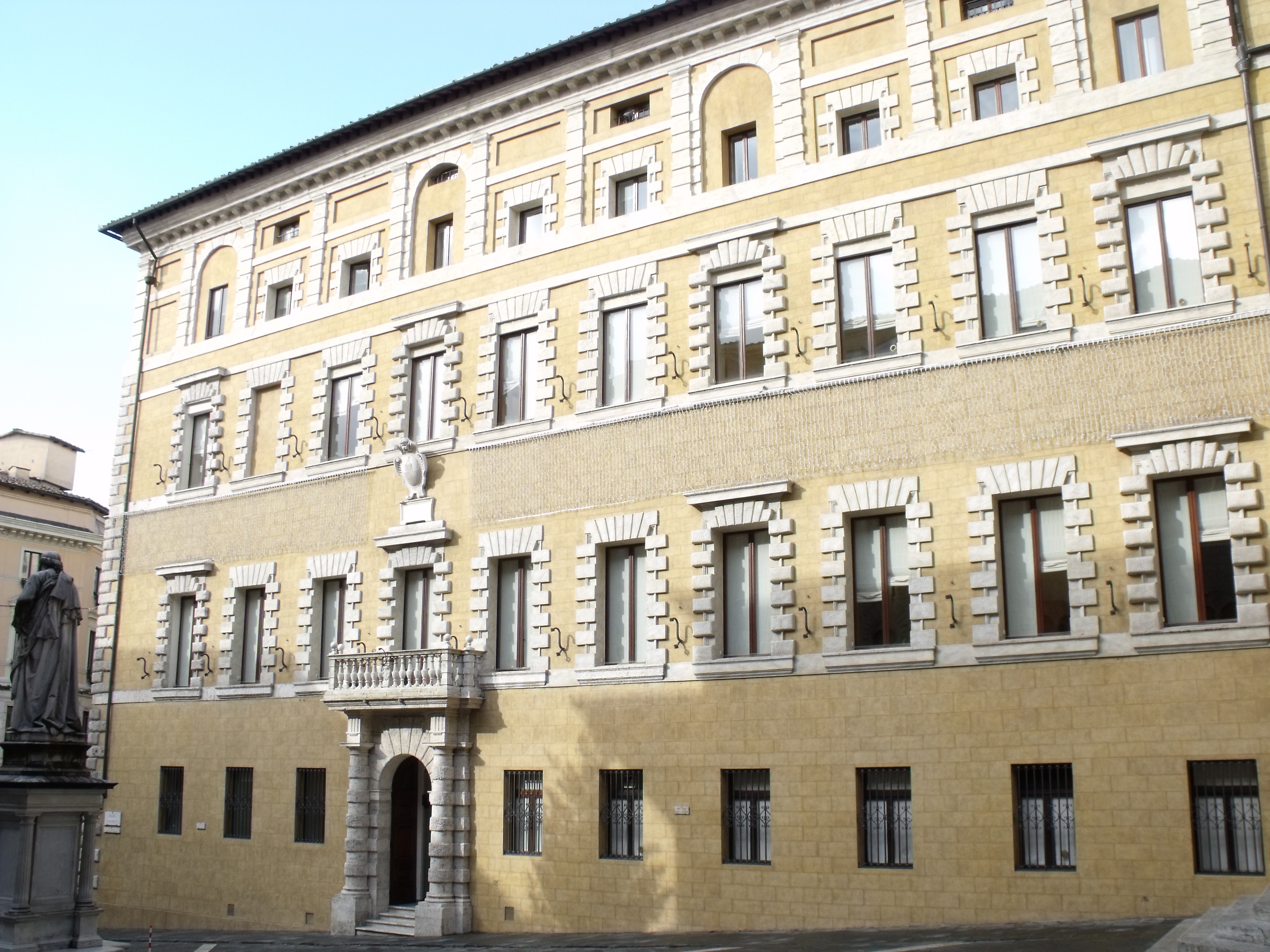
Palazzo Tantucci with Bandini statue at left of photo.

== History ==
Construction of the palace in 1548 was commissioned by Mariano Tantucci from the artist Bartolomeo Neroni. The interiors underwent a series of reconstructions, including one by Giuseppe Partini in the 19th century. Since 1868, it has housed offices of the Banca Monte dei Paschi di Siena, and it was linked to the adjacent palaces in the 1970s by Pierluigi Spadolini.

== Bibliography ==
- Toscana. Guida d'Italia (Guida rossa), Touring Club Italiano, Milan 2003. ISBN 88-365-2767-1
