= Giuseppe Partini =

Italian architect (1842–1895)

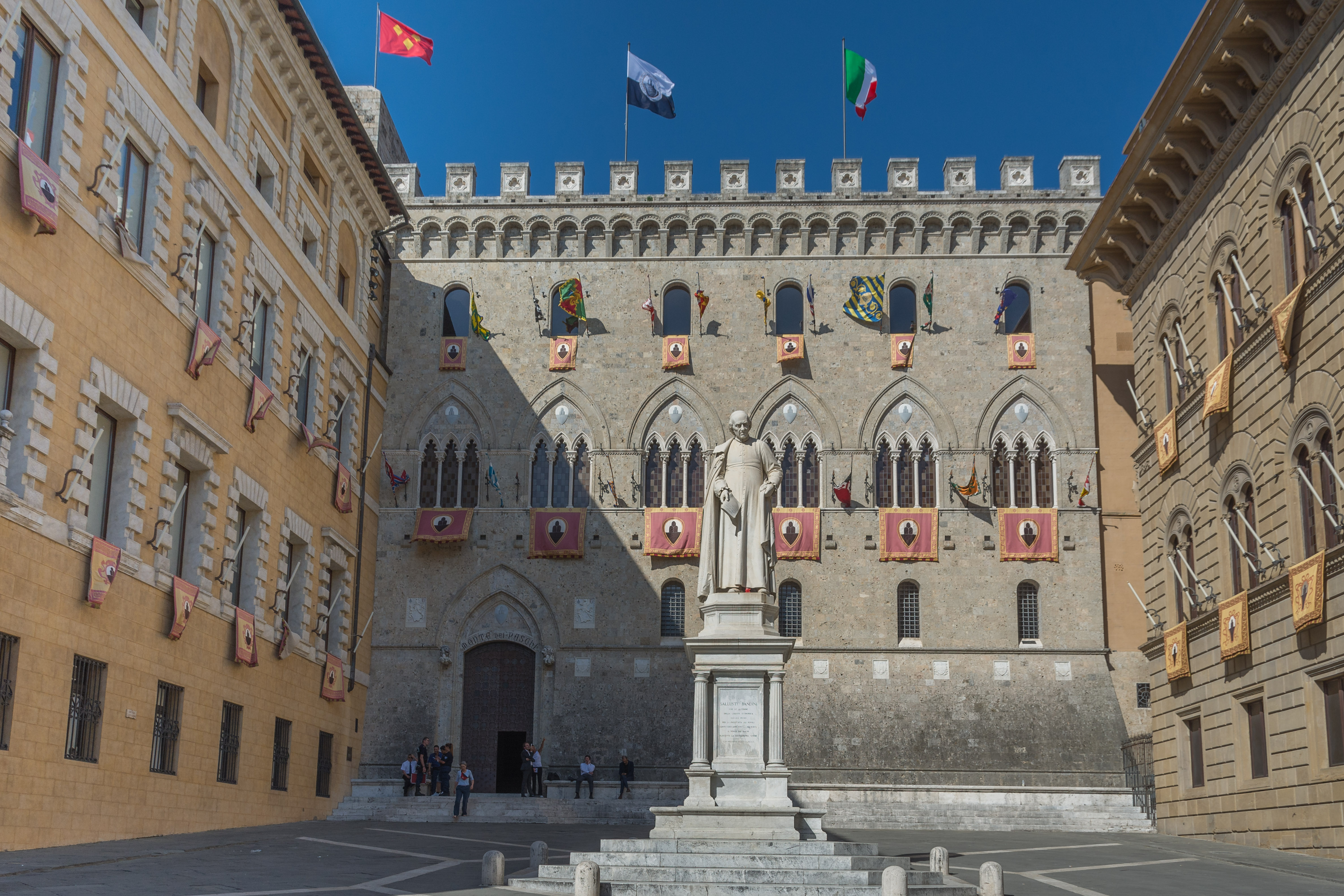
- Piazza Salimbeni, Siena
- Born: 5 May 1842; Siena, Grand Duchy of Tuscany
- Died: 14 October 1895 (aged 53); Siena, Kingdom of Italy
- Known for: Architecture
- Movement: Purismo; Gothic Revival

Giuseppe Partini (5 May 1842 – 14 November 1895) was an Italian architect, mostly involved in reconstructions in his native Siena. He was active with the sculptor Tito Sarocchi in the reconstruction of the Fonte Gaia in Piazza del Campo in Siena Italy, replacement of its original panels with copies. He also helped in the reconstruction of the Palazzo Marsili and the Palazzo Tantucci in Siena. He was an architects involved with maintenance of the Siena Cathedral. He reconstructed the Palazzo di Giustizia in Chiavari.

== Biography ==
=== Early life and education ===
Giuseppe Partini was born in Siena on 5 May 1842. He studied architecture (1857–61) under Lorenzo Doveri (1799–1866) and Giulio Rossi (1819–61) at the Accademia di Belle Arti in Siena. At that time the Accademia was an important centre of the Purismo movement, led by the painter Luigi Mussini.

=== Career ===
On Rossi’s death in 1861, Partini became an assistant teacher at the Accademia. That year he built his first work, a chapel for the Pieri Nerli family at Quinciano in the Val d’Arbia, near Siena. It is a small octagonal temple in a medieval style, decorated internally by contemporary Purismo artists, including Mussini, the sculptor Tito Sarrocchi and the painter Cesare Maccari. Also in 1861, he took part in a competition to design the new façade of Santa Maria del Fiore in Florence; although unsuccessful, his tripartite design for the cathedral attracted attention and led to many commissions. These included the funerary monument (1862; carved by Sarrocchi) for his teacher Giulio Rossi in the cemetery of Misericordia, Siena.

When Doveri died in 1866, Partini succeeded him as professor in the department of architecture at the Accademia and took over other prestigious posts, becoming the leading architect in Siena. As architect in charge of the Opera del Duomo he supervised, over a period of about 20 years, numerous projects that were intended to accentuate the Gothic character of the cathedral and led to the creation of the Museo dell’Opera.

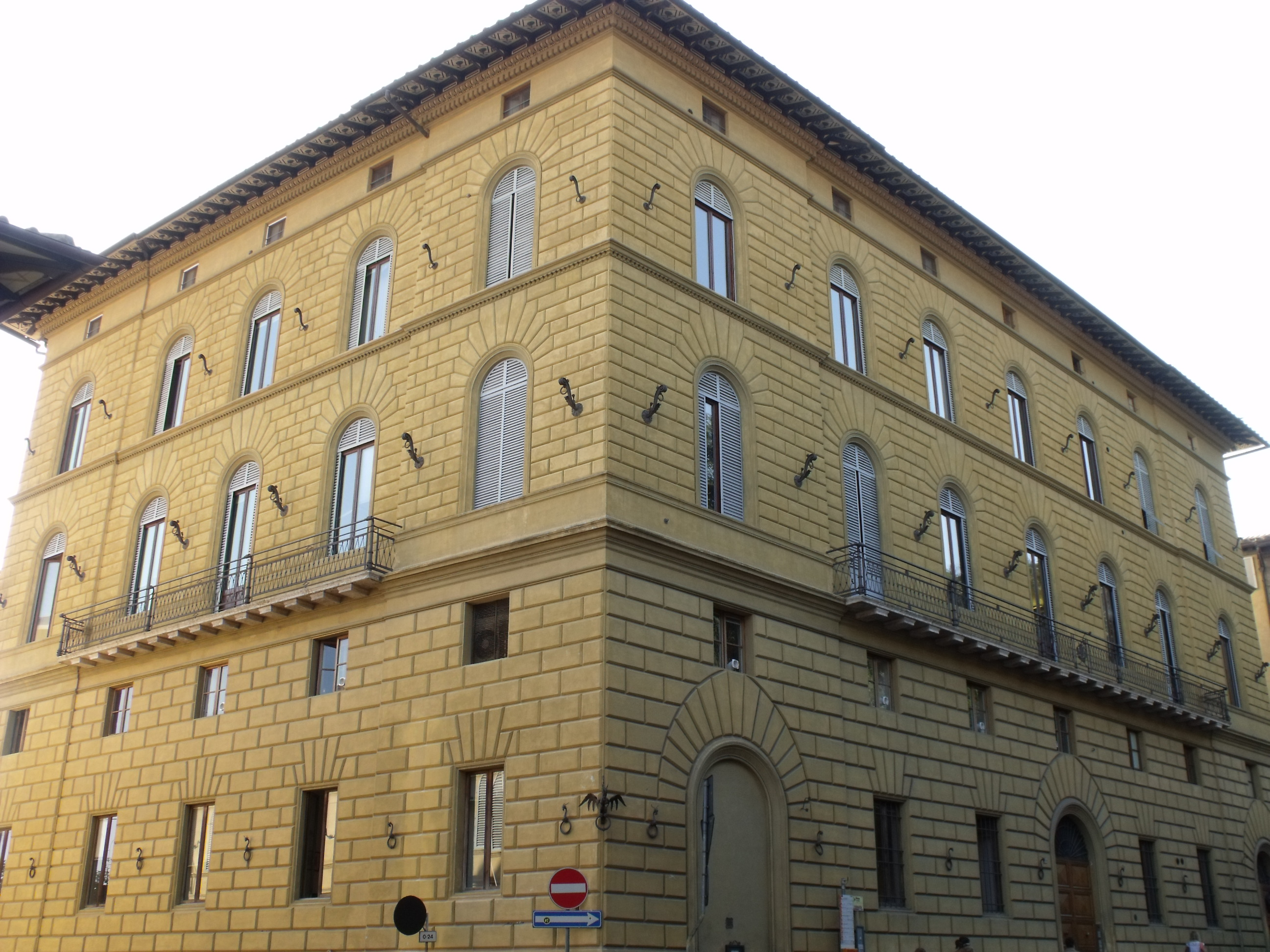
Palazzo Franci, Siena

As architect to the Arciconfraternita della Misericordia, he designed and built the extensions to their cemetery (1873–4 and 1893–4) as well as many family chapels within it, including his wife’s tomb (1873) and family tombs for the Piccolomini (1878), Pollini (1883), Franci (1887) and De Metz (1893). He also became architect to the Istituto per Sordomuti ‘T. Pendolo’ and supervised the restoration and enlargement (1875–94) of the institute’s premises.

In addition to these official duties Partini worked almost continuously on both restorations and new buildings. His restorations included the medieval Castello di Belcaro (1865–70), near Siena, which had been much enlarged and remodelled by Baldassare Peruzzi; the Ospedale di Santa Fina (1865–76) at San Gimignano; the Benedictine abbey of Monte Oliveto Maggiore (from 1869); the creation of the Piazza Salimbeni (1871–9), Siena, including the new customs house; the cathedral (1875–6) at Grosseto; and the remodelling in a neo-Gothic style of the Castello di Torre Alfina (1881 onwards), north of Bolsena. He also removed (1883–94) the 17th-century Baroque work that clothed the medieval Basilica of San Francesco, Siena and remodelled the façade and internally restored the cathedral of Chiusi (1884–94).

Among the many new buildings designed by Partini in his mature years were the Sala del Risorgimento (1878–90), dedicated to Victor Emmanuel II, in the Palazzo Pubblico in Siena; the Palazzo Giustizia (1882) at Chiavari; and his own house, the Villa della Selva (1890), at Osservanza, near Siena. He also found time to serve on many ministerial commissions dealing with the protection of historic monuments, but despite this volume of work Partini was virtually ignored in the 20th century, until an exhibition in Siena in 1991.

== Selected works ==
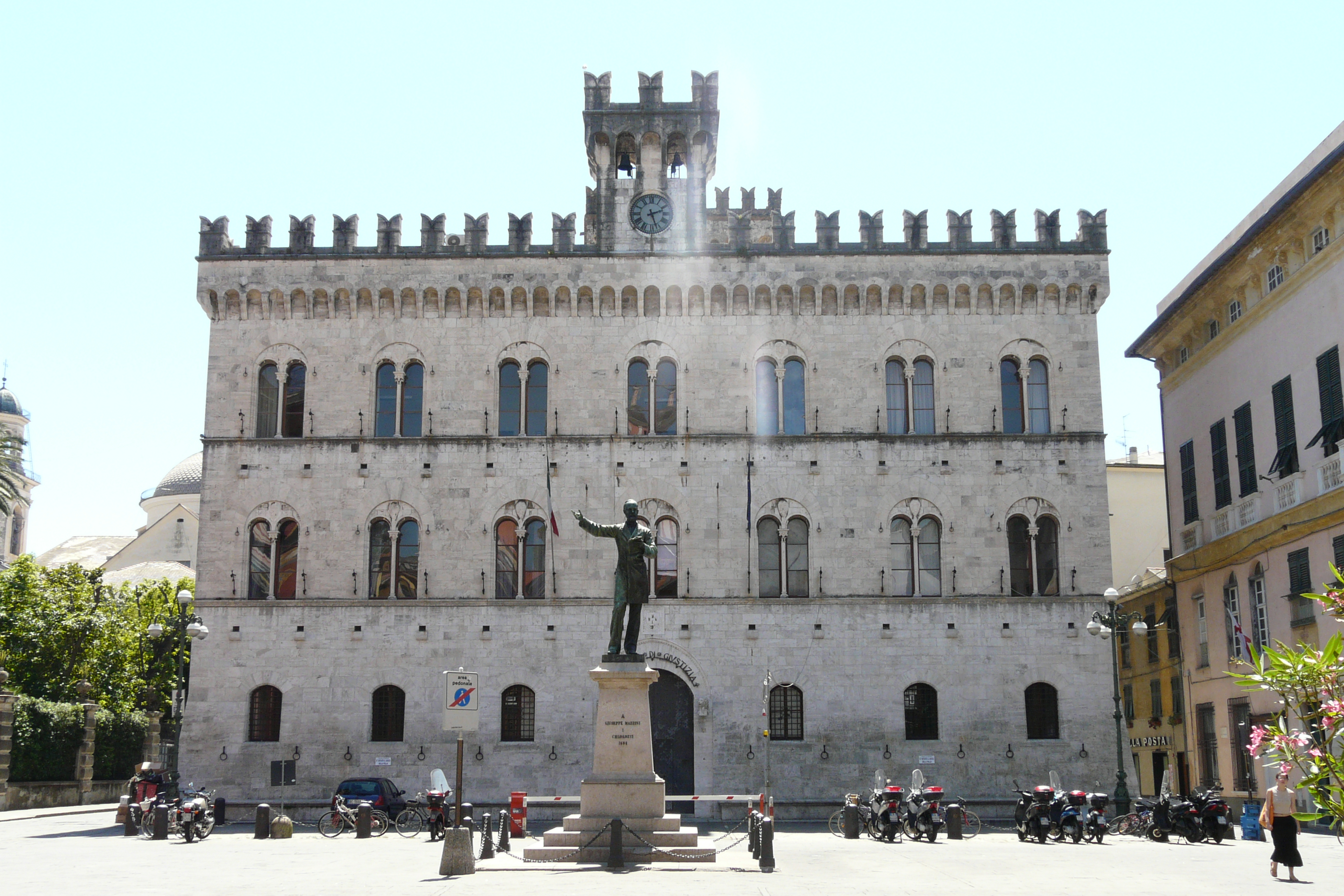
Palazzo di Giustizia at Chiavari

- 1861-1863 Pieri-Nerli Chapel at Quinciano
- 1865-1868 Reconstruction of the Fonte Gaia in Piazza del Campo, Siena
- 1865-1876 Ospedale di Santa Fina, San Gimignano
- 1870 Ospedale di Montalcino
- 1871-1879 Piazza and Palazzo Salimbeni at Siena
- 1878-1881 Renovation of the Palazzo Comunale at San Gimignano
- 1881 Remodelling of the Castello di Torre Alfina
- 1882 Palazzo di Giustizia at Chiavari
- 1887-1894 Renovation of the Basilica of San Francesco, Siena.
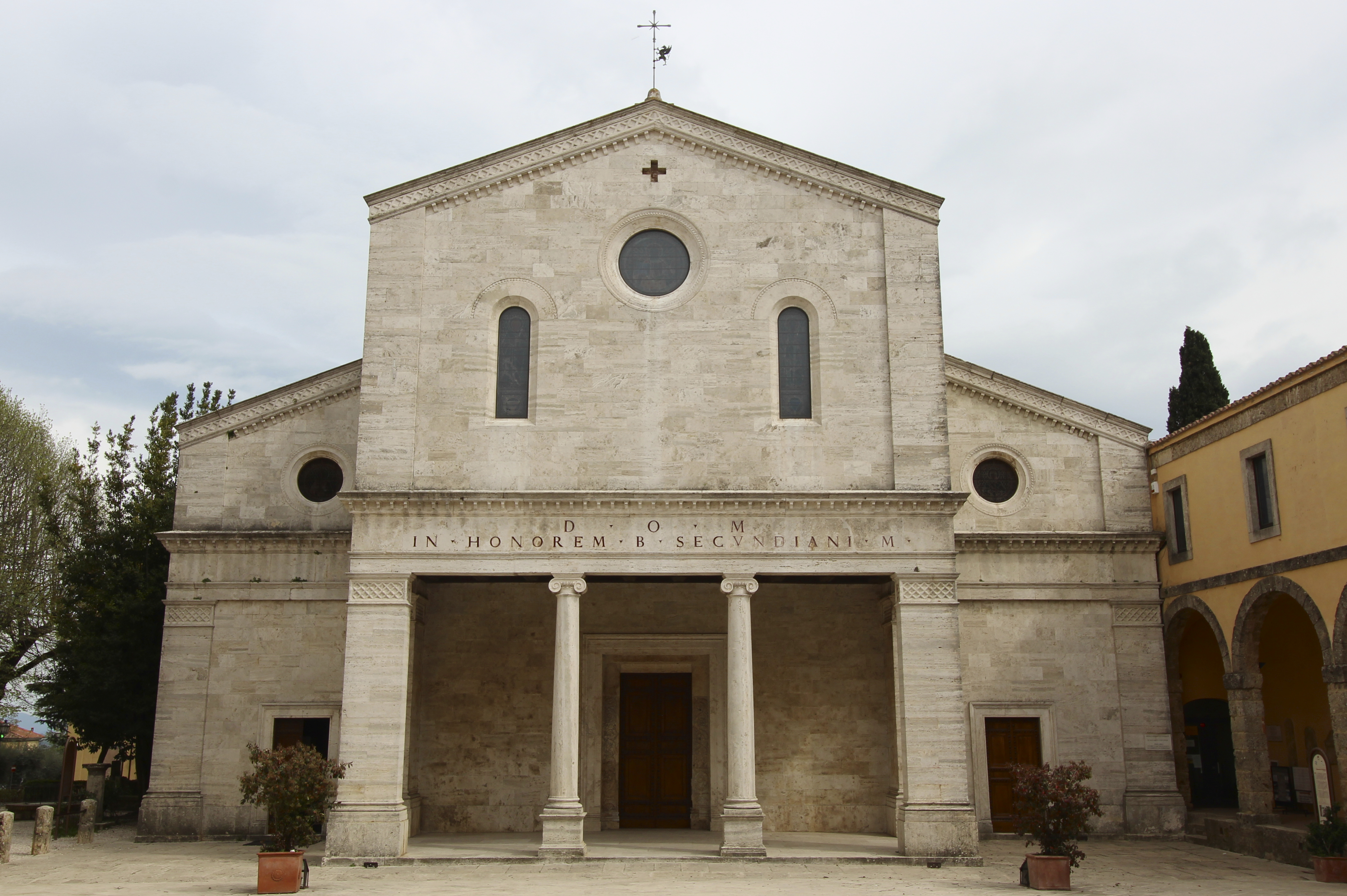
Façade of Chiusi Cathedral

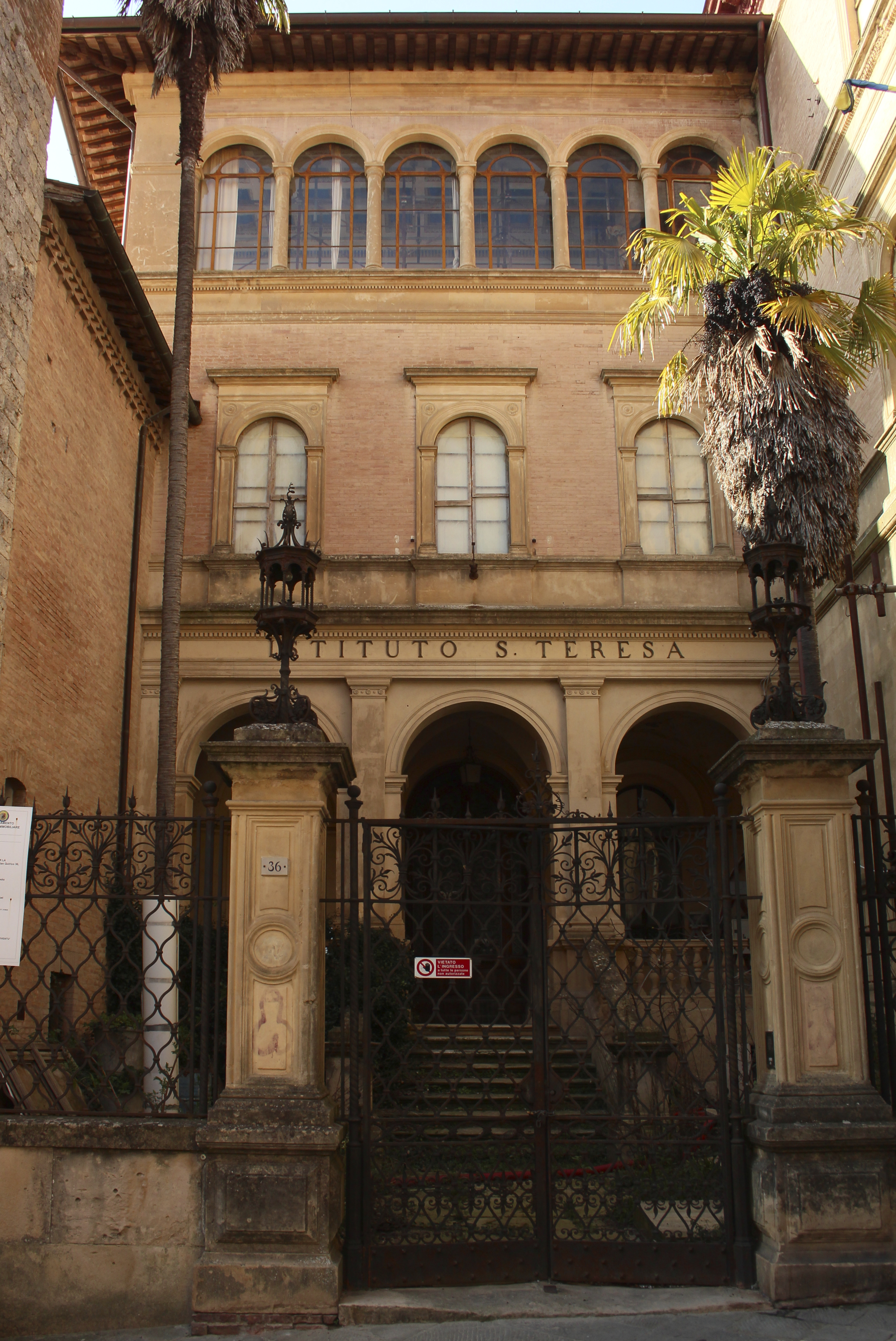
Istituto Santa Teresa, Siena

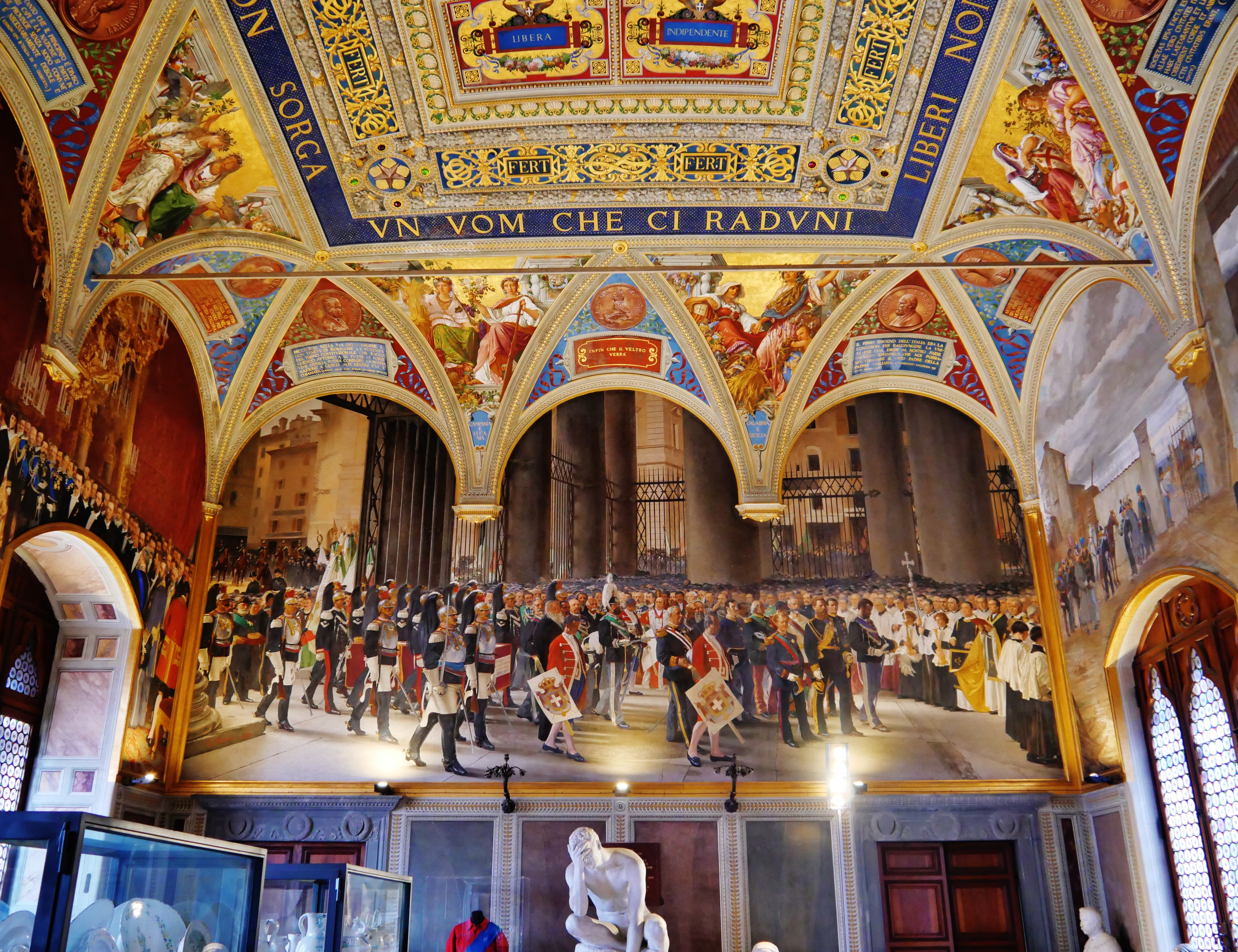
Sala del Risorgimento, Palazzo Pubblico, Siena

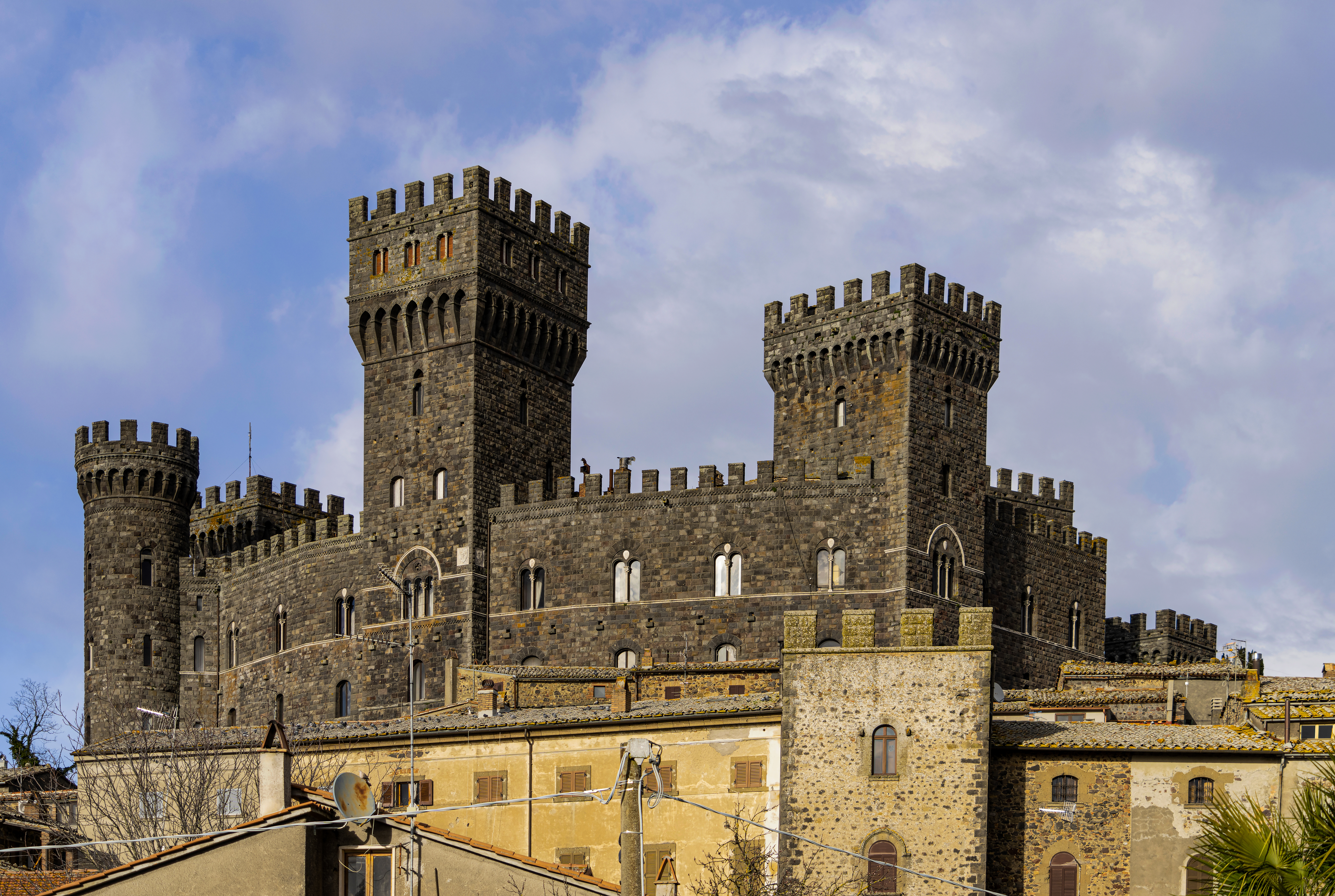
Castello di Torre Alfina

== Bibliography ==
- Bertini, J. (1894). Intorno ai restauri artistici fatti nel tempio di San Francesco in Siena dal 1883 al 1884. Siena.
- Carocci, G. (1895). "Giuseppe Partini". Arte e storia. 14 (14).
- Reycend, G. A. (1896). Cenni commemorativi dall’arch. Giuseppe Partini. Turin.
- Donati, F. (1897). "Collezione dei principali lavori eseguiti dall'arch. Giuseppe Partini". Bullettino senese di storia patria. 4 (1): 467–70.
