= Piazza Salimbeni =

Square in Siena, Italy

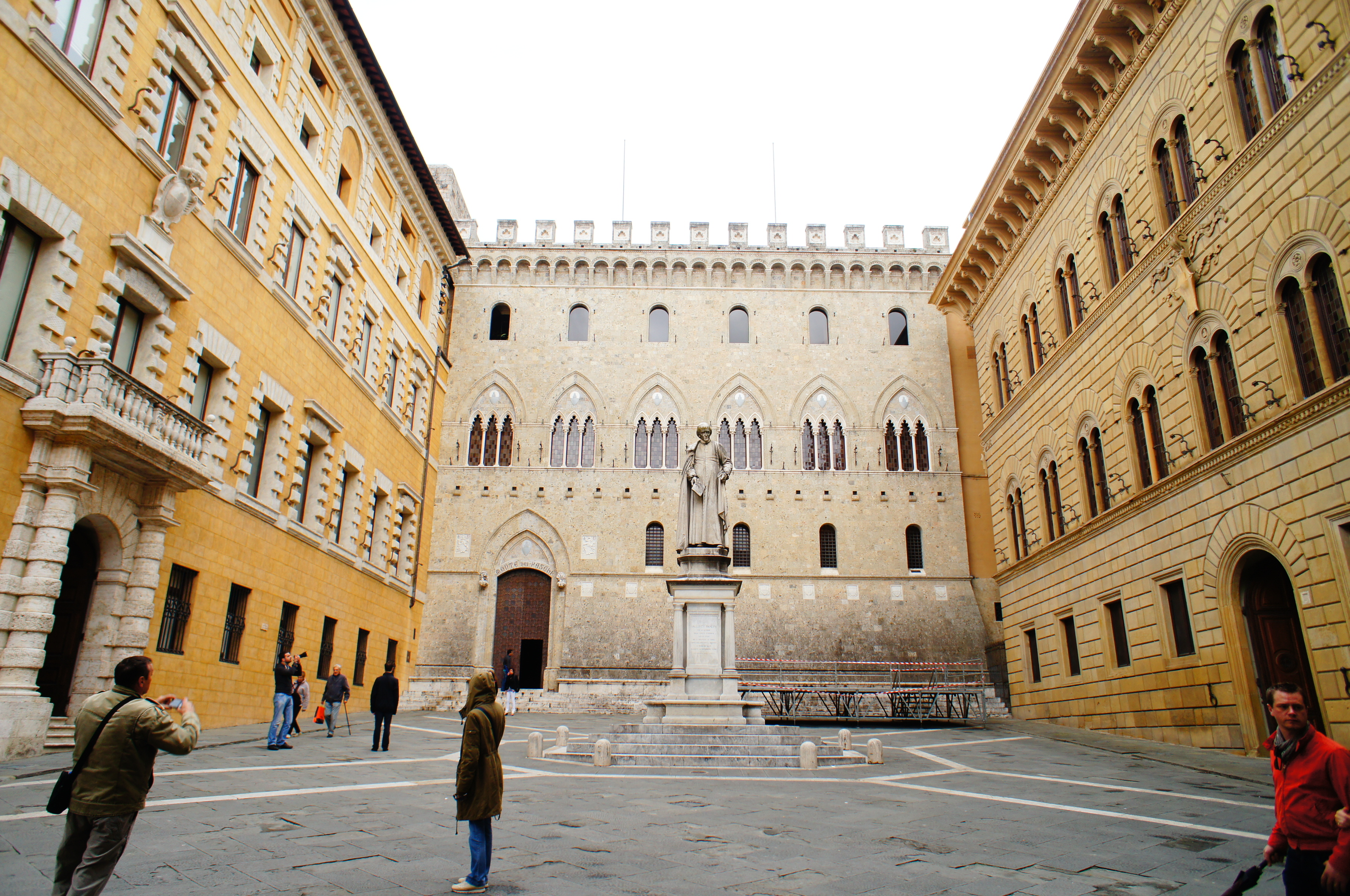

- Location within Tuscany
- Location: Siena, Tuscany, Italy
- Coordinates: 43°19′16″N 11°19′51″E

The Piazza Salimbeni is a prominent square in central Siena, Region of Tuscany, Italy. It is notable for still housing the offices of one of the first banking houses in Europe, the Banca Monte dei Paschi di Siena. It is surrounded clockwise starting from north by the following palaces:

- Palazzo Tantucci
- Palazzo Salimbeni
- Palazzo Spannocchi

The palace facades were harmonized to a neo-gothic-style during the nineteenth century by the architect Giuseppe Partini. In the center of the square is the statue of Sallustio Bandini, a Sienese priest and one of the first Italian economists, sculpted by Tito Sarrocchi (1882).

Piazza Salimbeni facades

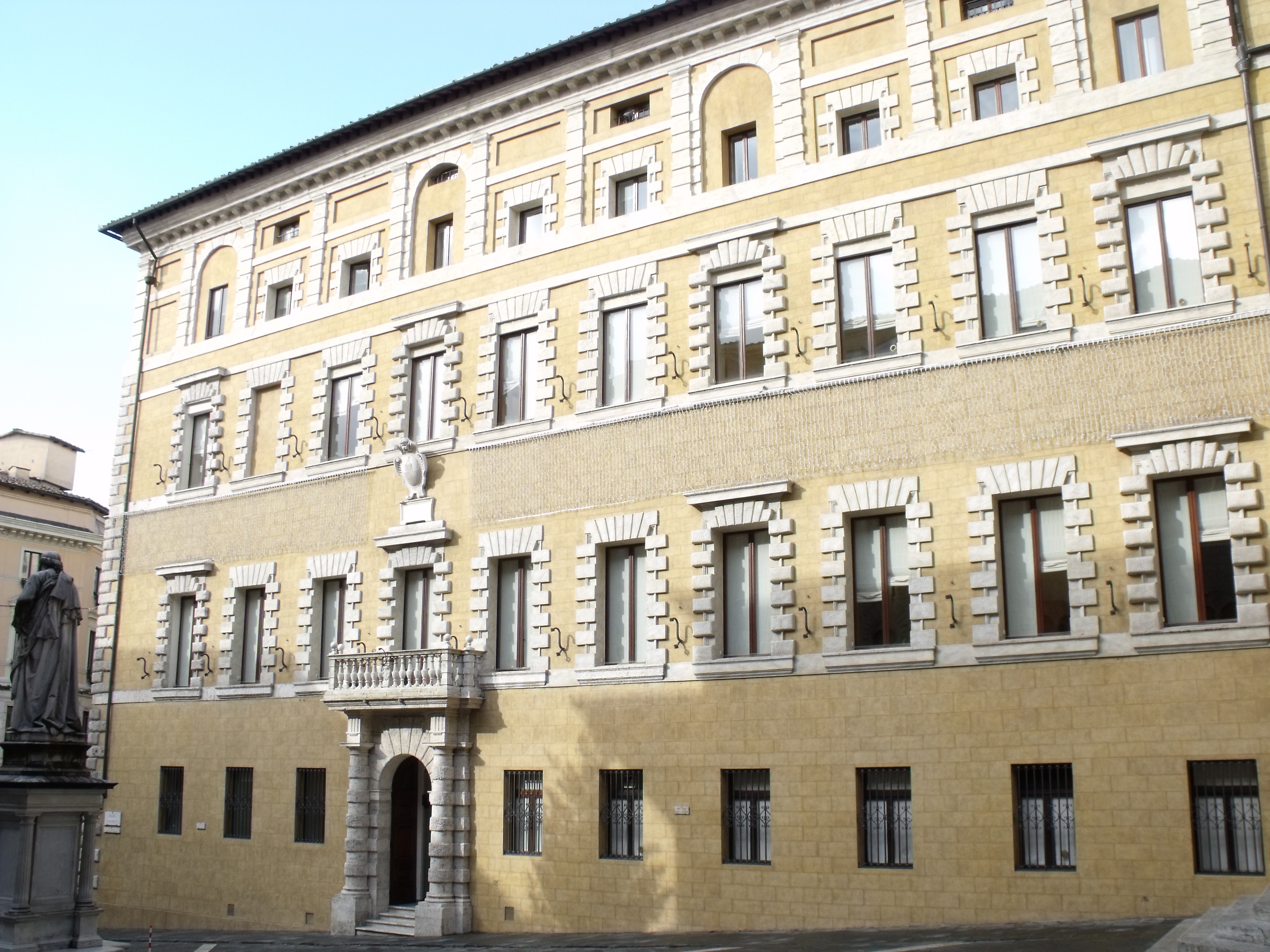
Palazzo Tantucci

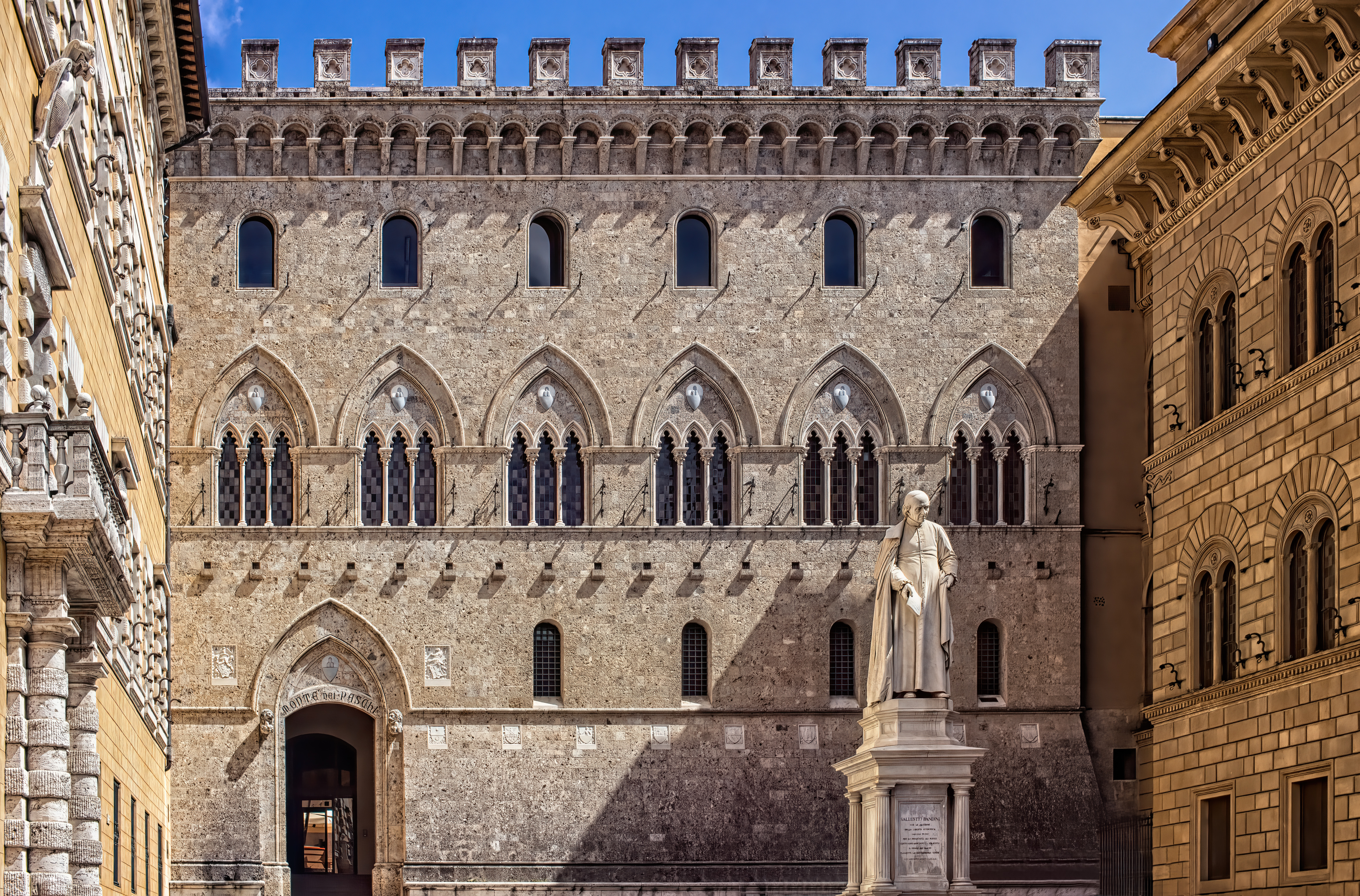
Palazzo Salimbeni

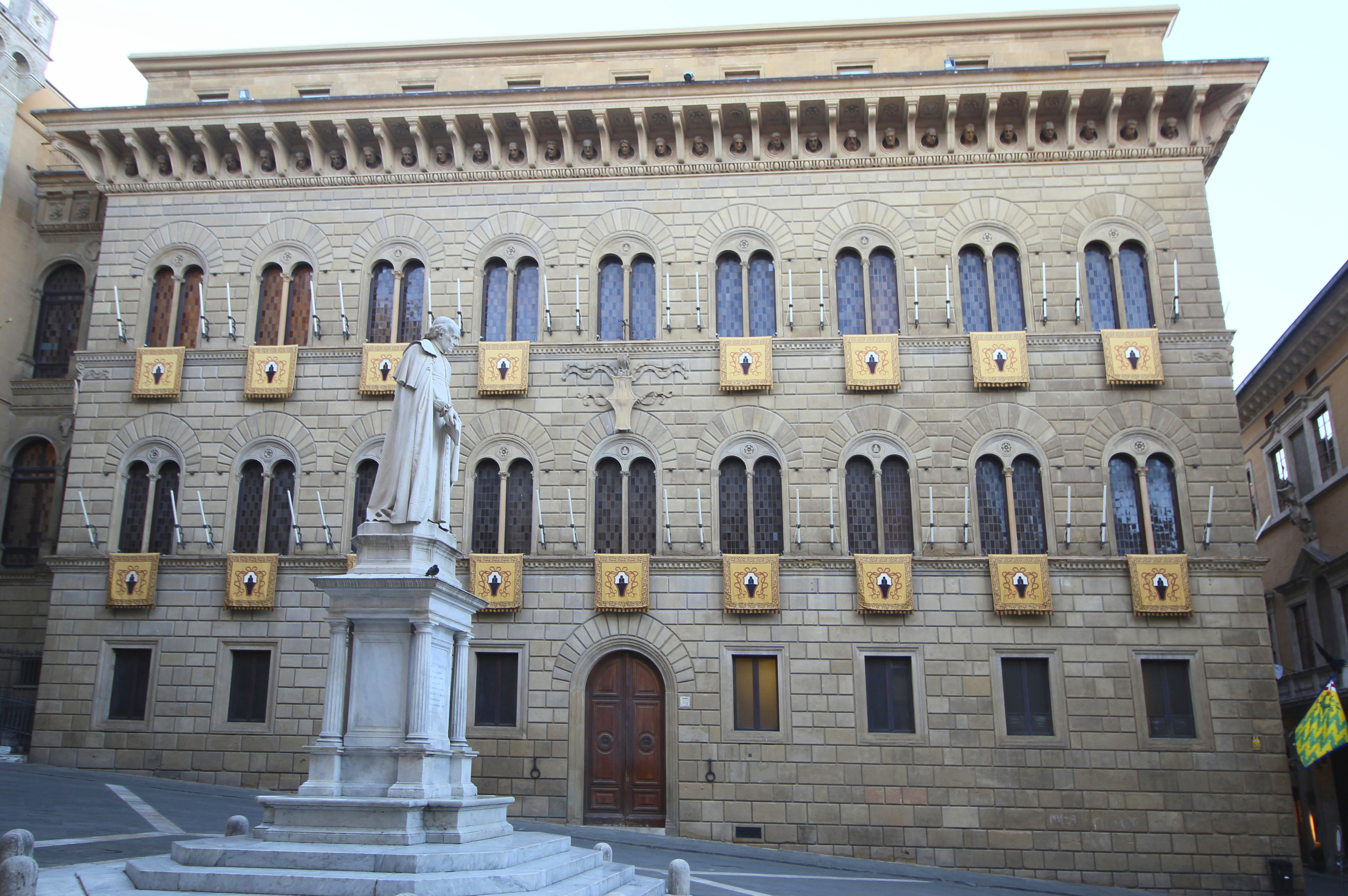
Palazzo Spannocchi
