= Palazzo Bichi Ruspoli =

Coordinates: 43.3205°N 11.3311°E

The Palazzo Bichi Ruspoli, or previously Palazzo or Castellare dei Rossi, is an urban palace, located on Via Banchi di Sopra in the present contrada of Civetta, Terzo di Camollia of the city of Siena, region of Tuscany, Italy.

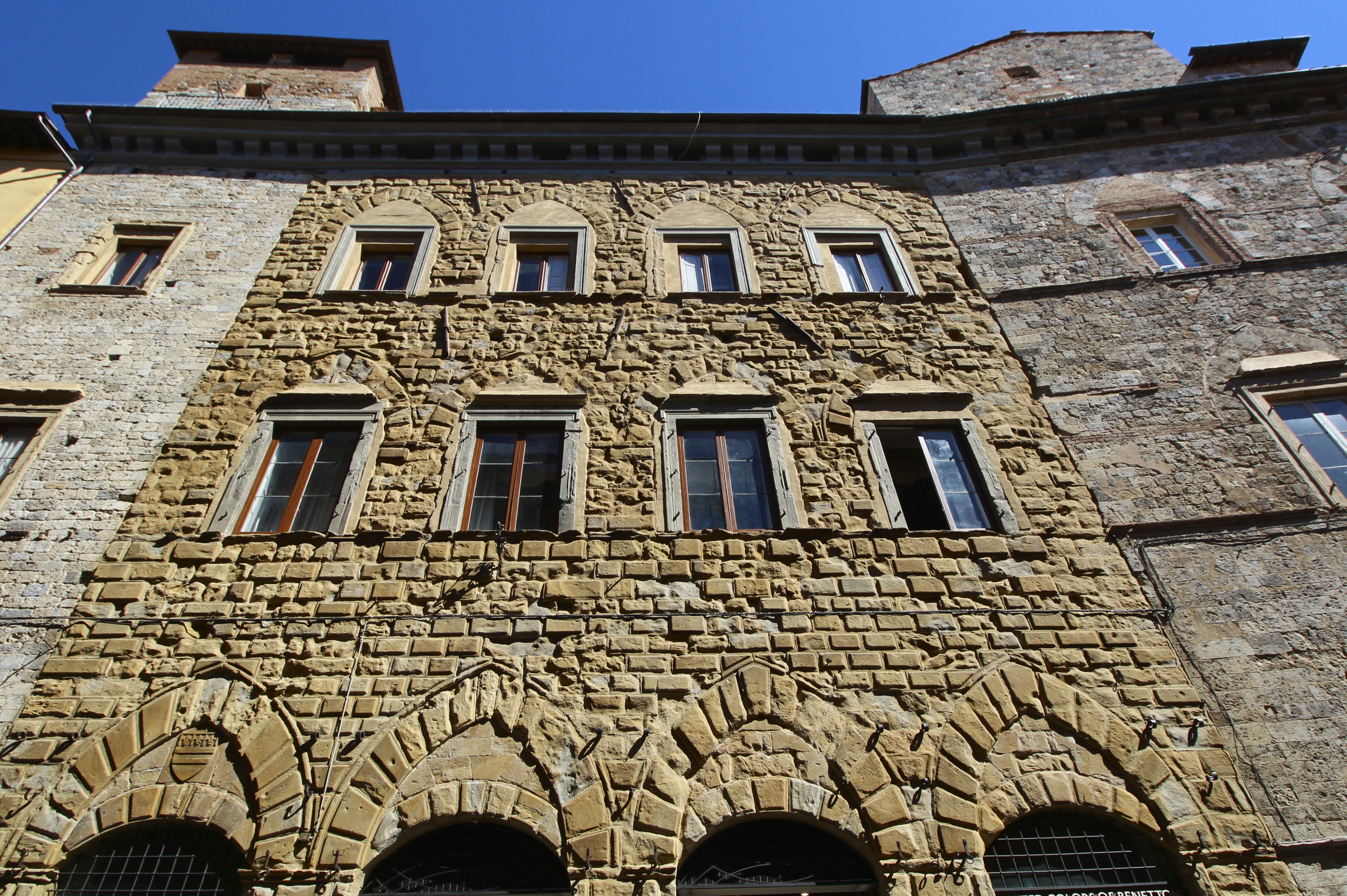
Facade of Palazzo Bichi Ruspoli.

== History ==
The sober stone palace is just south of the Palazzo Salimbeni and north of the Palazzo Tolomei on the Via Banchi di Sopra.

The three-story palace with a curved facade was enlarged by Alessandro Bichi in 1520. The palace originally was owned by the Rossi family and housed Charles of Anjou during a stay in Siena. It was built with rusticated limestone blocks in the 14th century around an earlier, 13th century, castle-like block with a tower and peaked ground floor arches. The present rectangular upper windows date to later reconstructions.

The present Neoclassic style interiors were commissioned in the 18th century by the Marquis Bichi Ruspoli from the artist and architect Jacopo Franchini. The entrance was designed by Pietro Marchetti.

Despite successive reconstructions, the baroque interior decoration of the chapel remain. The interiors maintain much of the original Neoclassical fresco decoration by Alessandro Franchi, Cesare Maffei, and Giovanni Bandini. It now serves as a rental residence and bank offices. There is another Palazzo Bichi Ruspoli at Roccalbegna.
