= Castello di Belcaro =

Castle in Tuscany, Italy

Coordinates: 43°18′25.3″N 11°17′26.3″E

The Castello di Belcaro is a Renaissance villa built at the site of a Castle once belonging to the Republic of Siena in Tuscany. It is located some 5.5 kilometers southwest of the Siena city gate of Porta San Marco, on the direction towards Grosseto, it is beyond a former benedictine monastery and church of Sant'Eugenio. The address is strada di Terrenzano e Belcaro #32.

== History ==
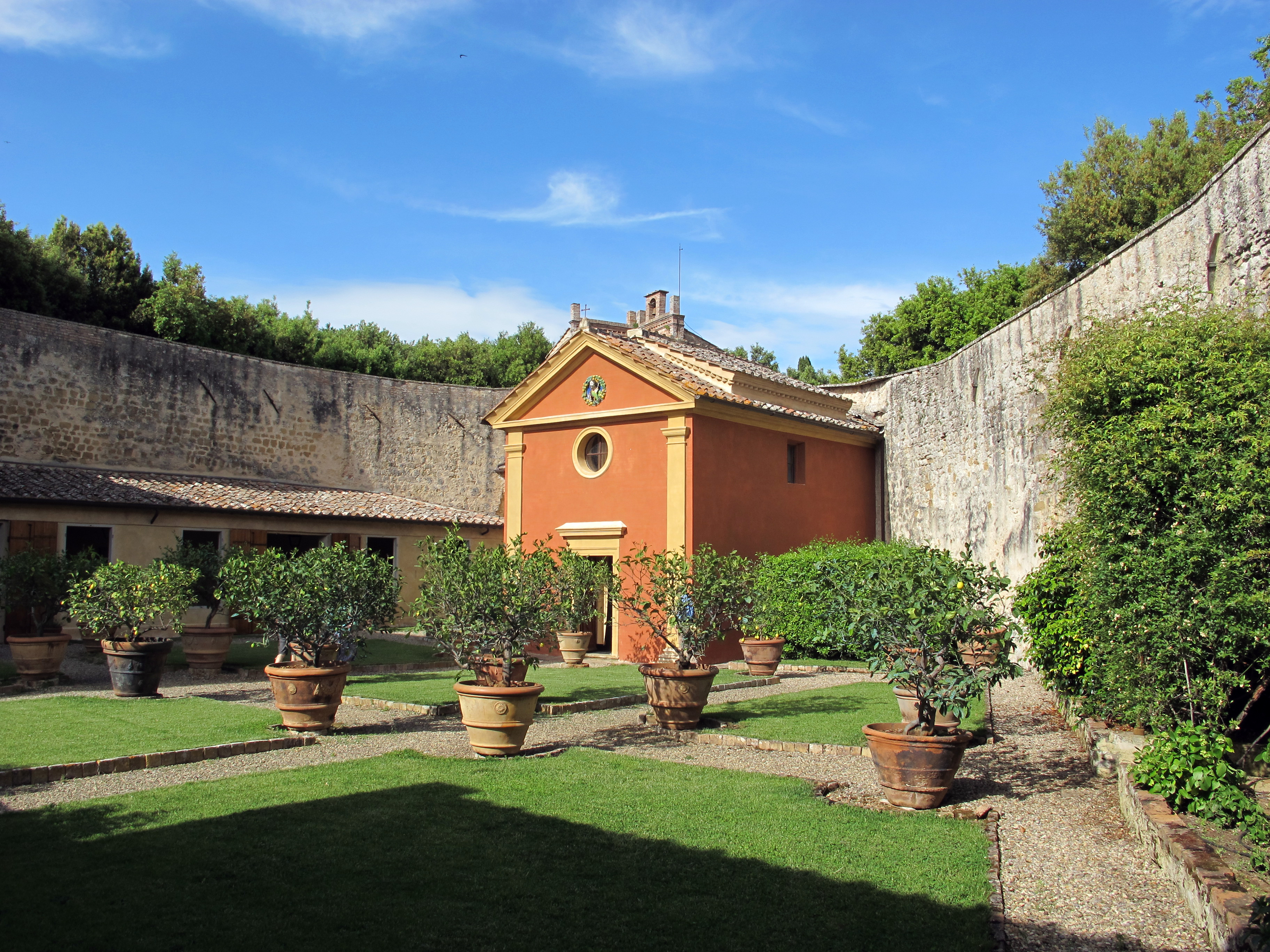
Chapel inside walled garden of castle

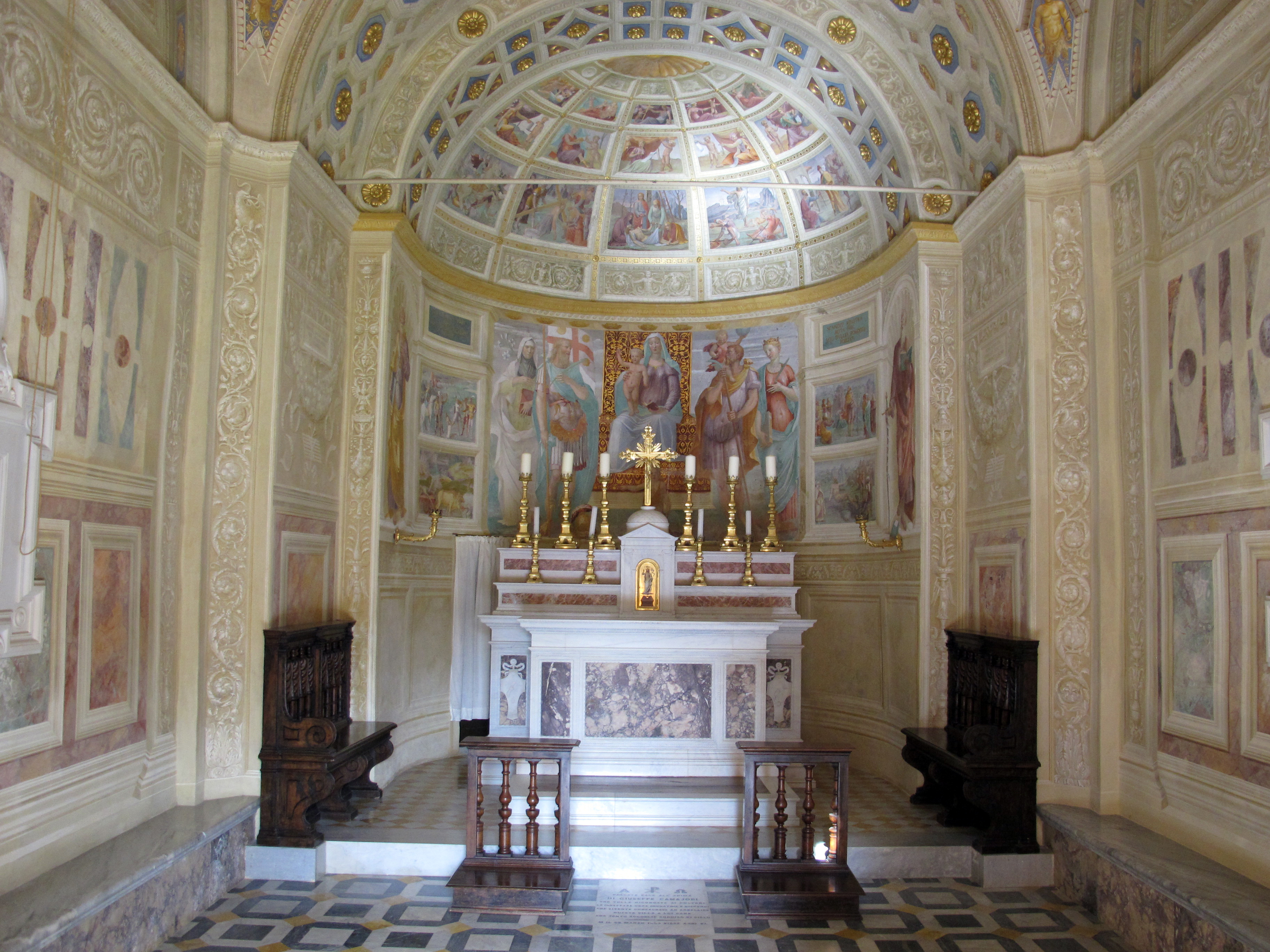
Chapel interior: frescoes by Giorgio di Giovanni

The villa was commissioned in 1525 by the banker Crescenzo Turamini, to be built over the ruins of the castle at Belcaro. The architect is attributed to either or both Giorgio di Giovanni and/or Baldassare Peruzzi.

In 1554 the site was occupied by the besieging forces of Cosimo di Medici, as a stone inscription on the walls recalls, and his son Giangiacomo dei Medici reinstated the site as a fortress. In the 19th century, the Camaiori family refurbished the villa in a neo-Renaissance style, with gardens and courtyards, with the designs of Serafino Belli and Giuseppe Partini. The grounds have a private chapel with frescoes, all enclosed by fortress walls.

The frescoes inside the villa are attributed to Peruzzi. They include the frescoes of the Judgment of Paris. Of these, the 18th-century Sienese art historian states:

And it required the artist (Peruzzi) to adorn the castle. He did so with the peace of mind all the more gratifying to those who due to the endless riots and dangerous events, almost miraculously, found in an open, secure, uncrowded, distant but only three miles from home. (Peruzzi's) paintings here, belong in a museum, and are among the best he ever made...The colors are so fresh, and so natural that seem posed by nature itself above fruitful and healthy bodies; the design is correct without appearing art. They do not have the muscularity favored by Michelangelo, but everything is freshness, youth, and bloom. It seems that he did this work with the calmer mood; because in this composition, even the most difficult things emerged easily from his brush, obedient to a fertile imagination.
