= Pietro Marchetti =

Italian physician, anatomist and surgeon (1589–1673)

Pietro Marchetti KOSM
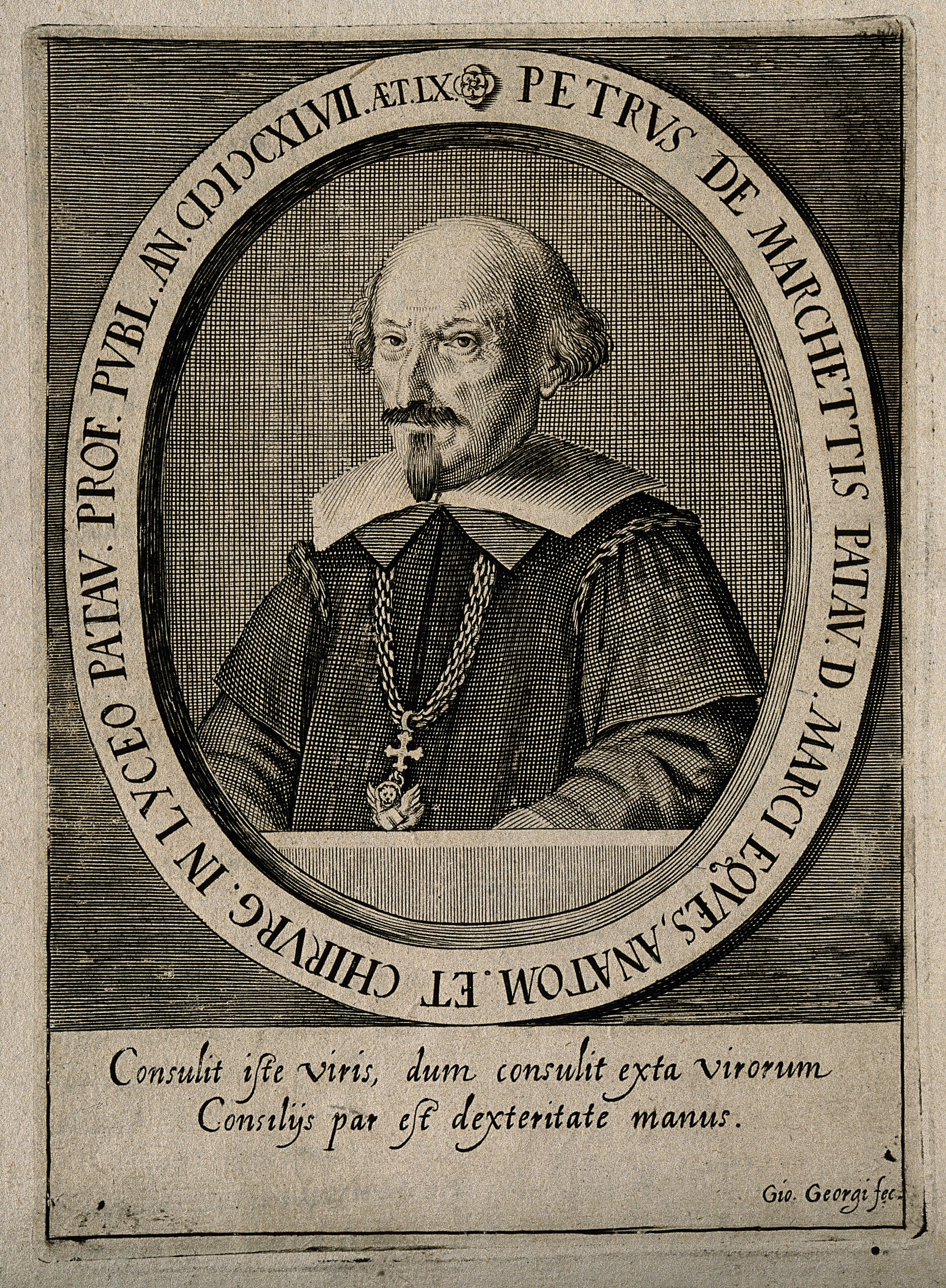
- Pietro Marchetti. Line engraving by G. Giorgi, 1647
- Born: 1589; Padua, Republic of Venice
- Died: April 16, 1673 (aged 83–84); Padua, Republic of Venice
- Resting place: Basilica of Saint Anthony of Padua; 45°24′05″N 11°52′51″E
- Education: University of Padua
- Scientific career
- Fields: Medicine; Anatomy; Surgery
- Workplaces: University of Padua
- Doctoral advisor: Hieronymus Fabricius

Pietro Marchetti or Marchettis KOSM (1589 – 16 April 1673) was an Italian physician, anatomist and surgeon. According to the British historian of medicine Edward Withington, Marchetti was one the most important Italian surgeons of the seventeenth century.

== Biography ==
Pietro Marchetti was professor of anatomy at Padua, where he was born, and where he continued to teach from 1652 until 1669, when he was allowed to resign his chair to his son Antonio. In 1661, he also obtained the appointment to the first professorship of surgery, which he held along with that of anatomy.

Marchetti had an excellent knowledge of anatomy, and made important contributions to liver surgery, orthopedic surgery, neurosurgery and the treatment of gunshot wounds. For his merits, he was made knight of the Order of Saint Mark. Marchetti became famous both in Italy and abroad. Francis Willughby and John Ray attended his lectures during their stay in Padua in 1663-64.

At the age of 80, he retired altogether from the university. He died in April 1673. His two sons, Domenico and Antonio, were likewise both professors in their native university of Padua. A famed anatomist, Domenico Marchetti was a fervent supporter of Harvey's theory of blood circulation, and a fierce opponent of Riolan. In 1652 he demonstrated, in the presence of Thomas Bartholin, that liquid injected into the arteries emerged by the veins. Domenico Marchetti was the author of a good compendium of anatomy, according to the judgment of Haller, which went through several editions, under the title of "Anatomia, cui Responsiones ad Riolanum, Anatomicum Parisiensem, in ipsius animadversionibus contra Veslingium, additae sunt", Padua, 1652.

== Works ==
- "Anatomia", Venice, 1654.
- "Tendinis flexoris pollicis ab equo evulsi observatio", Padua 1658.
- "Sylloge Observationum Medico-chirurgicarum rariorum", Padua, 1664, several times reprinted, and translated into French and German. It contained fifty-three cases of some interest, and three tracts on ulcers, on fistulas of the urethra, and on spina ventosa.

== Bibliography ==
- Chalmers, Alexander (1815). "Marchetti, Peter De". General Biographical Dictionary. Vol. 21. London: J. Nichols. pp. 287–288.
