= Giorgio di Giovanni =

Italian painter (1552–1606)

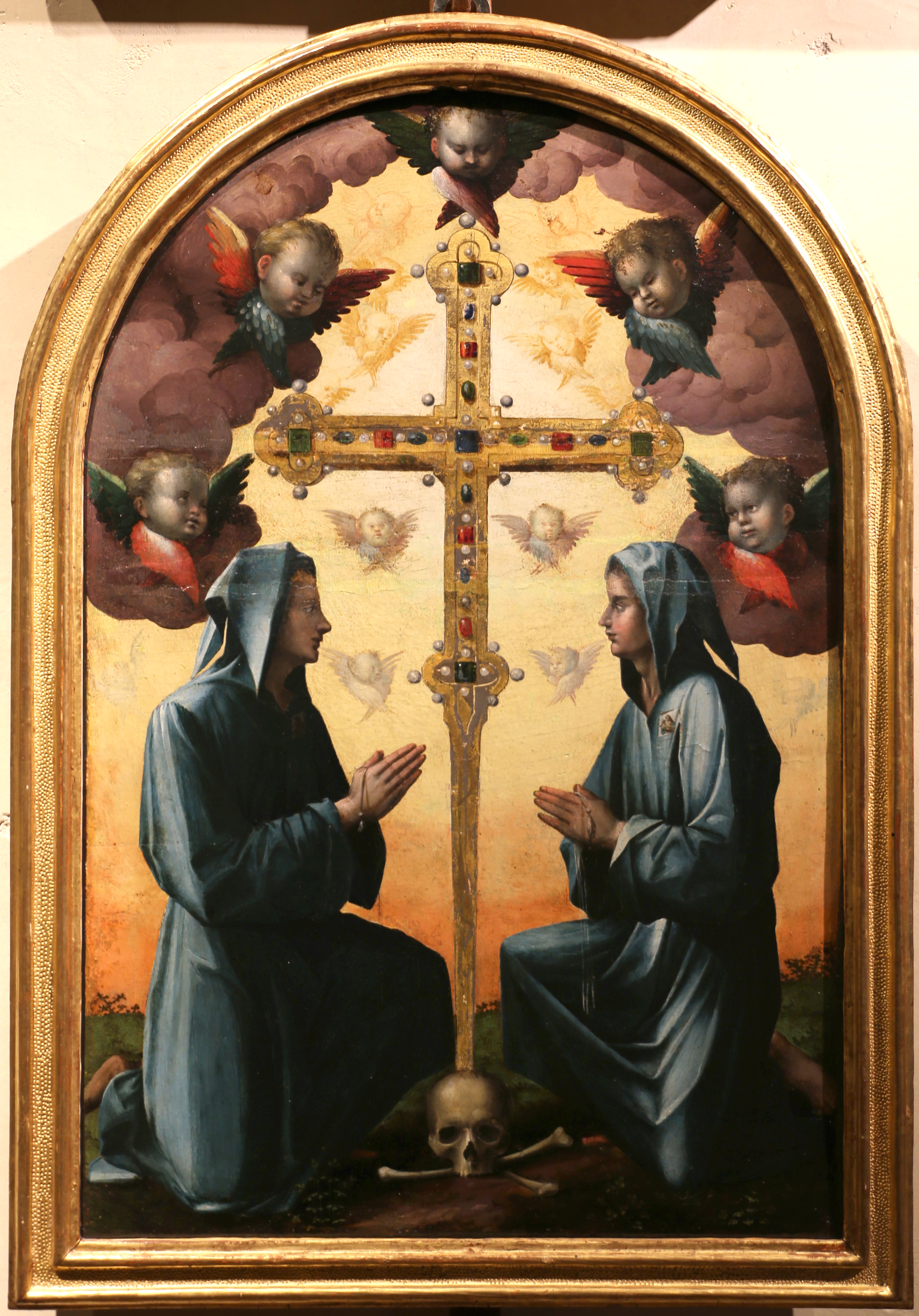
Panel from the Compagnia di Santa Maria in Portico at Fontegiusta, painted by Giorgio di Giovanni

Giorgio di Giovanni, also known as Giorgio da Siena (active 1538 and died 1559), was an Italian painter of the Renaissance period, active mainly in Siena.

== Biography ==
Little is known about the life of the painter. His works, for example the frescoes at the Castello di Belcaro, have also been attributed to Baldassare Peruzzi. Other works such as the Flight of Cloelia have been attributed to Domenico Beccafumi and Marco Bigio. Giorgio di Giovanni is known to have worked circa 1525–1530 on the Vatican Loggia in Rome along with Giovanni da Udine.
