= Palazzo Salimbeni =

Coordinates: 43°19′16.50″N 11°19′50.75″E

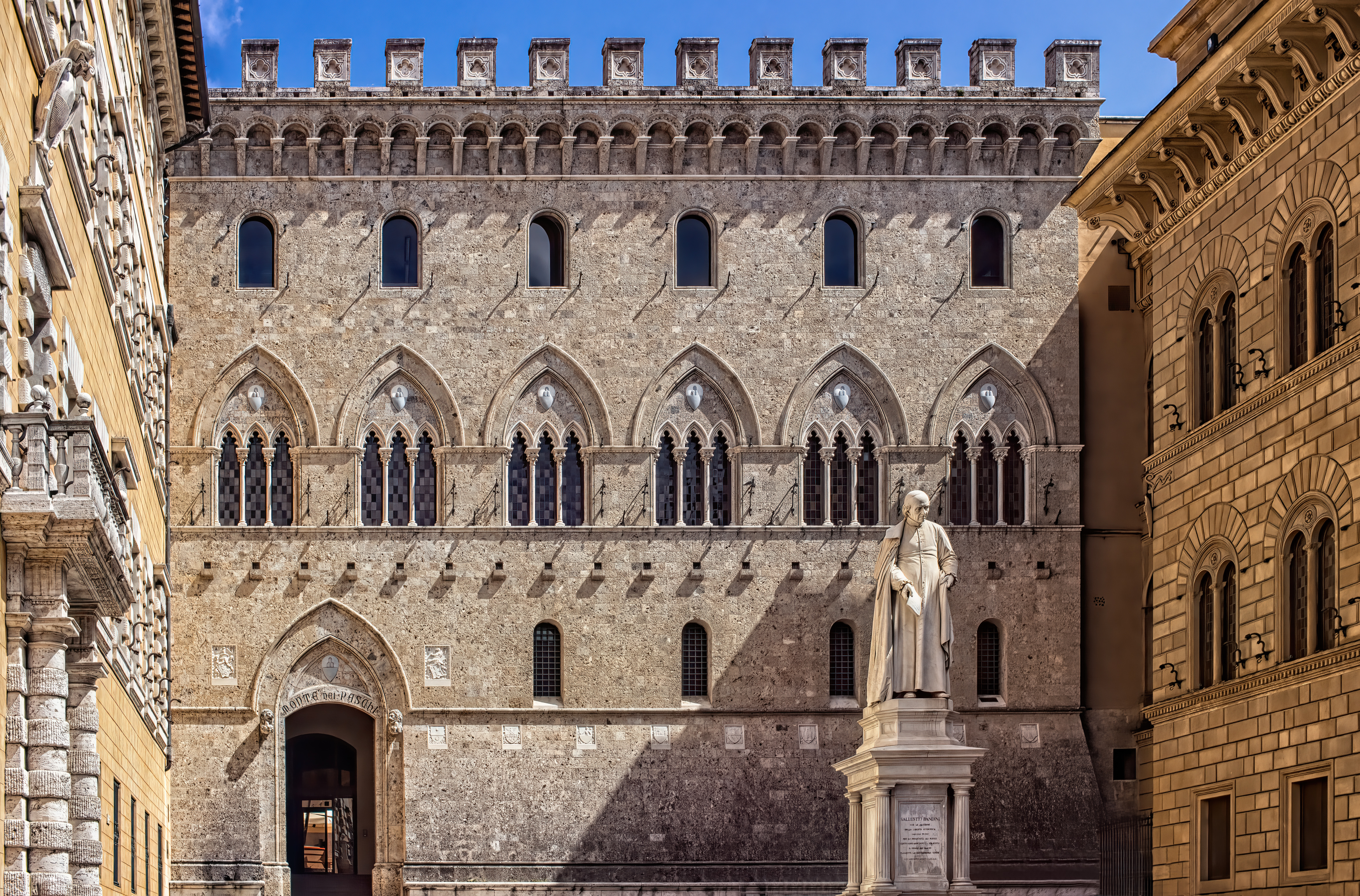
Palazzo Salimbeni.

Palazzo Salimbeni is a Gothic style urban palace located on the Piazza Salimbeni, just off Via Banchi di Sopra in the Terzo di Camollia of the city of Siena, region of Tuscany, Italy. The building, associated with an ancient mercantile family of Siena, currently houses the main offices of the Banca Monte dei Paschi di Siena, the oldest bank in the world.

== History ==
It was built in the 14th century, likely above pre-existing 12th-13th century structures. In the 19th century it was remodeled in neo-Gothic style, with detail including the merlons, the Lombard bands under them, the ogival triple mullioned windows, inspired by Siena's Palazzo Pubblico.

It was further renovated by architect Pierluigi Spadolini during the 20th century. It faces a square with a statue of the local religious figure Sallustio Bandini, dating to 1882. Neighboring palaces include the Palazzo Santucci (16th century). Facing Palazzo Salimbeni, to the right stands the Palazzo Spannocchi (1470), designed by Giuliano da Maiano. South along Via Banchi di Sopra are the Palazzo Bichi Ruspoli and Palazzo Tolomei.

== Sources ==
- F. Gurrieri, ed. (1988). La sede storica del Monte dei Paschi. Siena. pp. 167–189.
