= Tito Sarrocchi =

Italian sculptor (1824–1900)

Tito Sarrocchi (5 January 1824 – 1900) was an Italian sculptor.

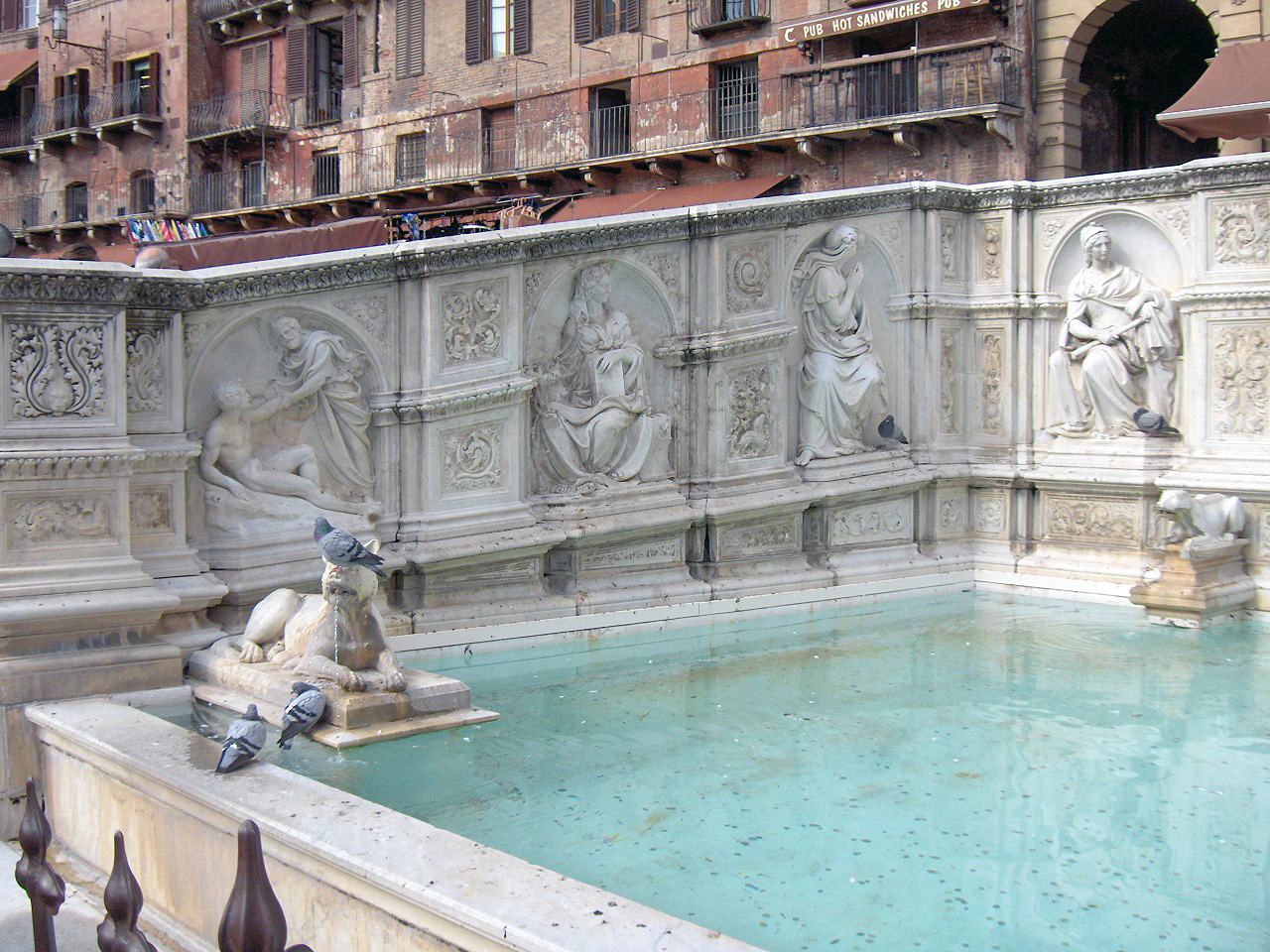
Fonte Gaia in Piazza del Campo, Siena.

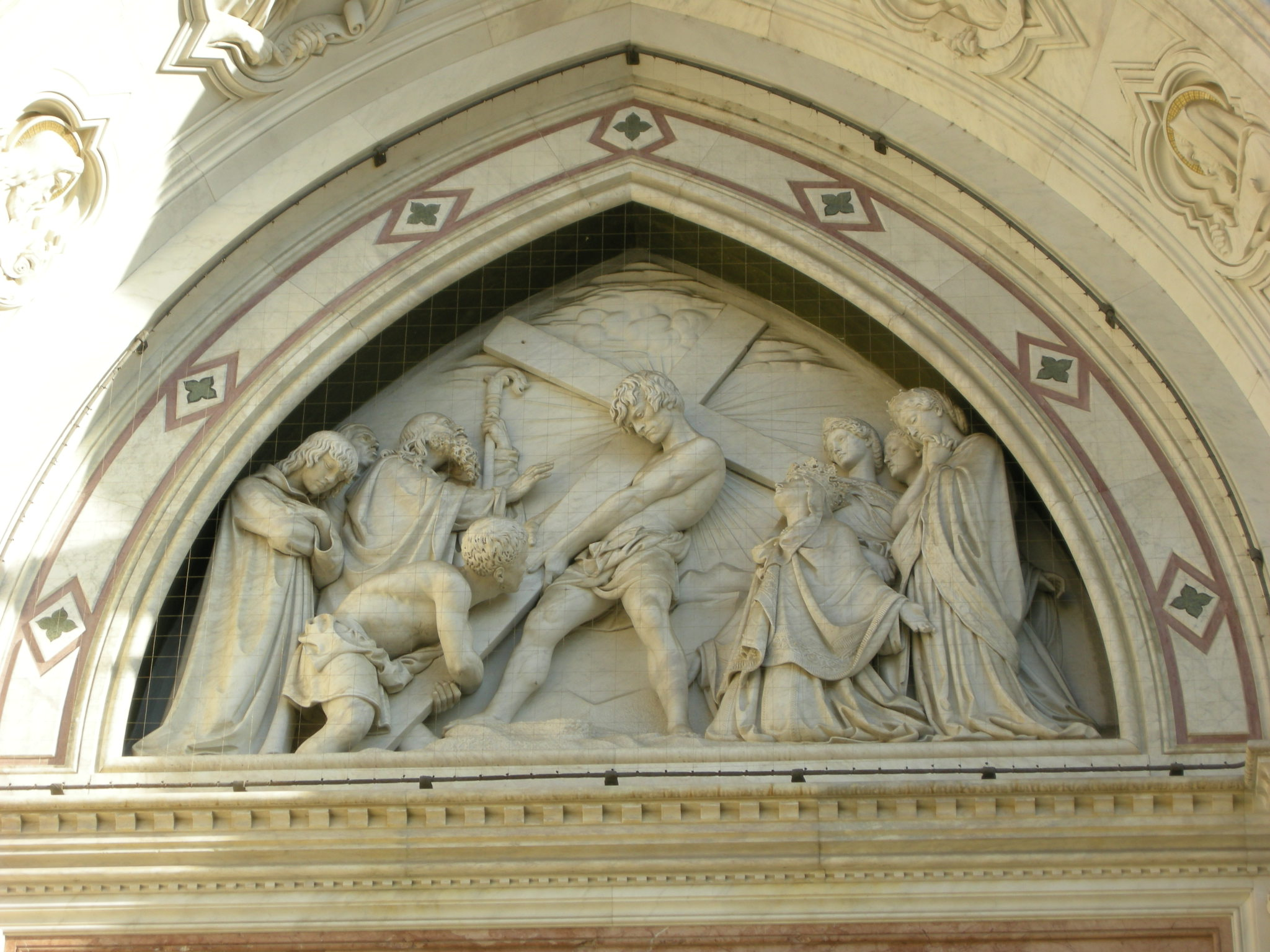
Façade at Santa Croce in Florence.

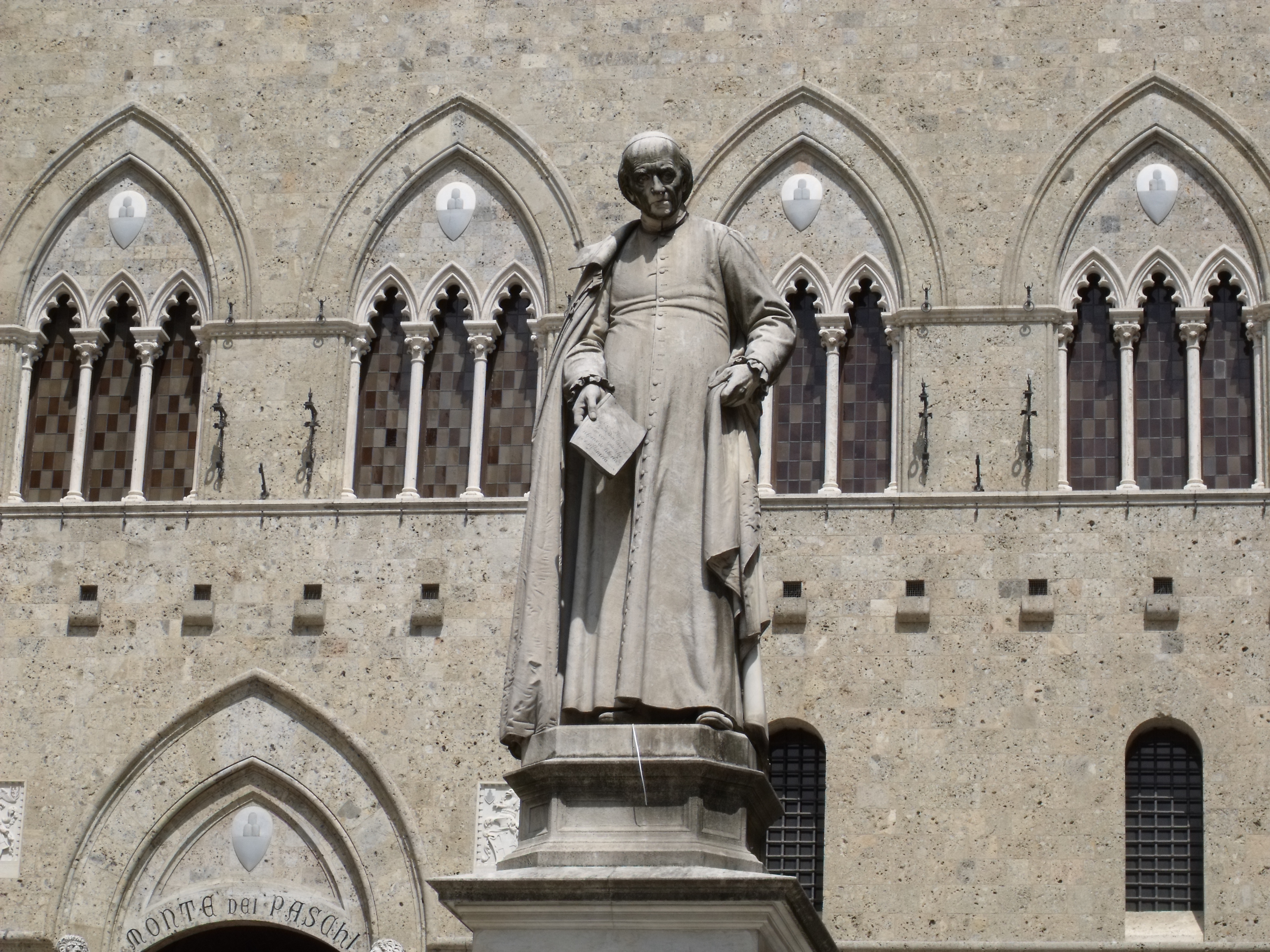
Statue of Sallustio Bandini.

== Biography ==
Sarrocchi was born at Siena to a humble family, as a boy was orphaned of mother. He had to help support his two sisters and his father, who had become nearly blind. At the age of thirteen, he began working under Antonio Manetti in the restoration of the facade of the Duomo of Siena. he also worked as a scenographer for a dance theater company.

In 1841 moved to Florence, where he initially worked for a marble and alabaster merchant, Leopoldo Pisani. But in his free time, he attended courses at the Academy of Fine Arts taught by Lorenzo Bartolini. He later worked as the chief assistant to Giovanni Duprè. He created his first independent work, The Bacchante (1852) before returning to Siena. On the recommendation of Duprè he was chosen in 1855 to complete the monument to Giuseppe Pianigiani in San Domenico, which had been started by Enea Becheroni.

Sarrocchi worked for ten years with Giuseppe Partini to replicate the early 15th-century sculptures at Jacopo della Quercia's Fonte Gaia. The piece was inaugurated in 1869 with the original, weather-damaged work being moved to local hospital turned museum Santa Maria della Scala. He would go on to complete several other restoration projects, working on Giovanni Pisano's sculptures in Pisa and again working with Partini on the restoration of Siena Cathedral. He created façades for Basilica of Santa Croce.

In 1880 Sarrocchi completed a public monument to Sallustio Bandini, standing at Piazza Salimbeni in Siena. Tombs sculpted by Sarrocchi can be found at the Monumental Cemetery of Bonaria, including Il Genio della Morte sculpted for Venturi Gallerini, Tobias buries a dead man for the Pozzesi family, three statues of the Theological Virtues for the Boninsegni, The vision of Ezekiel for the Placidi, and La Riconoscenza for the Bandini Piccolomini Family. He also sculpted the Figoli tomb at the Monumental Cemetery of Staglieno in Genoa. Sarrocchi's work was recognised in Paris when his First Prayer won a gold medal. San Giuseppe Hall in Santa Maria della Scala has an exhibition of around two hundred of Sarrocchi's plaster of Paris models. He donated the pieces to his home city in 1894. In Siena, he also sculpted a Civil Monument to those fallen in the wars of independence (intended for and once found in Piazza dell'Indipendenza but now moved to a park in San Prospero). and a statue of Sallustio Bandini for the piazza Salimbeni. He sculpted the relief placed over the facade of the church of Santa Croce, depicting the Invention of the Cross.

For the English Cemetery in Alexandria, Egypt, he made four figures, monuments to three sons of Cavalier Baker. For the cathedral of Massa Marittima, he sculpted a Gothic monument for monsignor Traversi, with three statues and a bas-relief. For the suburban cemetery of Pisa he made a monument for the Count Giuseppe Alliata and his son. For the cemetery of Modena he made the monument for the family of marchesi Campori, including a relief of La Morte al Sepolcro. The city of Acquapendente commissioned him a statue in honor of the anatomist Girolamo Fabrizio.

== Appointments and legacy ==
Sarrocchi taught sculpture to Cesare Maccari and Giuseppe Cassioli, designer of the Olympic Games medals. Sarrocchi was nominated by the King to be Officer of the Order of SS. Maurizio e Lazzaro and knight of the Order of the Crown of Italy. Wilhelm I of Germany offered him the Medal of the Crown of Prussia. He was a correspondent of the Accademia Fiorentina, honorary professor of that of Bologna, socio corrispondente of the Academy of Urbino; Merit Acacemic of the Academy of Perugia. Sarrocchi also completed two years serving the Giunta Superiore delle Belle Arti at the ministry of Public Education.
