= San Cristoforo, Siena =

Roman Catholic church in Tuscany, Italy

Coordinates: 43°19′13″N 11°19′54″E

San Cristoforo is a Roman Catholic church located on Piazza Tolomei in the Northern Terzo di Camollia and contrada of Civetta in the city of Siena, region of Tuscany, Italy. Across the piazza from the church is the Palazzo Tolomei, one of the oldest buildings in the city. The Tolomei for many years were associated with the church.

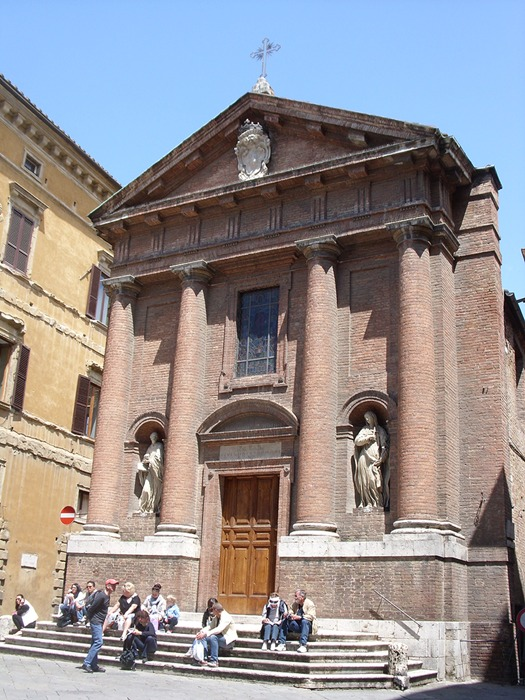
Facade

== History ==
The original Romanesque style church with a Latin Cross layout was initially constructed in the 11th to 12th-century. Traces of Romanesque columns remain in the adjacent small cloister.

During the 13th century, the cloister would host the council of the nascent Republic of Siena. It is claimed that at this site in 1260, a meeting took place between the Council of 24 and Florentine ambassadors. The latter demanded that Siena breach its walls, and allow Florentine fortresses in each Terzo. These heavy demands forced the former to decide that war with Florence was inevitable, and they dismissed the ambassadors, and prepared for war. They acknowledged the need to hire German mercenaries from Count Giordano d'Anglano, vicar of King Manfred, but lacked the funds. Upon hearing this, Salimbene Salimbeni, banker and founder of an early branch of the future Monte dei Paschi, merely walked to his nearby home, and returned to this cloister with the wheelbarrow full of 118,000 florins. The mercenaries proved essential to the Sienese victory at the Battle of Montaperti.

Also at this church, it is said that in 1376, Saint Catherine of Siena was able to force a reconciliation of a bitter feud between the Maconi and Tolomei/Rimaldini families. With the feuding parties present, she entered into a trance like extasis while in prayer at an altar.

The church underwent a number of modifications, most prominently after the earthquake of 1798. In 1800, a brick Neoclassical temple facade was added with four columns and tympanum, designed by Tommaso and Francesco Paccagnini. The niches flanking the entrance hold statues (1802) of Saint Bernardo Tolomei and the Blessed Nera Tolomei, works by Giuseppe Silini.

The church has a Madonna and child with St Luke and Romuald (circa 1508) by Girolamo del Pacchia, a fresco of the Pietà and the instruments of the Passion by Martino di Bartolomeo, and a marble sculptural group depicting the Glory of St Christopher (1693) by Giovanni Antonio Mazzuoli.

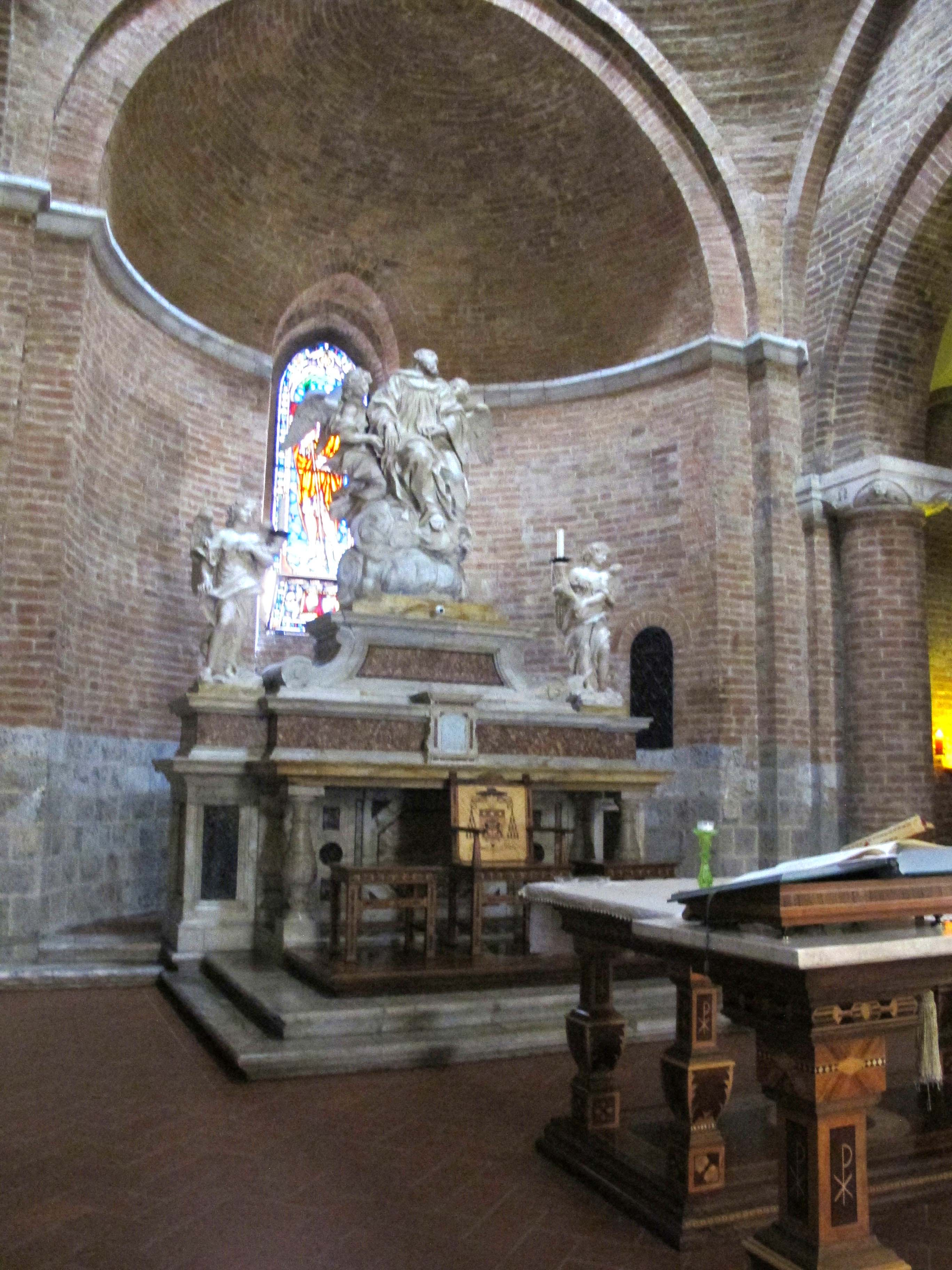
Glory of St Christopher

It now houses a Madonna and child by the 15th-century school of Della Robbia, a St George and the Dragon and a St Christopher attributed to either the Master of the Osservanza Triptych felt to be the same person as Sano di Pietro; and a tondo of the Madonna and child by the Master of San Pietro a Ovile.
