= Tuberculous dactylitis =

- Specialty: Infectious disease

Tuberculous dactylitis, also known as spina ventosa, is a skeletal manifestation of tuberculosis, one of the commonest forms of bacterial osteitis. It affects children more often than adults. The first radiological description of the condition is credited to Feilchenfeld in 1896; however, the first histological description was given by Rankin in 1886. The Swedish botanist and physician Carl von Linne was the first to mention the condition by the name spina ventosa (lit. inflated bone).

Multiple bones are involved in children and usually only a single bone is involved in adults suffering from tuberculous dactylitis. Tuberculous dactylitis affects the short tubular bones of the hands and feet in children. It often follows a mild course without fever and acute inflammatory signs as opposed to acute osteomyelitis. There may be a gap of a few months to 2 to 3 years from the time of initial infection to the point of diagnosis.

Nearly 85% of patients with spina ventosa are below 6 years of age. The bones of hands are more commonly involved than those of the feet. The proximal phalanx of the index and middle fingers are the commonest sites of involvement. Up to nearly 7% of children with pulmonary tuberculosis may develop this condition. Spread to the skeletal system is believed to occur via blood and lymphatics.

== Signs and symptoms ==
Swelling and skin discolouration seen along with lack of fever, erythema. In late stages sinus and abscess seen.

== Pathogenesis ==
In the pediatric age group, the marrow in the phalangeal bones are still active, a conducive place for the tuberculous bacilli to multiply. Slowly, the whole marrow space gets involved and this underlying granulomatous disease leads to expansion of the overlying soft cortex. Finally there is a fusiform dilation of the bone, with thinned out cortex and destruction of the marrow space leading to a balloon like shape; this cystic expansion of the bone is termed as spina ventosa.

== Diagnosis ==
The diagnosis of the condition is made on the basis of histological and bacteriological studies. Tuberculosis dactylitis may be confused with conditions like osteomyelitis, gout, sarcoidosis and tumors.

== Treatment ==
Spina ventosa is mainly treated conservatively. Most patients respond to anti tuberculosis treatment. The regimen consists of initial two months' intensive therapy with isoniazid, rifampicin, ethambutol and pyrazinamide followed by a six to twelve month course of isoniazid and rifampicin. Almost all the patients respond to medical therapy. Surgery is limited in curetting the bone cavities to promote early healing in cystic tuberculosis.
