= Sallustio Bandini =

Italian archdeacon, economist, and politician

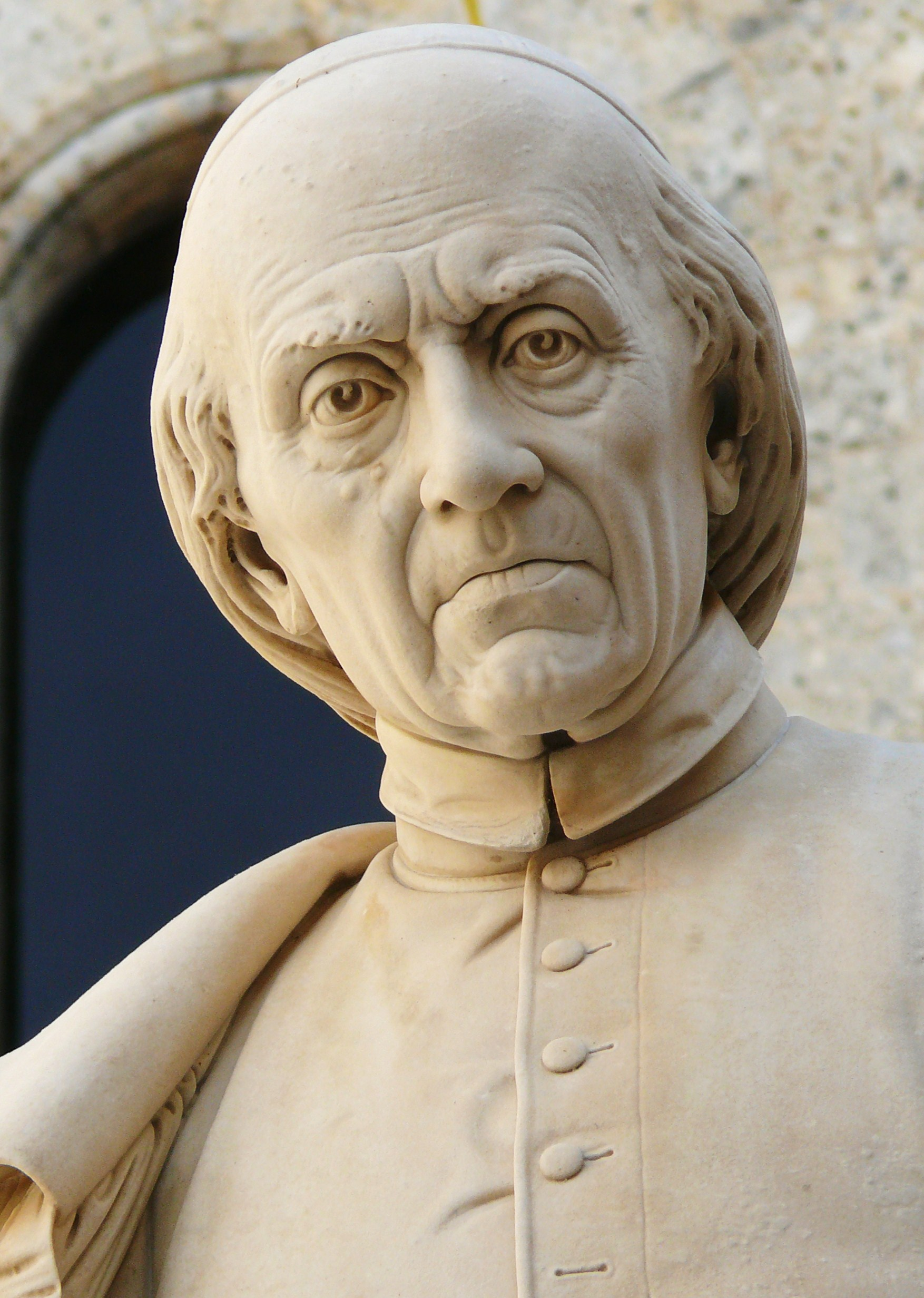
- Statue of Bandini in Piazza Salimbeni
- Born: April 19, 1677; Siena, Grand Duchy of Tuscany
- Died: 8 June 1760 (aged 83); Siena, Grand Duchy of Tuscany
- Occupations: Catholic priest; Economist; Politician
- Parent(s): Patrizio Bandini and Caterina Bandini (née Piccolomini)

Academic background
- Education: University of Siena

Academic work
- Discipline: Political economy
- Notable works: Discorso Economico sopra la Maremma di Siena

Sallustio Bandini (19 April 1677 – 8 June 1760) was an Italian archdeacon, economist, and politician.

He was an advocate of free trade, and removal of local feudal tariffs and tolls. He wrote an influential piece on this subject, titled Discorso Economico sopra la Maremma di Siena, published posthumously in 1775. Approximately two years before his death, Bandini donated his private library to the University of Siena, under the agreement that the almost 3000 volumes would be made publicly available. From this donation the Biblioteca della Sapienza was formed, now known as Biblioteca Comunale degli Intronati.

== Early life ==
Bandini was born Sallustio Antonio Bandini in Siena to a prominent local family. His father was Patrizio Bandini and his mother was Caterina Piccolomini di Modanella, a member of the influential Piccolomini nobility. He was their third son. Brought up as a soldier, he preferred retiring into the country and giving himself up to agriculture. In 1705, he took holy orders, and became an archdeacon in 1723. He was president of the Accademia dei Fisiocritici, a learned society intended to promote natural sciences rather than literature.

== Works ==
In 1737, he wrote his famous essay on the Sienese marshes, Discorso Economico, offered in manuscript to the grand-duke Francis II in 1739; but not printed till 1775 (Prima edizione di Firenze per Gaetano Cambiagi stampator granducale), fifteen years after Bandini’s death. A second edition was issued by Pietro Custodi, Scrittori classici italiani di economia politica, Milan, 1803, Parte moderna, Tomo I. Bandini’s essay contains the following leading principles of political economy. (1) “Human nature gives its best when it can act unfettered; consequently, the fewer and simpler the laws the better.” — (2) As a corollary from the preceding principle, “abolition of all vexatious taxes and reduction of state officials to a minimum.” — (3) Abolition of laws regulating prices; “if proprietors and peasants grow rich through high prices of agricultural produce, so much the better for the consumers, because more produce will be produced for them.” — (4) “The want of commercial and industrial liberty causes famines.” — (5) “ Laws against monopolies (natural) and corners are based on prejudices.” — (6) Rapidity and facility of exchange, not abundance of money, are the causes of wealth. — (7) A single tax is easier and cheaper for all parties concerned than a great many; it ought to be imposed on land and farmed out.

The Sienese marshes, which Bandini hoped to reclaim by the adoption of these maxims, constitute the lower part of the province of Siena and about two-fifths of the whole of Tuscany. His maxims, neglected by Francis, inspired the policy of the grand-duke Peter Leopold of Tuscany, but the Maremma benefited by it only after the granduke had charged the mathematician Leonardo Ximenes to investigate the hydrostatical problems of the case, and received a favourable report upon Bandini’s suggestions.

== Legacy ==
Bandini is memorialised for his enlightened discourse on economics with a statue in the centre of Siena's Piazza Salimbeni, by the main entrance to Banca Monte dei Paschi di Siena, who commissioned the work. The statue was completed by Italian sculptor Tito Sarrocchi in 1880, more than a century after Bandini's death.

== Works ==
- Discorso economico scritto dall'arcidiacono Salustio Antonio Bandini patrizio senese nell'anno 1737 e pubblicato dopo la di lui morte seguita nel 1760. Florence: Gaetano Cambiagi. 1775.

== Bibliography ==
- Pantaleoni, Maffeo (1894). "Bandini, Sallustio Antonio". Dictionary of Political Economy. Vol. 1. London: Macmillan and Company. p. 91.
- Mirri, Mario (1963). "BANDINI, Sallustio Antonio". Dizionario Biografico degli Italiani (in Italian). Vol. 5: Bacca–Baratta. Rome: Institute of the Italian Encyclopaedia. OCLC 883370.
- Fanfani, Amintore (1929). "Il "Discorso sulla Maremma Senese" di Sallustio Bandini". Rivista Internazionale di Scienze Sociali e Discipline Ausiliarie. 2 (1/2): 123–36. JSTOR 41618543.
