= Palazzo Tolomei =

Urban palace in Siena, Italy

Coordinates: 43°19′12″N 11°19′52″E

The Palazzo Tolomei is an imposing, Gothic style urban palace, located on Via Banchi di Sopra in the present contrada of Civetta, Terzo di Camollia of the city of Siena, region of Tuscany, Italy.

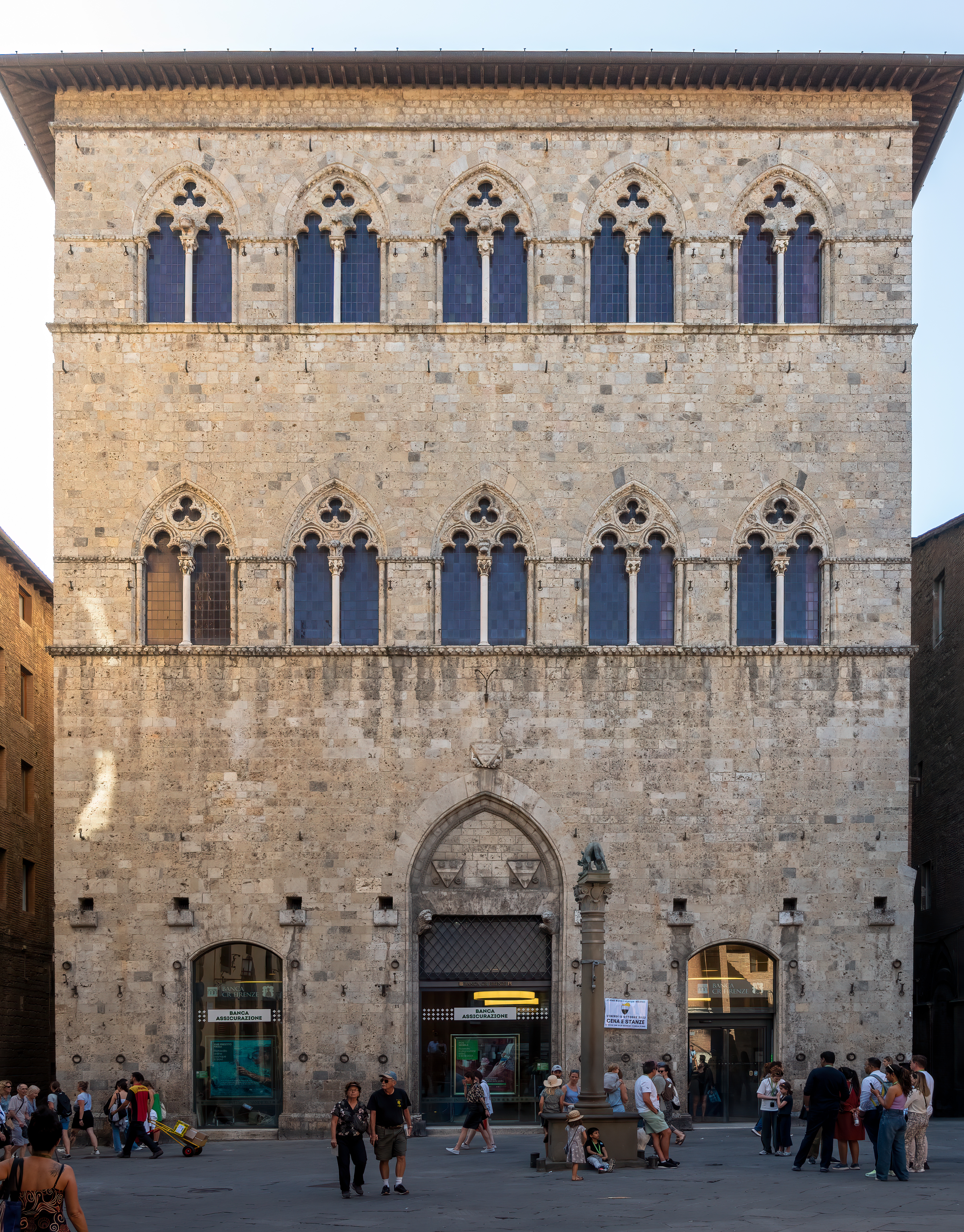
Facade of Palazzo Tolomei

== History ==
The building is one of the oldest palaces in the city and was erected between 1270 and 1275 by the Tolomei family. It served as the first permanent headquarters of the Sienese commune during the early years of the Guelph era, before the construction of the Palazzo Pubblico in the Piazza del Campo, and it also functioned as a bank and private residence. It stands on the west side of the Piazza Tolomei, across from the church of San Cristoforo. The aristocratic Tolomei family for many years was associated with this parish church. On the Via Banchi di Sopra, it is a few houses south and across the street of the Palazzo Bichi Ruspoli, a few blocks north of the Piazza del Campo.

The original palace of this Guelph aristocratic family was mostly destroyed by Ghibelline mobs in 1267 but was rebuilt in its current form shortly after the new Guelph regime came to power. The stone palace, with its tall first floor and mullioned windows with trefoil decoration in upper floors, was restored in the 1960s and is now home to Banca CR Firenze.

Among the most notable members of the Tolomei family was Pia Tolomei, who lived in the thirteenth century. In 1295, however, she was supposedly murdered by her Guelph husband from the Maremma, who wished to remarry. Her story was popular in the 19th century as a symbol of faithfulness to principles in the face of treachery and self-interest. Gaetano Donizetti made her the subject of his tragic opera, Pia de' Tolomei. She was initially immortalized by Dante, who encounters her in Purgatory:

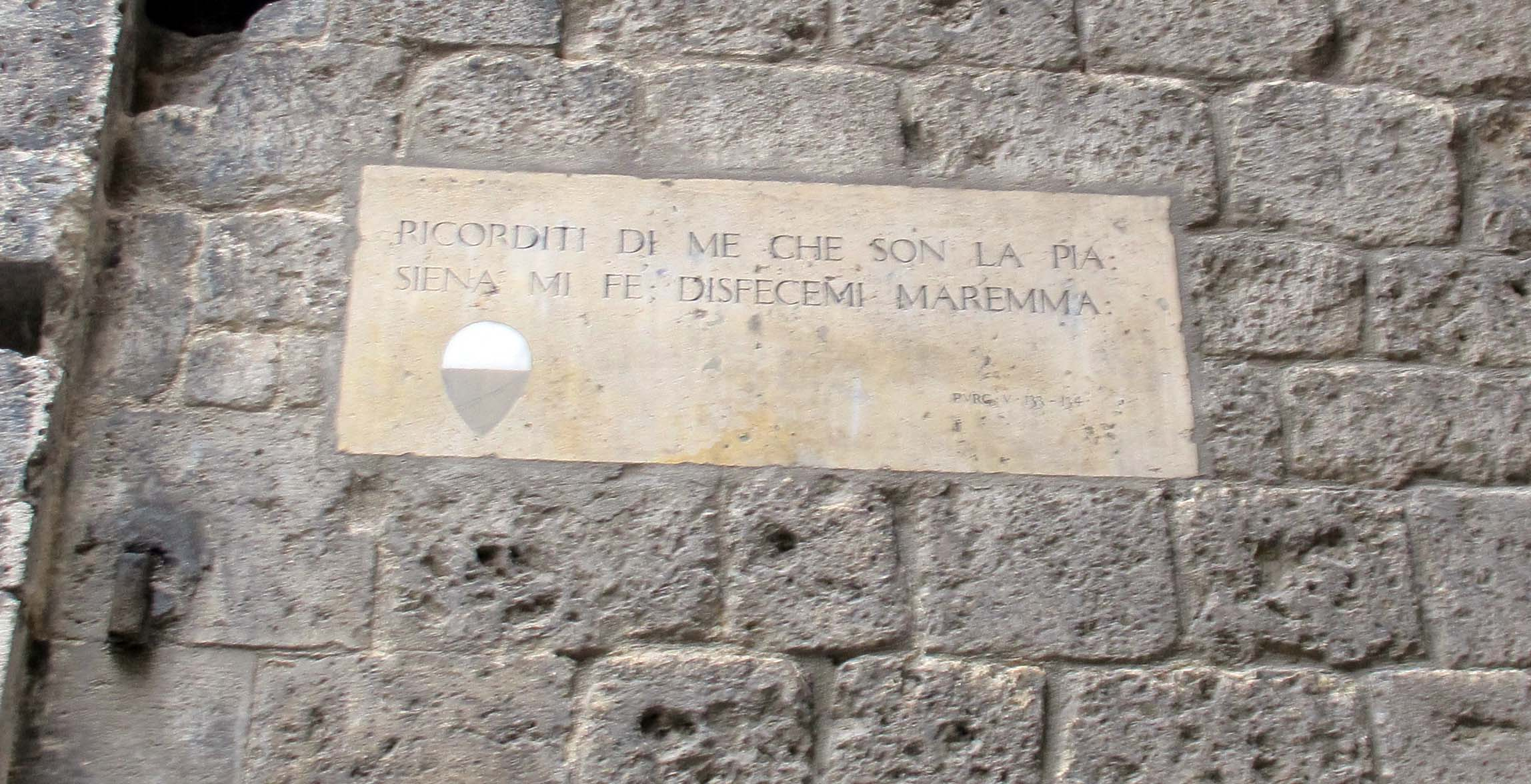
Plaque on palace wall

Ricorditi di me, che son la Pia:
Siena mi fe', disfecemi Maremma:
Salsi colui che innanellata pria,
Disposato m'avea con la sua gemma.

Remember me, who am the Pia;
Siena made me, but the Maremma unmade me:
He who had engaged with his ring me first,
Disposed of me from his jewel.

The Tolomei family also bore Saint Bernardo Tolomei and the Blessed Nera Tolomei, memorialized in the facade of the church of San Cristoforo. In front of the palace stands a column crowned with a Roman She-wolf.
