= Bettino Marchetti =

Italian architect (1867–1935)

- Born: 8 July 1867; Siena, Kingdom of Italy
- Died: 1 February 1935 (aged 67); Siena, Kingdom of Italy
- Occupation: Architect

Bettino Marchetti (8 July 1867 – 1 February 1935) was an Italian architect and restorer mainly active in Tuscany, known for his work on civic buildings, theaters, schools, and restoration of historic palaces.

== Life and career ==
Bettino Marchetti was born in Siena, Italy, in 1867, the son of architect Pietro. He studied at the local Academy of Fine Arts from 1883 to 1888, earning his architect degree. Early in his career, he designed the Sapori family chapel at the cemetery of Misericordia (1891) and the Teatro del Popolo in Rapolano Terme (1895). In 1898 he proposed workers' housing in Siena, inspiring later urban renewal projects.

In the early 20th century, Marchetti designed projects for his contrada, the Oca, including the Sala delle Vittorie (1902) and renovated a building to serve as its headquarters. He executed numerous restorations and public works, including the Buonconvento nursery school (1908–1911), the Costone theater, Saint Peter Anglican Church in Siena, and restorations of the Pinacoteca in Palazzo Buonsignori and Palazzo Brigidi (1921). Other projects included a FIAT garage in San Prospero (1922), the Accademia dei Rozzi extension (1925), and the Banca di Credito Toscano renovation in Piazza Tolomei (1927).

Marchetti served on the Siena municipal building commission (1915–1932), taught at the Accademia di Belle Arti, and was secretary of the local Fascist architects' union from 1933. He died in Siena in 1935, receiving public funeral honors.

== Selected works ==
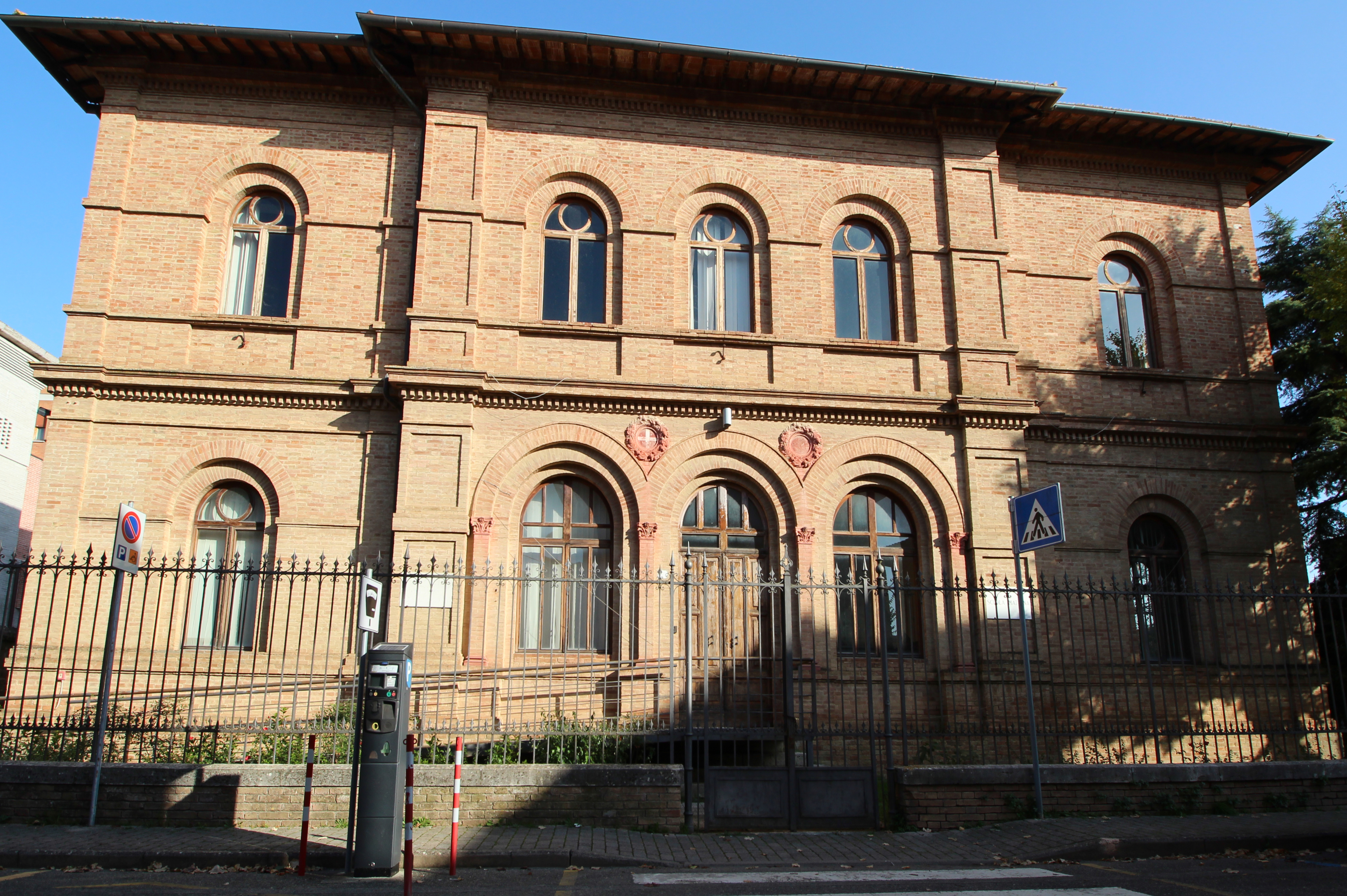
Buonconvento nursery school

- Sapori family chapel, Cemetery of Misericordia, Siena (1891)
- Teatro del Popolo, Rapolano Terme (1895)
- Nursery school, Buonconvento (1908–1911)
- Sala delle Vittorie, Contrada dell'Oca, Siena (1902)
- Restoration of Pinacoteca in Palazzo Buonsignori and Palazzo Brigidi (1921)
- FIAT garage, San Prospero, Siena (1922)
- Accademia dei Rozzi extension, Siena (1925)
- Banca di Credito Toscano in Palazzo Bandini, Piazza Tolomei, Siena (1927)

== Sources ==
- Dei, M. (2010). "Bettino Marchetti". In Quattrocchi, Luca (ed.). Architettura nelle terre di Siena. La prima metà del Novecento. Cinisello Balsamo: Silvana. pp. 221–224.
- Maramai, G.; Marini, M. (1984). "Bettino Marchetti". In Franchina, Letizia (ed.). Il Liberty a Buonconvento. Siena: Periccioli. pp. 75–76.
- Petreni, G., ed. (2000). L'archivio della Nobile Contrada dell'Oca. Inventario. Siena. pp. 90–91.
