= Santuccio Church, Siena =

Roman Catholic church in Siena, Italy

Coordinates: 43.315405°N 11.339702°E

Church of the Santuccio
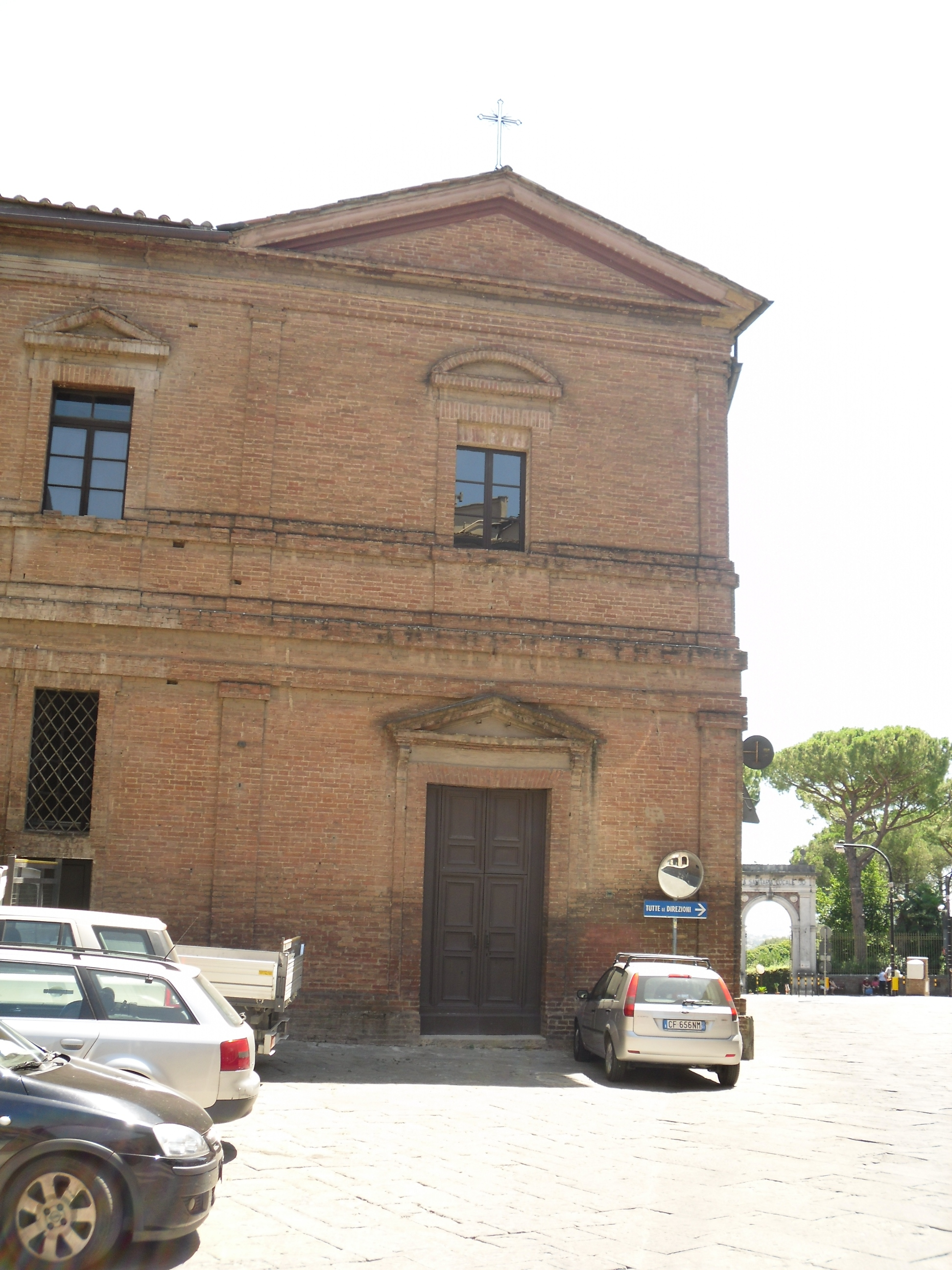

Religion
- Affiliation: Roman Catholic

Location
- Interactive map of Church of the Santuccio

The Church of the Santuccio or Chiesa del Santuccio, is a small, Renaissance-style, Roman Catholic church located on Via Roma 69 in Siena, Italy. The church was once was part of the adjacent monastery of Santa Maria degli Angeli, occupied since 1362 by Augustinian nuns. The frescoed church is not part of the Polo Museale della Toscana, an association of museums of the Tuscan region.

== History and description ==
The façade by Annibale Bichi, also the benefactor, recalls works by Baldassarre Peruzzi. Other patrons were the Santucci family, hence the name. The convent survived a series of suppressions starting in the 18th-century through the late 19th century. Nuns from other monasteries congregated here. In the early 20th century, the few remaining nuns moved out, and the adjacent convent is used as a professional school.

The interior houses a major altarpiece, a Madonna and Child with Saints, one of the last works of Francesco Vanni who died in 1610, continued by his half-brother, Ventura Salimbeni, who died in 1613, and only finally completed by Sebastiano Folli in 1614. The fresco decorations of the lateral walls were painted by Ventura Salimbeni, and depict episodes in the Life of San Galgano (1614). St Galgano was a soldier who became an eremitic monk. The church once sheltered a silver reliquary, by Pace di Valentino, putatively containing relics of the saint; it is now in the diocesan museum of the Cathedral. The canvas depicting St Cecilia at the organ (early 1600s) is attributed to Antonio Buonfigli. The fresco with an Angelic concert (1613) was painted by Salimbeni. The organ from the church dates to 1531.
