= Piazza Indipendenza, Siena =

Square in Siena, Italy

Piazza Indipendenza
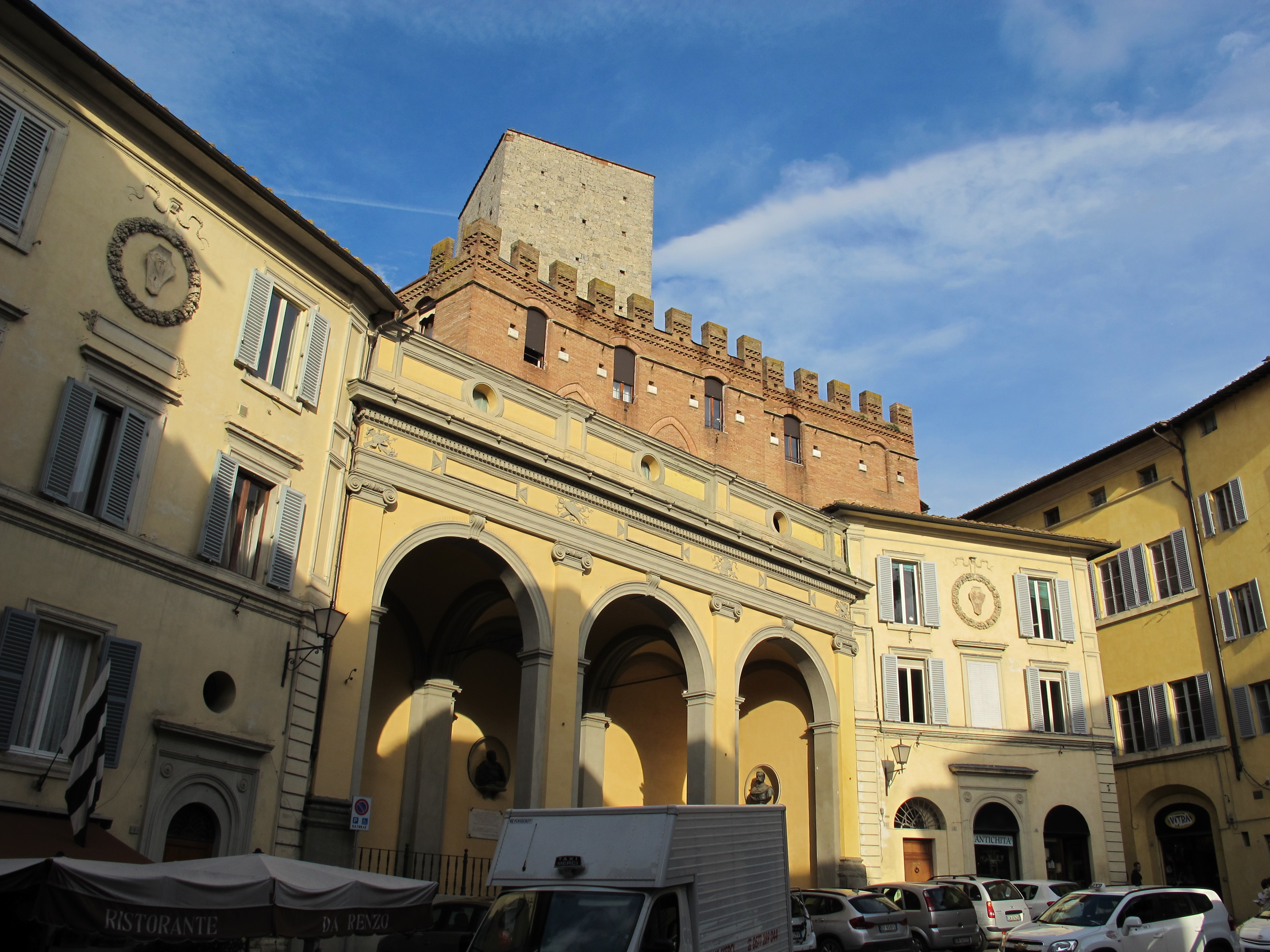
- Loggia and Palazzo Ballati in Piazza Indipendenza

- Location within Tuscany
- Location: Siena, Tuscany, Italy
- Coordinates: 43°19′09″N 11°19′49″E

The Piazza dell'Indipendenza is located just north of Piazza del Campo in the Terzo di Camollia in the city of Siena, region of Tuscany, Italy. It is located centrally at the intersection of Via delle Terme and dei Termini, about two blocks Northwest of the Piazza del Campo.

== History ==
The Piazza was only formalized in the 19th century with the addition of a tall loggia (1887) designed by Archimede Vestri. Behind the loggia is screened the medieval Palazzo Ballati with its tall crenelated tower.

In number 15 Piazza Indipendenza is the Teatro dei Rozzi designed in 1816 by Alessandro Doveri and enlarged in 1874. The piazza itself was enlarged in the early 19th century by demolition of the church of San Pellegrino; hence it was previously called Piazza San Pellegrino.

In 1875, a monument for the fallen in the wars of Italian Independence was commissioned by the Province of Siena from Tito Sarrocchi to stand in front of the Loggia. The completed statue depicts an allegory of Italy as a woman holding a scepter in the left arm and a wreath in the right, about to lay the wreath upon a dying lion at its feet, with a crown strewn on the ground. The base of the statue states “Ai prodi senesi per me caduti” and was inaugurated in 1879.

The statue was contentious since its installation, in part because the dying lion was felt to be inauspicious for a nascent nation, or perhaps anti-royal or anti-Florentine inferences could be drawn from the elements of the fallen lion and crown. Ultimately, after extensive debate, the statue was moved to a small forlorn park in San Prospero between via Fruschelli and via Pannilunghi. There is more parking now in the Piazza Indipendenza.

== Bibliografia ==
- Toscana. Guida d'Italia (Guida rossa), Touring Club Italiano, Milano 2003. ISBN 88-365-2767-1
- Derived in part from Italian Wikipedia.
