= Fortezza Medicea (Siena) =

Fortress in Siena, Italy

Coordinates: 43°19′19.78″N 11°19′24.20″E

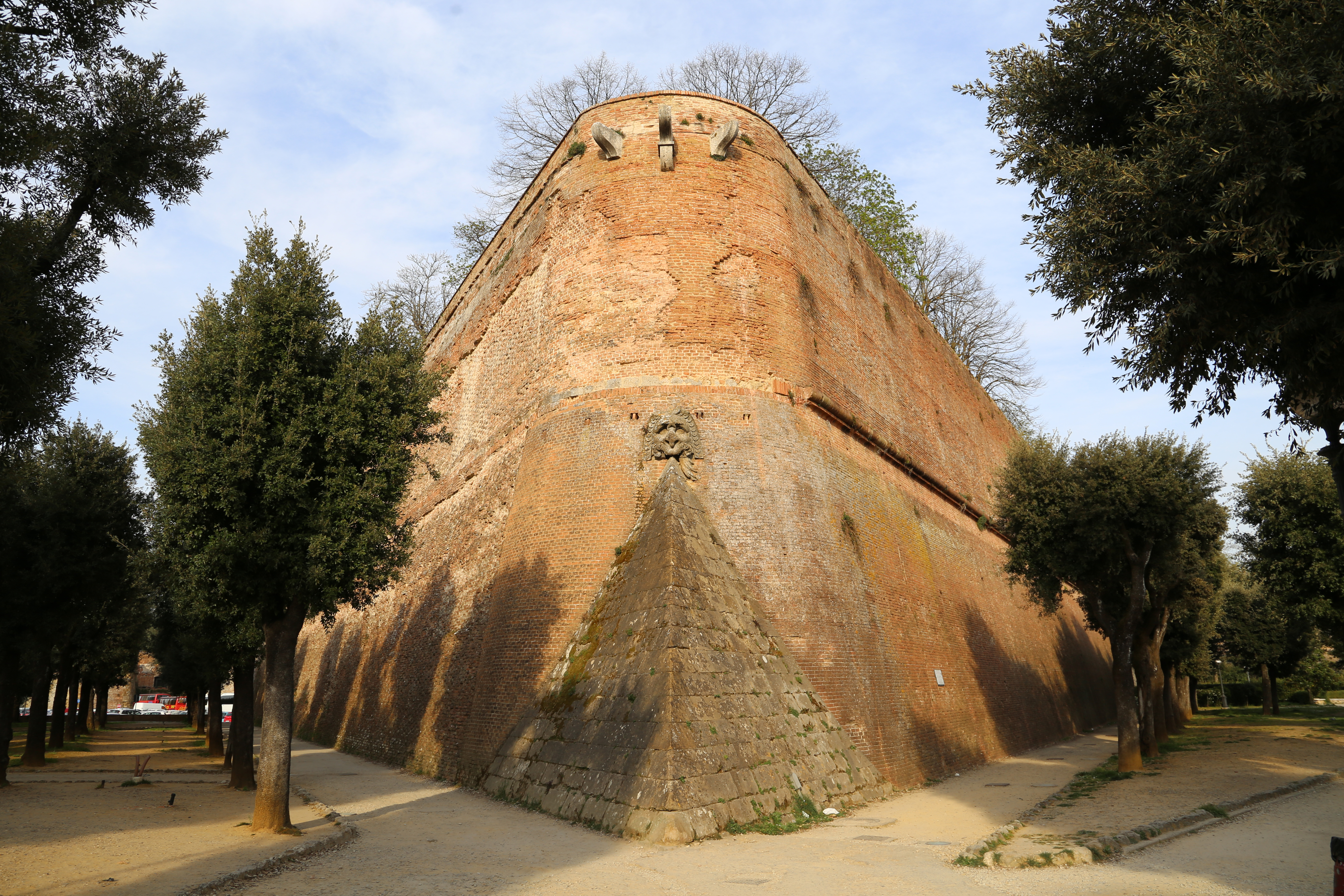
The west bastion

Siena’s Fortezza Medicea (the Medici Fortress sometimes called the Fort of Saint Barbara) is a fort built in the city between 1561 and 1563 on the orders of Duke Cosimo, a few years before he became the first Grand Duke of Tuscany.

The fortress is positioned on the northern edge of the central Siena in the Terzo of Camollia, next to the neighborhood of San Prospero, and since 1923 has overlooked the city's Artemio Franchi/Montepaschi Arena.

== History ==
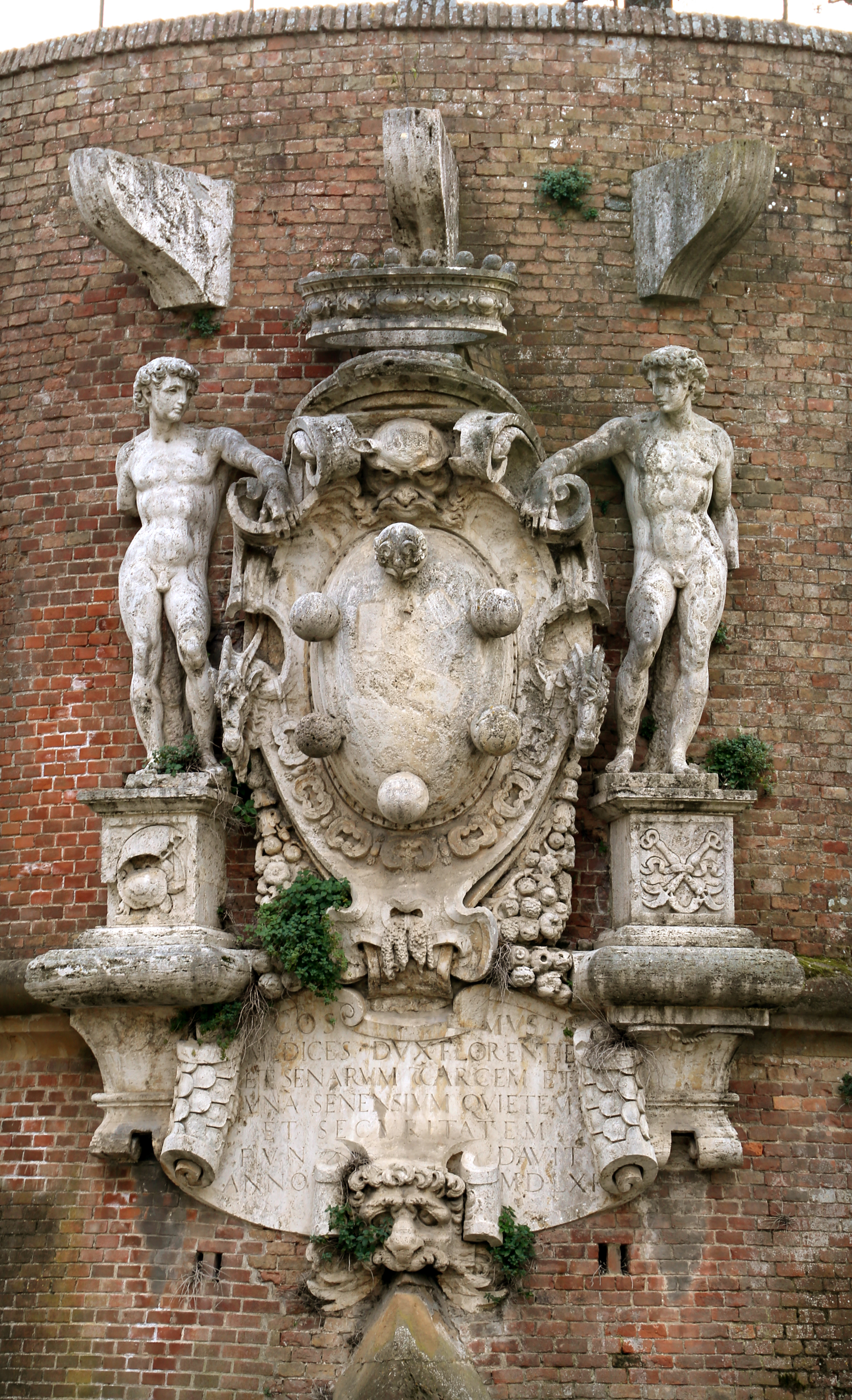
Coat of Arms of Cosimo I de' Medici between two heroic figures, by Francesco Camilliani

Construction of the fortress followed the Battle of Marciano which in 1554 marked the final defeat of Siena by its long-standing rival, Florence. It was located on the site of a previous fort, known as the Cittadella/Citadel, which had been built in 1548 on the orders of the Emperor Charles V after the city came under the control of Spain, subjected to the authority of the Spanish ambassador, Diego Hurtado de Mendoza.

On 26 July 1552 the Sienese rose up against the Spanish, expelling them from the city and destroying the Citadel/Cittadella.

Slightly less than three years later, on 21 April 1555, after more than a year under siege by Spanish and Tuscan troops, the city surrendered. The Republic of Siena, supported by its French allies, continued to defy the Spanish from Montalcino, but the city of Siena itself was now back under Spanish control. Four years later, in April 1559, the Peace of Cateau-Cambrésis was signed between France and Spain. This left the Republic of Siena without allies and led to total surrender. The city fell under the control of Spain's regional ally, the Florentine Duke Cosimo.

In order to prevent any attempt by the Sienese to recover their independence, Cosimo ordered the construction of the present fortress on the site of the earlier Spanish Citadel. The project was entrusted to Cosimo's celebrated Urbino born architect, Baldassarre Lanci who had started his career as a military engineer. Construction commenced in 1561 and was completed just two years later in 1563.

The fortress was demilitarized only at the end of the eighteenth century, at which point it became part of the city's public life. In 1937, following a major restoration, the fortress was transformed into its present condition as a public park. It houses an Enoteca (a commercial center focused on the local wine industry) and frequently hosts art exhibitions. It is also used for festivals and concerts and is home to the Siena Jazz foundation.

== Structure ==
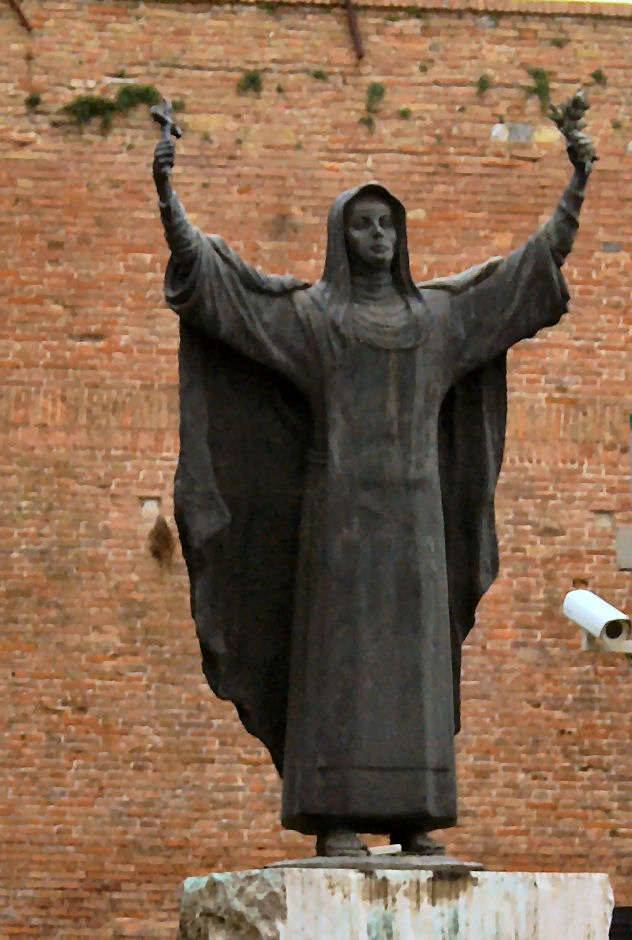
Statue of Saint Catherine of Siena, facing towards the city

Originally built on an L-shaped footprint, the fortress was subsequently transformed into its current rectangular form. On each of the four corners is an imposing brick built rampart, and on three of these the Medici coat of arms stands above the head of a lion. On the fourth, south facing corner, however, there is only the head of a lion.

The fortress is a substantial structure, with internal dimensions of approximately 180 by 125 meters and external dimensions of about 270 by 200 meters. If the outer wall is included, the structure has an external perimeter of approximately 1,500 meters.

The entrance is on the north-east side, facing Florence, and now close to the gardens of La Lizza. On the inside the hugely wide walls are topped with broad paths, lined with trees and benches. Within the walls a permanent theatre-shaped structure has now been created in order to support the public role of the fortress.

On the outside, the fortress is positioned between the city's stadium and the Lizza Gardens. On the south-east side, which faces the city, a statue of the city's saint, Catherine of Siena, has recently been erected.
