= Agenore Socini =

Italian architect and urban planner (1859–1926)

- Born: 25 August 1859; Siena, Kingdom of Sardinia
- Died: 16 July 1926 (aged 66); Querceto, Sesto Fiorentino, Province of Florence, Kingdom of Italy
- Occupations: Architect, urban planner

Agenore Socini (25 August 1859 – 16 July 1926) was an Italian architect and urban planner, known mainly for his works in Siena and Tuscany during the late 19th and early 20th centuries.

== Life and career ==
Born in Siena, Socini studied at the city's Institute of Art from 1876 and specialized in architecture. From 1884 he worked under architect Giuseppe Partini, becoming his assistant and collaborator. Among their early projects was the restoration of Castello di Brolio for Baron Bettino Ricasoli, carried out between 1880 and 1894.

After Partini's death in 1895, Socini continued his master's work and became architect of the Opera della Metropolitana of Siena. He directed numerous restoration projects, including works on the Basilica of Santa Maria dei Servi, Siena Cathedral, and the Baptistery of San Giovanni. Between 1895 and 1902 he supervised around thirty building sites in Siena, including the church of Sant'Elisabetta della Visitazione, the Santa Caterina Institute, and the bell tower of the church of San Giacomo.

In 1900, while serving as municipal councillor for public works in Siena, Socini proposed an urban expansion plan for the San Prospero area. In 1902 he became director of the regional office for monument preservation in Florence and later served as superintendent for monuments of Florence (1910). He also taught architecture at the Accademia delle Arti del Disegno, becoming its president in February 1913.

His later activities included participation in the technical commission studying the structural problems of the Leaning Tower of Pisa (1912) and the restoration of Barberino di Mugello Castle, including the creation of a Renaissance-style Italian garden (1915).

Socini died on 16 July 1926 at his villa in Querceto, Sesto Fiorentino, and was buried at the Monumental Cemetery of Antella.

== Selected publications ==
- Relazione e progetti per la facciata ed il campanile della basilica di San Francesco in Siena (1895)
- Un'antica questione relativa alle fondazioni del Duomo di Pienza (1909)
- Di un antico finestrone ritrovato in un muro del Duomo di Siena (1910)
- Discorso del Prof. Arch. Agenore Socini letto in occasione della distribuzione dei premi per l'anno scolastico 1910-1911 (1912)
- Stato di conservazione del Campanile, in Relazioni compilate dalla commissione tecnica per lo studio delle condizioni presenti del Campanile di Pisa (1913)

== Sources ==
- Lusini, Vittorio (1901). Il San Giovanni di Siena e i suoi restauri diretti da Agenore Socini. Florence: Fratelli Alinari.
- Pozzana, Mariachiara; Salomone, Stefano (1999). Il castello di Barberino di Mugello. La storia, l'architettura, il giardino. Florence: L. S. Olschki.
- Quattrocchi, Luca (2010). Architettura nelle terre di Siena. La prima metà del Novecento. Cinisello Balsamo: Silvana.
- Sisi, Carlo; Spalletti, Enrico (1994). La cultura artistica a Siena nell'Ottocento. Siena: Amilcare Pazzi-Monte dei Paschi di Siena.
