= Andrea Vanni =

Italian painter (1332 – c. 1414)

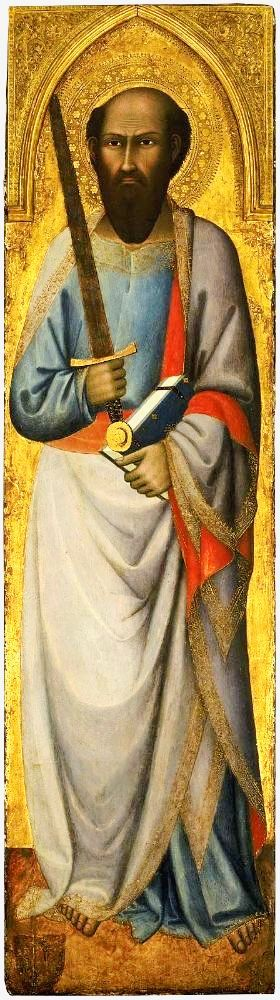
Saint Paul by Vanni

Andrea Vanni (1332 – c. 1414) was an Italian painter of the early Renaissance, active mainly in his native Siena.

== Biography ==
Vanni was born in about 1332 in Siena. The first notice of him as a painter comes from 1353 when he was associated with Bartolo di Fredi, though it is uncertain if Vanni was a painter or assistant. His last activities date around 1400 and scholars have put his death to be around 1414 (although no documentary evidence). He was also involved in the foundation of the new government of Siena in 1368 and for twenty years held several different offices, including being elected to Great Council in 1370, Gonfaloniero in 1371, and sent on Envoys to the Pope in 1372 and again in 1384.

== Works ==
Vanni is less known than his contemporaries. He appears influenced by his fellow Sienese Simone Martini and Pietro Lorenzetti. In Siena, only one work by his hand remains: an Enthroned Madonna in the transept of S. Francesco. Prior to 2002, there was also a painting of St. Paul in the Palazzo Pubblico but it was acquired by the Boston Museum of Fine Arts in the form of a gift from Mrs. W. Scott Fitz. Additional works to his credit are a portrait of St. Catherine of Siena (who was rumored to be a relative of his), located in the church of San Domenico to commemorate the life of the saint, and a fragmented Crucifixion which was originally housed in the church of Alborino and is now in the Istituto delle Belle Arti. Around 1400, Vanni painted another portrait of St. Catherine with scenes from the life of St. James in the chapel in San Jacomo Intercisco, but these works have disappeared.There is also a painting by Andrea Vanni in the Isabella Stewart Gardner Art Museum in Boston("Crucifixion With Saints").

== Polyptych of S. Stefano ==
Vanni's most famous work is a polyptych in the church of Santo Stefano alla Lizza. The central panel contains a portrait of the Virgin and Child notable for the "silhouette-like character of the design". The Madonna is set like a dark pattern against the gold background of her throne. There is almost no attempt at chiaroscuro except around the face and hands which gives the piece a rather flat effect, and is an example of Simone Martini's influence. The drapery of the Virgin however, is an example of Lorenzetti's influence. Simple folds and lines along with the Madonna's stiff upright pose are nothing like the Madonnas of Martini but resemble the "statelier figures of Lorenzetti". The facial expression is completely of Vanni's own. The Madonna has a large round head, narrow eyes, a delicate mouth, and a firm chin. The Christ Child is said to be modeled after the prototype for Martini's fresco of the Majestas in the Palazzo della Signoria.

The figures of SS. James and Stephen on the left side panels are clear examples of Vanni's work. The head of S. Stephen is similar to that of the Virgin and show Vanni's love for the silhouette. The side figures of saints in the pinnacles of the polyptych show a strong sense of modeling.

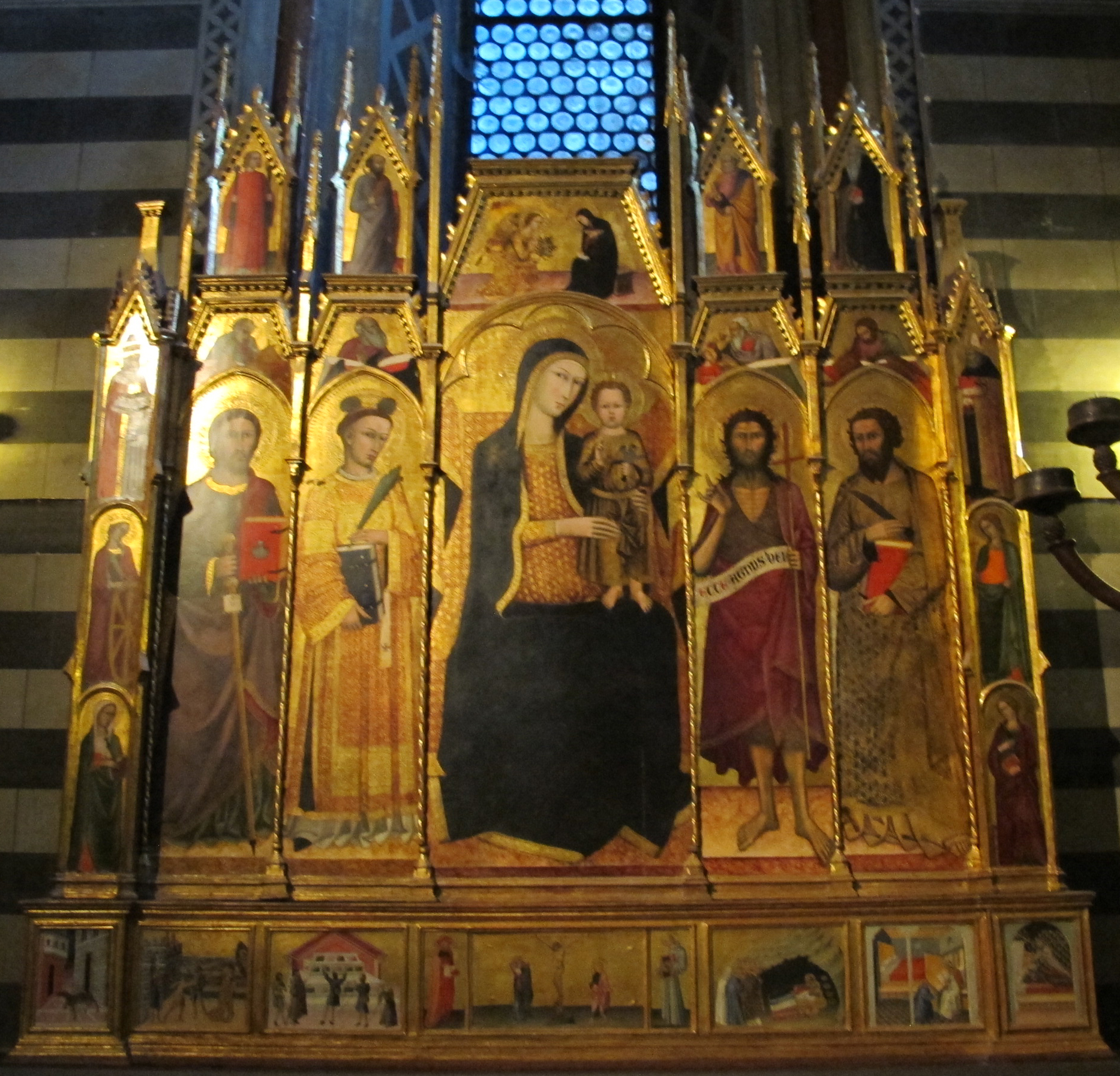
Polyptych of San Stefano

== Works attributed to Vanni ==
Another work may possibly be attributed to Vanni: a frescoed figure of St. John the Baptist on the left wall of a parish church in Basciano. Only fragments of the fresco survive and it is practically colorless which makes it hard to prove authorship. The case for Vanni being the artist includes figure parallels to the S. Francesco fresco and the kneeling St. John on the right-hand panel of the Corcoran triptych. This work would be from Vanni's late period and painted sometime after 1396 but prior to 1400. Some scholars suggest this fresco belongs to Andrea Gallerani.

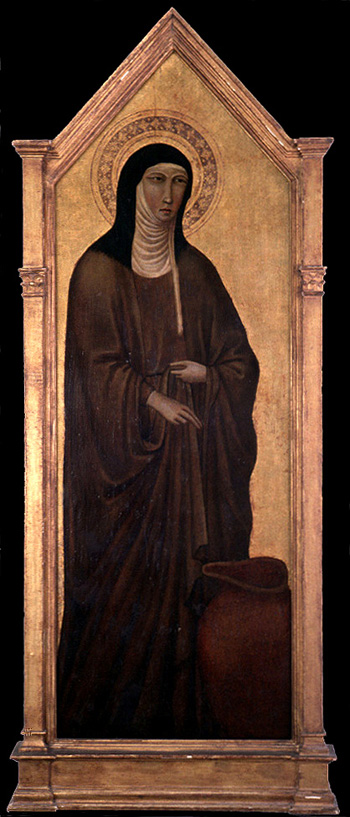
St. Catherine
