= Lorenzo Doveri =

Italian architect (1799–1866)

- Born: 10 August 1799; Pisa, Grand Duchy of Tuscany
- Died: 6 October 1866 (aged 67); Siena, Kingdom of Italy
- Occupation: Architect

Lorenzo Doveri (10 August 1799 – 6 October 1866) was an Italian architect active in Siena during the 19th century.

== Life and career ==
Doveri was born in Pisa in 1799, the son of the Sienese architect Alessandro Doveri and Reina Martini. Following in his father's footsteps, he pursued a career in architecture and teaching. In 1828 he was appointed professor of architecture at the Academy of Fine Arts of Siena, a position previously held by his father.

His teaching activity included courses in civil architecture, geometry, construction science, geodesy, and scenography, contributing to the formation of a generation of Sienese Purist architects, among them Giuseppe Partini.

In addition to teaching, Doveri was an active member of the Confraternity of the Misericordia of Siena. He designed several projects for the institution, including the enlargement of the oratory of Sant'Antonio Abate in 1836 and the first section of the new Misericordia cemetery, inaugurated in 1843. The cemetery, characterized by a Greek-Roman architectural style and underground sections decorated with Egyptian and Greek motifs, is considered his most significant architectural work.

From 1848 he also served as architect of the Opera del Duomo of Siena, overseeing restoration and maintenance work on the cathedral complex, including the redesign of the pavement, the decoration of stained glass windows, and restoration of the façade. These works were continued after his death by his pupil Partini. Among his other projects were the restoration of the towers of Monteriggioni and the design of the Villa della Posta along the Via Cassia.

Doveri died in Siena on 6 October 1866 and was buried in the monumental cemetery he had designed.

== Sources ==
- Bencivenni, Mario (1992). "DOVERI, Lorenzo". Dizionario Biografico degli Italiani. Vol. 41. Rome: Treccani.
- Cresti, Carlo; Zangheri, Luigi (1978). Architetti e ingegneri nella Toscana dell'Ottocento. Florence: Uniedit.
- Falorni, Marco (1982). Senesi da ricordare. Siena: Periccioli.
