= Alessandro Doveri =

Italian architect and engineer (1771–1845)

- Born: 1771; Siena, Grand Duchy of Tuscany
- Died: 10 November 1845 (aged 73–74); Siena, Grand Duchy of Tuscany
- Occupations: Architect, engineer

Alessandro Doveri (1771 – 10 November 1845) was an Italian architect and engineer of the Neoclassical-style, active mainly in his native Siena.

== Life and career ==
Doveri was initially sent to Pisa to study architecture. In 1810, he returned to Siena where he was employed as an engineer of roads and bridges. With the return of the Lorraine dynasty, he was employed between 1814 and 1817 in designing the new Teatro Rozzi in Piazza Indipendenza, Siena.

He continued to work as an architect for the government of Siena until 1836, and was involved in numerous reconstruction and engineering efforts. He also taught architecture, geometry, geodesy, and perspective at the Accademia di Belle Arti of Siena (1818–1828).

Doveri died in Siena. His son Lorenzo was also an architect.
