= Santo Stefano alla Lizza =

Church building in Siena, Italy

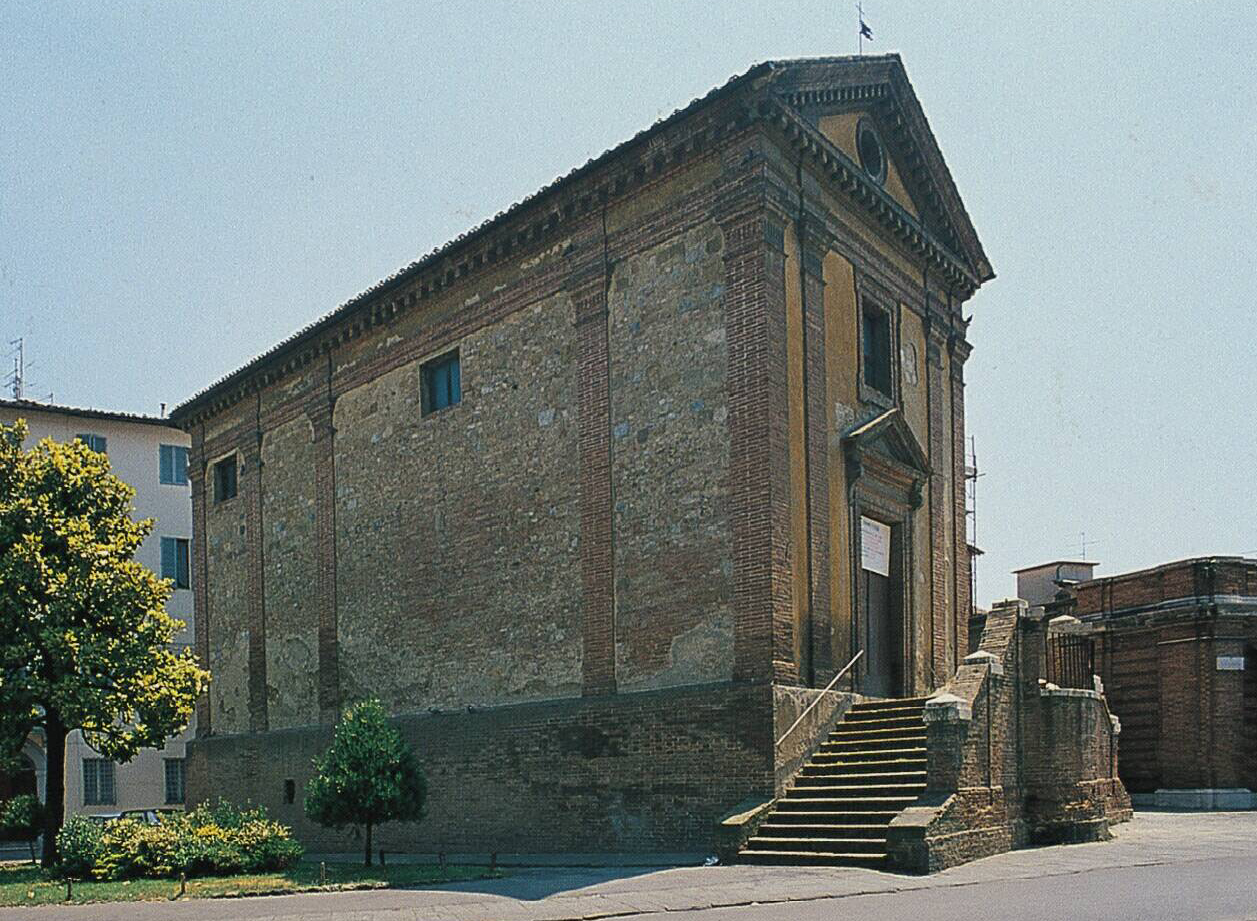

Religion
- Affiliation: Roman Catholic
- Region: Tuscany
- Ecclesiastical or organisational status: Archdiocese of Siena-Colle di Val d'Elsa-Montalcino

Location
- Location: Italy
- Municipality: Siena
- Interactive map of Santo Stefano alla Lizza
- Coordinates: 43.324344°N 11.327354°E

Architecture
- Style: Baroque
- Groundbreaking: 12th century
- Completed: 1671 – 1675, later reconstructions

Santo Stefano alla Lizza is a Baroque style, Roman Catholic church located on Via dei Gazzani, at the corner with La Lizza, in the city of Siena, region of Tuscany, Italy. It belongs to the Roman Catholic Archdiocese of Siena-Colle di Val d'Elsa-Montalcino.

== Overview ==
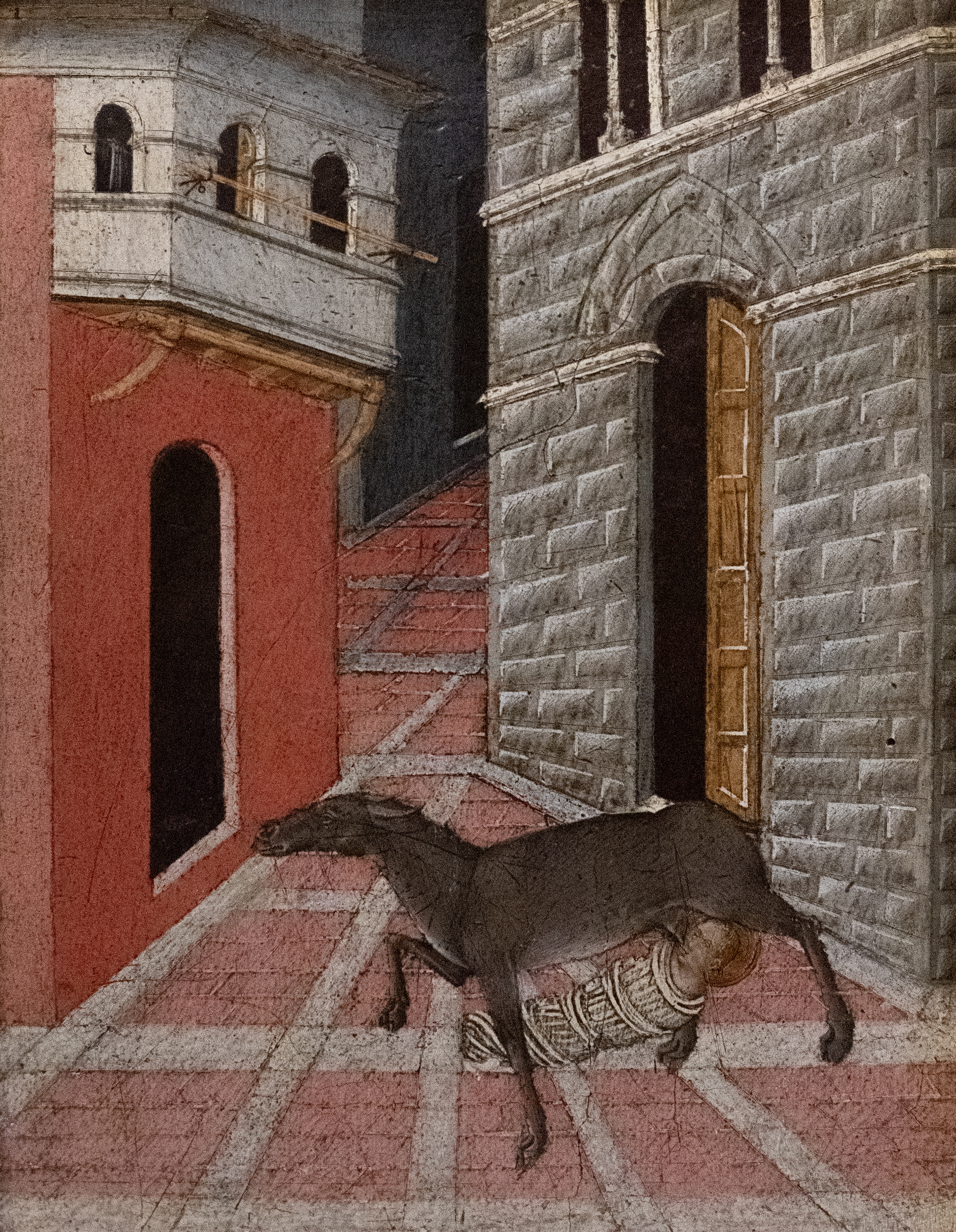
Predella by Giovanni di Paolo, St Stephen breast-fed by a doe

A Romanesque style building documented to exist since the 12th-century, was reconstructed in 1671–75. The façade is crowned with a tympanum with an oculus, and preceded by a flight of stairs in brick. The interior once housed a Madonna with child and Saints by Andrea Vanni and a complete predella by Giovanni di Paolo (six scenes from the Life of St Stephen with a central Crucifixion with Saints Jerome and Bernard), now in the Baptistery of Siena. On the right altar was a Visitation by Rutilio Manetti (also now kept in the Baptistery). The apse has a fragmentary Deposition by Antonio Buonfigli.

== Literature ==
- Toscana. Guida d'Italia (Red guide), Touring Club Italiano, Milan 2003. ISBN 88-365-2767-1
