= Archimede Vestri =

Archimede Vestri (1846–1904) was an Italian patriot and architect, born in Siena. Along with his father, Giovanni, and his sister, Baldovina Vestri, they were forced to flee Siena and their home, Palazzo Vestri, in 1849. Baldovina was a well-known friend and supporter of Giuseppe Garibaldi.

Archimede is best known for his design in 1887 of the Loggia at the Piazza Indipendenza, Siena. The area was designated in 1879 to accommodate a monument to the martyrs of the wars of Italian independence.
