= La Lizza =

Square and park in Siena, Italy

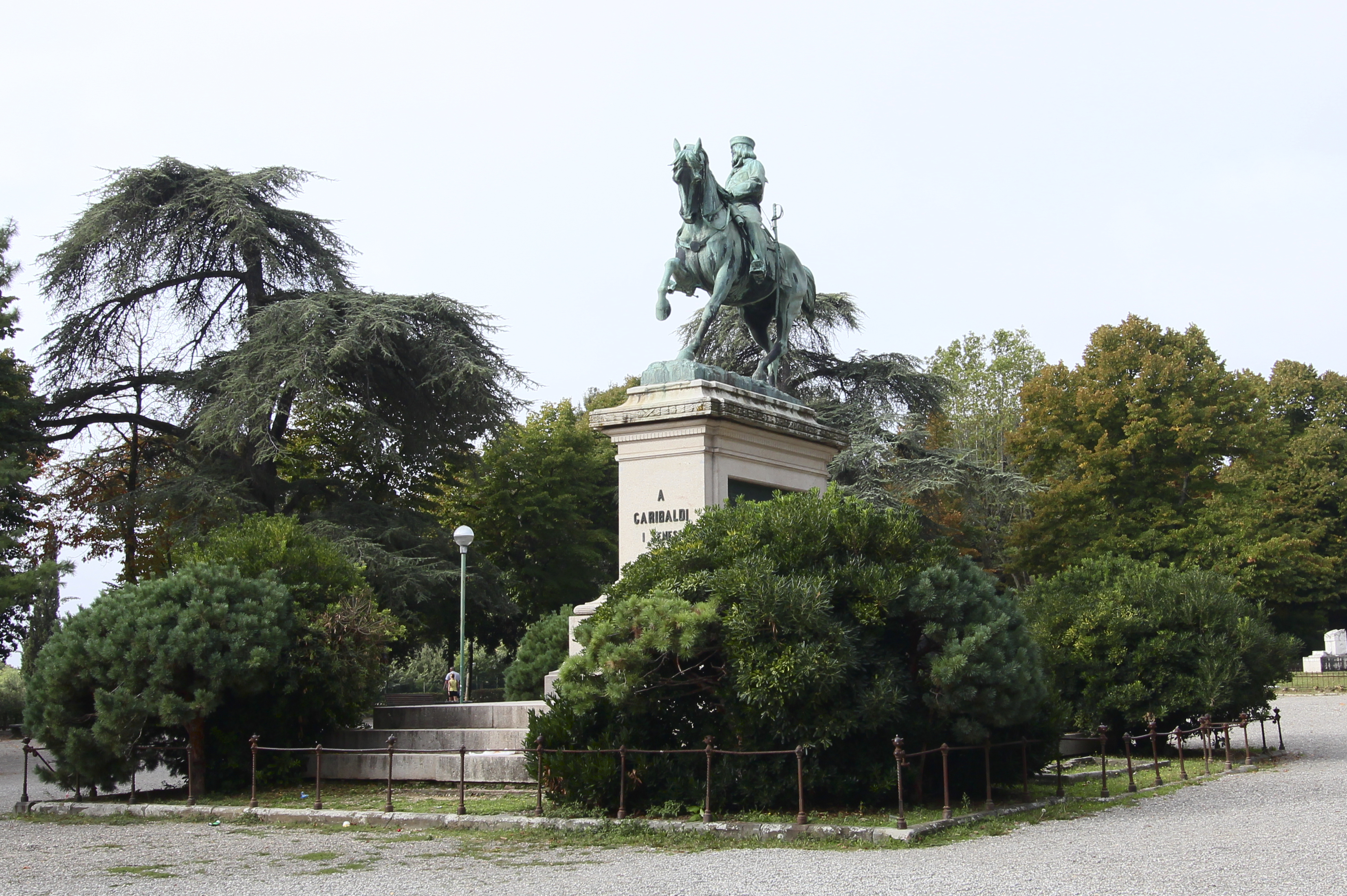
- The monument to Giuseppe Garibaldi

- Location within Tuscany
- Location: Siena, Tuscany, Italy
- Coordinates: 43°19′25″N 11°19′34″E

La Lizza is a square and public park in central Siena, Region of Tuscany, Italy. It is a very popular promenade spot for the Sienese population, as the main green space in the medieval city.

The wide area of La Lizza includes the gardens founded at the end of the 18th century, the section of the square adjacent to Piazza Gramsci, and the Medicean Fortress, located at the border with the San Prospero neighborhood. The gardens are bounded by the avenues of Viale Rinaldo Franci (to the north) and Viale Cesare Maccari (to the south).

== History ==
The area had previously hosted an equestrian school and knightly tournaments since the late 16th century, concurrent with the construction of the nearby Fortezza Medicea.

In 1779, based on a project by Antonio Matteucci, the area was transformed into a public park with improvements to the lawn and the widening of the road leading to the fortress, making it a gathering place for the local nobility and bourgeoisie. Between 1869 and 1872, under the design of Pietro Marchetti, the area was further expanded and enhanced: walkways were created, a fountain with a water clock was installed, along with a stage for performances and a café. In 1896, at the center of the park, the equestrian statue of Giuseppe Garibaldi was inaugurated, created by Raffaello Romanelli.

== Monuments and buildings ==
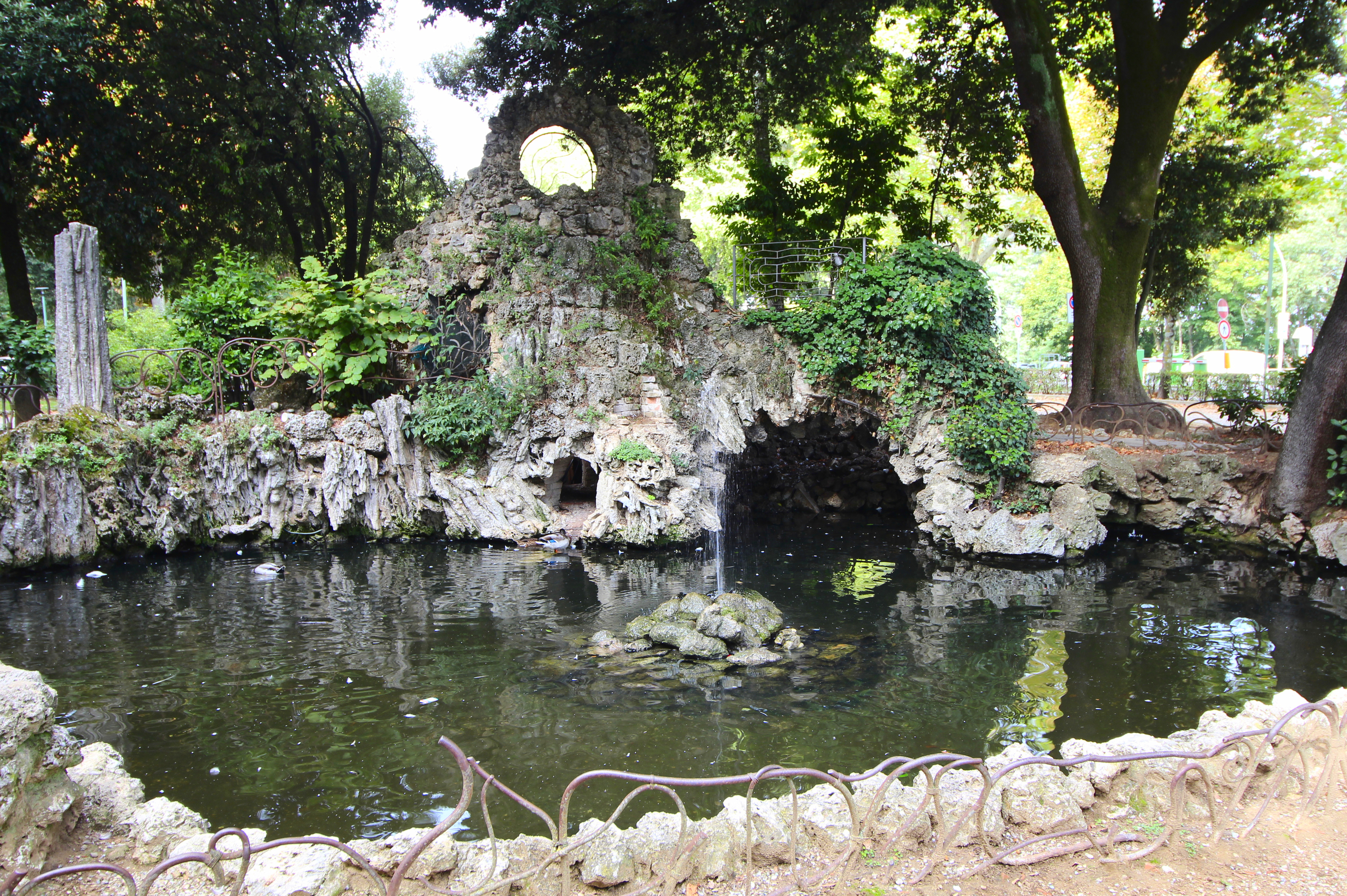
La Lizza fountain

In the gardens

- Monument to Giuseppe Garibaldi, by Raffaello Romanelli (1896)
- Monument to the horse, by Sandro Chia (1994)
- La Lizza fountain

On the square

- Palazzo Zuccantini-Zondadari, former Grand Hotel Royal (19th century)
- Palazzo Bernardi-Avanzati (1720)
- Santo Stefano alla Lizza, at the corner with Via dei Gazzani

On the promenades

- Asilo Monumento, by Vittorio Mariani (1924), on Viale Franci
- Casa del Mutilato (1930), on Viale Maccari
- Siena Courthouse, by Pierluigi Spadolini (1980), on Viale Franci
