= Teatro dei Rozzi, Siena =

Theatre in Siena, Tuscany, Italy

Coordinates: 43°19′08.7″N 11°19′49.2″E

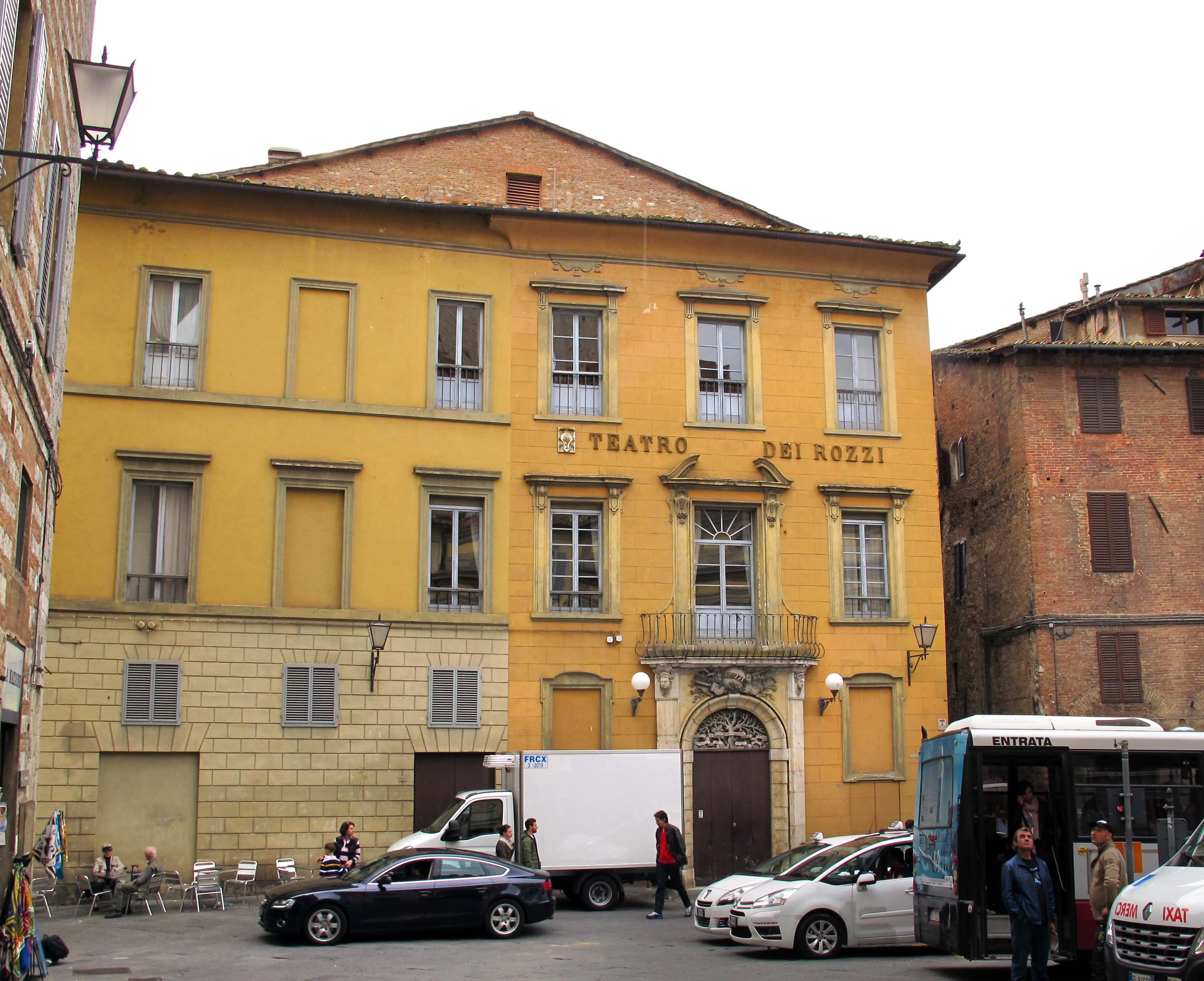
Teatro dei rozzi

The Teatro dei Rozzi is a live-performance theater located on Piazza Indipendenza #15, in the city of Siena, region of Tuscany, Italy; while this structure was inaugurated in 1817, the sponsoring organization dated to 1531.

== History ==
In 1531, a group of artisans created the Congregation of Rozzi dedicated to mainly oral performances of secular poetry, often during festivals. At this "academy", intellectuals and literati of the town attempted to refine the more popular forms of theater into more sophisticated art. By some it was called the Academy of the Uncouth for its avoidance of Latin texts. The group took on an emblem and symbol, the cork tree which draws from the ground. It is said among those attending performances were Pope Leo X and Holy Roman Emperor Charles V.

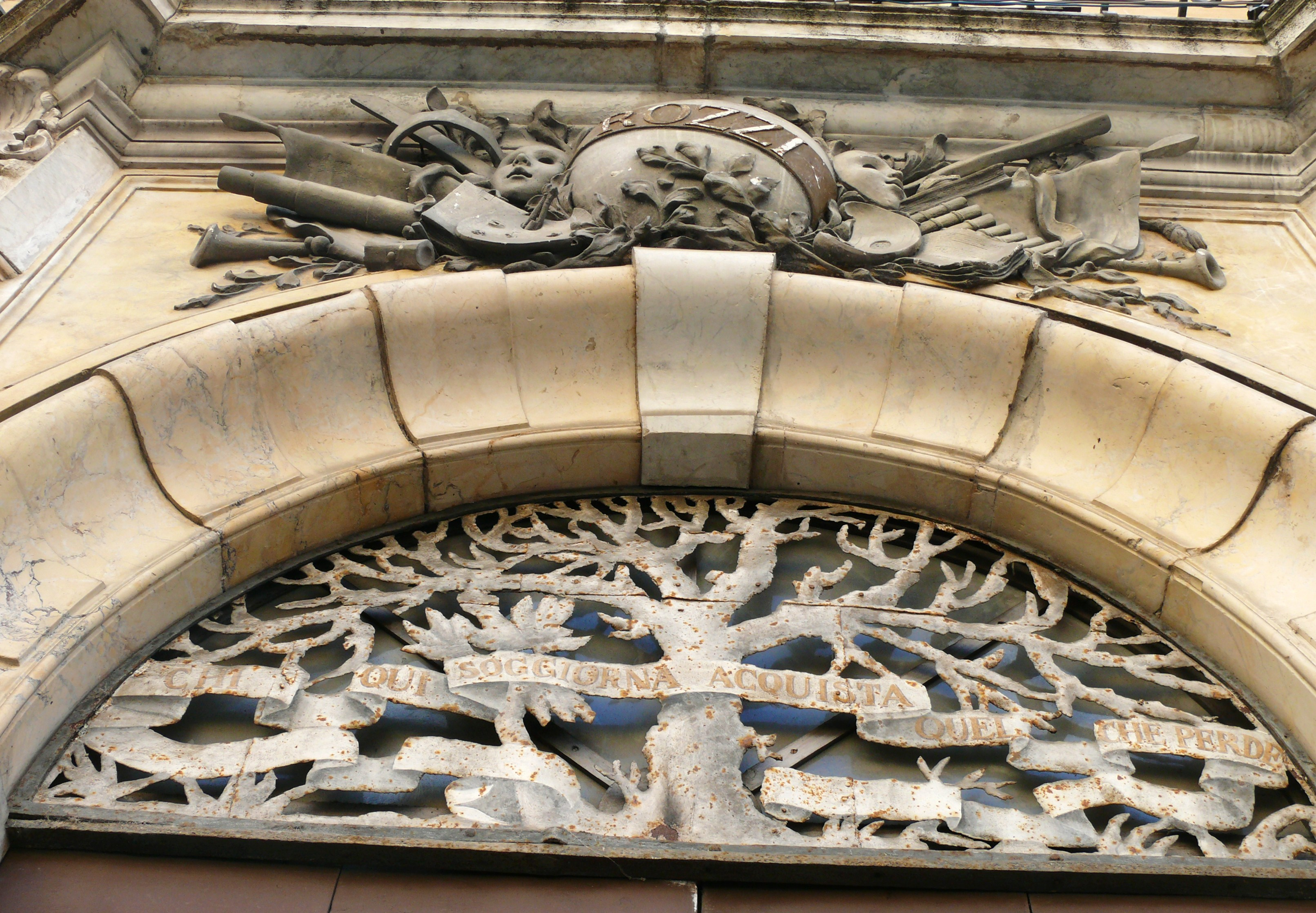
The gate of the theatre with Rozzi's coat of arms

During the middle decades of the 17th century, the Rozzi specialized in readings of pastoral drama, while later in the 17th century, it was occupied with the satirical comedies by Girolamo Gigli (1660-1722) and the comedies of character by Jacopo Angelo Nelli (1673-1767), and works of Pietro Fortini.

The congregation was transformed into the Academy of the Rozzi in 1690, to which Francesco de' Medici, granted use of rooms in the Palazzo Pubblico of Siena. During the 18th and 19th centuries it became a more prestigious cultural institution in town, fostering a number of dramatists, including Benvenuto Flori, Agostino Gallini, and Girolamo Ronconi.

The Accademia dei Rozzi established to build a theater in 1807, designed by Alessandro Doveri. The initial project was forsaken because it removed some of the meeting rooms of the Academy. A new locale, the present one, was obtained leading to construction of this theater in 1815 by the same architect using a different design. The Theater hall was inaugurated in 1817, with the musical play L'Agnese di Fitzenry by Ferdinando Paer.

In 1873, the architect Augusto Corbi remodeled the theater, which remained open until 1945, when damage from the Second World War caused it to close. It was later refurbished again and reopened to the public in 1998, as a theater with 499 seats, three rows of boxes and a gallery open houses and theatrical activities, music and conferences. The Accademia dei 'Rozzi' still maintains a library and archive of it past works and functions.

== In popular culture ==
Netflix series Can This Love Be Translated? which follows the romance between interpreter Joo Ho-jin and actress Cha Mu-hee, was filmed in the theater in early December 2024.
