= Andrea Gallerani =

Founder of Frati della Misericordia

Blessed Andrea Gallerani
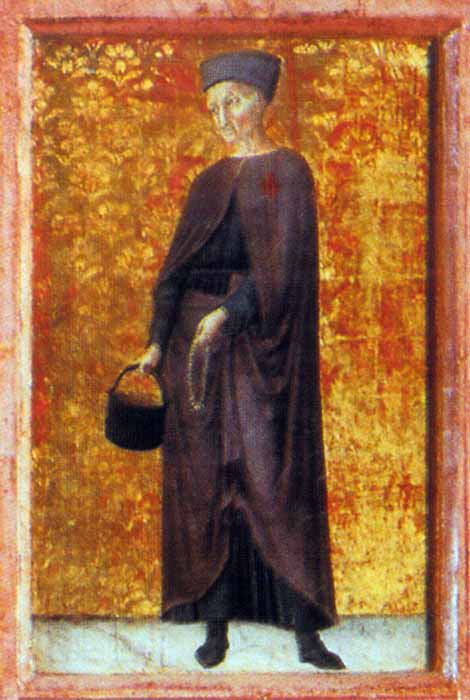
- Image c. 1445.
- Born: Siena, Republic of Siena
- Died: 19 March 1251; Siena, Republic of Siena
- Venerated in: Roman Catholic Church
- Beatified: 13 May 1798, Florence, Grand Duchy of Tuscany by Pope Pius VI
- Feast: 19 March, 20 June (in Siena)

Andrea Gallerani († 19 March 1251) was an Italian Roman Catholic from Siena and the founder of the now-defunct Frati della Misericordia association. Gallerani was a distinguished soldier until he killed a man he considered a blasphemer in a fit of rage. As a result, he was exiled and decided to live a life of penance for his sin.

== Life ==
Andrea Gallerani was born in Siena to the nobleman Ghezzolino Gallerani and served as a distinguished soldier. He was exiled and discredited for killing, with his sword in a fit of rage, a man he considered was a blasphemer. In his exile he experienced a radical shift in tone that compelled him to lead a penitential life for others. Gallerani soon returned to Siena, after receiving permission to do so, and in 1240 founded both a hospital and the religious association "Frati della Misericordia" - this association later died out in 1308 and was thus suppressed.

Gallerani died on 19 March 1251 in Siena and his remains were interred in the Basilica di San Domenico in Siena. The Republic of Siena approved his association three months after Gallerani's death on 23 June 1251. In 1274 the bishop granted indulgences to those that visited his tomb and Pope Pius V later reinforced this to a specific date in the week following Easter. On 13 May 1798 after his exile from Rome, and while stopping in Florence, Pope Pius VI approved the beatification of Gallerani.
