= Antonio Buonfigli =

Italian painter

Antonio or Antonio d'Ariodante Buonfigli (1680 - circa 1750) was an Italian painter of the late-Baroque period.

== Biography ==
He was born and active in Siena then part of the Grand Duchy of Tuscany. Leonardo Massimiliano de Vegni, an engraver, was one of his pupils. Buonfigli painted a Baptism of St Trofimo found in the Pinacoteca Nazionale di Siena.

An inventory of works in Siena from 1840, listed the following works:

- Paintings, Sacristy of the Oratorio del Rosario.
- Paintings, Educatorio di Santa Maria Maddalena
- Crucifix, Badia Nuova
- Dead Jesus altarpiece, Parish church of Santo Stefano alla Lizza
- Painting, Oratorio degli Artisti, Church of San Vigilio
- Santa Cecilia, Sacristy of Siena Cathedral
- Painting, Pieve di San Giovanni

An Antonio Buonfigli (1794 - 1874) from Lucca was known as a singer and musician.
