= Cemetery of Misericordia (Siena) =

Cemetery in Siena, Italy

- Cimitero della Misericordia
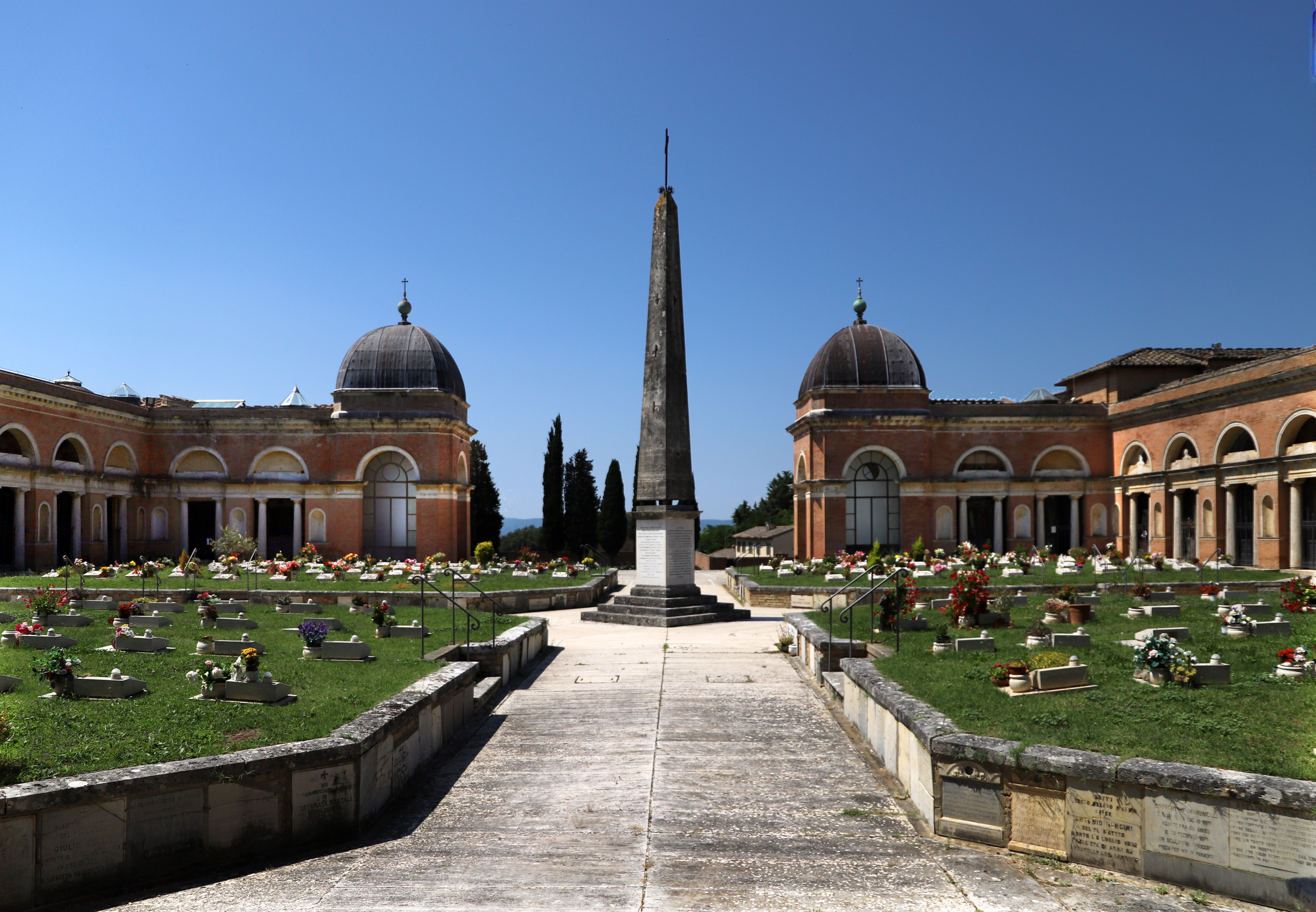
- Interactive map of Cemetery of Misericordia

Details
- Established: 1843
- Location: Siena, Tuscany
- Country: Italy
- Coordinates: 43.3089°N 11.3331°E

The cemetery of Misericordia (Cimitero della Misericordia) is a monumental cemetery in Siena, Tuscany, Italy, named after the local archconfraternity of the Misericordia.

It was designed by architect Lorenzo Doveri on the site of a former Olivetan convent outside Porta Tufi and inaugurated in 1843. After Doveri's death, works remained incomplete and in 1866 were entrusted to his pupil Giuseppe Partini, who expanded the cemetery, completing it in 1875. It has always been a Catholic cemetery, historically chosen by Siena's higher social classes, unlike the municipal Laterino cemetery. Post-war expansions added new burial sections, though some modern structures disrupt the 19th-century architectural harmony.

The cemetery preserves a rich collection of artistic works, including frescoes by Pietro Aldi, Cesare Maccari, Amos Cassioli, and Alessandro Franchi; and sculptures by Tito Sarrocchi, Ezio Trapassi, Patrizio Fracassi, Vico Consorti, Fulvio Corsini, and Giovanni Dupré.

== Sources ==
- Toscana. Guida d'Italia. Milan: Touring Club Italiano. 2003. p. 536.
- Ascheri, Mario; Turrini, Patrizia, eds. (2004). La Misericordia di Siena attraverso i secoli: dalla Domus Misericordiae all'Arciconfraternita di Misericordia. Siena: Protagon.
- Civai, Mauro; Toti, Enrico (1992). Siena: il sogno gotico. Nuova guida alla città. Siena: Alsaba. p. 113.
