= San Prospero, Siena =

San Prospero
- Neighbourhood
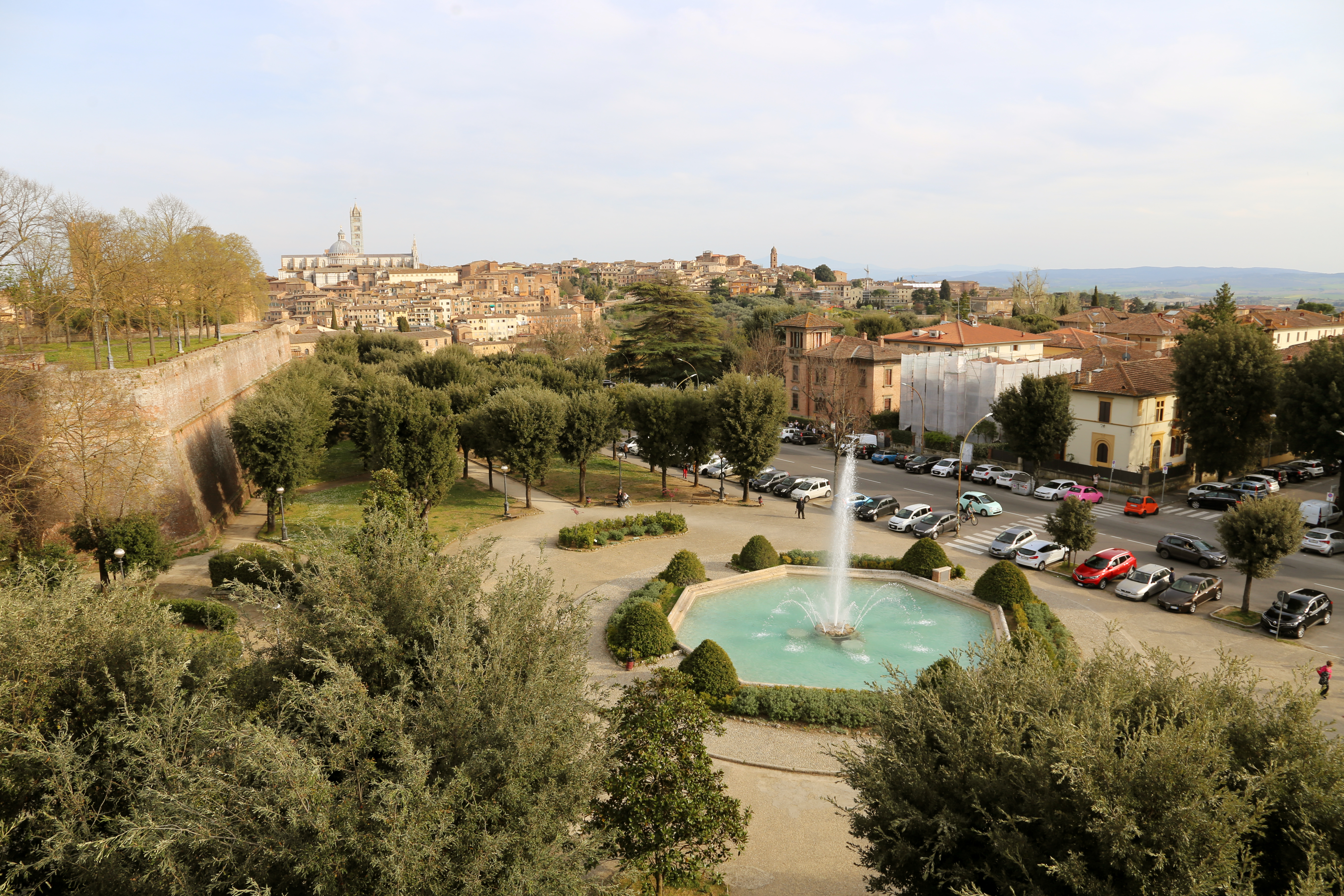
- Interactive map of San Prospero
- Coordinates: 43°19′11.7″N 11°19′12.7″E
- Country: Italy
- Region: Tuscany
- Province: Siena
- Comune: Siena
- Time zone: UTC+1 (CET)
  - Summer (DST): UTC+2 (CEST)

San Prospero is a neighborhood in the city of Siena, Tuscany. It represents the first of the so-called "first-generation suburbs" developed outside the city walls. Built between 1920 and 1931, it marked the beginning of Siena's modern urban expansion. Designed as a petit-bourgeois residential district, San Prospero combined popular housing with larger blocks of Art Nouveau-style villas.

== History ==
The neighborhood takes its name from the San Prospero hill and an ancient city gate once located near the former church of San Prospero, documented as early as 1093. In the late 13th century, a convent for the Montecellese nuns was established in the area but was later destroyed in the 16th century. Historically, the hamlet of San Prospero formed part of the rural administrative system known as the Masse within the Terzo di Camollia district. In 1640, it had 56 inhabitants. With the Leopoldine reforms of 1777, the Terzo di Camollia was dissolved, and San Prospero was incorporated into the Terzo di Città.

Following the abolition of the Masse in 1904, Siena began planning urban expansions beyond its medieval walls. The first major project was the San Prospero neighborhood, initiated on 16 May 1920. The new district addressed both the housing needs of families displaced from the Salicotto area (undergoing urban renewal) and the desire to create a modern, bourgeois residential zone.

Most buildings were developed by the Istituto per le Case Popolari with financial support from the Monte dei Paschi di Siena, and designed by engineer Armando Sabatini. Between 1921 and 1924, parts of the city wall were demolished to connect San Prospero with the central area near La Lizza. In April 1923, the Parco della Rimembranza (Remembrance Park) was inaugurated to honor World War I casualties. Later that year, the neighborhood was described by Fabio Bargagli Petrucci as a "garden village" inspired by the Anglo-Saxon Arts and Crafts tradition.

San Prospero became the subject of territorial disputes between the Contrade of Istrice and Oca, each seeing it as a natural extension of their own territory. A 1929 proposal to establish it as an independent Contrada was rejected, citing a 1719 law prohibiting the creation of new Contrade.

== Main sights ==
San Prospero is home to a number of architecturally and historically significant buildings and public spaces that reflect the stylistic diversity and urban development of Siena in the early 20th century.

=== Buildings and villas ===
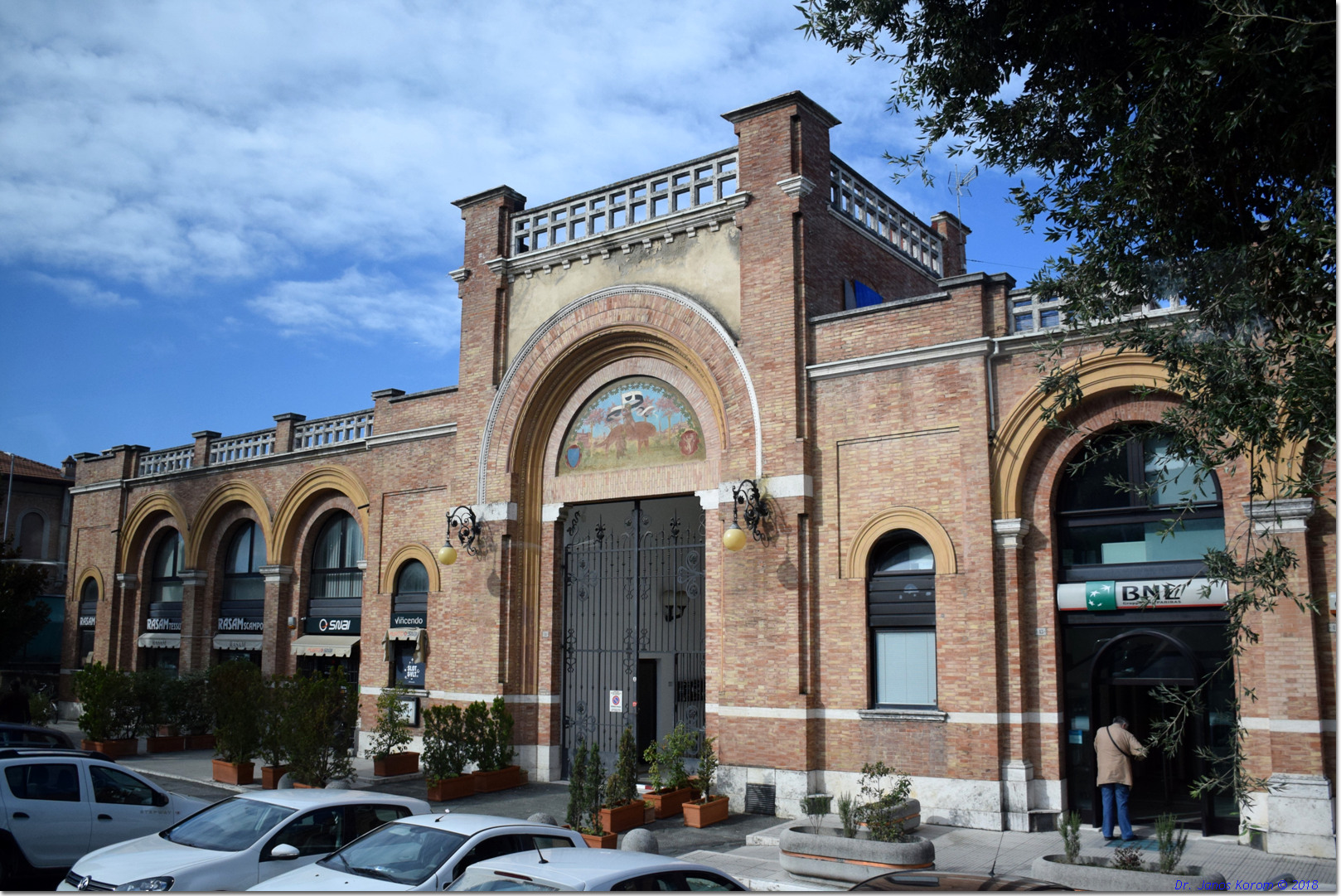
Former Fiat garage

Among the key examples is the former Fiat garage, a two-story structure with a taller central body designed in 1923 in an eclectic style by Bettino Marchetti for use as a garage and workshop. In Viale Trieste stands a prominent corner building in Liberty style, notable for its three levels and a façade featuring decorative brick panels alternated with vertical stone bands, as well as floral motifs around its openings.

One of the earliest villas in the district is the Villino Anitrini, located on Via Pannilunghi and designed by architect Vittorio Mariani in 1925. In Piazza IV Novembre, two Liberty-style villas stand out: the Park Lane Villa, designed by Armando Sabatini in 1926 for the city's building commission, and another villa at number 3, built between 1925 and 1931 by Sabatini for the housing cooperatives of Monte dei Paschi employees and war veterans. Also by Sabatini is a villa at 25 Viale Trieste, a two-story building with a brick structural system, completed in 1926. Another striking residence is the Villino Racanelli, a three-story Liberty-style house designed by Egisto Bellini in Viale Vittorio Veneto, while at number 9 on Via Pannilunghi stands an elegant and richly decorated villa, notable for its ornate floral motifs.

=== Monuments and memorials ===
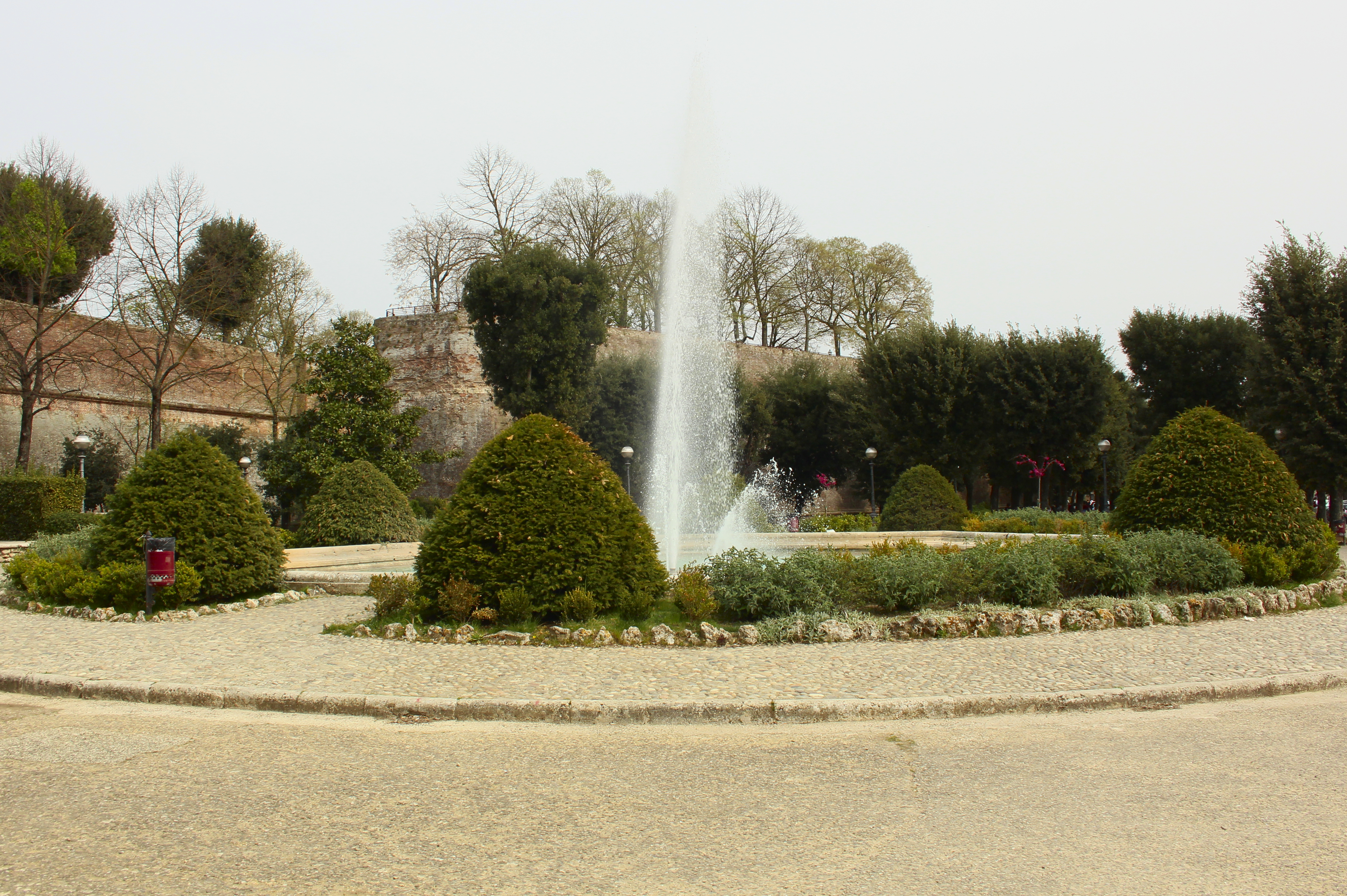
The fountain in San Prospero

The Independence War Memorial, originally inaugurated in 1879 in Piazza dell'Indipendenza and created by sculptor Tito Sarrocchi, was relocated to San Prospero in 1958 due to traffic concerns in its original location. The sculpture depicts a personification of Italy laying a laurel wreath—inscribed "To the brave Sienese who fell for me"—on a wounded lion, commemorating those who died during the Risorgimento.

Nearby, along Via Vittorio Veneto, lies the Park of Remembrance (Parco della Rimembranza), created in honor of Siena's World War I casualties. Inaugurated on 22 April 1923, as part of a nationwide initiative led by undersecretary Dario Lupi, the park features a tree for each fallen soldier and a central Liberty-style fountain comprising a large circular basin with a raised central water jet surrounded by smaller, evenly spaced jets.

== Sources ==
- Balestracci, Duccio (2019). Il Palio di Siena. Una festa italiana. Rome-Bari: Laterza.
- Ceppari Ridolfi, Maria Assunta; Turrini, Patrizia (1997). Siena e l'acqua. Storia e immagini di una città e delle sue fonti. NIE.
- Maccianti, Gabriele (2006). La lenta corsa del tempo. Siena di fronte alla modernità tra XIX e XX secolo. Il Leccio.
- Maggi, Stefano (2021). "Siena: periferia e qualità della vita nel Novecento" (PDF). In Andrea Maria Locatelli; Claudio Besana; Nicola Martinelli (eds.). Periferie europee. Istituzioni sociali, politiche, luoghi: una prospettiva storica. Vol. 1. Milan: Franco Angeli.
- Quattrocchi, Luca (2010). Architettura nelle terre di Siena. La prima metà del Novecento. Cinisello Balsamo: Silvana.
- Repetti, Emanuele (1840). "San Prospero". Dizionario geografico fisico storico della Toscana. Vol. 4. Florence. p. 676.
